= List of chief justices of the Supreme Court of Bombay =

This is a list of chief justices of the Supreme Court of Bombay in British India. The office was in existence from 1824 to 1862, when the Bombay High Court was founded. The role of the judges of the court was to defend, on behalf of the British Crown, the interests of the people of Bombay against the East India Company.

The Supreme Court was preceded by the Recorder's Court, established in 1798.

== List ==
#	Picture	Chief Justice	Took office	
1		Sir William Syer	1798	Died 1802
2		Sir James Mackintosh	1803	
3		Sir John Henry Newbolt	1811	
4		Sir Alexander Anstruther	1812	Died 1819
5		Sir D. Evans	1820	Died 1821
6		Sir Edward West	1822	Became Chief Justice of Supreme Court, 1823
6		Sir Edward West	1823	first year was in the Recorder's Court
7		Sir James Dewar	1829	
8		Sir Herbert Abingdon Draper Compton	1831	
9		Sir John Wither Awdry	1839	
10		Sir Henry Roper	1840	
11		Sir David Pollock	1846	
12		Sir Thomas Erskine Perry	1847	
13		Sir William Yardley	1852	
14		Sir Matthew Richard Sausse	1859	became Bombay High Court Chief Judge in 1862
14		Sir Mathew Richard Sausse	1862	1866
15		Sir Richard Couch	1866	1870
16		Sir Michael Roberts Westropp	1870	1882
17		Sir Charles Sargent	1882	1895
18		Sir Charles Frederick Farran	1895	1898
19		Sir Louis Addin Kershaw	1898	1899
20		Sir Lawrence Hugh Jenkins	1899	1908
21		Sir Basil Scott	1908	1919
22		Sir Norman Cranstoun Macleod	1919	1926
23		Sir Amberson Barrington Marten	1926	1930
24		Sir John William Fisher Beaumont	1930	1943
25		Sir Leonard Stone	1943	1947
After Independence
26		Sir Leonard Stone	1947	1948
27		Mahommedali Currim Chagla	1948	1958
28		Hashmatrai Khubchand Chainani	1958	1965
29		Yeshwant Shripad Tambe	1965	4 February 1966
29		Yeshwant Shripad Tambe	5 February 1966	31 July 1966
30		Sohrab Peshotan Kotval	1 August 1966	26 September 1972
31		K. Kalyandas Desai	27 September 1972	26 October 1972
32		Ramanlal Maneklal Kantawala	27 October 1972	5 October 1978
33		B. N. Deshmukh	6 October 1978	18 November 1980
34		Venkat Shrinivas Deshpande	19 November 1980	11 January 1981
34		Venkat Shrinivas Deshpande	12 January 1981	11 August 1982
35		Dinshah Pirosha Madon	12 August 1982	30 August 1982
35		Dinshah Pirosha Madon	31 August 1982	14 March 1983
36		Madhukar Narhar Chandurkar	15 March 1983	14 March 1984
37		Konda Madhava Reddy	8 April 1984	21 October 1985
38		Madhukar Hiralal Kania	23 June 1986	1 May 1987
39		Chittatosh Mookerjee	2 November 1987	31 December 1990
40		Prabodh Dinkarrao Desai	7 January 1991	13 December 1992
41		Manoj Kumar Mukherjee	9 January 1993	14 December 1993
42		Sujata Manohar	15 January 1994	7 November 1994
43		Anandamoy Bhattacharjee	21 April 1994	1 April 1995
44		Manharlal Bhikhalal Shah	2 August 1995	9 December 1998
45		Yogesh Kumar Sabharwal	3 February 1999	28 January 2000
46		Bisheshwar Prasad Singh	31 March 2000	14 December 2001
47		Chunilal Karsandas Thakker	31 December 2001	7 June 2004
48		Dalveer Bhandari	25 July 2004	27 October 2005
49		Kshitij R. Vyas	25 February 2006	18 July 2006
50		Harjit Singh Bedi	3 October 2006	12 January 2007
51		Swatanter Kumar	31 March 2007	30 December 2009
52		Anil Ramesh Dave	11 February 2010	29 April 2010
53		Mohit Shantilal Shah	26 June 2010	8 September 2015
54		Dhirendra Hiralal Waghela	15 February 2016	10 August 2016
55		Manjula Chellur	22 August 2016	4 December 2017
56		Vijaya Tahilramani	5 December 2017	12 August 2018
57		Naresh Harishchandra Patil	13 August 2018	28 October 2018
57		Naresh Harishchandra Patil	29 October 2018	6 April 2019
58		Pradeep Nandrajog	7 April 2019	23 February 2020
59		B. P. Dharmadhikari	24 February 2020	19 March 2020
59		B. P. Dharmadhikari	20 March 2020	27 April 2020
60		Dipankar Datta	28 April 2020	11 December 2022
61		Ramesh Devkinandan Dhanuka	28 May 2023	30 May 2023
62		Nitin Jamdar	30 May 2023	28 July 2023
63		Devendra Kumar Upadhyaya	29 July 2023	20 January 2025
64		Alok Aradhe	21 January 2025	Present

== See also ==
- List of chief justices of the Bombay High Court
