= List of chief justices of the Bombay High Court =

Chief Justice of Bombay High Court
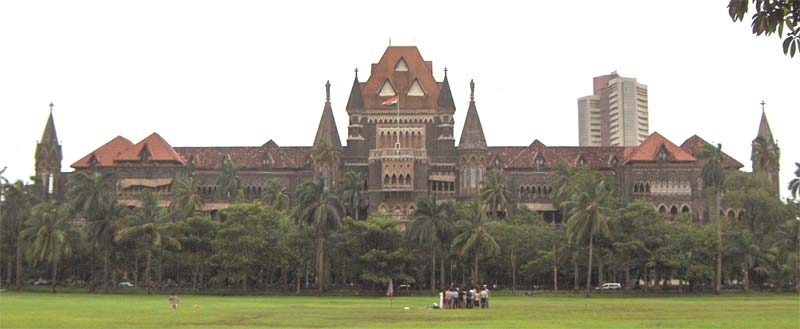
- Incumbent; Mahesh Chandra Tripathi since 9 September 2026
- Bombay High Court
- Abbreviation: CJ Bombay
- Seat: Bombay
- Nominator: Collegium of the Supreme Court of India
- Appointer: President of India
- Term length: till the age of 62 yrs
- Constituting instrument: Constitution of India (under Article 124)
- Formation: 1862; 164 years ago
- First holder: Justice Matthew Richard Sausse (1862-1866)
- Salary: ₹250,000 (US$2,700) (per month)
- Website: http://www.bombayhighcourt.nic.in/

This is a list of chief justices of the Bombay High Court, in India. See List of chief justices of the Supreme Court of Bombay for previous chief justices.

Colour Key

- Served as Chief Justice of India
- Female Chief Justice
- Elevated to Supreme Court of India
- Female chief justice elevated to Supreme Court of India

Symbol Key

- ^{‡} Resigned
- ^{†} Died in office

Chief Justices elevated to Supreme Court of India includes those who were elevated to supreme court at any point of their career.

Chief Justices mentioned in italics were those who were serving as Acting Chief Justice in the same high court immediately before their permanent appointment.

Date of initial appointment - Date of first appointment as High court judge

CJ - Chief Justice

== List ==
The Bombay High Court was established on 14 August 1862 under the Indian High Courts Act 1861 and has had 49 permanent Chief Justices and several Acting Chief Justices. Website of Maharashtra Judicial Academy contains list of its former patron in chiefs who always had been the chief justice of Bombay High Court (whether acting or permanent). Thus the list contained in this website would serve as primary reference for acting chief justices after 2009.

#	Name	Portrait	Date of Appointment	Date of Retirement	Tenure	Parent High Court	Date of initial Appointment	Notes & References
1	Matthew Richard Sausse		14 August 1862	27 April 1866	3 years, 257 days	Bar	--	
2	Richard Couch		28 April 1866	31 March 1870	3 years, 338 days	Bombay	14 August 1862	(Note: Transferred to Calcutta High Court)
3	Michael Roberts Westropp		1 April 1870	8 August 1882	12 years, 130 days	Bombay	1863	
4	Charles Sargent		9 August 1882	19 June 1895	12 years, 315 days	Bombay	3 March 1866	
5	Charles Frederick Farran		20 June 1895	9 September 1898^{[†]}	3 years, 82 days	Bombay	1890	
6	Louis Addin Kershaw		12 November 1898	17 February 1899^{[†]}	98 days	Bar	--	(Note: CJ of Allahabad High Court transferred as CJ of Bombay)
7	Lawrence Hugh Jenkins		20 April 1899	14 March 1909	9 years, 329 days	Calcutta	24 April 1896	
8	Basil Scott		22 April 1908	31 May 1919	11 years, 40 days	Bar	--	
9	Norman Cranstoun Macleod		1 June 1919	6 June 1926	7 years, 6 days	Bombay	1910	
10	Amberson Barrington Marten		7 June 1926	17 June 1930^{[‡]}	4 years, 11 days	Bombay	1916	
11	John William Fisher Beaumont		20 June 1930	29 September 1943	13 years, 102 days	Bar	--	
12	Leonard Stone		30 September 1943	3 January 1948^{[‡]}	4 years, 96 days	Bar	--	
13	Mahommedali Currim Chagla		6 February 1948	26 October 1958^{[‡]}	10 years, 257 days	Bombay	4 August 1941	(Note: He became ACJ on 3 January 1948 and served till 5 February 1948 for 34 days before becoming permanent Chief Justice)
14	Hashmatrai Khubchand Chainani		27 October 1958	28 November 1965^{[†]}	7 years, 33 days	Bombay	28 August 1948	
15	Yeshwant Shripad Tambe		7 February 1966	31 July 1966	175 days	Nagpur (Note: Nagpur High court ceased to exist on 1 November 1956 when it was converted into newly established Madhya Pradesh High Court and some of its judges became judges of Madhya Pradesh High court while some of its judges were transferred to Bombay High Court)	8 February 1954	(Note: He became ACJ on 28 November 1965 and served till 6 February 1966 for 71 days before becoming permanent Chief Justice)
16	Sohrab Peshotan Kotval		1 August 1966	27 September 1972	6 years, 58 days	Nagpur	18 August 1955	
17	Kapil Kalyandas Desai		28 September 1972	27 October 1972	30 days	Bombay	18 August 1958	
18	Ramanlal Maneklal Kantawala		28 October 1972	5 October 1978	5 years, 343 days	Bombay	9 February 1962	
19	Balkrishna Narhar Deshmukh		6 October 1978	18 November 1980	2 years, 44 days	Bombay	7 June 1965	
20	Venkat Shrinivas Deshpande		12 January 1981	10 August 1982	1 year, 211 days	Bombay	11 June 1967	(Note: He became ACJ on 19 November 1980 and served till 11 January 1981 for 54 days before becoming permanent Chief Justice)
21	Dinshah Pirosha Madon		31 August 1982	14 March 1983	196 days	Bombay	25 September 1967	(Note: He became ACJ on 11 August 1982 and served till 30 August 1982 for 20 days before becoming permanent Chief Justice and later elevated to Supreme Court of India)
22 Expand	Madhukar Narhar Chandurkar		2 January 1984	2 April 1984	92 days	Bombay	28 October 1967	(Note: He became ACJ on 15 March 1983 and served till 1 January 1984 for 293 days before becoming permanent Chief Justice and later transferred as CJ to Madras High Court)
--	M. H. Kania		2 April 1984	7 April 1984	6 days	Bombay	4 November 1969	
23	Konda Madhava Reddy		8 April 1984	21 October 1985	1 year, 197 days	Andhra Pradesh	28 May 1968	(Note: CJ of Undivided Andhra Pradesh High Court transferred as CJ of Bombay)
24 Expand	Madhukar Hiralal Kania		23 June 1986	30 April 1987	312 days	Bombay	4 November 1969	(Note: He became ACJ on 22 October 1985 and served till 22 June 1986 for 241 days before becoming permanent Chief Justice and later elevated to Supreme Court of India)
--	Sharadchandra Krishnaprasd Desai		1 May 1987	2 September 1987	125 days	Bombay	15 April 1970	(Note: Appointed as Acting Governor of Maharashtra on 3 September 1987)
--	C. S. Dharmadhikari		3 September 1987	1 November 1987	60 days	Bombay	13 July 1972	
25 Expand	Chittatosh Mookerjee		2 November 1987	1 January 1991	3 years, 61 days	Calcutta	2 April 1969	(Note: CJ of Calcutta High Court transferred as CJ of Bombay)
--	Subhash Chhaganlal Pratap		1 January 1991	6 January 1991	6 days	Bombay	19 September 1977	
26 Expand	Prabodh Dinkarrao Desai		7 January 1991	14 December 1992	1 year, 343 days	Gujarat	19 February 1970	
--	Sujata Manohar		15 December 1992	8 January 1993	25 days	Bombay	23 January 1978	
27	Manoj Kumar Mukherjee		9 January 1993	14 December 1993	340 days	Calcutta	17 June 1977	
28	Sujata Manohar		15 January 1994	20 April 1994	96 days	Bombay	23 January 1978	(Note: She became ACJ on 15 December 1993 and served till 14 January 1994 for 31 days before becoming permanent Chief Justice and later transferred as CJ to Kerala High Court)
29 Expand	Anandamoy Bhattacharjee		21 April 1994	1 April 1995^{[‡]}	346 days	Sikkim	16 June 1976	
--	Madhav Laxman Pendse		1 April 1995	27 July 1995	118 days	Bombay	25 January 1978	(Note: Elevated as Chief Justice of Karnataka High Court)
30 Expand	Manharlal Bhikhalal Shah		2 August 1995	8 December 1998	3 years, 129 days	Gujarat	28 January 1983	
--	A. C. Agarwal		9 December 1998	2 February 1999	56 days	Bombay	21 November 1986	
31 Expand	Yogesh Kumar Sabharwal		3 February 1999	28 January 2000	360 days	Delhi	17 November 1986	
--	Manohar Bansiji Ghodeswar		29 January 2000	13 February 2000	16 days	Bombay	15 November 1988	(Note: Retired as ACJ)
--	Bhagwati Prasad Saraf		14 February 2000	20 February 2000	7 days	Gauhati	2 January 1989	(Note: Elevated as Chief Justice of Jammu & Kashmir High Court)
--	Niranjan Janmashanker Pandya		21 February 2000	30 March 2000	39 days	Gujarat	21 June 1990	
32 Expand	Bisheshwar Prasad Singh		31 March 2000	13 December 2001	1 year, 258 days	Patna	9 March 1987	
--	Gulabrao Deorao Patil		14 December 2001	30 December 2001	17 days	Bombay	30 July 1990	
33 Expand	Chunilal Karsandas Thakker		31 December 2001	6 June 2004	2 years, 159 days	Gujarat	21 June 1990	(Note: CJ of Himachal Pradesh High Court transferred as CJ of Bombay)
--	A. P. Shah		7 June 2004	24 July 2004	48 days	Bombay	18 December 1992	
34 Expand	Dalveer Bhandari		25 July 2004	27 October 2005	1 year, 95 days	Delhi	19 March 1991	
--	Vishwanath Gopal Palshikar		28 October 2005	24 February 2006	120 days	Bombay	20 January 1994	
35 Expand	Kshitij Rameshbhai Vyas		25 February 2006	18 July 2006	144 days	Gujarat	22 November 1990	
--	Vishwanath Gopal Palshikar		19 July 2006	2 October 2006	120 days	Bombay	20 January 1994	
36 Expand	Harjit Singh Bedi		3 October 2006	11 January 2007	101 days	Punjab & Haryana	15 March 1991	
--	H. L. Gokhale		12 January 2007	6 March 2007	54 days	Bombay	20 January 1994	(Note: Elevated as Chief Justice of Allahabad High Court)
--	J. N. Patel		7 March 2007	30 March 2007	24 days	Bombay	11 March 1996	
37 Expand	Swatanter Kumar		31 March 2007	17 December 2009	2 years, 262 days	Delhi	10 November 1994	
--	J. N. Patel		18 December 2009	10 February 2010	55 days	Bombay	11 March 1996	
38 Expand	Anil Ramesh Dave		11 February 2010	29 April 2010	78 days	Gujarat	18 September 1995	
--	J. N. Patel		30 April 2010	25 June 2010	57 days	Bombay	11 March 1996	(Note: Elevated as Chief Justice of Calcutta High Court)
39 Expand	Mohit Shantilal Shah		26 June 2010	8 September 2015	5 years, 75 days	Gujarat	18 September 1995	
--	V. K. Tahilramani		9 September 2015	14 February 2016	159 days	Bombay	26 June 2001	
40 Expand	Dhirendra Hiralal Waghela		15 February 2016	10 August 2016	178 days	Gujarat	17 September 1999	(Note: CJ of Orissa High Court transferred as CJ of Bombay)
--	V. K. Tahilramani		11 August 2016	21 August 2016	11 days	Bombay	26 June 2001	
41 Expand	Manjula Chellur		22 August 2016	4 December 2017	1 year, 105 days	Karnataka	21 February 2000	
--	V. K. Tahilramani		5 December 2017	11 August 2018	250 days	Bombay	26 June 2001	(Note: Elevated as Chief Justice of Madras High Court)
42	Naresh Harishchandra Patil		29 October 2018	6 April 2019	160 days	Bombay	12 October 2001	(Note: He became ACJ on 12 August 2018 and served till 28 October 2018 for 78 days before becoming permanent Chief Justice)
43	Pradeep Nandrajog		7 April 2019	23 February 2020	323 days	Delhi	20 December 2002	(Note: CJ of Rajasthan High Court transferred as CJ of Bombay)
44	Bhushan Pradyumna Dharmadhikari		20 March 2020	27 April 2020	39 days	Bombay	15 March 2004	(Note: He became ACJ on 24 February 2020 and served till 19 March 2020 for 25 days before becoming permanent Chief Justice)
45 Expand	Dipankar Datta		28 April 2020	11 December 2022	2 years, 228 days	Calcutta	22 June 2006	
--	S. V. Gangapurwala		12 December 2022	27 May 2023	167 days	Bombay	13 March 2010	
46 Expand	Ramesh Deokinandan Dhanuka		28 May 2023	30 May 2023	3 days	Bombay	23 January 2012	
--	N. M. Jamdar		31 May 2023	28 July 2023	59 days	Bombay	23 January 2012	
47	Devendra Kumar Upadhyaya		29 July 2023	20 January 2025	1 year, 176 days	Allahabad	21 November 2011	(Note: Transferred to Delhi High Court)
48	Alok Aradhe		21 January 2025	28 August 2025	220 days	Madhya Pradesh	29 December 2009	(Note: CJ of Telangana High Court transferred as CJ of Bombay)
49 Expand	Shree Chandrashekhar		5 September 2025	1 June 2026	270 days	Jharkhand	17 January 2013	(Note: He became ACJ on 29 August 2025 and served till 4 September 2025 for 7 days before becoming permanent Chief Justice and later elevated to Supreme Court of India)
--	R. V. Ghuge		2 June 2026	8 September 2026	99 days	Bombay	21 June 2013	
