= 2027 in India =

- Centuries: 19th; 20th; 21st
- Decades: 2000s; 2010s; 2020s
- See also: List of years in India; Timeline of Indian history

The following is a list of events for the year 2027 in India.

== Incumbents ==
=== National office bearers ===
Position	Portrait	Name	Since
President of India		Droupadi Murmu (Age 68)	25 July 2022
Vice President of India/ Chairman of Rajya Sabha		C. P. Radhakrishnan (Age 69)	12 September 2025
Prime Minister of India		Narendra Modi (Age 76)	26 May 2014
Chief Justice of India		Surya Kant (Age 64)	24 November 2025
Speaker of the Lok Sabha		Om Birla (Age 63)	19 June 2019
Deputy Chairman of the Rajya Sabha		Harivansh Narayan Singh (Age 70)	9 August 2018
Chief Election Commissioner of India		Gyanesh Kumar (Age 62)	19 February 2025
Chief of Defence Staff		N. S. Raja Subramani (Age 61)	31 May 2026
Governor of Reserve Bank of India		Sanjay Malhotra (Age 58)	11 December 2024
Lok Sabha		18th Lok Sabha	24 June 2024

=== State governments ===
State	Governor	Chief Minister	Political Party	Political alliance	Chief Justice
Andhra Pradesh	S. Abdul Nazeer	N. Chandrababu Naidu	TDP	N.D.A.	Lisa Gill
Arunachal Pradesh	Kaiwalya Trivikram Parnaik	Pema Khandu	BJP	N.D.A.	Vijay Bishnoi
Assam	Lakshman Prasad Acharya	Himanta Biswa Sarma	BJP	N.D.A.	Vijay Bishnoi
Bihar	Syed Ata Hasnain	Samrat Choudhary	BJP	N.D.A.	K. Vinod Chandran
Chhattisgarh	Ramen Deka	Vishnu Deo Sai	BJP	N.D.A.	Ramesh Sinha
Goa	Ashok Gajapathi Raju	Pramod Sawant	BJP	N.D.A.	Devendra Kumar Upadhyaya
Gujarat	Acharya Dev Vrat	Bhupendrabhai Patel	BJP	N.D.A.	Sunita Agarwal
Haryana	Ashim Kumar Ghosh	Nayab Singh Saini	BJP	N.D.A.	Sheel Nagu
Himachal Pradesh	Kavinder Gupta	Sukhvinder Singh Sukhu	INC	I.N.D.I.A	Gurmeet Singh Sandhawalia
Jharkhand	Santosh Kumar Gangwar	Hemant Soren	JMM	I.N.D.I.A	M. S. Sonak
Karnataka	Thawar Chand Gehlot	D. K. Shivakumar	INC	I.N.D.I.A	Nilay Vipinchandra Anjaria
Keralam	Rajendra Arlekar	V. D. Satheesan	INC	I.N.D.I.A	Nitin Madhukar Jamdar
Madhya Pradesh	Mangubhai Patel	Mohan Yadav	BJP	N.D.A.	Suresh Kumar Kait
Maharashtra	Jishnu Dev Varma	Devendra Fadnavis	BJP	N.D.A.	Devendra Kumar Upadhyaya
Manipur	Ajay Kumar Bhalla	Yumnam Khemchand Singh	BJP	N.D.A.	Siddharth Mridul
Meghalaya	C. H. Vijayashankar	Conrad Sangma	NPP	N.D.A.	S. Vaidyanathan
Mizoram	V. K. Singh	Lalduhoma	ZPM	Regional	Vijay Bishnoi
Nagaland	Nand Kishore Yadav	Neiphiu Rio	NPF	N.D.A.	Vijay Bishnoi
Odisha	Kambhampati Hari Babu	Mohan Charan Majhi	BJP	N.D.A.	Harish Tandon
Punjab	Gulab Chand Kataria	Bhagwant Mann	AAP	Regional	Sheel Nagu
Rajasthan	Haribhau Kisanrau Bagde	Bhajan Lal Sharma	BJP	N.D.A.	Manindra Mohan Shrivastava
Sikkim	Om Prakash Mathur	Prem Singh Tamang	SKM	N.D.A.	Biswanath Somadder
Tamil Nadu	Rajendra Arlekar (additional charge)	Vijay	TVK	Regional	Sanjay V. Gangapurwala
Telangana	Shiv Pratap Shukla	Revanth Reddy	INC	I.N.D.I.A	Alok Aradhe
Tripura	N. Indrasena Reddy	Manik Saha	BJP	N.D.A.	M. S. Ramachandra Rao
Uttar Pradesh	Anandiben Patel	Yogi Adityanath	BJP	N.D.A.	Arun Bhansali
Uttarakhand	Gurmit Singh	Pushkar Singh Dhami	BJP	N.D.A.	Manoj Kumar Gupta
West Bengal	R. N. Ravi	Suvendu Adhikari	BJP	N.D.A.	Sujoy Paul

=== Union territory governments ===
State	Lieutenant governor and Administrators	Chief Minister	Party	Political alliance	Chief Justice
Andaman and Nicobar Islands	Devendra Kumar Joshi (Lieutenant governor)	✗	✗	✗	Sujoy Paul (Calcutta High Court)
Chandigarh	Gulab Chand Kataria (Administrators)	✗	✗	✗	Sheel Nagu (Punjab and Haryana High Court)
Dadra and Nagar Haveli and Daman and Diu	Praful Khoda Patel (Administrators)	✗	✗	✗	Alok Aradhe (Bombay High Court)
Delhi	Taranjit Singh Sandhu (Lieutenant governor)	Rekha Gupta	BJP	N.D.A.	Devendra Kumar Upadhyaya (Delhi High Court)
Jammu and Kashmir	Manoj Sinha (Lieutenant governor)	Omar Abdullah	JKNC	I.N.D.I.A	Arun Palli (High Court of Jammu and Kashmir and Ladakh)
Ladakh	Vinai Kumar Saxena (Lieutenant governor)	✗	✗	✗	Arun Palli (High Court of Jammu and Kashmir and Ladakh)
Lakshadweep	Praful Khoda Patel (Administrators)	✗	✗	✗	Nitin Madhukar Jamdar (Kerala High Court)
Puducherry	Kuniyil Kailashnathan (Lieutenant governor)	N. Rangaswamy	AINRC	N.D.A.	Kalpathi Rajendran Shriram (Madras High Court)

== Events ==
=== Scheduled events ===
- February - 2027 census of India.
- 2027 elections in India
- The Gaganyaan-4 and Gaganyaan-5 crewed test flights are planned.
