= Anuja Prabhudessai =

Indian judge

Judge of High Court of Bombay at Goa

Personal details
- Born: 8 February 1962 (age 64)

Anuja Prabhudessai (born 8 February 1962) is an Indian judge of the Bombay High Court, in Maharashtra, India. She is the first woman from Goa appointed as a High Court judge in India.

== Early life ==
Anuja Prabhudessai was born in Mapusa, Goa, India. She studied English literature and Law, and joined the bar in 1985.

== Career ==
Prabhudessai practiced law in Goa, including at the Goa bench of the Bombay High Court. She became a Civil Judge and Judicial Magistrate (First class) in 1991, and was appointed the Principal District and Sessions Judge in Panaji, Goa, in 2012. She also presided over the North Goa Children's Court and Legal Services Authority.

In March 2014, Prabhudessai became the first woman from Goa to be appointed a judge of a High Court, joining the Bombay High Court as an Additional Judge.

== Controversies ==
In 2010, Prabhudessai was suspended from her position on the grounds that she had committed an irregularity in awarding compensation to a petitioner in a motor vehicles accident claim. She was cleared of wrongdoing and reinstated by the Bombay High Court the same year. Lawyers' associations in Goa protested her suspension, and a delegation was planned, to meet the High Court and demand her reinstatement.

In 2013, a judge of the Bombay High Court charged Prabhudessai with the offence of contempt of court in relation to her refusal to grant bail in a case concerning the offence of murder. Although an inquiry officer appointed by the High Court cleared her of any wrongdoing, the Bombay High Court confirmed the finding of contempt. The Supreme Court of India allowed an appeal by Prabhudessai and removed certain comments made by the High Court, about her performance as a judge, from the record. The case was dismissed, with the Court issuing some guidelines to the Sessions Court on granting bail.

== Notable cases ==
In 2013, Prabhudessai was the judge in the widely reported case against journalist and author Tarun Tejpal, who had been arrested for sexual assault. She rejected Tejpal's plea for anticipatory bail, and allowed Goa Police to arrest him. Prabhdessai also censured Tejpal's lawyers for disclosing the identity of the complainant. The case is ongoing in Goa, with a different judge at present.

In 2017, Prabhudessai and another judge, Ranjit More, criticised the Maharashtra State Government for failing to establish a functional Police Complaints Authority despite Supreme Court directions to do so. Senior government officials were summoned to court to account for this failure, and directions were given to the State Government to ensure that the Complaints Authority would function properly. In 2020, Prabhudessai and another judge, Dipankar Datta, ordered an investigation into the conduct of the Mumbai Police after they admitted that four policemen had assaulted a suspect, resulting in his death.

In 2017, Prabhudessai and another judge, Abhay Oka, ruled that a Maharashtra Government policy framed to allow the government to grant post-facto approvals to illegal constructions was unlawful. Prabhudessai and Oka also set aside a Maharashtra Government policy that made the knowledge of the Marathi language mandatory for the grant of a permit to operate a rickshaw. In May 2017, Prabhudessai and Okay directed the Government of India to establish nodal officers who would be responsible for transmitting and serving notices from Indian courts and proceedings to persons outside India. The order criticized the Government of India for failing to systematically communicate these notices to the parties in cases, in a timely manner. In 2017, they also directed the Maharashtra Government to ensure that vacancies in state forensic laboratories were filled, noting the impact that these vacancies had in delivering justice in criminal cases.

In 2018, Prabhudessai and another judge, N.H. Patil, allowed a 13-year-old child who had survived assault and rape to terminate the resulting pregnancy. Under the Indian Medical Termination of Pregnancy Act, the termination of pregnancy is prohibited after 20 weeks of gestation. The Court made an exception in this case, after seeking advice from a medical board on the impact of the pregnancy on the physical and mental health of the child. Prabhudessai and Patil directed the State Government to clarify if there were specific guidelines to address the termination of pregnancies in cases like this.
