= Bombay High Court =

High court of Maharashtra and Goa states, India

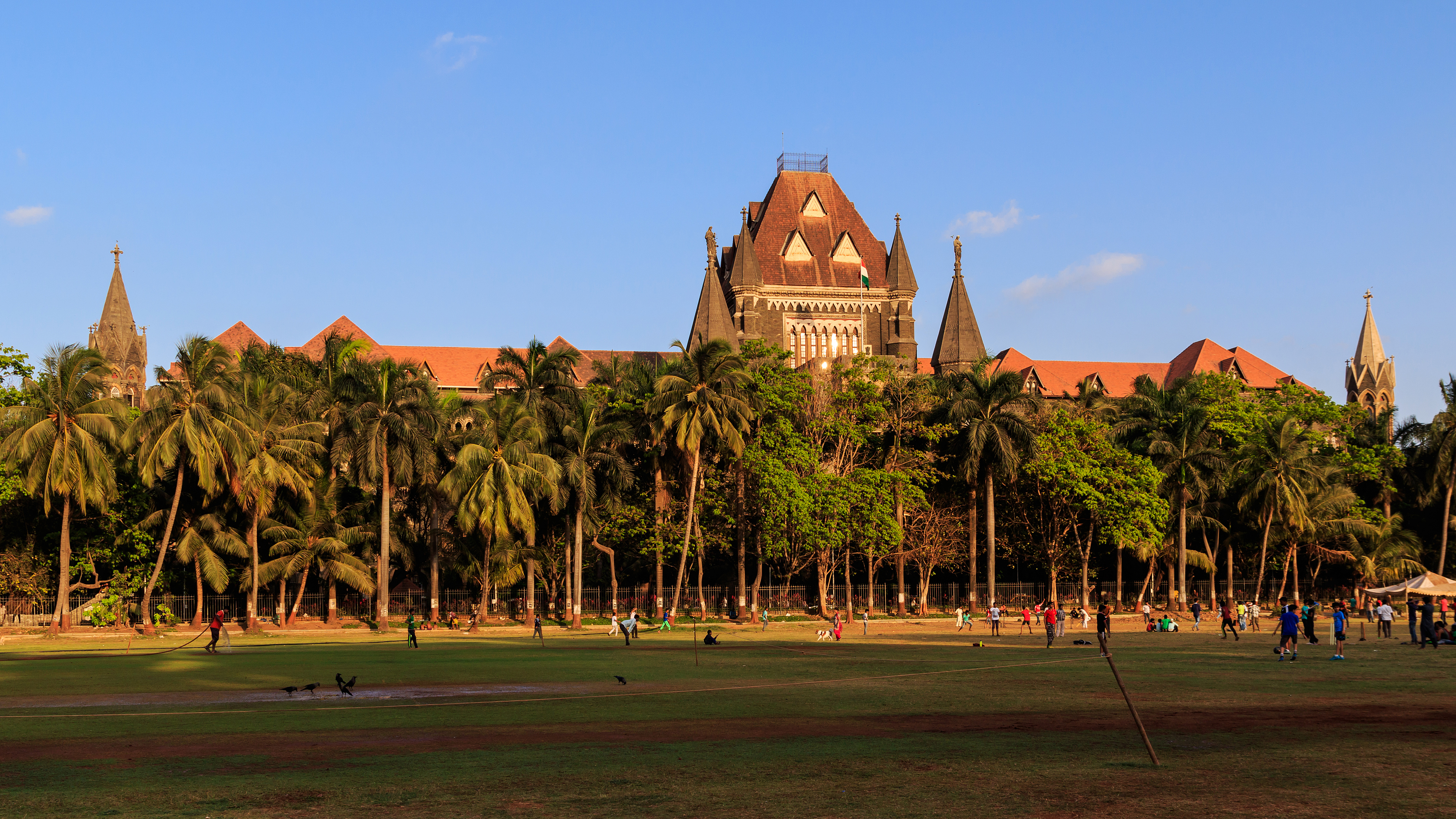
- Interactive map of Bombay High Court
- 18°55′52.26″N 72°49′49.66″E
- Established: 14 August 1862; 164 years ago
- Jurisdiction: Maharashtra; Goa; Dadra and Nagar Haveli and Daman and Diu
- Location: Principal seat: Bombay (Mumbai), Maharashtra; Circuit benches: Nagpur, Aurangabad, Porvorim, Kolhapur
- Coordinates: 18°55′52.26″N 72°49′49.66″E
- Composition method: Presidential with confirmation of Chief Justice of India and Governor of respective state.
- Authorised by: Constitution of India
- Judge term length: Mandatory retirement at age 62
- Number of positions: 94 (71 permanent, 23 additional)
- Website: Official website

Chief Justice
- Currently: Mahesh Chandra Tripathi
- Since: 9 Sep 2026

The Bombay High Court is the high court of the states of Maharashtra and Goa in India, and the union territory of Dadra and Nagar Haveli and Daman and Diu. It is seated primarily at Mumbai, also known as Bombay, and is one of the oldest high courts in India. The High Court has circuit benches at Nagpur, Aurangabad and Kolhapur in Maharashtra and at Porvorim in Goa.

The first Chief Justice, the Attorney General and the Solicitor General of independent India were from this court. Since India's independence, 27 judges from this court have been elevated to the Supreme Court and 10 have been appointed to the office of Chief Justice of India.

The court has original jurisdiction in addition to its appellate jurisdiction. Judgments issued by this court can be appealed only to the Supreme Court of India. The Bombay High Court has a sanctioned strength of 94 judges (71 permanent, 23 additional). The building is part of The Victorian and Art Deco Ensemble of Mumbai, which was added to the list of World Heritage Sites in 2018.

== History and premises ==
Bombay High Court circa 1860

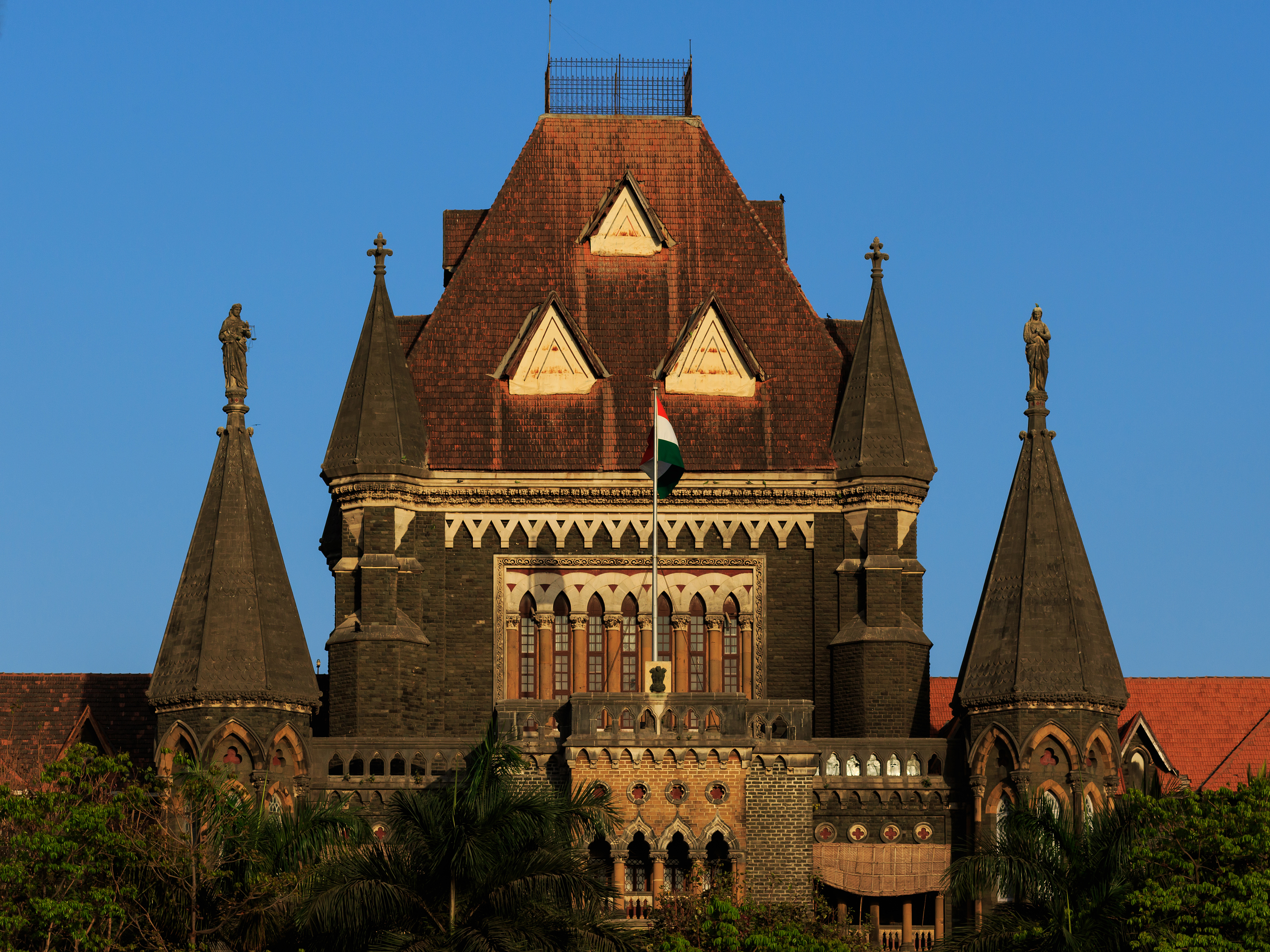
Bombay High Court, Fort, Mumbai

The Bombay High Court was inaugurated on 14 August 1862 by letters patent issued by Queen Victoria, dated 26 June 1862, under powers granted by the Indian High Courts Act 1861. It was one of the three High Courts in India established at the Presidency Towns, the others being Calcutta (capital of the Bengal Presidency) and Madras.

The work on the present building of the High Court was commenced in April 1871 and completed in November 1878. It was designed by British engineer Col. James A. Fuller. It is a Gothic Revival building in the Early English style. It is 562 feet (171 m) long and 187 feet (57 m) wide. To the west of the central tower are two octagonal towers. Statues of Justice and Mercy are atop this building. The first sitting in this building was on 10 January 1879.

Justice M. C. Chagla was the first Indian permanent Chief Justice of Bombay High Court after independence (1948–1958).

In 2016, it was announced that the premises of the Bombay High Court would be shifting to Bandra Kurla Complex.

The 125th anniversary of the building was marked by the release of a book, commissioned by the Bar Association, called The Bombay High Court: The Story of the Building – 1878–2003 by local historians Rahul Mehrotra and Sharada Dwivedi.

== Name of the court ==
Although the name of the city was officially changed from Bombay to Mumbai in 1995, the court as an institution did not follow suit and retained the name Bombay High Court. Although a bill to rename it as the Mumbai High Court was approved by the Union Cabinet on 5 July 2016, along with the changes of name of the Calcutta High Court and Madras High Court to Kolkata High Court and Chennai High Court respectively, the same is pending approval before the Parliament of India but may not be enacted for some time.

== Principal seat and benches ==
The court has jurisdiction over the states of Maharashtra, Goa and the Union territories of Daman and Diu and Dadra and Nagar Haveli. The court has benches in Nagpur, Aurangabad and Panaji. Bombay High Court set up its fourth bench in Kolhapur on 18 August 2025.

| Bench | Judge strength | Territorial jurisdiction |
|---|---|---|
| Bombay(Principal) | 30 | Mumbai (City), Mumbai (Suburban), Thane, Palghar, Nashik, Pune, Raigad, Dadra & Nagar Haveli at Silvassa, Daman, Diu. |
| Aurangabad | 18 | Chh. Sambhajinagar, Ahilyanagar, Beed, Dhule, Jalna, Jalgaon, Latur, Nanded, Dharashiv, Parbhani, Nandurbar, Hingoli |
| Nagpur | 17 | Nagpur, Akola, Amravati, Bhandara, Buldhana, Chandrapur, Wardha, Yavatmal, Gondia, Gadchiroli, Washim |
| Kolhapur | 06 | Kolhapur, Ratnagiri, Satara, Sangli, Sindhudurg, Solapur |
| Panaji | 04 | North Goa (Panaji), South Goa (Margao) |
| Total | 75* | |

*TBC

=== Nagpur bench ===
Nagpur is an industrial and commercial city situated in the centre of India. Formerly, it was the capital of the former State of CP & Berar, later old Madhya Pradesh and now it is the sub-capital of the State of Maharashtra. A full-fledged High Court was established at Nagpur on 9 January 1936 and contracted by Sir Sobha Singh. Later it was included as a separate bench in the Bombay High Court jurisdiction after the formation of the state of Maharashtra in 1960.

==== History ====
Sir Gilbert Stone, a Judge of the Madras High Court was appointed as first Chief Justice. The foundation stone of the new building (present High Court building) was laid by late Sir Hyde Gowan on 9 January 1937. The building was designed by Mr. H.A.N. Medd, Resident Architect. It was constructed at a cost of Rs.737,746/-.The building consisted of two stories with a garden courtyard in the centre. The outside dimensions are 400 ft x 230 ft. The original design provided for a main central dome rising 109 feet above ground land, the remainder of the building being approximately 52 feet in height. The building has been constructed with sandstone. The building has Ashlar stone facing and brick hearting. The flooring in the corridors and offices is of Sikosa and Shahabad flag stones. The building is declared open on 6 January 1940. On the opening ceremony the Viceroy of India described this building as a poem in stone. The High Court has a fairly well planned garden on the eastern as well as western sides.

The High Court of Judicature at Nagpur continued to be housed in this building till the reorganisation of states in 1956. With effect from 1 November 1956, eight Marathi speaking districts of Vidarbha formed part of the greater bilingual State of Bombay which came into existence. Remaining fourteen Hindi speaking districts of the former State of Madhya Pradesh became part of the newly constituted State of Madhya Pradesh with the capital at Bhopal. The High Court of Madhya Pradesh was treated as the successor of the former High Court at Nagpur.

==== New building ====
A bench of the High Court at Bombay began to sit in this building at Nagpur with effect from 1 November 1956 and continues to do so even after the formation of the State of Maharashtra on 1 May 1960. During the year 1960 the strength of this Bench consisted of four Honourable Judges.

The extension of High Court building consists of two annex buildings on both sides of the existing building viz., North and South Wings. For this Government of Maharashtra has sanctioned Rs. 1,2,926,605/- on dated 21 March 1983. 'South Wing' houses various utilities for the public, i.e. litigants and the Bar as well as High Court Government Pleader's Establishment including Standing Counsel for Central Government and 'A Panel Counsels, and also for the establishment. In the North Wing, it is proposed to accommodate additional Court Halls, Chambers of the Hobble Judges, Judges' Library and the office.

Presently, the strength of this Bench consists of 10 Honourable Judges and total employees are 412.

=== Aurangabad bench ===
The Aurangabad bench was established in 1982. Initially, only a few districts of Maharashtra were under the Aurangabad bench. Subsequently, in 1988, Ahmednagar & other districts were attached to the bench. The bench at Aurangabad has more than 13 judges. The jurisdiction of the Aurangabad Bench is over Aurangabad, Dhule, Nandurbar, Jalna, Jalgaon, Beed, Parbhani, Latur & Osmanabad. The bench also has a Bar Council of Maharashtra & Goa office. The present building of bench is situated in huge premises. The garden is beautifully maintained. Lush green grass invites the attention of any passerby. The HC bench at Aurangabad is approximately 4 km from the Aurangabad Airport and around 6 km from the central bus stand. The new building has 13 court halls in all now including two new ones. All the court halls are on the first floor of the building, while the registry of the Court is on the ground floor. The Aurangabad bench has a strong Bar of more than 1000 advocates, but the Aurangabad bench does not have jurisdiction over company law matters.

The Aurangabad Bench celebrated its 28th anniversary on 27 August 2009.

==== History ====
Due to the continued demand of the people of Marathwada region for the establishment of a permanent Bench of the High Court at Aurangabad under sub-section (2) of Sec. 51 of the Act, the State Government first took up the issue with the then Chief Justice R. M. Kantawala in 1977. On 22 March 1978, the State Legislative Assembly passed a unanimous resolution supporting a demand for the establishment of a permanent Bench of the High Court at Aurangabad to the effect : "With a view to save huge expenses and to reduce the inconvenience of the people of the Marathwada and Pune regions in connection with legal proceedings, this Assembly recommends to the Government to make a request to the President to establish a permanent Bench of the Bombay High Court having jurisdiction in Marathwada and Pune regions, one at Aurangabad and the other at Pune."

The said demand for the constitution of a permanent Bench of the High Court at Aurangabad was supported by the State Bar Council of Maharashtra, the Advocates' Association of Western India, several bar associations and people in general. It is necessary here to mention that the resolution as originally moved made a demand for the setting up of a permanent Bench of the High Court of Bombay at Aurangabad for the Marathwada region, and there was, no reference to Pune which was added by way of amendment. Initially, the State Government recommended to the Central Government in 1978 to establish two permanent Benches under sub-sec. (2) of Section 51 of the Act, one at Aurangabad and the other at Pune, but later in 1981 confined its recommendation to Aurangabad alone.

The State Government thereafter took a Cabinet decision in January 1981 to establish a permanent Bench of the High Court at Aurangabad and this was conveyed by the Secretary to the Government of Maharashtra, Law & Judiciary Department, communicated by his letter dated 3 February 1981 to the Registrar and he was requested, with the permission of the Chief Justice, to submit proposals regarding accommodation for the Court and residential bungalows for the Judges, staff, furniture, etc. necessary for setting up the Bench. As a result of this communication, the Chief Justice wrote to the Chief Minister on 26 February 1981 signifying his consent to the establishment of a permanent Bench at Aurangabad. After adverting to the fact that his predecessors had opposed such a move and had indicated, amongst other things, that such a step involved, as it does, breaking up of the integrity of the institution and the Bar, which would necessarily impair the quality and quantity of the disposals.

It, however, became evident by the middle of June 1981 that the Central Government would take time in reaching a decision on the proposal for the establishment of a permanent Bench under sub-sec. (2) of Section 51 of the Act at Aurangabad as the question involved a much larger issue, viz. the principles to be adopted and the criterion laid down for the establishment of permanent Benches of High Courts generally. This meant that there would be an inevitable delay in securing the concurrence of the Central Government and the issuance of a Presidential Notification under sub-sec. (2) of S. 51 of the Act. On 19 June 1981, the State Government accordingly took a Cabinet decision pending the establishment of a permanent Bench under sub-sec. (2) of S. 51 of the Act at Aurangabad for the Marathwada region, resort be had to the provisions of sub-section (3) thereof. On 20 June 1981, the Secretary to the Government of Maharashtra, Law & Judiciary Department wrote to the Registrar stating that there was a possibility of a delay in securing concurrence of the Central Government and the issuance of a notification by the President under subsection (2) of S. 51 of the Act for the establishment of a permanent Bench at Auangabad and in order to tide over the difficulty, the provisions of sub-sec. (3) of Section 51 of the Act may be resorted to and he, therefore, requested the Chief Justice to favour the Government With his views on the matter at an early date. On 5 July 1981, the Law Secretary waited on the Chief Justice in that connection. On 7 July 1981 the Chief Justice wrote a letter to the Chief Minister in which he stated that the Law Secretary had conveyed to him the decision of the State Government to have a Circuit Bench at Auangabad under sub-sec. (3) of Section 51 pending the decision of the Central Government to establish a permanent Bench there under sub-section (2) of S. 51 of the Act. The Chief Justice then added: "I agree that some such step is necessary in view of the preparations made by the Government at huge costs and the mounting expectations of the people there."

==== Formation ====
On 20 July 1981, the Law Secretary addressed a letter to the Registrar requesting him to forward, with the permission of the Chief Justice, a proposal as is required under sub-section (3) of S. 51 for the setting up of a Bench at Auangabad . In reply to the same, the Registrar by his letter dated 24 July 1981 conveyed that the Chief Justice agreed with the suggestion of the State Government that action had to be taken under sub-section (3) of S. 51 of the Act for which the approval of the Governor was necessary and he enclosed a copy of the draft order which the Chief Justice proposed to issue under sub-section (3) of S. 51 of the Act. On 10 August 1981, the Law Secretary conveyed to the Registrar the approval of the Governor. On 27 August 1981, the Chief Justice issued an order under sub-section (3) of S. 51 of the Act to the effect: "In exercise of the powers conferred by sub-section (3) of S. 51 of the States Reorganisation Act, 1956 (No. 37 of 1956) and all other powers enabling him on this behalf, the Hon'ble the Chief Justice, with the approval of the Governor of Maharashtra, is pleased to appoint Aurangabad as a place at which the Hon'ble Judges and Division Courts of the High Court of Judicature at Bombay may also sit." This is the history of how the Aurangabad Bench of the Bombay High Court was constituted. The Constitution of the Bench by The Hon’ble Chief Justice V.S.Deshpande then came to be challenged before the Hon’ble Supreme Court. The Petition filed by the State of Maharashtra was allowed and the people's aspirations from Marathwada were recognized. The Judgment is a reported one (State of Maharashtra v. Narain Shyamrao Puranik) in AIR 1983 Supreme Court 46.

=== Goa bench ===
When the High Court of Bombay constituted a bench in Porvorim, Goa, Justice G.F Couto was appointed its first Goan permanent judge. Justice G.D. Kamath was appointed as judge in 1983 and later in 1996 as Chief Justice of the Gujarat High Court. Justice E.S da Silva was elevated in 1990 and was a judge of this court till his retirement in 1995. Justice R.K. Batta and Justice R.M.S. Khandeparkar were Judges of the Goa bench for 8 and 12 years respectively. Justice F.I Rebello, was appointed Chief Justice of the Allahabad High Court in 2010 and retired in 2011. Justice Nelson Britto was Judge for five years. Justice A.P Lavande, Justice F.M.Reis, and Justice M.S. Sonak, were senior lawyers who practiced in the Goa Bench before their elevation. Presently Goa has one lady judge, Justice Anuja Prabhudesai. Justice A Prabhudesai and retired Justice Nutan Sardesai who were both District Judges.

==== History ====
Prior to the annexation of Goa, Daman and Diu the highest Court for the then Portuguese State of India was the Tribunal da Relação de Goa functioning at Panjim. Originally established in 1554, the Relação de Goa used to serve as the high court of appeal for all the Portuguese East Indies territories of the Indian Ocean and the Far East, including what are now Mozambique, Macau and East Timor, besides India itself. The Relação de Goa was abolished when a Court of Judicial Commissioner was established w.e.f. 16 December 1963 under Goa-Daman & Diu (Judicial Commissioner Court) Regulation, 1963. In May 1964 an Act was passed by the Parliament which conferred upon the Court of Judicial Commissioner, some powers of the High Court for the purposes of the Constitution of India.

Parliament by an Act extended the jurisdiction of High Court at Bombay to the Union territory of Goa Daman & Diu and established a permanent Bench of that High Court at Panaji on 30 October 1982

From its inception, the Hon'ble Shri Justice Dr. G.F.Couto who was at that time acting Judicial Commissioner was elevated to the Bench of High Court of Bombay. The Hon'ble Shri Justice G.D.Kamat was elevated to the Bench on 29 August 1983.

With the passing of Goa, Daman & Re-organization Act, 1987 by the Parliament conferring Statehood to Goa, the High Court of Bombay became the common High Court for the states of Maharashtra and Goa and the Union territories of Dadra & Nagar Haveli and Daman & Diu w.e.f. 30 May 1987.

==== First Relocation ====
The High Court was shifted from the old building of Tribunal da Relação to Lyceum Complex at Altinho, Panaji and started functioning there from 3 November 1997. The main building at the said Complex, constructed in the year 1925 by the Portuguese Government, was renovated by the Goa state government and inaugurated by the Hon'ble Chief Justice of Bombay High Court Shri M.B.Shah on 2 October 1997.The Hon'ble Chief Justice of Bombay High Court, Shri Y. K. Sabharwal, inaugurated the 2nd building on 9 September 1999. Both these buildings now house several departments of the Bombay high court – panaji bench.

==== Second Relocation ====
Due to the space crunch in the lyseum complex, a new building complex is being built in alto – betim porvorim region in Porvorim. The new building was inaugurated on 27 March 2021. The first court hearing in the new building was presided on by the divisional bench composed of Chief Justice of the Bombay high court Dipankar Datta and Justice Mahesh Sonak on 17 August 2021.

=== Kolhapur Bench ===
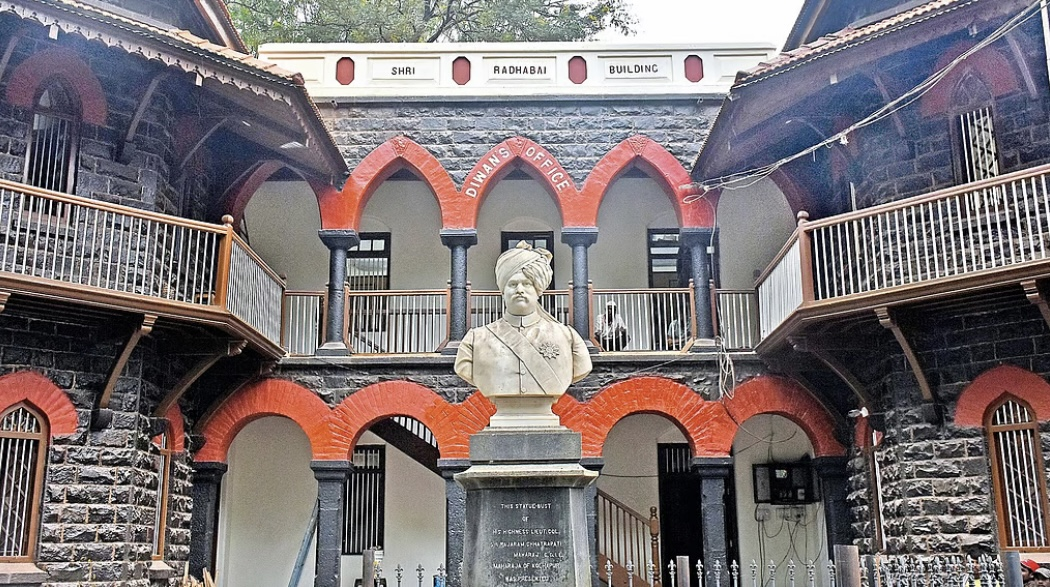

The Bombay High Court got a new circuit bench in Kolhapur district in western Maharashtra, with its sittings commencing on 18 August. The establishment of this bench made it the fourth such bench for the High Court in the state.

A notification in this regard was issued on Friday, 1 August 2025 by High Court Chief Justice Alok Aradhe.

"I, Alok Aradhe, Chief Justice of the High Court at Bombay, with the approval of the Governor of Maharashtra, appoint Kolhapur as a place at which Judges and Division Courts of the High Court may also sit, with effect from August 18, 2025," the notification said.

The new Bench is likely to have jurisdiction over six districts — Satara, Sangli, Solapur, Kolhapur, Ratnagiri and Sindhudurg (last two located in coastal Konkan region).

== Sesquicentennial celebrations ==
In 2010, the High Court organized several functions to mark the completion of 150 years of the establishment of the High Court. A special postal cover was released by Milind Deora, the then Minister of State for Communications and Information Technology at the historical Central Court Hall of the High Court on 14 August 2012.

An exhibition displaying important artifacts, royal charters, stamps, old maps and other documents of historical importance was inaugurated by the then Chief Minister of Maharashtra, Prithviraj Chavan, in the Central Court Hall on 15 August 2012. The then Prime Minister of India, Dr. Manmohan Singh was the Chief Guest at the concluding ceremony of the year-long Sesquicentennial celebrations on 18 August 2012.

A book titled A Heritage of Judging: The Bombay High Court through one hundred and fifty years, edited by Dhananjaya Y. Chandrachud, Anoop V. Mohta and Roshan S. Dalvi was published by the Maharashtra Judicial Academy.

== Famous cases ==
The Bombay High Court has been the site for numerous trials and court cases. Bal Gangadhar Tilak was tried a number of times in the Bombay High Court, but the most famous was his trial for sedition in the 1916 case Emperor v. Bal Gangadhar Tilak.

=== Controversies ===
Bar Council had boycotted some judges of the High Court in 1991 under the leadership of Senior Counsel Iqbal Chagla. In 2011, a couple of petitions came to be filed challenging housing societies built by judges upon plots of land reserved for other purposes.

In November 2021, the Bombay High Court issued a controversial criminal case against AstraZeneca for misinformation and misleading claims regarding the safety of their vaccines. The suit claims this misinformation is responsible for the death of the afflicted. Some rumors appeared that the suit was against Bill Gates for partial funding of AstraZeneca, but these rumors were fake. The suit is addressed to both The State of Maharashtra and AstraZeneca.

In February 2022, Pushpa Virendra Ganediwala, an additional judge, was forced to resign, after a series of poor judgements in cases related to sexual assault. As a result of her judgements, Ganediwala was denied elevation and was not made permanent, after the Supreme Court stated decided that she would be demoted to district judiciary.

In June 2024, the Bombay High Court passed an order to release Vedant Agarwal, a minor teenager, after he was involved in a hit and run case while driving a Porsche Taycan under influence of alcohol in Pune, killing 2 software engineers, under care and custody of his maternal aunt. The order received backlash from a victim's mother and from the public.

In March 2025, the Bombay High Court reduced sentence of a convicted rapist from life imprisonment to 10 years for the rape of a 1.5 year old. The judgement received extensive backlash from legal experts and former judges, as the case fell under the purview of Protection of Children from Sexual Offences Act, which was enacted to ensure harsh punishment for culprits involved in sexual assault of minor children.

During the 2025 India–Pakistan conflict that occurred after the Pahalgam terrorist attack, the Bombay High Court was criticized for granting bail to an engineering student Khadija Sheikh, after she posted about criticism of Operation Sindoor on social media and expressed support for Pakistan. Sheikh was expelled from the institution and faced criminal charges for her Pro-Pakistan posts that were deleted later, which she petitioned to be revoked in court during her bail application.

On 21 July 2025, the Bombay High Court acquitted 12 accused involved in the 2006 terror attacks on Mumbai Suburban Railway and refused to confirm the death sentence of 5 among the accused. The acquittal sparked backlash among the victims and police officers who investigated the attack, including former ATS chief K.P. Raghuvanshi, as the bench of judges stated that the evidence relied on by the prosecution was not conclusive to convict the accused and ordered the immediate release. The Maharashtra Government filed an appeal with the Supreme Court following the verdict.

== Chief Justice and Judges ==
The Bombay High Court sits at Mumbai, the capital of the state of Maharashtra, and has additional benches in Aurangabad and Nagpur and Kolhapur Maharashtra, as well as Panaji in the state of Goa. It may have a maximum of 94 judges, of which 71 must be permanently appointed and 23 may be additionally appointed. Currently, it has a total of 66 Judges.

== Former Chief Justices ==
| No. | Portrait | Judge | Term start | Term end |
Supreme Court of Bombay
| 1 | | William Syer | 1798 | Died 1802 |
| 2 | | James Mackintosh | 1803 | |
| 3 | | John Henry Newbolt | 1811 | |
| 4 | | Alexander Anstruther | 1812 | Died 1819 |
| 5 | | D. Evans | 1820 | Died 1821 |
| 6 | | Edward West | 1822 | Became Chief Justice of Supreme Court, 1823 |
| 6 | | Edward West | 1823 | first year was in the Recorder's Court |
| 7 | | James Dewar | 1829 | |
| 8 | | Herbert Abingdon Draper Compton | 1831 | |
| 9 | | John Wither Awdry | 1839 | |
| 10 | | Henry Roper | 1840 | |
| 11 | | David Pollock | 1846 | |
| 12 | | Thomas Erskine Perry | 1847 | |
| 13 | | William Yardley | 1852 | |
| 14 | | Matthew Richard Sausse | 1859 | 13 August 1862 |
Bombay High Court
| 1 | | Matthew Richard Sausse | 14 August 1862 | 27 April 1866 |
| 2 | | Richard Couch | 28 April 1866 | 31 March 1870 |
| 3 | | Michael Roberts Westropp | 1 April 1870 | 8 August 1882 |
| 4 | | Charles Sargent | 9 August 1882 | 19 June 1895 |
| 5 | | Charles Frederick Farran | 20 June 1895 | 9 September 1898 |
| 6 | | Louis Addin Kershaw | 12 November 1898 | 17 February 1899 |
| 7 | | Lawrence Hugh Jenkins | 20 April 1899 | 14 March 1909 |
| 8 | | Basil Scott | 22 April 1908 | 31 May 1919 |
| 9 | | Norman Cranstoun Macleod | 1 June 1919 | 6 June 1926 |
| 10 | | Amberson Barrington Marten | 7 June 1926 | 17 June 1930 |
| 11 | | John William Fisher Beaumont | 20 June 1930 | 29 September 1943 |
| 12 | | Leonard Stone | 30 September 1943 | 15 August 1947 |
| 13 | | Mahommedali Currim Chagla | 3 January 1948 | 26 October 1958 |
| 14 | | Hashmatrai Khubchand Chainani | 27 October 1958 | 28 November 1965 |
| 15 | | Yeshwant Shripad Tambe | 7 February 1966 | 31 July 1966 |
| 16 | | Sohrab Peshotan Kotval | 1 August 1966 | 27 September 1972 |
| 17 | | Kapil Kalyandas Desai | 28 September 1972 | 27 October 1972 |
| 18 | | Ramanlal Maneklal Kantawala | 28 October 1972 | 5 October 1978 |
| 19 | | Balkrishna Narhar Deshmukh | 6 October 1978 | 18 November 1980 |
| 20 | | Venkat Shrinivas Deshpande | 12 January 1981 | 10 August 1982 |
| 21 | | Dinshah Pirosha Madon | 31 August 1982 | 14 March 1983 |
| 22 | | Madhukar Narhar Chandurkar | 15 March 1983 | 2 April 1984 |
| 23 | | Konda Madhava Reddy | 8 April 1984 | 21 October 1985 |
| 24 | | Madhukar Hiralal Kania | 23 June 1986 | 30 April 1987 |
| 25 | | Chittatosh Mookerjee | 2 November 1987 | 1 January 1991 |
| 26 | | Prabodh Dinkarrao Desai | 7 January 1991 | 14 December 1992 |
| 27 | | Manoj Kumar Mukherjee | 9 January 1993 | 14 December 1993 |
| 28 | | Sujata Manohar | 15 January 1994 | 20 April 1994 |
| 29 | | Anandamoy Bhattacharjee | 21 April 1994 | 1 April 1995 |
| 30 | | Manharlal Bhikhalal Shah | 2 August 1995 | 8 December 1998 |
| 31 | Yogesh Kumar Sabharwal | Yogesh Kumar Sabharwal | 3 February 1999 | 28 January 2000 |
| 32 | | Bisheshwar Prasad Singh | 31 March 2000 | 13 December 2001 |
| 33 | | Chunilal Karsandas Thakker | 31 December 2001 | 6 June 2004 |
| 34 | | Dalveer Bhandari | 25 July 2004 | 27 October 2005 |
| 35 | | Kshitij Rameshbhai Vyas | 25 February 2006 | 18 July 2006 |
| 36 | | Harjit Singh Bedi | 3 October 2006 | 11 January 2007 |
| 37 | | Swatanter Kumar | 31 March 2007 | 17 December 2009 |
| 38 | | Anil Ramesh Dave | 11 February 2010 | 29 April 2010 |
| 39 | | Mohit Shantilal Shah | 26 June 2010 | 8 September 2015 |
| 40 | | Dhirendra Hiralal Waghela | 15 February 2016 | 10 August 2016 |
| 41 | | Manjula Chellur | 22 August 2016 | 4 December 2017 |
| 42 | | Naresh Harishchandra Patil | 29 October 2018 | 6 April 2019 |
| 43 | | Pradeep Nandrajog | 7 April 2019 | 23 February 2020 |
| 44 | | Bhushan Pradyumna Dharmadhikari | 20 March 2020 | 27 April 2020 |
| 45 | | Dipankar Datta | 28 April 2020 | 11 December 2022 |
| 46 | | Ramesh Deokinandan Dhanuka | 28 May 2023 | 30 May 2023 |
| 47 | | Devendra Kumar Upadhyaya | 29 July 2023 | 20 January 2025 |
| 48 | | Alok Aradhe | 21 January 2025 | 28 August 2025 |
| 49 | | Shree Chandrashekhar | 5 September 2025 | 1 June 2026 |

== Judges elevated as Chief Justices ==
This sections contains list of only those judges elevated as chief justices whose parent high court is Bombay. This includes those judges who, at the time of appointment as chief justice, may not be serving in Bombay High Court but this list does not include judges who at the time of appointment as chief justice were serving in Bombay High Court but does not have Bombay as their Parent High Court.

Colour Key

- Female Chief Justice
- Served as Chief Justice of India

Symbol Key

- ^{‡} Elevated to Supreme Court of India
- ^{RES} Resigned
- ^{†} Died in office

| Name | Image | Appointed as CJ in HC of | Date of appointment | | Date of retirement (Note: this includes date of resignation, death and elevation to supreme court) | Tenure | | Ref.. |
| Name | Image | Appointed as CJ in HC of | As Judge | As Chief Justice | Date of retirement | As Chief Justice | As Judge (Note: also includes tenure as Chief Justice) | Ref.. |
|---|---|---|---|---|---|---|---|---|
| Richard Couch | | Bombay, transferred to Calcutta | 14 August 1862 | 3 March 1866 | 5 April 1875^{[RES]} | 9 years, 34 days | 12 years, 235 days | |
| Michael Roberts Westropp | | Bombay | 1863 | 1 April 1870 | 8 August 1882 | 12 years, 130 days | | |
| Charles Sargent | | Bombay | 3 March 1866 | 9 August 1882 | 19 June 1895 | 12 years, 315 days | 29 years, 109 days | |
| Charles Frederick Farran | | Bombay | 1890 | 20 June 1895 | 9 September 1898^{[†]} | 3 years, 82 days | | |
| Arthur Strachey | | Allahabad | 1895 | 12 November 1898 | 14 May 1901^{[†]} | 2 years, 184 days | | |
| Norman Cranstoun Macleod | | Bombay | 1910 | 1 June 1919 | 6 June 1926 | 7 years, 6 days | | |
| Amberson Barrington Marten | | Bombay | 1916 | 7 June 1926 | 17 June 1930^{[RES]} | 4 years, 11 days | | |
| Mahommedali Currim Chagla | | Bombay | 4 August 1941 | 6 February 1948 | 26 October 1958^{[RES]} | 10 years, 257 days | 17 years, 78 days | |
| Eric Weston | | Punjab & Haryana | 14 January 1943 | 21 January 1950 | 8 December 1952 | 2 years, 323 days | 9 years, 330 days | |
| Hashmatrai Khubchand Chainani | | Bombay | 28 August 1948 | 27 October 1958 | 28 November 1965^{[†]} | 7 years, 33 days | 17 years, 93 days | |
| Sunderlal Trikamlal Desai | | Gujarat | 9 October 1952 | 1 May 1960 | 25 January 1961 | 270 days | 8 years, 109 days | |
| Kantilal Thakoredas Desai | | Gujarat | 6 January 1957 | 26 January 1961 | 22 May 1963 | 2 years, 117 days | 6 years, 137 days | |
| Jaishanker Manilal Shelat | | Gujarat | 6 January 1957 | 31 May 1963 | 23 February 1966^{[‡]} | 2 years, 269 days | 9 years, 49 days | |
| Nomanbhai Mahmedbhai Miabhoy | | Gujarat | 22 March 1957 | 21 April 1966 | 5 September 1967 | 1 year, 138 days | 10 years, 168 days | |
| Kapil Kalyandas Desai | | Bombay | 18 August 1958 | 28 September 1972 | 27 October 1972 | 30 days | 14 years, 71 days | |
| Ramanlal Maneklal Kantawala | | Bombay | 9 February 1962 | 28 October 1972 | 5 October 1978 | 5 years, 343 days | 16 years, 239 days | |
| Balkrishna Narhar Deshmukh | | Bombay | 7 June 1965 | 6 October 1978 | 18 November 1980 | 2 years, 44 days | 15 years, 165 days | |
| Venkat Shrinivas Deshpande | | Bombay | 11 June 1967 | 12 January 1981 | 10 August 1982 | 1 year, 211 days | 15 years, 61 days | |
| Dinshah Pirosha Madon | | Bombay | 25 September 1967 | 31 August 1982 | 14 March 1983^{[‡]} | 196 days | 15 years, 171 days | |
| Madhukar Narhar Chandurkar | | Bombay, transferred to Madras | 28 October 1967 | 2 January 1984 | 13 March 1988 | 4 years, 72 days | 20 years, 138 days | |
| Madhukar Hiralal Kania | | Bombay | 4 November 1969 | 23 June 1986 | 30 April 1987^{[‡]} | 312 days | 17 years, 178 days | |
| Subhash Chhaganlal Pratap | | Andhra Pradesh | 19 September 1977 | 5 April 1991 | 1 November 1992 | 1 year, 211 days | 15 years, 44 days | |
| Sam Piroj Bharucha | | Karnataka | 19 September 1977 | 1 November 1991 | 30 June 1992^{[‡]} | 243 days | 14 years, 286 days | |
| Sujata Manohar | | Bombay, transferred to Kerala | 23 January 1978 | 15 January 1994 | 4 November 1994^{[‡]} | 294 days | 16 years, 289 days | |
| Madhav Laxman Pendse | | Karnataka | 25 January 1978 | 28 July 1995 | 25 March 1996^{[RES]} | 242 days | 18 years, 61 days | |
| Sudhakar Panditrao Kurdukar | | Punjab & Haryana | 25 April 1978 | 16 January 1994 | 27 March 1996^{[‡]} | 2 years, 72 days | 17 years, 339 days | |
| Vallabhdas Aidan Mohta | | Orissa | 27 April 1979 | 28 September 1994 | 25 April 1995 | 210 days | 15 years, 364 days | |
| Gurudas Datta Kamat | | Gujarat | 29 August 1983 | 2 July 1996 | 4 January 1997 | 187 days | 13 years, 129 days | |
| Ashok Chhotelal Agarwal | | Madras | 21 November 1986 | 24 May 1999 | 26 August 1999 | 95 days | 12 years, 279 days | |
| Sam Nariman Variava | | Delhi | 21 November 1986 | 25 May 1999 | 14 March 2000^{[‡]} | 295 days | 13 years, 115 days | |
| Ashok Desai | | Uttarakhand | 21 November 1986 | 6 December 2000 | 31 March 2003^{[RES]} | 2 years, 116 days | 16 years, 131 days | |
| Arvind Vinayakarao Savant | | Kerala | 30 July 1990 | 30 May 2000 | 16 September 2000 | 110 days | 10 years, 49 days | |
| Bellur Narayanswamy Srikrishna | | Kerala | 30 July 1990 | 7 September 2001 | 1 October 2002^{[‡]} | 1 year, 25 days | 12 years, 65 days | |
| Sarosh Homi Kapadia | | Uttarakhand | 8 October 1991 | 5 August 2003 | 17 December 2003^{[‡]} | 135 days | 12 years, 71 days | |
| Vikas Sridhar Sirpurkar | | Uttarakhand, transferred to Calcutta | 9 November 1992 | 25 July 2004 | 11 January 2007^{[‡]} | 2 years, 171 days | 14 years, 64 days | |
| Ajit Prakash Shah | | Madras, transferred to Delhi | 18 December 1992 | 12 November 2005 | 12 February 2010 | 4 years, 93 days | 17 years, 57 days | |
| Hemant Laxman Gokhale | | Allahabad, transferred to Madras | 20 January 1994 | 7 March 2007 | 28 April 2010^{[‡]} | 3 years, 53 days | 16 years, 100 days | |
| Jai Narayan Patel | | Calcutta | 11 March 1996 | 26 June 2010 | 4 October 2012 | 2 years, 101 days | 16 years, 208 days | |
| Ferdino Inacio Rebello | | Allahabad | 15 April 1996 | 26 June 2010 | 30 July 2011 | 1 year, 35 days | 15 years, 107 days | |
| Sharad Arvind Bobde | | Madhya Pradesh | 29 March 2000 | 16 October 2012 | 11 April 2013^{[‡]} | 178 days | 13 years, 14 days | |
| Ajay Manikrao Khanwilkar | | Himachal Pradesh, transferred to Madhya Pradesh | 29 March 2000 | 4 April 2013 | 12 May 2016^{[‡]} | 3 years, 39 days | 16 years, 45 days | |
| Dhananjaya Yeshwant Chandrachud | | Allahabad | 29 March 2000 | 31 October 2013 | 12 May 2016^{[‡]} | 2 years, 195 days | 16 years, 45 days | |
| Dilip Babasaheb Bhosale | | Allahabad | 22 January 2001 | 30 July 2016 | 23 October 2018 | 2 years, 86 days | 17 years, 275 days | |
| Shiavax Jal Vazifdar | | Punjab & Haryana | 22 January 2001 | 7 August 2016 | 3 May 2018 | 1 year, 270 days | 17 years, 102 days | |
| Vijaya Kamlesh Tahilramani | | Madras | 26 June 2001 | 12 August 2018 | 6 September 2019^{[RES]} | 1 year, 26 days | 18 years, 73 days | |
| Naresh Harishchandra Patil | | Bombay | 12 October 2001 | 29 October 2018 | 6 April 2019 | 160 days | 17 years, 177 days | |
| Abhay Shreeniwas Oka | | Karnataka | 29 August 2003 | 10 May 2019 | 30 August 2021^{[‡]} | 2 years, 113 days | 18 years, 2 days | |
| Bhushan Pradyumna Dharmadhikari | | Bombay | 15 March 2004 | 20 March 2020 | 27 April 2020 | 39 days | 16 years, 44 days | |
| Ranjit Vasantrao More | | Meghalaya | 8 September 2006 | 12 October 2021 | 3 November 2021 | 23 days | 15 years, 57 days | |
| Amjad Ahtesham Sayed | | Himachal Pradesh | 11 April 2007 | 23 June 2022 | 20 January 2023 | 212 days | 15 years, 285 days | |
| Sambhaji Shiwaji Shinde | | Rajasthan | 17 March 2008 | 21 June 2022 | 1 August 2022 | 42 days | 14 years, 138 days | |
| Prasanna Bhalachandra Varale | | Karnataka | 18 July 2008 | 15 October 2022 | 24 January 2024^{[‡]} | 1 year, 102 days | 15 years, 190 days | |
| Sanjay Vijaykumar Gangapurwala | | Madras | 13 March 2010 | 28 May 2023 | 23 May 2024 | 362 days | 14 years, 72 days | |
| Ramesh Deokinandan Dhanuka | | Bombay | 23 January 2012 | 28 May 2023 | 30 May 2023 | 3 days | 11 years, 128 days | |
| Nitin Madhukar Jamdar | | Kerala | 23 January 2012 | 26 September 2024 | 9 January 2026 | 1 year, 106 days | 13 years, 352 days | |
| Kalpathi Rajendran Shriram | | Madras, transferred to Rajasthan | 21 June 2013 | 27 September 2024 | 27 September 2025 | 1 year, 1 day | 12 years, 99 days | |
| Revati Mohite Dere | | Meghalaya | 21 June 2013 | 10 January 2026 | Incumbent | 302 days | 13 years, 140 days | |
| Mahesh Sharadchandra Sonak | | Jharkhand | 21 June 2013 | 9 January 2026 | Incumbent | 303 days | 13 years, 140 days | |
| Ravindra Vithalrao Ghuge | | Calcutta | 21 June 2013 | 9 September 2026 | Incumbent | 60 days | 13 years, 140 days | |

=== Judges appointed as Acting Chief Justice ===
| Name | Appointed as ACJ in HC of | Date of appointment as Judge | Period as Acting Chief Justice | Date of retirement | Tenure as ACJ | Tenure as Judge | Remarks | Ref.. |
|---|---|---|---|---|---|---|---|---|
| M. C. Chagla | Bombay | 5 August 1941 | 3 Jan 1948 – 5 Feb 1948 | 26 October 1958^{[RES]} | 34 days | 17 years, 77 days | Became permanent | |
| J. M. Shelat | Gujarat | 6 January 1957 | 23 May 1963 – 30 May 1963 | 23 February 1966^{[‡]} | 8 days | 9 years, 49 days | Became permanent | |
| N. M. Miabhoy | Gujarat | 22 March 1957 | 24 Feb 1966 – 20 Apr 1966 | 5 September 1967 | 56 days | 10 years, 168 days | Became permanent | |
| V. S. Deshpande | Bombay | 11 June 1967 | 19 Nov 1980 – 11 Jan 1981 | 10 August 1982 | 54 days | 15 years, 61 days | Became permanent | |
| D. P. Madon | Bombay | 25 September 1967 | 11 Aug 1982 – 30 Aug 1982 | 14 March 1983^{[‡]} | 20 days | 15 years, 171 days | Became permanent | |
| M. N. Chandurkar | Bombay | 28 October 1967 | 15 Mar 1983 – 1 Jan 1984 | 13 March 1988 | 293 days | 20 years, 138 days | Became permanent | |
| M. H. Kania | Bombay | 4 November 1969 | 2 Apr 1984 – 7 Apr 1984 | 30 April 1987^{[‡]} | 6 days | 17 years, 178 days | -- | |
| M. H. Kania | Bombay | 4 November 1969 | 22 Oct 1985 – 22 Jun 1986 | 30 April 1987^{[‡]} | 241 days | 17 years, 178 days | Became permanent | |
| Sharadchandra Krishnaprasd Desai | Bombay | 15 April 1970 | 1 May 1987 – 2 Sep 1987 | 26 October 1990 | 125 days | 20 years, 12 days | -- | |
| C. S. Dharmadhikari | Bombay | 13 July 1972 | 3 Sep 1987 – 1 Nov 1987 | 20 November 1989 | 60 days | 17 years, 131 days | -- | |
| Subhash Chhaganlal Pratap | Bombay | 19 September 1977 | 1 Jan 1991 – 6 Jan 1991 | 1 November 1992 | 6 days | 15 years, 44 days | -- | |
| Sujata Manohar | Bombay | 23 January 1978 | 15 Dec 1992 – 8 Jan 1993 | 4 November 1994^{[‡]} | 25 days | 16 years, 289 days | Became permanent | |
| Sujata Manohar | Bombay | 23 January 1978 | 15 Dec 1993 – 14 Jan 1994 | 4 November 1994^{[‡]} | 31 days | 16 years, 289 days | Became permanent | |
| Madhav Laxman Pendse | Bombay | 25 January 1978 | 1 Apr 1995 – 27 Jul 1995 | 25 March 1996^{[RES]} | 118 days | 18 years, 61 days | Elevated as CJ of Karnataka | |
| A. C. Agarwal | Bombay | 21 November 1986 | 9 Dec 1998 – 2 Feb 1999 | 26 August 1999 | 56 days | 12 years, 279 days | -- | |
| Ashok Desai | Uttarakhand | 21 November 1986 | 9 Nov 2000 – 5 Dec 2000 | 31 March 2003^{[RES]} | 27 days | 16 years, 131 days | Became permanent | |
| Manohar Bansiji Ghodeswar | Bombay | 15 November 1988 | 29 Jan 2000 – 13 Feb 2000 | 13 February 2000 | 16 days | 11 years, 91 days | Retired as ACJ | |
| Gulabrao Deorao Patil | Bombay | 30 July 1990 | 14 Dec 2001 – 30 Dec 2001 | 18 March 2003 | 17 days | 12 years, 232 days | -- | |
| A. P. Shah | Bombay | 18 December 1992 | 7 Jun 2004 – 24 Jul 2004 | 12 February 2010 | 48 days | 17 years, 57 days | -- | |
| Vishwanath Gopal Palshikar | Bombay | 20 January 1994 | 28 Oct 2005 – 24 Feb 2006 | 7 January 2007 | 120 days | 12 years, 353 days | -- | |
| Vishwanath Gopal Palshikar | Bombay | 20 January 1994 | 19 Jul 2006 – 2 Oct 2006 | 7 January 2007 | 76 days | 12 years, 353 days | -- | |
| H. L. Gokhale | Bombay | 20 January 1994 | 12 Jan 2007 – 6 Mar 2007 | 28 April 2010^{[‡]} | 54 days | 16 years, 100 days | Elevated as CJ of Allahabad | |
| J. N. Patel | Bombay | 11 March 1996 | 7 Mar 2007 – 30 Mar 2007 | 4 October 2012 | 24 days | 16 years, 208 days | -- | |
| J. N. Patel | Bombay | 11 March 1996 | 18 Dec 2009 – 10 Feb 2010 | 4 October 2012 | 55 days | 16 years, 208 days | -- | |
| J. N. Patel | Bombay | 11 March 1996 | 30 Apr 2010 – 25 Jun 2010 | 4 October 2012 | 57 days | 16 years, 208 days | Elevated as CJ of Calcutta | |
| D. B. Bhosale | Andhra Pradesh | 22 January 2001 | 7 May 2015 – 29 Jul 2016 | 23 October 2018 | 1 year, 84 days | 17 years, 275 days | Elevated as CJ of Allahabad | |
| S. J. Vazifdar | Punjab & Haryana | 22 January 2001 | 15 Dec 2014 – 6 Aug 2016 | 3 May 2018 | 1 year, 236 days | 17 years, 102 days | Became permanent | |
| N. N. Mhatre | Calcutta | 28 March 2001 | 1 Dec 2016 – 19 Sep 2017 | 19 September 2017 | 293 days | 16 years, 176 days | Retired as ACJ | |
| V. K. Tahilramani | Bombay | 26 June 2001 | 9 Sep 2015 – 14 Feb 2016 | 6 September 2019^{[RES]} | 159 days | 18 years, 73 days | -- | |
| V. K. Tahilramani | Bombay | 26 June 2001 | 11 Aug 2016 – 21 Aug 2016 | 6 September 2019^{[RES]} | 11 days | 18 years, 73 days | -- | |
| V. K. Tahilramani | Bombay | 26 June 2001 | 5 Dec 2017 – 11 Aug 2018 | 6 September 2019^{[RES]} | 250 days | 18 years, 73 days | Elevated as CJ of Madras | |
| N. H. Patil | Bombay | 12 October 2001 | 12 Aug 2018 – 28 Oct 2018 | 6 April 2019 | 78 days | 17 years, 177 days | Became permanent | |
| B. P. Dharmadhikari | Bombay | 15 March 2004 | 24 Feb 2020 – 19 Mar 2020 | 27 April 2020 | 25 days | 16 years, 44 days | Became permanent | |
| S. V. Gangapurwala | Bombay | 13 March 2010 | 12 Dec 2022 – 27 May 2023 | 23 May 2024 | 167 days | 14 years, 72 days | Elevated as CJ of Madras | |
| N. M. Jamdar | Bombay | 23 January 2012 | 31 May 2023 – 28 Jul 2023 | 9 January 2026 | 59 days | 13 years, 352 days | -- | |
| R. V. Ghuge | Bombay | 21 June 2013 | 2 Jun 2026 – 8 Sep 2026 | Incumbent | 99 days | 13 years, 140 days | Elevated as CJ of Calcutta | |
| N. W. Sambre | Delhi | 6 January 2014 | 6 Oct 2026 – Incumbent | Incumbent | 33 days | 12 years, 306 days | | |

== Judges elevated to Supreme Court ==
This section includes the list of only those judges whose parent high court was Bombay. This includes those judges who, at the time of elevation to Supreme Court of India, may not be serving in Bombay High Court but this list does not include judges who at the time of elevation were serving in Bombay High Court but does not have Bombay as their Parent High Court.

Colour Key

- Female Judge
- Served as Chief Justice of India

Key

- ^{RES} Resigned
- ^{†} Died in office

| # | Name of the Judge | Image | Date of Appointment | | Date of Retirement | Tenure | | | Immediately preceding office |
| # | Name of the Judge | Image | In Parent High Court | In Supreme Court | Date of Retirement | In High Court(s) | In Supreme Court | Total tenure (Note: Includes both tenure as High Court Judge as well as Supreme Court Judge) | Immediately preceding office |
|---|---|---|---|---|---|---|---|---|---|
| 1 | Harilal Jekisundas Kania | | 19 June 1933 | 20 June 1946 (Note: Elevated to the Federal Court of India on 20 June 1946, and became part of the Supreme Court of India after its establishment on 26 January 1950.) | 6 November 1951^{[†]} | 13 years, 1 day | 5 years, 140 days | 18 years, 141 days | Judge of Bombay HC |
| 2 | Natwarlal Harilal Bhagwati | | August 1944 | 8 September 1952 | 6 June 1959 | | 6 years, 272 days | | Judge of Bombay HC |
| 3 | Pralhad Balacharya Gajendragadkar | | 6 March 1945 | 17 January 1957 | 15 March 1966 | 11 years, 317 days | 9 years, 58 days | 21 years, 10 days | Judge of Bombay HC |
| 4 | Jayantilal Chhotalal Shah | | 1 March 1949 | 12 October 1959 | 21 January 1971 | 10 years, 225 days | 11 years, 102 days | 21 years, 327 days | Judge of Bombay HC |
| 5 | Jaishanker Manilal Shelat | | 6 January 1957 | 24 February 1966 | 30 April 1973^{[RES]} | 9 years, 49 days | 7 years, 66 days | 16 years, 115 days | 3rd CJ of Gujarat HC |
| 6 | Devidas Ganpat Palekar | | 14 October 1961 | 19 July 1971 | 3 September 1974 | 9 years, 278 days | 3 years, 47 days | 12 years, 325 days | Judge of Bombay HC |
| 7 | Yeshwant Vishnu Chandrachud | | 19 March 1961 | 28 August 1972 | 11 July 1985 | 11 years, 162 days | 12 years, 318 days | 24 years, 115 days | Judge of Bombay HC |
| 8 | Vidyaranya Dattatreya Tulzapurkar | | 21 December 1963 | 30 September 1977 | 9 March 1986 | 13 years, 283 days | 8 years, 161 days | 22 years, 79 days | Judge of Bombay HC |
| 9 | Dinshah Pirosha Madon | | 25 September 1967 | 15 March 1983 | 6 April 1986 | 15 years, 171 days | 3 years, 23 days | 18 years, 194 days | 21st CJ of Bombay HC |
| 10 | Madhukar Hiralal Kania | | 4 November 1969 | 1 May 1987 | 17 November 1992 | 17 years, 178 days | 5 years, 201 days | 23 years, 14 days | 24th CJ of Bombay HC |
| 11 | Parshuram Babaram Sawant | | 29 March 1973 | 6 October 1989 | 29 June 1995 | 16 years, 191 days | 5 years, 267 days | 22 years, 93 days | Judge of Bombay HC |
| 12 | Sam Piroj Bharucha | | 19 September 1977 | 1 July 1992 | 5 May 2002 | 14 years, 286 days | 9 years, 309 days | 24 years, 229 days | 13th CJ of Karnataka HC |
| 13 | Sujata Manohar | | 23 January 1978 | 8 November 1994 | 27 August 1999 | 16 years, 289 days | 4 years, 293 days | 21 years, 217 days | 14th CJ of Kerala HC |
| 14 | Sudhakar Panditrao Kurdukar | | 25 April 1978 | 29 March 1996 | 15 January 2000 | 17 years, 339 days | 3 years, 293 days | 21 years, 266 days | 22nd CJ of Punjab & Haryana HC |
| 15 | Sam Nariman Variava | | 21 November 1986 | 15 March 2000 | 7 November 2005 | 13 years, 115 days | 5 years, 238 days | 18 years, 352 days | 19th CJ of Delhi HC |
| 16 | Bellur Narayanswamy Srikrishna | | 30 July 1990 | 3 October 2002 | 20 May 2006 | 12 years, 65 days | 3 years, 230 days | 15 years, 295 days | 21st CJ of Kerala HC |
| 17 | Sarosh Homi Kapadia | | 8 October 1991 | 18 December 2003 | 28 September 2012 | 12 years, 71 days | 8 years, 286 days | 20 years, 357 days | 2nd CJ of Uttarakhand HC |
| 18 | Vikas Sridhar Sirpurkar | | 9 November 1992 | 12 January 2007 | 21 August 2011 | 14 years, 64 days | 4 years, 228 days | 18 years, 286 days | 32nd CJ of Calcutta HC |
| 19 | Hemant Laxman Gokhale | | 20 January 1994 | 30 April 2010 | 10 March 2014 | 16 years, 100 days | 3 years, 315 days | 20 years, 50 days | 35th CJ of Madras HC |
| 20 | Ranjana Prakash Desai | | 15 April 1996 | 13 September 2011 | 29 October 2014 | 15 years, 151 days | 3 years, 47 days | 18 years, 198 days | Judge of Bombay HC |
| 21 | Sharad Arvind Bobde | | 29 March 2000 | 12 April 2013 | 23 April 2021 | 13 years, 14 days | 8 years, 12 days | 21 years, 26 days | 21st CJ of Madhya Pradesh HC |
| 22 | Ajay Manikrao Khanwilkar | | 29 March 2000 | 13 May 2016 | 29 July 2022 | 16 years, 45 days | 6 years, 78 days | 22 years, 123 days | 22nd CJ of Madhya Pradesh HC |
| 23 | Dhananjaya Yeshwant Chandrachud | | 29 March 2000 | 13 May 2016 | 10 November 2024 | 16 years, 45 days | 8 years, 182 days | 24 years, 227 days | 44th CJ of Allahabad HC |
| 24 | Bhushan Ramkrishna Gavai | | 14 November 2003 | 24 May 2019 | 23 November 2025 | 15 years, 191 days | 6 years, 184 days | 22 years, 10 days | Judge of Bombay HC |
| 25 | Abhay Shreeniwas Oka | | 29 August 2003 | 31 August 2021 | 24 May 2025 | 18 years, 2 days | 3 years, 267 days | 21 years, 269 days | 30th CJ of Karnataka HC |
| 26 | Prasanna Bhalachandra Varale | | 18 July 2008 | 25 January 2024 | Incumbent | 15 years, 190 days | 2 years, 287 days | 18 years, 113 days | 32nd CJ of Karnataka HC |
| 27 | Atul Sharachchandra Chandurkar | | 21 June 2013 | 30 May 2025 | Incumbent | 11 years, 342 days | 1 year, 162 days | 13 years, 140 days | Judge of Bombay HC |

== Case information ==
The Case Status and Causelists of Bombay High Court is available on its official website at www.bombayhighcourt.nic.in. The orders and judgments from the year 2005 are also available on the website.

As of March 2012 the High Court has 315,988 civil cases and 45,960 criminal cases pending. At the same time, the District and subordinate courts under the Bombay High Court have a total of 3,179,475 pending cases.

== See also ==
- High courts of India
- List of chief justices of the Bombay High Court
- List of chief justices of the Supreme Court of Bombay
