= Herbert Compton =

Herbert Compton may refer to:

- Herbert Eastwick Compton (1853–1906), English novelist, biographer, and world traveller
- Herbert Abingdon Draper Compton (1770–1846), British India judge
