= Chainani =

Chainani is a surname. Notable people with the surname include:

- Hashmatrai Khubchand Chainani (1904–1965), Indian judge
- Soman Chainani, American author and filmmaker
