= Anil Dave =

Anil Dave may refer to:

- Anil Madhav Dave (1956–2017), Indian environmentalist and politician
- Anil R. Dave (born 1951), Indian judge
