= David Pollock (judge) =

Sir David Pollock (2 September 1780 – 22 May 1847) was a British barrister, and at the end of his life a judge in India.

== Life ==
Born in London, David Pollock was the eldest son of David Pollock, a saddler of Charing Cross, and his wife Sarah Homera Parsons, daughter of Richard Parsons of London, receiver-general of customs. He was of Scottish extraction, his grandfather, John Pollock, having been a native of Tweedmouth. Field-Marshal Sir George Pollock and Sir Jonathan Frederick Pollock, Lord Chief Baron of the Exchequer, were his brothers.

Pollock was educated at St Paul's School and the University of Edinburgh, but did not graduate. On 28 January 1803 he was called to the bar at the Middle Temple. Pollock practised as a special pleader on the Home Circuit, at the Kent sessions, and in the insolvent debtors' court. He took silk in 1833, was appointed Recorder of Maidstone in 1838, and commissioner of the insolvent debtors' court in 1842.

By patent of 2 September 1846 Pollock was created a knight on succeeding Sir Henry Roper as Chief Justice of the Supreme Court of Bombay, where he was sworn in on 3 November 1847. He died of a liver complaint on 22 May 1847. His remains were interred in Bombay Cathedral.

== Family ==
Pollock married, on 12 December 1807, Elizabeth Gore, daughter of John Atkinson, by whom he had seven sons and a daughter. Elizabeth Pollock died on 16 April 1841.
