= Jai Narayan Patel =

Indian judge (born 1950)

Jai Narayan Patel or J. N Patel (born 5 October 1950) is a retired Indian judge and former Chief Justice of the Calcutta High Court.

== Career ==
Patel was born in 1950. He was enrolled as an Advocate on 27 August 1974 and started practice on Civil, Criminal and Constitutional matters in the District Courts and the High Court at Nagpur Bench. Patel also served as a teacher in University College of Law. On 20 April 1987, he was appointed a Judge of the City Civil Court. He was appointed Designated Judge in TADA Court, the Special Court constituted for the trial of 1993 Bombay bombings case. He became the Additional Judge of the Bombay High Court on 11 March 1996 and permanent Judge on 7 January 1997. Being the senior most judge he served as acting Chief Justice of Bombay High court after Chief Justice Anil Dave was elevated as judge of the Supreme Court of India. In 2010 Justice Patel became the Chief Justice of Calcutta High Court and retired on 5 October 2012. After retirement he became the head of the Judicial Commission of 2018 Bhima Koregaon violence.
