= Nitin Wasudeo Sambre =

Indian judge (born 1967)

Hon'ble Justice Nitin Wasudeo Sambre

Judge of Delhi High Court
- Incumbent
- Assumed office 21 July 2025
- Nominated by: B. R. Gavai
- Appointed by: Droupadi Murmu
- Acting Chief Justice
- Assumed office 6 October 2026
- Appointed by: Droupadi Murmu
- Preceded by: D. K. Upadhyaya
- Succeeded by: P. Sam Koshy

Judge of Bombay High Court
- In office 6 January 2014 – 20 July 2025
- Nominated by: P. Sathasivam
- Appointed by: Pranab Mukherjee

Personal details
- Born: 19 December 1967 (age 58) Nagpur, Maharashtra
- Parent: Justice Wasudeo M. Sambre
- Education: Shivaji Science College (B.Com), Nagpur University (LL.B)

Nitin Wasudeo Sambre (born 19 December 1967) is an Indian jurist, who is currently serving as acting chief justice of Delhi High Court. He previously served as a judge of the Bombay High Court.

== Education and career ==
Sambre was born on 19 December 1967 at Nagpur, Maharashtra. His father Wasudeo Mahadeorao Sambre was judge of Bombay High Court. He completed his schooling at Somalwar High School. He obtained his Bachelor of Commerce degree from Shivaji Science College, Nagpur and subsequently pursued his legal education at the University College of Law, Nagpur, graduating in Law in 1992. During his student years, he was actively associated with university life and served as President of the Students' Union of the University College of Law, Nagpur, in 1991. He was also a sportsman and represented the State of Maharashtra in national tournaments.

Sambre enrolled as an Advocate on 25 August 1992. He began his legal career in the chambers of Shri Sharad A. Bobde, who later became Chief Justice of India. Sambre started practising on his own before the Bombay High Court, particularly at its Nagpur Bench, where he appeared on the civil, writ and criminal sides. He served as Secretary of the High Court Bar Association, Nagpur, from 2004 to 2007. He represented the Governor of Maharashtra before the Nagpur Bench of the Bombay High Court and was appointed Government Pleader and Public Prosecutor on 1 September 2007. In this capacity, he handled matters involving the State Government and its departments. He also served as counsel for the Nagpur Improvement Trust, special counsel for the Maharashtra Forest Department and the Scheduled Tribes Caste Certificate Verification Committee.

He represented a number of statutory bodies as standing counsel. Notable assignments includes Bharat Petroleum Corporation Limited, Indian Oil Corporation Limited and Bharat Heavy Electricals Limited. He also represented various Municipal Corporations and Municipal Councils, as well as private corporate entities including Tata Sons and Godrej.

== Judicial career ==
Sambre was elevated as an Additional Judge of the Bombay High Court on 6 January 2014 and became permanent on 2 March 2016. During his tenure at the Bombay High Court, he served principally at the Nagpur Bench. His judicial responsibilities included serving as Chairman of the Bombay High Court Legal Services Sub-Committee at the Nagpur Bench. He was also associated with the administration of legal education and judicial institutions, serving as a member of the Governing Council of the State Judicial Academy and as Chairman of the Executive Council of Maharashtra National Law University, Nagpur. He was also associated with the Judicial Officers' Welfare Committee.

On 21 July 2025, Justice Nitin Wasudeo Sambre assumed charge as a judge of the Delhi High Court. On 6 October 2026, he was appointed as acting chief justice of Delhi High Court following elevation of the chief justice Devendra Kumar Upadhyaya to Supreme Court of India.
