= Y. S. Tambe =

Yashwant Shripad Tambe (born 31 July 1904, date of death unknown) became Chief Justice of the Bombay High Court on 5 February 1966 and served until 31 July 1966.

He was the first Nagpur Judge to become the Chief Justice of Bombay. He was born at Amravati and educated at Indore, Government Law College Bombay. He practised at the Bar at Nagpur from 1930 through 1934. He became Judge of Nagpur High Court on 8 February 1954 and moved to Mumbai in 1966 as Chief Justice after Hashmatrai Khubchand Chainani.

Legal offices
Preceded by Hashmatrai Khubchand Chainani	Chief Justice of the Bombay High Court; 1965-1966	Succeeded by S. P. Kotval
