= Michael Roberts Westropp =

Irish-born British Indian judge (1817-1890)

Sir Michael Roberts Westropp

3rd Chief Justice of Bombay High Court
- In office 1 April 1870 – 8 August 1882
- Appointed by: Queen Victoria
- Preceded by: Rcihard Couch
- Succeeded by: Charles Sargent

Judge of Bombay High Court
- In office 1863 – 31 March 1870
- Appointed by: Queen Victoria

Member of Bombay Legislative Council
- In office 1862–1863
- Governor: Henry Bartle Frere

Advocate-General of Bombay
- In office 1856–1857
- Appointed by: Queen Victoria
- Preceded by: Augustus Smith LeMesurier
- In office 1861–1862
- Appointed by: Queen Victoria
- Succeeded by: Arthur James Lewis

Personal details
- Born: 29 June 1817 Ireland
- Died: 14 January 1890 (aged 72)
- Parent(s): Henry Bruen Wsetropp (father); Maria Wallis Armstrong (mother)
- Education: Trinity College, Dublin
- Occupation: Lawyer, Judge
- Profession: Chief Justice

Sir Michael Roberts Westropp (29 June 1817 – 14 January 1890) was an Irish-born British Indian Chief Justice of the Bombay High Court and former Advocate General of the Supreme Court, Bombay Presidency.

== Early life ==
Westropp was born in 1817 in Ireland. He was the son of Henry Bruen Westropp, of the 7th Dragoon Guards and a magistrate of Cork, and Maria Wallis Armstrong. In 1838 he graduated from Trinity College Dublin, and became a barrister in 1840.

== Career ==
He practiced law for more than 15 years in Dublin and then joined as a counsel in the Bombay Supreme Court and the Bombay High Court. He also served as Member of the Bombay Legislative Council in 1862-63. In 1856, Westropp became the Advocate-General of Bombay. He became puisne judge of the Bombay High Court in 1863 and served as such till 1870 when After Sir Richard Couch he held the office of Chief Justice of Bombay in 1870, and was knighted by letters patent. He was known for the judgments in Nawroji v. Rogers and Lopes v. Lopes. Westropp retired from service due to illness.
