= B. N. Deshmukh =

Indian judge and politician (1935–2020)

B. N. Deshmukh (19 January 1935 ― 28 May 2020) was an Indian judge and former acting Chief Justice of the Bombay High Court.

== Career ==
B. N. Deshmukh was born as Balbhimarao Narsingrao Deshmukh in 1935. He studied International Law in England and started practice in the Bombay High Court in 1963. He was a Member as well as Chairman of the Maharashtra State Bar Council. Deshmukh was also a member of the upper house of the Maharashtra Legislative Council during 1972–1976 on behalf of Peasants and Workers Party of India. He was appointed Additional Judge of the Aurangabad bench of Bombay High Court on 21 November 1986 serving there for 11 years (1986 to 1997). He became a permanent Judge of the High Court in 1987. Deshmukh worked as acting Chief Justice of the said High Court in different times. He was popularly known for giving judgement on the common man's interests.
