= Leonard Stone (judge) =

12th Chief Justice of the Bombay High Court

Sir John Leonard Stone QC, OBE

12th Chief justice of Bombay High Court
- In office 30 September 1943 – 3 January 1948
- Appointed by: George VI
- Preceded by: John William Fisher Beaumont
- Succeeded by: M. C. Chagla

Personal details
- Born: 6 November 1896
- Died: 3 January 1978 (aged 81)
- Education: Malvern College

Sir John Leonard Stone, OBE, QC (6 November 1896 – 3 January 1978) was a British jurist who served as the last British Chief Justice of the Bombay High Court. He assumed office on 30 September 1943 and served during the historic period of India's independence until 1948.

== Education and career ==
Stone received his early education at Malvern College in England. He served in the First World War and in the Greco-Turkish War of 1919–1922. He later held administrative appointments in the Near East.

He was called to the bar at Gray's Inn in 1923, he joined the Lincoln's Inn Bar in 1931, becoming a Bencher of Gray's Inn in 1942 and its treasurer in 1956. He served in the British Home Guard during the Second World War, until 1943, when he was appointed Chief Justice of the Bombay High Court. He was appointed an OBE in the 1943 New Year Honours (citing his Home Guard service) and knighted in the 1943 Birthday Honours. He was appointed a King's Counsel in 1948. He resigned from Bombay High Court on 3 January 1948.

He subsequently served as Vice-Chancellor of the County Palatine of Lancaster from 1948 to 1963.

== Arms ==
Coat of arms of Leonard Stone

Notes
Displayed on a painted panel in the hall at Gray's Inn.
Crest
Between two wings Sable each charged with a fleur de lis between two cinquefoils in chief and in base Or a griffin’s head per pale Argent and Or.
Escutcheon
Per pale Argent and Or three cinquefoils Sable on a chief indented Azure a mullet of six points between two mullets Argent.
Motto
Sto Ne Per Vim Sed Per Jus

== See also ==
- List of chief justices of the Bombay High Court
