= Amberson Barrington Marten =

10th Chief Justice of the Bombay High Court

Sir Amberson Barrington Marten

10th Chief justice of Bombay High Court
- In office 7 June 1926 – 17 June 1930
- Appointed by: George V
- Preceded by: Norman Cranstoun Macleod
- Succeeded by: John William Fisher Beaumont

Judge of Bombay High Court
- In office 1916 – 6 June 1926
- Appointed by: George V

Personal details
- Born: 1870
- Died: 1962 (aged 91–92)
- Parent: Alfred Marten (father)
- Education: M.A. and LL.D

Sir Amberson Barrington Marten (1870–1962) was the 10th Chief Justice of the Bombay High Court in British India.

== Career ==
Amberson Barrington Marten, known by his middle name, was the elder son of Sir Alfred Marten. He passed M.A. and LL.D. and started practice in the Law Courts in England and in 1916 he came to Bombay in British India to fill the vacancy created by the death of Sir Dinshaw Davar. He was appointed Puisne Judge from 1916 to 1926.

Barrington Marten had knowledge of English law, both principles and case laws. On 7 June 1926, he was elevated as the Chief Justice of The Bombay High Court after Sir Norman Cranstoun Macleod.

Barrington Marten was knighted in 1924 and resigned from Bombay High Court on 17 June 1930.
