= Mahesh Chandra Tripathi =

50th Chief Justice of Bombay High Court

The Honourable Chief Justice Mahesh Chandra Tripathi

50th Chief Justice of Bombay High Court
- Incumbent
- Assumed office 9 September 2026
- Nominated by: Surya Kant
- Appointed by: Droupadi Murmu
- Preceded by: Shree Chandrashekhar; R. V. Ghuge (acting)

Judge of Allahabad High Court
- In office 27 September 2013 – 8 September 2026
- Nominated by: P. Sathasivam
- Appointed by: Pranab Mukherjee

Personal details
- Born: 21 June 1966 (age 60)
- Education: Lucknow University (LL.B)

Mahesh Chandra Tripathi (born 21 June 1966) is an Indian judge, who is currently serving as the Chief Justice of Bombay High Court since 9 September 2026. He is former judge of the Allahabad High Court in the state of Uttar Pradesh.

== Life ==
Tripathi was born on 21 June 1966, he earned his law degree from Lucknow University in 1990 and enrolled as an advocate on 11 January 1992, establishing a successful practice in civil and constitutional law. Before his elevation, he served as Additional Chief Standing Counsel for Uttar Pradesh and was the counsel for Kanpur Nagar Nigam, Kanpur Development Authority, Agra Development Authority, Uttar Pradesh Food and Essential Commodities Corporation Limited (UPSFECC), Moradabad Development Authority and Kumaun University.

Elevated as an Additional Judge of the Allahabad High Court on 27 September 2013, he became a permanent judge on 10 April 2015.

On 6 August 2026, the Supreme Court collegium recommended his appointment as Chief Justice of the Bombay High Court and government cleared his appointment on 5 September 2026. He was administered oath of office by Jishnu Dev Varma, Governor of Maharashtra on 9 September 2026.
