= B. P. Dharmadhikari =

Former Chief Justice of Bombay High Court

Hon'ble Chief Justice (Retd.) B. P. Dharmadhikari

Chief Justice of Bombay High Court
- In office 20 March 2020 – 27 April 2020
- Nominated by: Sharad Arvind Bobde
- Appointed by: Ram Nath Kovind
- Succeeded by: Dipankar Datta

Acting Chief Justice of Bombay High Court
- In office 24 February 2020 – 19 March 2020
- Appointed by: Ram Nath Kovind

Judge of Bombay High Court
- In office 15 March 2004 – 23 February 2020
- Nominated by: V. N. Khare
- Appointed by: A. P. J. Abdul Kalam

Personal details
- Born: 28 April 1958 (age 68) Nagpur
- Education: Nagpur University

Bhushan Pradyumna Dharmadhikari (born 28 April 1958) is an Indian Judge. He is former Chief Justice of Bombay High Court. He has also served as Acting Chief Justice of Bombay High Court and Judge of Bombay High Court also.

== Career ==
He practised law in Nagpur after enrolment in Bar Council of Maharashtra on 17 October 1980. He became standing counsel for many Government Corporations. He was elevated as Additional Judge of Bombay High Court on 15 March 2004. After this he was elevated as Permanent Judge on 12 March 2006.

On 24 February 2020, He was appointed Acting Chief Justice of Bombay High Court after the retirement of Chief Justice of the High court Pradeep Nandrajog.

On 24 February 2020, he was appointed Acting Chief Justice of Bombay High Court. He was appointed Chief Justice of Bombay High Court on 20 March 2020. He retired on 27 April 2020.
