= K. K. Desai =

Indian judge

K. K. Desai was an Indian judge who served as the 17th Chief Justice of Bombay High Court.

== Personal life ==
He was born in Bombay on 27 October 1910 and studied in Gurukul Residential School, Bharuch and got Degree of LLB from Government Law College of Bombay.
