= Mohit Shantilal Shah =

Former Chief Justice of Bombay High Court

Judge of Gujarat High Court
- In office 18 September 1995 – December 2009

Chief Justice of the Calcutta High Court
- In office December 2009 – June 2010

39th Chief Justice of the Bombay High Court
- In office 26 June 2010 – 9 September 2015

Personal details
- Born: 9 September 1953 (age 72) Vijapur, Gujarat

Mohit Shantilal Shah (born 9 September 1953) is a retired Indian judge and a former chief justice of two high courts of India. He was Chief Justice of the Bombay High Court from June 2010 till September 2015. He previously worked as Chief Justice of Calcutta High Court from December 2009 to June 2010. In 2017, it was alleged by some family members of a deceased CBI judge that during his Chief Justiceship at Mumbai, Shah had made an offer of ₹100 crore to the judge Brijgopal Harkishan Loya who was then presiding over the Sohrabuddin Sheikh Encounter Case.

== Early life ==
Shah was born in Vijapur city of Gujarat. His initial education happened at Baroda, Surat and Amreli. Later, he obtained his Bachelor of Arts in political science from the Maharaja Sayajirao University of Baroda. Shah was adjudged a gold medallist for his performance in his Law course examination in 1976.

== Career ==
He was appointed a judge of the Gujarat High Court in 1995. He then worked as Chief Justice of Calcutta High Court from December 2009 to June 2010. He retired in 2015.
