= Devendra Kumar Upadhyaya =

Judge of Supreme Court of India

Hon'ble Justice Devendra Kumar Upadhyaya

Judge of Supreme Court of India
- Incumbent
- Assumed office 6 October 2026
- Nominated by: Surya Kant
- Appointed by: Droupadi Murmu

34th Chief Justice of Delhi High Court
- In office 21 January 2025 – 5 October 2026
- Nominated by: Sanjiv Khanna
- Appointed by: Droupadi Murmu
- Preceded by: Manmohan; Vibhu Bakhru (acting)
- Succeeded by: P. Sam Koshy; N. W. Sambre (acting)

47th Chief Justice of Bombay High Court
- In office 29 July 2023 – 20 January 2025
- Nominated by: D. Y. Chandrachud
- Appointed by: Droupadi Murmu
- Preceded by: R. D. Dhanuka; N. M. Jamdar (acting)
- Succeeded by: Alok Aradhe

Judge of Allahabad High Court
- In office 21 November 2011 – 28 July 2023
- Nominated by: S. H. Kapadia
- Appointed by: Pratibha Patil

Personal details
- Born: 16 June 1965 (age 61) Muskarai, Ambedkar Nagar, Uttar Pradesh
- Education: Lucknow University (LL.B)

Devendra Kumar Upadhyaya (born 16 June 1965) is a judge of the Supreme Court of India. He has served as Chief Justice of Delhi High Court and Bombay High Court. He is former Judge of Allahabad High Court.

== Early life ==
Upadhyaya was born on 16 June 1965 at Muskarai Village of Ambedkar Nagar District, Uttar Pradesh, He completed his college education at Colvin Taluqdars’ College, Lucknow. He pursued his legal education at Lucknow University and graduated in Law in 1991. He enrolled as an Advocate on 11 May 1991.

== Career ==
After entering the legal profession, he practised primarily on the civil and constitutional sides at the Lucknow Bench of the Allahabad High Court. He joined the chambers of his father, Shri R.A. Upadhyaya, who had a long-standing practice before the Board of Revenue, as well as of the Senior Advocates Mohd. Arif Khan and S.K. Kalia.

In May 2007, he was appointed Chief Standing Counsel for the State of Uttar Pradesh. He continued in that position until his elevation to the Bench. His experience as the State's principal law officer at the Lucknow Bench provided him with substantial experience in constitutional and public-law litigation and in dealing with matters concerning the State Government.

He was appointed an Additional Judge of the Allahabad High Court on 21 November 2011 and subsequently made permanent and took oath on 6 August 2013. For more than a decade, he served at the Lucknow Bench of the Allahabad High Court, where he handled a wide range of civil and constitutional matters. On 28 March 2023, he became the Senior Judge of the Lucknow Bench.

He was appointed Chief Justice of the Bombay High Court and took oath of office on 29 July 2023. He became the 47th Chief Justice of that Court and served in that capacity until his transfer to Delhi. On 21 January 2025, Justice Upadhyaya took oath as the Chief Justice of the Delhi High Court. His appointment marked another significant stage in a judicial career that had begun more than three decades earlier at the Lucknow Bar.

On 28 September 2026, Supreme court collegium recommended his appointment as judge of Supreme Court of India. He became the 2nd judge from Lucknow bench of the Allahabad High Court to get elevated to Supreme Court after Justice Brijesh Kumar was elevated in 2000. On 5 October 2026, Justice Devendra Kumar Upadhyaya was appointed a Judge of the Supreme Court of India along with Justices Sunita Agarwal and Aparesh Kumar Singh. His elevation to the country's highest court marks the culmination of a judicial career spanning the Allahabad, Bombay and Delhi High Courts.

He was appointed on 5 October 2026 and took oath as judge of the Supreme Court of India on 6 October 2026.

== Role in Yashwant Verma case ==
As Chief Justice of Delhi High Court, Upadhyaya initiated preliminary inquiry against Yashwant Varma, then sitting judge of Delhi High Court, in whose house stack of burned cash found after fire incident. Upadhyaya submitted preliminary inquiry report to the then CJI Sanjiv Khanna, who made it public and also initiated in-house inquiry against Justice Verma.
