= Manoj Kumar Mukherjee =

Indian jurist (1933–2021)

- Born: 1 December 1933; British India
- Died: 17 April 2021 (aged 87); Kolkata
- Occupation: Judge
- Notable work: Leading Mukherjee Commission

Manoj Kumar Mukherjee (1 December 1933 – 17 April 2021) was an Indian jurist. He served as the Chief Justices of the Bombay High Court and Allahabad High Court and former judge of the Supreme Court of India. He was the head of Mukherjee Commission, formed to probe the death of Subash Chandra Bose.

== Personal life ==
He is related to Mohan Kumaramangalam, a lawyer, parliamentarian, and Union Minister, as well as Ajoy Mukherjee, the three-time Chief Minister of West Bengal. His nephew, Muktesh Mukherjee, a Canadian mining executive and grandson of Mohan Kumaramangalam, was among the passengers on Malaysia Airlines Flight MH370 along with his wife Xiaomo Bai, which disappeared on 8 March 2014.His brother was the JSW Director Malay Mukherjee and another brother, Milon Mukherjee is a Senior Advocate at the Calcutta High Court.

== Career ==
Mukherjee was born in 1933 in British India. He did his schooling in East Indian Railway School in Asansol. He passed B.Sc. and LL.B thereafter started his lawyer career in Asansol Court, in the state of West Bengal in 1956. He worked in the Calcutta High Court as a criminal law expert since December 1962 and in 1977 he was appointed a Judge of this Court. He was transferred to the Allahabad High Court on 12 November 1991 as the Chief Justice. In January 1993 Mukherjee became the Chief Justice Bombay High Court. He was also appointed a Judge of the Supreme Court in 1993.

In 1999, after retirement, Mukherjee was appointed the chairperson of Mukherjee Commission to inquire into the death of Subhas Chandra Bose. His name was recommended by the then Chief Justice of India.
