= John Henry Newbolt =

British politician

Sir John Henry Newbolt (1769 - 22 January 1823) was an English judge who served as Chief Justice of Madras and was founder of the Madras Literary Society. He was Member of Parliament for Bramber for 1800–02.

== Biography ==
Born at Winchester, John was the first son of Reverend John Monk Newbolt and his wife Susanna. He studied at Winchester and at Christ Church, Oxford, graduating in 1791. He studied law at All Souls College, Oxford and was called to the bar at Lincoln's Inn in 1795.

He worked for a while at the Chancery as a Secretary and then as a Commissioner of Bankruptcy (1796-1811). In 1794 he married Elizabeth Juliana Digby, daughter of the Dean of Durham, and they had three sons and a daughter. In 1800 he obtained with the help of Lord Canning, a fellow alumnus of Christ Church, a Parliamentary seat at Bramber which he held until 1802.

In 1809, his wife died and he obtained a posting in India in 1810 as a puisne judge in Madras through the influence of Canning. He married Henrietta Blenkinsop in 1810 in Madras and they had one son and two daughters. He was knighted on 17 April 1810 and made Recorder of Bombay for 1811–12. In 1815 he succeeded Thomas Andrew Lumisden Strange as Chief Justice of Madras and in 1817 he founded the Madras Literary Society.

He resigned from his position as Chief Justice on 31 August 1820 and hoped to retire to a cottage on the Isle of Wight, but died suddenly at his home at Portswood Lodge, Southampton on 22 January 1823. He was buried at South Stoneham near Southampton, where a monument was erected in his memory.
