= Dinshah Pirosha Madon =

Indian judge (born 1921)

Dinshah Pirosha Madon (7 April 1921 – 24 June 1994) was an Indian judge who served on the Supreme Court of India.

== Life and career ==
Madan was born on 7 April 1921. He studied at Imperial High School, Bombay, Sardar Dastur Noshirwan High School of Poona, and Elphinstone College. He passed LL.B. from the Government Law College, Mumbai. Madon was enrolled as an Advocate on 21 November 1944 and started practice on the Original Side of the Bombay High Court and Supreme Court of India. He worked on Civil, Constitutional, Taxation and Criminal matters. Madon also pleaded in foreign courts, such as the East African Court of Appeal at Nairobi and in the Supreme Court of Aden. From 1952 to 1955 he served as part-time Professor of Law, Government Law College of Bombay. On 25 September 1967, Madon was appointed Additional Judge of the Bombay High Court and his appointment was made permanent on 6 August 1969. He was the head of the Commission of Inquiry into the 1970 Bhiwandi riots. He became the Chief Justice of Bombay High Court on 11 August 1982 after Justice Venkat Shrinivas Deshpande. Justice Madon was elevated in the post of Judge of the Supreme Court of India on 15 March 1983 and retired on 7 April 1986.

Madan died on 24 June 1994.
