= Venkat Shrinivas Deshpande =

Indian judge

Venkat Shrinivas Deshpande (11 August 1920 – 4 February 2013) was an Indian judge and former Chief Justice of the Bombay High Court.

== Career ==
Deshpande was born in 1920. He passed LL.B. from University College of Law, under Osmania University. At first he was a practitioner of Hyderabad High Court but in 1957 he started practice in the Bombay High Court on Civil and Criminal matters. Deshpande became an Assistant Government Pleader in March 1961 and was appointed a judge of the Bombay High Court on 11 June 1967. He worked as acting Chief Justice in 1980 and thereafter was permanently elevated as the Chief Justice of Bombay High Court on 12 January 1981 after Justice B. N. Deshmukh. After retirement Deshpande also worked as Maharashtra Lokayukta till 26 September 1989. He died in Pune in February 2013, aged 93. He is survived by a son and three daughters.
