= Hemant Gokhale =

Indian judge (born 1949)

Hemant Laxman Gokhale is a former judge of the Supreme Court of India. He served as chief justice of two high courts of India: Madras High Court and Allahabad High Court.

Born on 10.3.1949 at Baroda. Studied at Bal Mohan Vidya Mandir, Ramnarain Ruia College, Govt. Law College and University of Mumbai at Mumbai. M.A with Economics and Political Science, LL.M. with Constitutional and International Law. Obtained 1st Rank at the LL.M. examination in the University of Mumbai. Enrolled as an Advocate with the Bar Council of Maharashtra, on 20.1.1973, practiced in Civil, Constitutional, Labour and Service Laws and specialized in Industrial and Service matters. Worked as part-time Professor of Law at the Government Law College, Mumbai during 1977-84. Worked as an Assistant Government Pleader to the State of Maharashtra in the Bombay High Court on the Original as well as Appellate Sides during 1984 to 1989. He was appointed as an Additional Judge of the Bombay High Court on 20.1.1994 and immediately on appointment transferred to the Gujarat High Court on 4.2.1994. He was appointed as a permanent Judge of the Gujarat High Court on 23.1.1995. He was transferred back to the Bombay High Court on 25.2.1999. He became Acting Chief Justice of Bombay High Court on 7.1.2007. He was appointed as Chief Justice of Allahabad High Court on 7.3.2007 and transferred to Madras High Court on 9.3.2009. Elevated to the Supreme Court of India on 30.4.2010.
