= Ashok Chhotelal Agarwal =

Indian judge (1937–2019)

Ashok Chhotelal Agarwal (27 August 1937 – 23 February 2019) was an Indian judge and former Chief Justice of Madras High Court.

== Career ==
Agarwal was born in 1937. He passed B.A., LL.B. from ILS Law College, Pune in 1960 and started practice in lower courts of Bombay, Maharashtra. In 1974 he was appointed Assistant Government Pleader on the Appellate Side of the Bombay High Court. On 21 November 1986, Agarwal was appointed additional judge of the Bombay High Court. He became a permanent judge on 12 June 1987. Justice Agarwal was transferred to the Madras High Court on 24 May 1999 as the Chief Justice and retired from there on 26 August 1999. After the retirement, in October 1999 he became Chairman of the Central Administrative Tribunal (CAT), New Delhi.
