= Chittatosh Mookerjee =

Indian judge

Chittatosh Mookerjee (Born 1 January 1929) was a Chief Justice of the Calcutta and Bombay High Court, in India. He is a grandson of Bengali scholar and educator Ashutosh Mukherjee and nephew of Shyama Prasad Mookerjee.

== Early life ==
Mookerjee was born on 1 January 1929 in Kolkata, British India. His father Rama Prasad Mukherjee was a judge of the Calcutta High Court. He passed Matriculation Examination in the First Division from Mitra Institution, Bhowanipore, got First Class in the Preliminary, Intermediate and Final Law Examinations of the Calcutta University and passed M.A. in Economics in 1951. Mookerjee entered the legal profession in November 1953.

== Career ==
He was appointed an additional judge of the Calcutta High Court in 1969, and in 1970, he became a permanent judge of the High Court. In 1986 he was elevated as the chief justice of the Calcutta High Court and was transferred to Bombay as Chief Justice of the Bombay High Court. Mookerjee retired from judgeship in 1991. He was also the acting Governor of Maharashtra. In 1990, he was the head of the tribunal for the Kaveri River water dispute. After retirement, he became the first chairperson of the West Bengal Human Rights Commission and served there from 1995 to 1998.
