= John William Fisher Beaumont =

11th Chief Justice of the Bombay High Court

Sir John William Fisher Beaumont QC, PC
- Beaumont in 1946

11th Chief justice of Bombay High Court
- In office 20 June 1930 – 29 September 1943
- Appointed by: George V
- Preceded by: Amberson Barrington Marten
- Succeeded by: Leonard Stone

Personal details
- Born: 4 September 1877 St Pancras, London
- Died: 8 February 1974 (aged 96)
- Resting place: Highgate Cemetery
- Parent: Edward Beaumont
- Education: Winchester College and Pembroke College, Cambridge

Sir John William Fisher Beaumont, QC, PC (4 September 1877 – 8 February 1974) was a British barrister and judge who served as 11th Chief Justice of the Bombay High Court.

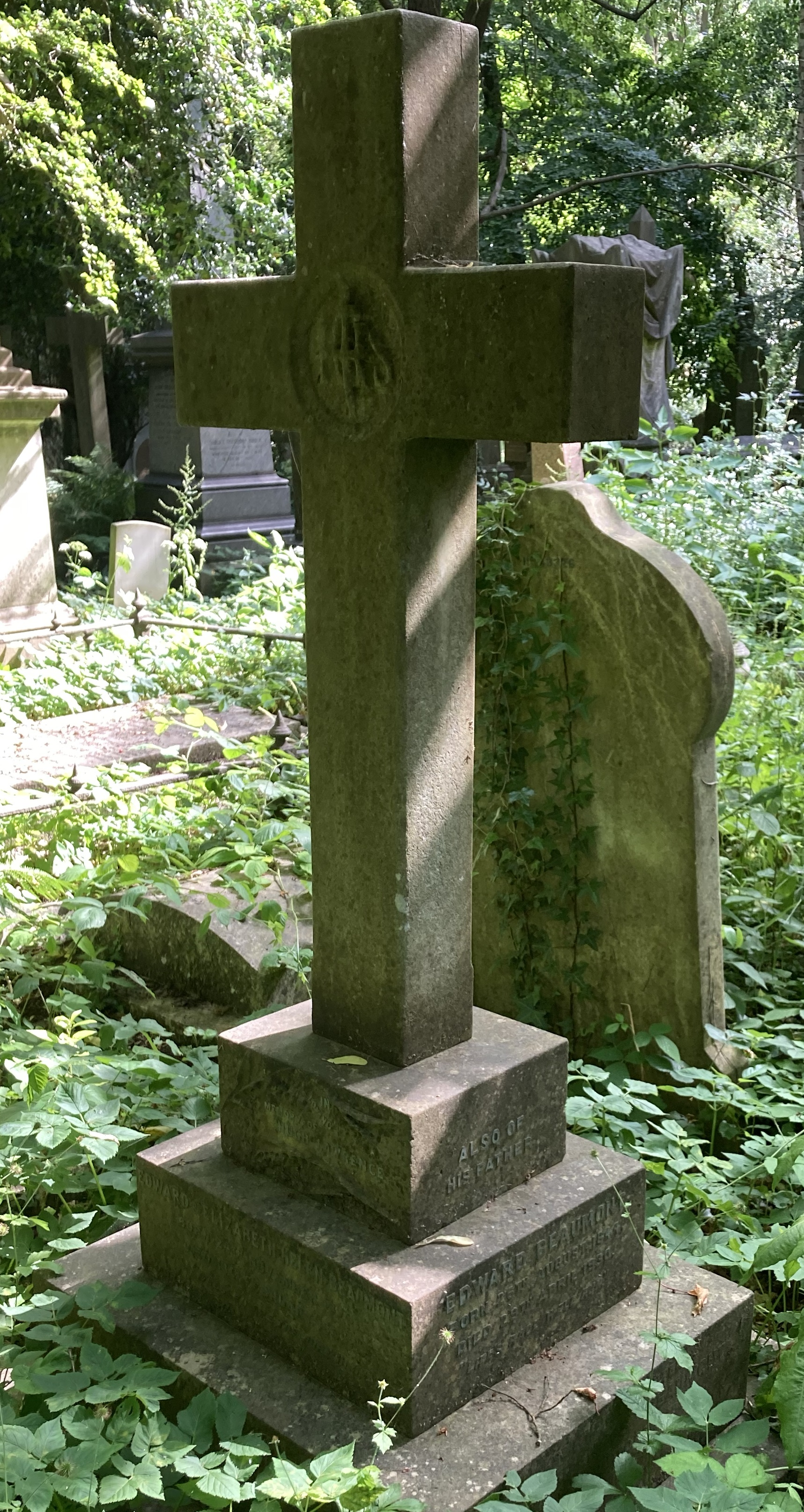
Grave of John William Fisher Beaumont in Highgate Cemetery

== Early life ==
Beaumont was born in St Pancras, London in 1877. His father Edward Beaumont was also Bar-at-law. He received his early education at Winchester College before attending Pembroke College, Cambridge. He graduated with a first-class degree in the History Tripos in 1899 and received a scholarship. In 1901, he was called to the Bar by Lincoln’s Inn, beginning his legal career in England. He subsequently became a King's Counsel (KC) and joined the Bar Council in 1927.

== Career ==
In June 1930, Beaumont succeeded Sir Amberson Barrington Marten as Chief Justice of the Bombay High Court. He held the office for approximately thirteen years, making him the longest-serving Chief Justice in the history of the court. He was knighted in the 1931 New Year Honours.

As a judge, Beaumont was notable for his clear judgments, careful consideration of criminal cases and insistence on judicial independence. He was particularly attentive to procedural irregularities and the protection of individuals against improper executive interference. His judicial work helped sustain the institutional traditions of the Bombay High Court during the final decades of British rule.

During 1942–1943, Beaumont was also called upon to serve temporarily as a judge of the Federal Court of India, the predecessor of the Supreme Court of India. He was subsequently associated with the Judicial Committee of the Privy Council, then the highest appellate authority for many cases from British India.

He left the office of Chief Justice in 1943. He died on 8 February 1974 and was buried on the west side of Highgate Cemetery.
