= High Court of Bombay at Goa =

Permanent bench of the Bombay High Court in Goa

Bombay High Court at Goa
- Jurisdiction: Goa
- Location: Panaji, Goa
- Authorised by: Constitution of India
- Appeals to: Supreme Court of India
- Website: https://bombayhighcourt.gov.in/bhc/

The High Court of Bombay at Goa is a permanent bench of the Bombay High Court exercising jurisdiction over the state of Goa. It is located at Panaji, the capital of Goa.

The bench forms part of the Bombay High Court and handles legal cases, appeals and judicial administration relating to the state of Goa.

The High Court of Bombay at Goa has jurisdiction over matters arising in Goa, with appeals from its decisions lying to the Supreme Court of India. The bench continues to serve as the principal High Court forum for the administration of justice in the state.

The bench has also heard significant cases arising from Goa, including appeals in high-profile criminal matters. It handles local legal cases, appeals, and judicial administration for the region.
