= Louis Addin Kershaw =

British-American judge (1844-1899)

Sir Louis Addin Kershaw KC

6th Chief Justice of Bombay High Court
- In office 12 November 1898 – 17 February 1899
- Appointed by: Queen Victoria
- Preceded by: Charles Frederick Farran
- Succeeded by: Lawrence Hugh Jenkins

5th Chief Justice of Allahabad High Court
- In office 6 April 1898 – 11 November 1898
- Appointed by: Queen Victoria
- Preceded by: John Edge
- Succeeded by: Arthur Strachey

Personal details
- Born: 27 December 1844 Ohio, United States
- Died: 17 February 1899 (aged 54) Bombay, India
- Education: Bradford Grammar School, Pembroke College, Oxford

Sir Louis Addin Kershaw (27 December 1844 – 17 February 1899) was a British-American judge who was Chief Justice of the Bombay High Court and Allahabad High Court.

== Career ==
Kershaw was born in Ohio, United States to British parents Matthew and Sarah Kershaw. He studied in Bradford Grammar School at Bradford and Pembroke College, Oxford.

On 18 November 1872, he was called to the bar at the Inner Temple and worked as revising Barrister in Yorkshire.

In 1898, he was knighted and appointed the Chief Justice of Allahabad after John Edge during the British Raj era on 6 April 1898. He became the Chief Justice of the Bombay High Court, succeeding Sir Charles Frederick Farran on 12 November 1898. Kershaw served as Queen's or King's Counsel in Bombay.
