= William Syer =

British Indian judges

Sir William Syer

First Chief Judge of Bombay
- In office 1798–1802
- Preceded by: Office established
- Succeeded by: Sir James Mackintosh

Personal details
- Born: 1760 England
- Died: 1802 (aged 41–42) Bombay, Bombay Presidency, British India
- Profession: Judge

Sir William Syer (1760 – 1802) was a British judge who served as the first chief Justice of Supreme Court of Judicature at Bombay.

== Career ==
Prior to 1798, judicial authority in the Bombay Presidency was largely handled by Mayor's Courts. For establishment of an independent judicial system, separated from the East India Company, Supreme Court of Judicature at Bombay founded in 1824. Sir William Syer was appointed as the inaugural Recorder. and thereafter became the Chief Justice until his death in Bombay in 1802.
