= R. M. Kantawala =

Indian judge (1916–1992)

Hon'ble Mr. Justice R. M. Kantawala

Chief Justice of the High Court of Bombay
- In office 27 October 1972 – 6 October 1978
- Appointed by: V. V. Giri
- Preceded by: K. Kalyandas Desai
- Succeeded by: B. N. Deshmukh

Judge, Bombay High Court
- In office 9 February 1962 – 6 October 1978
- Appointed by: Rajendra Prasad

Personal details
- Born: 6 October 1916
- Died: 2 May 1992 (aged 75)
- Children: 2 sons
- Education: University of Mumbai, Gujarat College

Justice Ramanlal Maneklal Kantawala (6 October 1916 – 2 May 1992) was an Indian judge and the Chief Justice of the Bombay High Court from 1972 to 1978. He acted as the Governor of Maharashtra state twice in 1976 and 1977.

== Background ==
Kantawala studied at the Cambay High School and Gujarat College in Ahmedabad. Later, he went to Elphinstone College and the Government Law College, Bombay. Kantawala graduated in mathematics with highest distinctions and was awarded the 'Daxina Fellowship' by the University of Bombay. He was a third generation lawyer in his family.

== Career ==
Kantawala enrolled as an advocate on the Appellate side of the High Court of Bombay in 1941 and joined its Original side after clearing his Advocate's O.S. Examination two years later. B. J. Divan had also appeared alongside him there. S. T. Desai and Hormasji Maneckji Seervai were two of the examiners for this purpose. Kantawala worked in the chambers of Natwarlal H. Bhagwati who went on to become a judge of the Supreme Court of India later.

Kantawala was appointed an additional judge of the Bombay High Court in February 1962 and made a permanent judge in 1964.

== Notable judgements ==
- The Bombay Committee of Lawyers for Civil Liberties (formed during the 1975–1977 Emergency) was to hold a private discussion meeting on Civil liberties and Rule of law restricted to lawyers and by invitation. This was in the wake of the Proclamation of Emergency by the then Prime Minister of India, Indira Gandhi. M. C. Chagla and former Chief Justice of India Jayantilal Chhotalal Shah were scheduled to be two of the speakers. The Police Commissioner denied his permission for the meeting to be held. This was challenged at the Bombay High Court and heard by a Bench of Justices Kantawala and V. D. Tulzapurkar. The court set aside the Commissioner's order in Nathwani v. The State.
