= Herbert Abingdon Draper Compton =

British judge in India (1770–1846)

Herbert Abingdon Draper Compton (1770 – 14 January 1846) was Chief Justice of the Supreme Court of Bombay, and Advocate-General of Madras and Calcutta in British India.

== Early life ==
Draper Compton was the only son of Walter Abingdon Compton of Gloucestershire. He joined the British Royal Army and served with his regiment in British India. After returning to England he spent some time in writing for the newspapers, especially for the Pilot, and studied law. On 22 November 1808, he was called to the bar at Lincoln's Inn

== Career ==
Draper Compton came in India in 1819 and joined the bar at Fort St. George. In 1822, he was appointed to the posts of Advocate-general at Madras and Calcutta High Court. In 1831 he became the Chief Justice of Bombay and was knighted.

He served as the District Grand Master of District Grand Lodge of Madras (1812-1814).

After retirement, he returned to England and died at his house in Hyde Park Gardens in 1846.
