= Naresh Harishchandra Patil =

Indian judge and former Chief Justice

Justice (Retd.) Naresh Harishchandra Patil CJ

Chief Justice of the Bombay High Court
- In office 24 October 2018 – 6 April 2019
- Appointed by: Ram Nath Kovind
- Nominated by: Ranjan Gogoi

Judge of Bombay High Court
- In office 12 October 2001 – 23 October 2018
- Nominated by: Sam Piroj Bharucha
- Appointed by: K. R. Narayan

Personal details
- Born: 7 April 1957 (age 69) Bombay, Bombay State, India
- Education: Bombay University

Naresh Harishchandra Patil (born 7 April 1957) is a retired Indian judge and former Chief Justice of the Bombay High Court.

== Career ==
In 1979, Patil graduated in the faculty of law from the Government Law College, Mumbai under the Bombay University. He was enrolled as an advocate in 1980 and started practice in the District Court at Latur from 1980 to 1982 alognwith his father who was renowned Criminal Lawyer Harishchandra Patil. After 2 years stint in Latur he practised as a lawyer in the Bombay High Court. Justice Patil was appointed an Honorary Assistant to the Government Pleader in Aurangabad Bench by the Government of Maharashtra in 1983. In 1988 he became Additional Standing Counsel for the Government of India. Justice Patil appeared several times on behalf of the Government and Government undertaking Corporation, Councils, Election Commission, Railways and for various statutory bodies in his career. He was elevated as permanent Justice of the Bombay High Court on 12 October 2001 at the age of 44. and became the acting Chief Justice in August 2018. On 24 October 2018, he was appointed Chief Justice of the Bombay High Court.
