= Kshitij R. Vyas =

Indian judge (born 1944)

Kshitij R. Vyas (born 19 July 1944) is a retired Indian judge and former Chief Justice of the Bombay High Court.

== Career ==
Vyas was born in 1944, at village Bhalod in Bharuch District of Gujarat. In 1968, he passed Law from the Maharaja Sayajirao University of Baroda and started practice in Gujarat High Court on Civil, Criminal and constitutional matters. He also appeared before the Supreme Court of India in various matters. Vyas worked as Law representative of Uchha Nyayalaya Patrika, a law Journal of Central Government. He became member of the Managing Committee of the Gujarat High Court Advocates' Association as well as elected as Joint Secretary, Secretary and Vice President of the High Court Advocates' Association at different times. On 22 November 1990, he was appointed a judge of Gujarat High Court. Justice Vyas was elevated to the post of the Chief Justice of Bombay High Court on 25 February 2006. After the retirement he became the Chairperson of Maharashtra State Human Rights Commission on 21 August 2007.
