= Madhukar Narhar Chandurkar =

Indian Judge

Madhukar Narhar Chandurkar (14 March 1926 – 28 February 2004) was a former Chief Justice of Bombay and Madras High Court. He was born in a Brahmin family in Chandurbazar village, Amravati district. His father N.B. Chandurkar was a distinguished lawyer and a Sanskrit scholar.

== Career ==
Chandurkar was born in 1926. He studied in Somalwar Academy of Nagpur and Hislop College. He passed Law from the University of Nagpur. Chandurkar enrolled as an Advocate and started practice in the Nagpur High Court in 1954 on Civil, Criminal and Tax matters. He was appointed in the post of Additional Judge of the Bombay High Court on 28 October 1967. In 1968 he became a permanent judge. Justice Chandurkar was elevated in the post of Chief Justice of the Bombay High Court on 2 January 1984. He was transferred to the Madras High Court and served there as the Chief Justice from 2 April 1984 to 13 March 1988.
