= Pradeep Nandrajog =

Former Chief Justice of Bombay High Court

Hon'ble Chief Justice (Retd.) Pradeep Nandrajog

Chief Justice of Bombay High Court
- In office 7 April 2019 – 23 February 2020
- Nominated by: Ranjan Gogoi
- Appointed by: Ram Nath Kovind
- Preceded by: Naresh Harishchandra Patil

Chief Justice of Rajasthan High Court
- In office 2 April 2017 – 6 April 2019
- Nominated by: J. S. Khehar
- Appointed by: Pranab Mukherjee
- Succeeded by: Mohammad Rafiq (Acting)

Judge of Delhi High Court
- In office 20 December 2002 – 1 April 2017
- Nominated by: Gopal Ballav Pattanaik
- Appointed by: A. P. J. Abdul Kalam

Personal details
- Born: 24 February 1958 (age 68)
- Education: Delhi University

Pradeep Nandrajog (born 24 February 1958) is a retired Indian judge. He is a former Chief Justice of Bombay High Court and Rajasthan High Court and judge of Delhi High Court.

== Career ==
He was appointed the Chief Justice of Bombay High Court on 7 April 2019, and retired on 23 February 2020.
