= H. K. Chainani =

Chief Justice of the Bombay High Court

Hashmatrai Khubchand Chainani (29 February 1904 – 28 November 1965) was an Indian judge and the Chief Justice of the Bombay High Court.

== Early life ==
Chainani was born to a Sindhi family in 1904 in British India. He first studied in Hyderabad, then was admitted to the D. J. Sindh College of Karachi. In 1925, he passed B.A. in Natural Science Tripos from Magdalene College, Cambridge, England. After passing the Indian Civil Service examinations, Chainani returned to India in 1927. He was first appointed Assistant Collector at Sholapur then at Nasik, Khandesh and Poona.

== Career ==
He started his judicial career as an Assistant Judge at Poona in 1933 and was promoted as District and Sessions Judge at Sholapur. In 1935, he was appointed Secretary to the Bombay Legislative Council and Assistant Legal Remembrancer. In 1944, Chainani became the Joint Secretary of Home Department, Government of Bombay then transferred as Deputy Secretary to the Home Department of Government of India. He also worked as Revenue Commissioner. He was promoted to a Puisne Judge of the Bombay High Court and after Justice M. C. Chagla he was appointed the Chief Justice of Bombay High Court in 1958.

In 1962, he was acting governor of the State of Maharashtra and honorary secretary of Environmental Action Group of Bombay.

Legal offices
Preceded by M. C. Chagla	Chief Justice of the Bombay High Court; 1958-1965	Succeeded by Y. S. Tambe
