= Dipankar Datta =

Judge of the Supreme Court of India

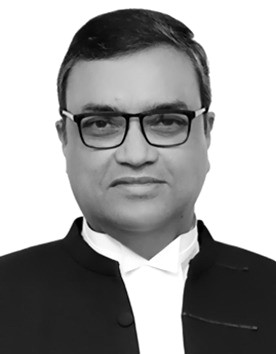

Judge of the Supreme Court of India
- Incumbent
- Assumed office 12 December 2022
- Nominated by: Uday Umesh Lalit
- Appointed by: Droupadi Murmu

45th Chief Justice of the Bombay High Court
- In office 28 April 2020 – 11 December 2022
- Nominated by: Sharad Arvind Bobde
- Appointed by: Ram Nath Kovind
- Preceded by: B. P. Dharmadhikari
- Succeeded by: R. D. Dhanuka

Judge of the Calcutta High Court
- In office 22 June 2006 – 27 April 2020
- Nominated by: Yogesh Kumar Sabharwal
- Appointed by: A. P. J. Abdul Kalam

Personal details
- Born: 9 February 1965 (age 61) Kolkata, West Bengal
- Relations: Amitava Roy (brother-in-law)
- Education: University of Calcutta

Dipankar Datta (born 9 February 1965) is an Indian jurist who is currently serving as a judge of the Supreme Court of India. He is a former chief justice of the Bombay High Court and former judge of the Calcutta High Court.

== Early life and education ==
Datta was born in 1965 in a Bengali family. He came from a family with legal background. His father late Salil Kumar Datta, was a former Judge of the Calcutta High Court. His brother in law Justice Amitava Roy, is a former Judge of the Supreme Court of India. Datta acquired his Bachelor of Laws from the Hazra Law College, University of Calcutta. He was in the first batch of 5 years Law course in the year 1989.

== Career ==
After completing his Bachelor of Laws he was enrolled as an advocate on 16 November 1989. He started practising at the High Court at Calcutta and worked as a state panel lawyer also. He also practised at the Supreme Court of India and other High Courts at other states in India. He has specialized in Constitutional matters and Civil cases. Datta was the Counsel for the Union of India since 1998. He had appeared on behalf of the School Education Department, University of Calcutta, West Bengal Board in Secondary Education and the West Bengal School Service Commission. He was the Junior Standing Counsel for the State of West Bengal from 16 May 2002 to 16 January 2004. Datta was a guest lecturer in the Hazra Law College from the year 1996–1997 to 1999–2000.

=== In High Courts ===
He was elevated to the Bench of the Calcutta High Court as a permanent Judge on 22 June 2006 and served there till April 2020.

On 23 April 2020, he was appointed as the chief justice of the Bombay High Court and took oath on 28 April 2020.

=== In Supreme Court ===
On 12 December 2022, he was elevated as a judge of the Supreme Court of India. He is due to retire on 8 February 2030.

== Controversies ==
In August 2025, Justice Dipankar Datta faced criticism for his remarks during a Supreme Court hearing of a criminal defamation case against Rahul Gandhi, the Leader of Opposition in the Lok Sabha. The case stemmed from Gandhi's statements during the Bharat Jodo Yatra in December 2022, where he alleged that Chinese troops had occupied 2,000 square kilometers of Indian territory and were "thrashing Indian Army soldiers" in Arunachal Pradesh. Justice Datta questioned the credibility of Gandhi's claims, stating, "How do you get to know that 2,000 square kilometres of Indian territory was occupied by China? What is the credible material? If you are a true Indian, you would not say this." He further asked why such statements were made on social media instead of in Parliament. These remarks drew objections from Congress leaders and the INDIA bloc, who deemed them "unwarranted" and an overreach into political rights, with Odisha Congress president Bhakta Charan Das asserting that Justice Datta had "no business questioning Rahul Gandhi's Indianness." Priyanka Gandhi Vadra also defended her brother, stating that it is not the judiciary's role to determine who qualifies as a "true Indian." Despite the controversy, the Supreme Court stayed the defamation proceedings against Gandhi.
