= Nitin Madhukar Jamdar =

39th Chief Justice of Kerala High Court

Hon'ble Chief Justice (Retd) Nitin Madhukar Jamdar

39th Chief Justice of Kerala High Court
- In office 26 September 2024 – 9 January 2026
- Nominated by: D. Y. Chandrachud
- Appointed by: Droupadi Murmu
- Preceded by: A. J. Desai; A. M. Mustaque (acting)
- Succeeded by: Soumen Sen

Judge of Bombay High Court
- In office 23 January 2012 – 25 September 2024
- Nominated by: S. H. Kapadia
- Appointed by: Pratibha Patil
- Acting Chief Justice
- In office 31 May 2023 – 28 July 2023
- Appointed by: Droupadi Murmu
- Preceded by: R. D. Dhanuka
- Succeeded by: D. K. Upadhyaya

Personal details
- Born: 10 January 1964 (age 62) Solapur
- Education: Government Law College, Mumbai

Nitin Madhukar Jamdar (born 10 January 1964) is a retired Indian judge who served as Chief Justice of Kerala High Court. He is a former Judge of Bombay High Court where he also served as its acting chief justice.

== Family and career ==
Justice Jamdar was born in a family of lawyers and social reformers. His grandfather S. N. Jamdar was a lawyer and District Government Pleader who was instrumental in establishing social and educational institutions in Solapur. His grandmother R. S. Jamdar, was a social worker and helped in establishing institutions aimed at empowering women. His uncle was Flight Lieutenant Shashikant Jamdar, who was martyred at the border in 1962. Jamdar's father M. S. Jamdar was also a judge of Bombay High Court from 1979 to 1986. His father founded the first law college in the Solapur.

He began his legal practise in 1989 and was elevated as additional judge of Bombay High Court on 23 January 2012. He became permanent judge on 16 December 2013 and was appointed as Acting Chief of Bombay High Court consequent upon the retirement of the then CJ R. D. Dhanuka on 30 May 2023 and served as such until appointment of D. K. Upadhyaya as permanent CJ on 29 July 2023.

The Collegium of the Supreme Court of India recommended his appointment as Chief Justice of Kerala High Court on 11 July 2024. He was appointed as Chief Justice of Kerala High Court on 21 September 2024 and retired on 9 January 2026.
