= Henry Roper (judge) =

British judge

Henry Roper (1800–1863) was a British barrister and judge who served as Chief Justice of Bombay Supreme Court in British india.

== Life ==
He was the son of William Roper, and a great-grandson of the marriage between Henry Roper, 8th Baron Teynham and his third wife Anne Barrett-Lennard, 16th Baroness Dacre. His mother was Elizabeth Fish, daughter of Robert Fish of Castle Fish (i.e. Tober(r)ogan), County Kildare, and sister of the Wexford Borough Member of Parliament John Fish.

In London, Roper was called to the bar at Lincoln's Inn in 1826. He frequented the home in Cadogan Place of Anna Wilford (nee Forbes, previous married name Crause, died 1842), widow of General Richard (died 1822). There he met the journalist Joachim Hayward Stocqueler.

Roper moved to India in 1827, according to Stocqueler, or 1828, to practise in the Bombay Supreme Court, as a barrister. Stocqueler had travelled there in 1827. He related that Roper's first case was a hot potato, taking the side of an attorney in dispute with a barrister. When the Bombay Bar complained to Edward West, West suspended the barristers involved. West died in 1828, but Roper had opened his Indian career by then. Stocqueler started a newspaper, the Iris, and an attack he made on the editor of the Bombay Gazette cost him a challenge to a duel from its editor. Roper, who contributed to the Iris, acted as his second.

Having worked in Bombay as Clerk of the Crown, Roper was made a Supreme Court judge in 1838, when he was knighted. He was made Chief Justice in 1841. At the beginning of his tenure, he summoned the proprietors of the Bombay Courier and Bombay Times to court, to answer contempt of court charges. In 1844 both Roper and Thomas Erskine Perry, then the puisne judge who served with him, sent comments to the India Law Commission under Edward Law, 2nd Baron Ellenborough, for a report on law reform. Their ideas differed significantly, the Commissioners finding merit in Roper's ideas on "logical principles of pleading", and in Erskine's on "oral over written pleading".

Roper retired in 1846, in "impaired health", returning to the United Kingdom. He died in 1863 at Stoke House, near Chichester.

== Family ==
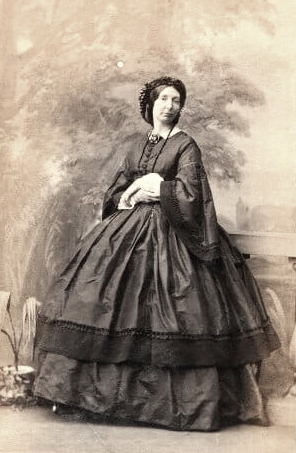
Charlotte Lydia, Lady Roper, 1861 photograph

Roper married in 1847 Charlotte Lydia Pleydell-Bouverie, daughter of the Rev. Frederick Pleydell-Bouverie, canon of Salisbury Cathedral, and granddaughter of Jacob Pleydell-Bouverie, 2nd Earl of Radnor. The couple had two sons and three daughters; the sons were Henry Charles Roper, a barrister, and Alexander William Roper of the Royal Engineers. Of the daughters, Elizabeth Catherine (1857–1942) married the Rev. Carew Hervey Mildmay (1863–1937) in 1912.
