= Manharlal Bhikhalal Shah =

Indian judge (born 1938)

Manharlal Bhikhalal Shah (born 25 September 1938) is a retired judge of the Supreme Court of India.

== Early life ==
Shah was born in 1938 at Dehgam in Ahmedabad District of Gujarat. He passed SSC Examination in 1953 and joined L.D. Arts College of Ahmedabad. Shah graduated in Economics in 1958 and in 1962 he completed M.Com. in Statistics. In 1962, he passed LL.B. from Sir L.A. Shah Law College.

== Career ==
Shah started practice in 1963 in the Gujarat High Court on Constitutional, Civil and Criminal matters. He also served as a lecturer in Motilal Nehru Law College since September 1971. He was appointed Assistant Government Pleader and Public Prosecutor in Gujarat High Court. On 28 January 1983, Shah was appointed Additional Judge of the same High Court. On 2 August 1995, he became the Chief Justice of the Bombay High Court. Justice Shah was elevated as judge of the Supreme Court of India on 9 December 1998 and retired on 24 September 2003. He was appointed the Chairman of the Special Investigation Team looking into the black money issue in India. In 2016, Justice Shah published a book named Commentary on Law of Mines & Minerals.
