= S. P. Kotval =

Indian judge (1910–1987)

Chief Justice of the Bombay High Court
- In office 1 August 1966 – 27 September 1972

Personal details
- Born: September 1910
- Died: 6 March 1987 (aged 76)
- Education: Morris College; University College of Law at Nagpur

Sohrab Peshotan Kotval (September 1910 – 6 March 1987) was an Indian judge who served as Chief Justice of the Bombay High Court from 1 August 1966 until 27 September 1972.

He took his education at St. Joseph's Convent, Nagpur and later at Billimoria High School, Panchgani. He graduated from Morris College (now known as Nagpur Mahavidyalaya) and got his LL.B. from the University College of Law at Nagpur.

He practised at the Bar at Nagpur since 1932 and practised in the Nagpur and later Madhya Pradesh High Courts as well as in the Federal Court and the Supreme Court. Upon the reorganization of the States in 1956, he sat as Judge on the Nagpur Bench of the Bombay High Court.
