= Anil R. Dave =

Indian judge (born 1951)

Judge of the Supreme Court of India
- In office 30 April 2010 – 18 November 2016
- Appointed by: Pratibha Patil

Chief Justice of the Bombay High Court
- In office 11 February 2010 – 29 April 2010
- Appointed by: Pratibha Patil

Chief Justice of the High Court of Judicature at Hyderabad
- In office 7 January 2008 – 10 February 2010
- Appointed by: Pratibha Patil

Judge of the Gujarat High Court
- In office 18 September 1995 – 6 January 2008

Personal details
- Born: 19 November 1951 (age 74) Gangtok, Sikkim, India
- Spouse: Meena Anil Dave
- Education: B.Com., LL.M., C.A
- Website: Supreme Court of India

Anil Ramesh Dave (born 19 November 1951) is a former judge at the Supreme Court of India and the current Executive-Chairman of the National Legal Services Authority. Before being elevated to the Supreme Court, he was chief justice of the Andhra Pradesh High Court and Bombay High Court.

== Career ==
Dave enrolled as an advocate on 25 July 1976 and started practicing in various matters. He served as a solicitor to the Government of Gujarat, additional government pleader to the Gujarat High Court and part-time lecturer in Sir L.A. Shah Law College. He was appointed additional judge to the Gujarat High Court on 18 September 1995 and confirmed as permanent judge on 18 June 1997. Thereafter he was transferred to the Andhra Pradesh High Court as the chief justice on 7 January 2008. While holding the post of chief justice of High Court of Judicature at Hyderabad, he served as the patron and chairman of the Advisory Council of International Centre for Alternative Dispute Resolution (ICADR), Regional Centre, Hyderabad and Chancellor of NALSAR University of Law, Hyderabad. On 11 February 2010 he was transferred to the Bombay High Court and elevated as a judge of the Supreme Court of India on 30 April 2010. He retired as a judge on 19 November 2016.
