= Ramesh Deokinandan Dhanuka =

Former Chief Justice of Bombay High Court

Hon'ble Chief Justice (Retd.) Ramesh Deokinandan Dhanuka

Chief Justice of Bombay High Court
- In office 28 May 2023 – 30 May 2023
- Nominated by: Dhananjaya Y. Chandrachud
- Appointed by: Droupadi Murmu

Judge of Bombay High Court
- In office 23 January 2012 – 27 May 2023
- Nominated by: S. H. Kapadia
- Appointed by: Pratibha Patil

Personal details
- Born: 31 May 1961 (age 65)
- Education: University of Bombay

Ramesh Deokinandan Dhanuka (born 31 May 1961) is an Indian judge. He is a former Chief Justice of Bombay High Court.
