= List of chief justices of the Gujarat High Court =

Chief Justice of Gujarat High Court
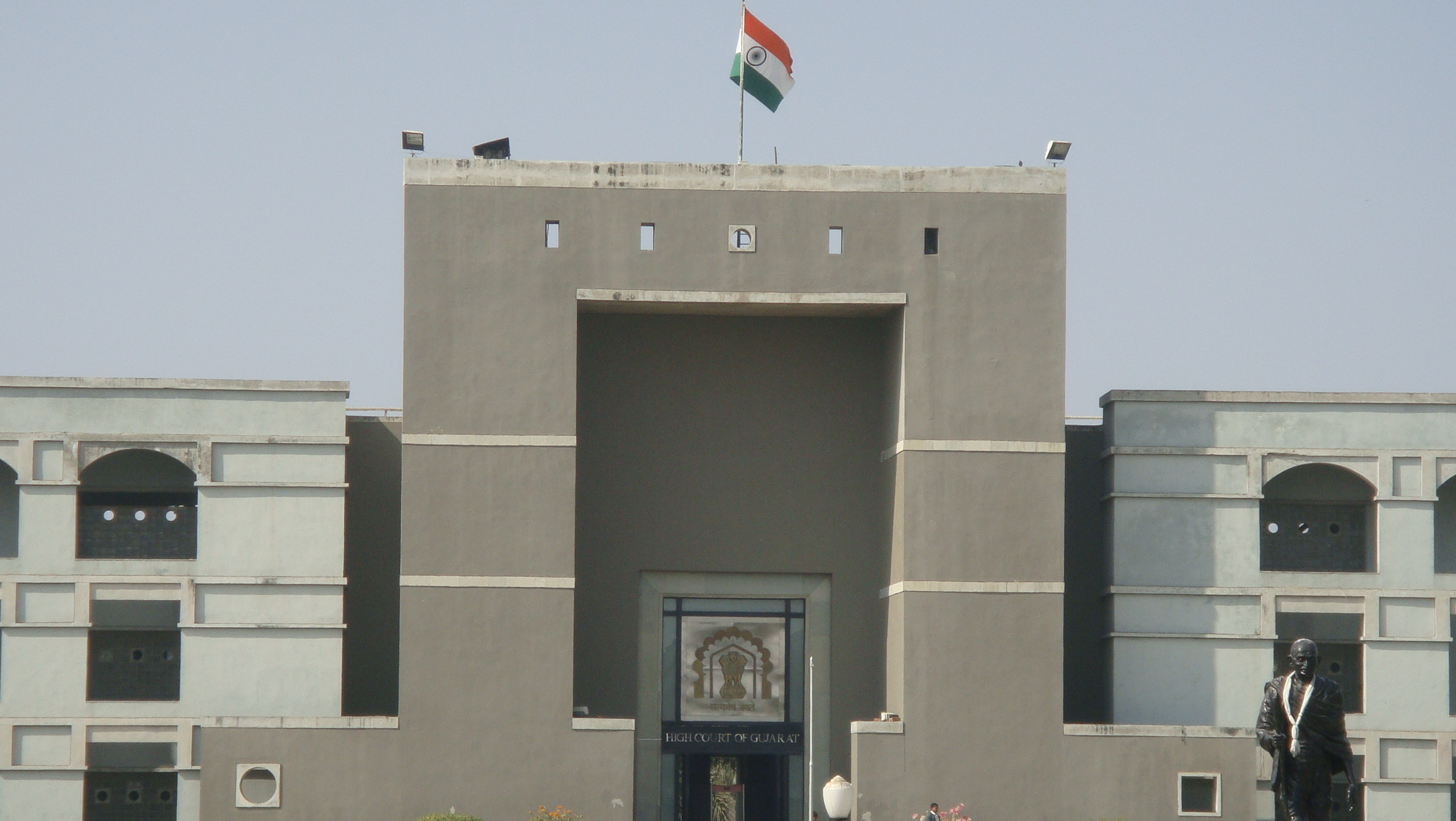
- Incumbent; Manash Ranjan Pathak (Acting CJ) since 7 October 2026
- Gujarat High Court
- Abbreviation: CJ Gujarat
- Seat: Ahmedabad, Gujarat, India
- Nominator: Collegium of the Supreme Court
- Appointer: President of India
- Term length: till the age of 62 yrs
- Constituting instrument: Constitution of India (under Article 214)
- Formation: 1 May 1960; 66 years ago
- First holder: Justice S. T. Desai (1 May 1960 – 25 January 1961)
- Salary: ₹250,000 (US$2,700) (per month)
- Website: http://gujarathighcourt.nic.in/

The Chief Justice of Gujarat presides over the Gujarat High Court. They are not appointed by the President of India under warrant. The President is required to consult the Governor of Gujarat and the Chief Justice of India before making such appointment. The Governor of Gujarat administers the oath of office at time of appointment. The current Chief Justice of the High Court of Gujarat is Justice Manash Ranjan Pathak.

== List ==
The Gujarat High Court was established on 1 May 1960 under the Bombay Reorganisation Act, 1960 and has had 28 permanent Chief Justices and several Acting Chief Justices. 2022 Annual report of Gujarat High Court contains list of all former acting chief justices till the time of publishing report.

Colour Key

- Served as Chief Justice of India
- Female Chief Justice
- Elevated to Supreme Court of India
- Female chief justice elevated to Supreme Court of India

Symbol Key

- ^{‡} Resigned
- ^{†} Died in office

Chief Justices elevated to Supreme Court of India includes those who were elevated to supreme court at any point of their career.

Chief Justices mentioned in italics were those who were serving as Acting Chief Justice in the same high court immediately before their permanent appointment.

Date of initial appointment - Date of first appointment as High court judge

CJ - Chief Justice

#	Name	Portrait	Date of Appointment	Date of Retirement	Tenure	Parent High Court	Date of initial Appointment	Notes
1	Sunderlal Trikamlal Desai		1 May 1960	25 January 1961	270 days	Bombay	9 October 1952	
2	Kantilal Thakoredas Desai		26 January 1961	22 May 1963	2 years, 117 days	Bombay	6 January 1957	
3	Jaishanker Manilal Shelat		31 May 1963	23 February 1966	2 years, 269 days	Bombay	6 January 1957	(Note: He became ACJ on 23 May 1963 and served till 30 May 1963 for 8 days before becoming permanent Chief Justice and later elevated to Supreme Court of India)
4	Nomanbhai Mahmedbhai Miabhoy		21 April 1966	5 September 1967	1 year, 138 days	Bombay	22 March 1957	(Note: He became ACJ on 24 February 1966 and served till 20 April 1966 for 126 days before becoming permanent Chief Justice)
5	Prafullachandra Natwarlal Bhagwati		16 September 1967	17 July 1973	5 years, 305 days	Gujarat	21 July 1960	
6 Expand	Bipinchandra Jivanlal Diwan		18 July 1973	29 June 1976	2 years, 348 days	Gujarat	19 April 1962	(Note: Transferred to Undivided Andhra Pradesh High Court)
--	Jayantilal Bapalal Mehta		30 June 1976	6 July 1976	7 days	Gujarat	5 August 1963	
7 Expand	Seshareddi Obul Reddy		7 July 1976	18 August 1977	1 year, 43 days	Andhra Pradesh	8 July 1966	(Note: CJ of Undivided Andhra Pradesh High Court transferred as CJ of Gujarat and subsequently transferred back to the same High Court)
--	Jayantilal Bapalal Mehta		19 August 1977	27 August 1977	9 days	Gujarat	5 August 1963	
(6)	Bipinchandra Jivanlal Diwan		28 August 1977	19 August 1981	3 years, 357 days	Gujarat	19 April 1962	(Note: CJ of Undivided Andhra Pradesh High Court transferred as CJ of Gujarat)
8 Expand	Manharlal Pranlal Thakkar		20 August 1981	14 March 1983	1 year, 207 days	Gujarat	2 July 1969	
--	P. D. Desai		15 March 1983	27 September 1983	197 days	Gujarat	19 February 1970	
9 Expand	Padmanabham Subramanian Poti		28 September 1983	1 February 1985	1 year, 127 days	Kerala	20 March 1969	(Note: CJ of Kerala High Court transferred as CJ of Gujarat)
--	Batukumar Kantiprasad Mehta		2 February 1985	20 March 1985	47 days	Gujarat	19 February 1970	
10 Expand	Puliyangudi Ramaiyapillai Gokulakrishnan		21 March 1985	12 August 1990	5 years, 145 days	Madras	11 July 1969	
--	Rameshkumar Chunilal Mankad		13 August 1990	1 December 1990	111 days	Gujarat	28 December 1977	
11 Expand	Ganendra Narayan Ray		2 December 1990	6 October 1991	309 days	Calcutta	23 December 1976	
--	Rameshkumar Chunilal Mankad		7 October 1991	18 February 1992	135 days	Gujarat	28 December 1977	(Note: Retired as ACJ)
--	Shailesh Bhadrayulal Majmudar		19 February 1992	14 June 1992	117 days	Gujarat	3 October 1978	
12	Sundaram Nainar Sundaram		15 June 1992	13 December 1993	1 year, 182 days	Madras	4 January 1978	
13 Expand	Bhupinder Nath Kirpal		14 December 1993	10 September 1995	1 year, 272 days	Delhi	20 November 1979	
--	R. A. Mehta		11 September 1995	1 July 1996	294 days	Gujarat	5 September 1983	
14 Expand	Gurudas Datta Kamat		2 July 1996	4 January 1997	187 days	Bombay	29 August 1983	
--	R. A. Mehta		5 January 1997	19 October 1997	288 days	Gujarat	5 September 1983	
15	Kumaran Sreedharan		20 October 1997	3 June 1998	227 days	Kerala	10 September 1985	(Note: CJ of Punjab & Haryana High Court transferred as CJ of Gujarat)
16 Expand	Konakuppakattil Gopinathan Balakrishnan		16 July 1998	8 September 1999	1 year, 55 days	Kerala	26 September 1985	(Note: He became ACJ on 4 June 1998 and served till 15 July 1998 for 42 days before becoming permanent Chief Justice and later transferred as CJ to Madras High Court)
--	C. K. Thakker		9 September 1999	24 January 2000	138 days	Gujarat	21 June 1990	
17 Expand	Devdatta Madhav Dharmadhikari		25 January 2000	4 March 2002	2 years, 39 days	Madhya Pradesh	24 March 1989	
--	B. C. Patel		5 March 2002	16 March 2002	12 days	Gujarat	21 June 1990	
18 Expand	Daya Saran Sinha		17 March 2002	17 March 2003	1 year, 1 day	Allahabad	17 March 1986	
--	J. N. Bhatt		18 March 2003	24 August 2003	160 days	Gujarat	21 June 1990	
19 Expand	Bhawani Singh		25 August 2003	28 March 2006	2 years, 216 days	Himachal Pradesh	16 December 1988	(Note: CJ of Madhya Pradesh High Court transferred as CJ of Gujarat)
--	Behram Jahanbux Shethna		28 March 2006	2 April 2006	6 days	Gujarat	22 November 1990	
20 Expand	Yad Ram Meena		3 February 2007	30 June 2008	1 year, 149 days	Rajasthan	20 July 1990	(Note: Meena was serving as Judge of Rajasthan High Court when he was transferred as ACJ and served as such from 3 April 2006 to 2 February 2007 for 306 days before becoming permanent Chief Justice)
--	M. S. Shah		1 July 2008	3 September 2008	65 days	Gujarat	18 September 1995	
21 Expand	Kalavamkodath Sivasankara Panicker Radhakrishnan		4 September 2008	16 November 2009	1 year, 74 days	Kerala	17 May 1995	(Note: CJ of Jammu & Kashmir High Court transferred as CJ of Gujarat)
--	M. S. Shah		16 November 2009	8 December 2009	23 days	Gujarat	18 September 1995	
22 Expand	Sudhanshu Joshi Mukhopadhaya		9 December 2009	12 September 2011	1 year, 278 days	Patna	8 November 1994	
--	Ashokkumar Laxminarayan Dave		13 September 2011	7 November 2011	56 days	Gujarat	11 December 1997	
23 Expand	Bhaskar Bhattacharya		21 July 2012	28 September 2014	2 years, 70 days	Calcutta	17 July 1997	(Note: Bhattacharya was serving as Judge of Calcutta High Court when he was transferred as ACJ and served as such from 8 November 2011 to 20 July 2012 for 256 days before becoming permanent Chief Justice)
--	Vijay Manohar Sahai		29 September 2014	12 August 2015	318 days	Allahabad	5 February 1999	
--	Jayant Maganlal Patel		13 August 2015	12 February 2016	184 days	Gujarat	3 December 2001	(Note: Transferred as Judge to Karnataka High Court)
24 Expand	Ramayyagari Subhash Reddy		13 February 2016	1 November 2018	2 years, 262 days	Andhra Pradesh	2 December 2002	
--	A. A. Kureshi		2 November 2018	13 November 2018	12 days	Gujarat	7 March 2004	(Note: Transferred as Judge to Bombay High Court)
--	A. S. Dave		14 November 2018	9 September 2019	300 days	Gujarat	8 October 2004	
25 Expand	Vikram Nath		10 September 2019	30 August 2021	1 year, 355 days	Allahabad	24 September 2004	
--	Vineet Kothari		31 August 2021	2 September 2021	3 days	Rajasthan	13 June 2005	
--	R. M. Chhaya		2 September 2021	12 October 2021	41 days	Gujarat	17 February 2011	
26	Aravind Kumar		13 October 2021	12 February 2023	1 year, 123 days	Karnataka	26 June 2009	
27 Expand	Sonia Giridhar Gokani		16 February 2023	25 February 2023	10 days	Gujarat	17 February 2011	(Note: She became ACJ on 13 February 2023 and served till 15 February 2023 for 3 days before becoming permanent Chief Justice)
--	A. J. Desai		26 February 2023	22 July 2023	147 days	Gujarat	21 November 2011	(Note: Elevated as Chief Justice of Kerala High Court)
28	Sunita Agarwal		23 July 2023	5 October 2026	3 years, 75 days	Allahabad	21 November 2011	

== Chief justices before creation of Gujarat High Court ==
This is the list of former chief justices of the Supreme Court of Bombay and Bombay High Court till 1 May 1960 because these two courts had jurisdiction over the region of present day Gujarat. On 1 May 1960, separate state of Gujarat was carved out from Bombay State under Bombay Reorganisation Act, 1960. Thus jurisdiction of Bombay High Court over Gujarat ceased to exist from that day.

#	Name	Portrait	Date of Appointment	Date of Retirement	Tenure	Parent High Court	Date of initial Appointment	Notes & References
1	William Syer		1798	Died 1802				
2	James Mackintosh		1803					
3	John Henry Newbolt		1811					
4	Alexander Anstruther		1812	Died 1819				
5	William David Evans		1820	Died 1821				
6	Edward West		1822					(Note: Became Chief Justice of Supreme Court, 1823)
6	Edward West		1823					(Note: first year was in the Recorder's Court)
7	James Dewar		1829					
8	Herbert Abingdon Draper Compton		1831					
9	John Wither Awdry		1839					
10	Henry Roper		1840					
11	David Pollock		1846					
12	Thomas Erskine Perry		1847					
13	William Yardley		1852					
14	Matthew Richard Sausse		1859					(Note: became Bombay High Court Chief Judge in 1862)
Chief Justices of the Bombay High Court
1	Matthew Richard Sausse		14 August 1862	27 April 1866	3 years, 257 days	Bar	--	
2	Richard Couch		28 April 1866	31 March 1870	3 years, 338 days	Bombay	14 August 1862	(Note: Transferred to Calcutta High Court)
3	Michael Roberts Westropp		1 April 1870	8 August 1882	12 years, 130 days	Bombay	1863	
4	Charles Sargent		9 August 1882	19 June 1895	12 years, 315 days	Bombay	3 March 1866	
5	Charles Frederick Farran		20 June 1895	9 September 1898^{[†]}	3 years, 82 days	Bombay	1890	
6	Louis Addin Kershaw		12 November 1898	17 February 1899^{[†]}	98 days	Bar	--	(Note: CJ of Allahabad High Court transferred as CJ of Bombay)
7	Lawrence Hugh Jenkins		20 April 1899	14 March 1909	9 years, 329 days	Calcutta	24 April 1896	
8	Basil Scott		22 April 1908	31 May 1919	11 years, 40 days	Bar	--	
9	Norman Cranstoun Macleod		1 June 1919	6 June 1926	7 years, 6 days	Bombay	1910	
10	Amberson Barrington Marten		7 June 1926	17 June 1930^{[‡]}	4 years, 11 days	Bombay	1916	
11	John William Fisher Beaumont		20 June 1930	29 September 1943	13 years, 102 days	Bar	--	
12	Leonard Stone		30 September 1943	3 January 1948^{[‡]}	4 years, 96 days	Bar	--	
After Independence
13	Mahommedali Currim Chagla		6 February 1948	26 October 1958^{[‡]}	10 years, 257 days	Bombay	4 August 1941	(Note: He became ACJ on 3 January 1948 and served till 5 February 1948 for 34 days before becoming permanent Chief Justice)
14	Hashmatrai Khubchand Chainani		27 October 1958	28 November 1965^{[†]}	7 years, 33 days	Bombay	28 August 1948	

During the tenure of Hashmatrai Khubchand Chainani, separate High Court for state of Gujarat was established.
