= Presidency of Ram Nath Kovind =

Indian politician

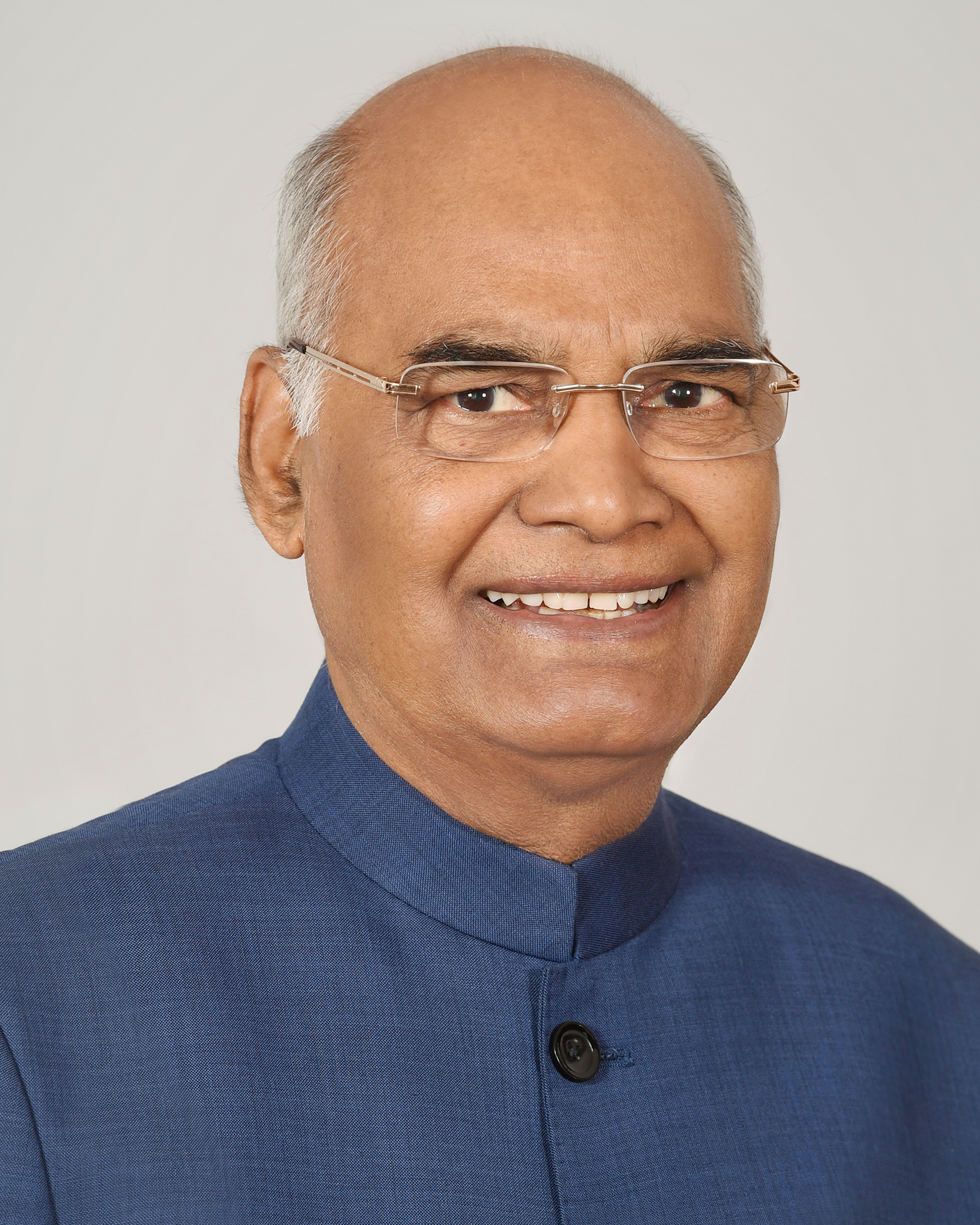
- Official portrait, c. 2017
- Presidency of Ram Nath Kovind; 25 July 2017 – 25 July 2022
- President: Ram Nath Kovind
- Party: Bharatiya Janata Party
- Election: 2017 Indian presidential election
- Seat: Rashtrapati Bhawan
- Emblem of India

The presidency of Ram Nath Kovind began on 25 July 2017, when Ram Nath Kovind took the oath as the fourteenth president of India administered by Chief Justice Jagdish Singh Khehar. Kovind was the Bharatiya Janata Party (BJP)-led National Democratic Alliance (NDA) nominee and defeated the Indian National Congress (Congress)-led United Progressive Alliance (UPA) nominee and former speaker of Lok Sabha, Meira Kumar. Prior to being the presidential nominee, he was the governor of Bihar and a member of parliament in Rajya Sabha. Kovind secured approximately two-thirds of the electoral college vote of the elected members of the federal, state and union territory legislatures.

During his presidency, he has undertaken state visits to 28 countries. He has received the highest state honors from six countries, Madagascar, Equatorial Guinea, Eswatini, Croatia, Bolivia and the Republic of Guinea. Just a few weeks after starting his presidency, Venkaiah Naidu, the BJP candidate for vice president won the 2017 Indian vice presidential election; President Kovind administered the oath of the office. In 2019, he administered the oath of office to Narendra Modi upon his re-election. He has held the office during the COVID-19 pandemic in India and subsequent lockdowns. He is the first leader from Rashtriya Swayamsevak Sangh to occupy the office of president of India.

He appointed Dipak Misra, Ranjan Gogoi, Sharad Arvind Bobde and N. V. Ramana as chief justice of the Supreme Court, and other judges of the Supreme Court and the High Courts.

== Presidential election of 2017 ==
The 2017 electoral college vote

The presidential election took place on 17 July 2017, with the votes counted and the results announced on 20 July 2017. President Pranab Mukherjee, whose term of office was due to expire on 24 July 2017, declined to seek re-election due to health concerns and old age, so the INC nominated Meira Kumar as its candidate for president. Kovind thus resigned from the post of Governor of Bihar on 20 June 2017, to contest the election.

| Party (Alliance) | Candidate | Electoral Votes | Vote Percentage | States carried |
|---|---|---|---|---|
| BJP (NDA) | Ram Nath Kovind | 702,044 | 65.65% | 21 |
| INC (UPA) | Meira Kumar | 367,314 | 34.35% | 10 |

Kovind won the election, getting roughly two-thirds of the electoral college vote. He defeated the Indian National Congress (Congress) nominee and former speaker of Lok Sabha, Meira Kumar. He was the first leader from Rashtriya Swayamsevak Sangh to occupy the office of president of India.

Meira Kumar's vote share was the second-highest for a losing candidate; Neelam Sanjiva Reddy's vote share in the 1969 Presidential elections was the highest ever. The National Democratic Alliance (NDA) coalition share was around 25,000 electoral votes, but they expected other small parties MLA's and MP's to vote for their candidate.

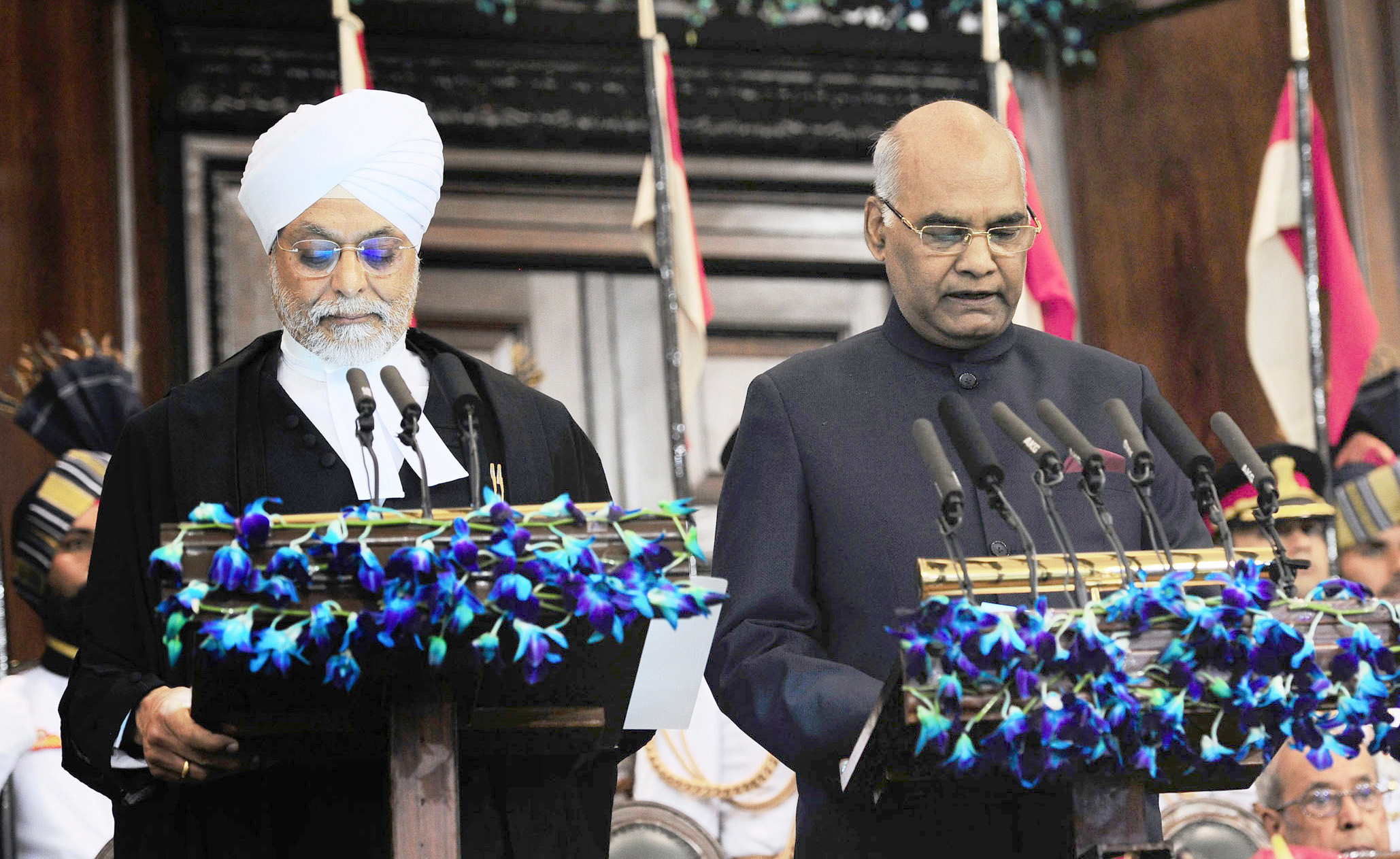
Chief Justice administering oath to President-elect Kovind.

Kovind took the presidential oath on 25 July 2017, administered by Justice J.S. Khehar India, at a swearing-in ceremony in the central hall of Parliament, in New Delhi.

== Domestic affairs ==
=== President's rule ===
Under Article 356 of the Constitution of India, if a state government cannot function according to Constitutional provisions, the Union government can take direct control of the state machinery by imposing the President's rule in the state. President Kovind has imposed President's rule in three states during his presidency.

Kovind imposed President's rule in the former state of Jammu and Kashmir from 19 June 2018, to 31 October 2019, as chief minister Mehbooba Mufti resigned. It continued until 31 October 2019, when the state was split into two Union Territories on Jammu and Kashmir and Ladakh. After the states were split, President's rule continued in the union territory of Jammu and Kashmir imposed under section 73 of the Jammu and Kashmir Reorganisation Act, 2019.

As no party could form a government after a fractured election outcome because of the 2019 Maharashtra political crisis, Kovind imposed President's rule in Maharashtra from 12 November 2019, to 23 November 2019. It was lifted when Devendra Fadnavis was sworn in as chief minister; he soon resigned and Uddhav Thackeray became the chief minister.

In Puducherry, President's rule was imposed from 25 February 2021, upon the resignation of the chief minister when there was no alternate claimant to form the next government.

== Oaths administered ==
President Kovind administered oath to judges Dipak Misra, Ranjan Gogoi, Sharad Arvind Bobde and N. V. Ramana as chief justices of the Supreme Court and 29 Supreme Court justices. They were:

| Sr. No. | Name | Date of Appointment | Parent High Court | Source |
|---|---|---|---|---|
| 1 | Indu Malhotra | 27 April 2018 | Bar Council | |
| 2 | Indira Banerjee | 7 August 2018 | Calcutta | |
| 3 | Vineet Saran | 7 August 2018 | Allahabad | |
| 4 | K. M. Joseph | 7 August 2018 | Kerala | |
| 5 | Hemant Gupta | 2 November 2018 | Punjab and Haryana | |
| 6 | Ramayyagari Subhash Reddy | 2 November 2018 | Telangana | |
| 7 | Mukesh Shah | 2 November 2018 | Gujarat | |
| 8 | Ajay Rastogi | 2 November 2018 | Rajasthan | |
| 9 | Dinesh Maheshwari | 18 January 2019 | Rajasthan | |
| 10 | Sanjiv Khanna | 18 January 2019 | Delhi | |
| 11 | Bhushan Ramkrishna Gavai | 24 May 2019 | Bombay | |
| 12 | Surya Kant | 24 May 2019 | Punjab and Haryana | |
| 13 | Aniruddha Bose | 24 May 2019 | Calcutta | |
| 14 | A. S. Bopanna | 24 May 2019 | Karnataka | |
| 15 | Krishna Murari | 23 September 2019 | Allahabad | |
| 16 | Shripathi Ravindra Bhat | 23 September 2019 | Delhi | |
| 17 | V. Ramasubramanian | 23 September 2019 | Madras | |
| 18 | Hrishikesh Roy | 23 September 2019 | Gauhati | |
| 19 | A. S. Oka | 31 August 2021 | Bombay | |
| 20 | Vikram Nath | 31 August 2021 | Allahabad | |
| 21 | Jitendra Kumar Maheshwari | 31 August 2021 | Madhya Pradesh | |
| 22 | Hima Kohli | 31 August 2021 | Delhi | |
| 23 | B. V. Nagarathna | 31 August 2021 | Karnataka | |
| 24 | C. T. Ravikumar | 31 August 2021 | Kerala | |
| 25 | M. M. Sundresh | 31 August 2021 | Madras | |
| 26 | Bela Trivedi | 31 August 2021 | Gujarat | |
| 27 | P. S. Narasimha | 31 August 2021 | Bar Council | |
| 28 | Sudhanshu Dhulia | 9 May 2022 | Uttarakhand | |
| 29 | Jamshed Burjor Pardiwala | 9 May 2022 | Gujarat | |

Chief Justices being administered oath by President Kovind

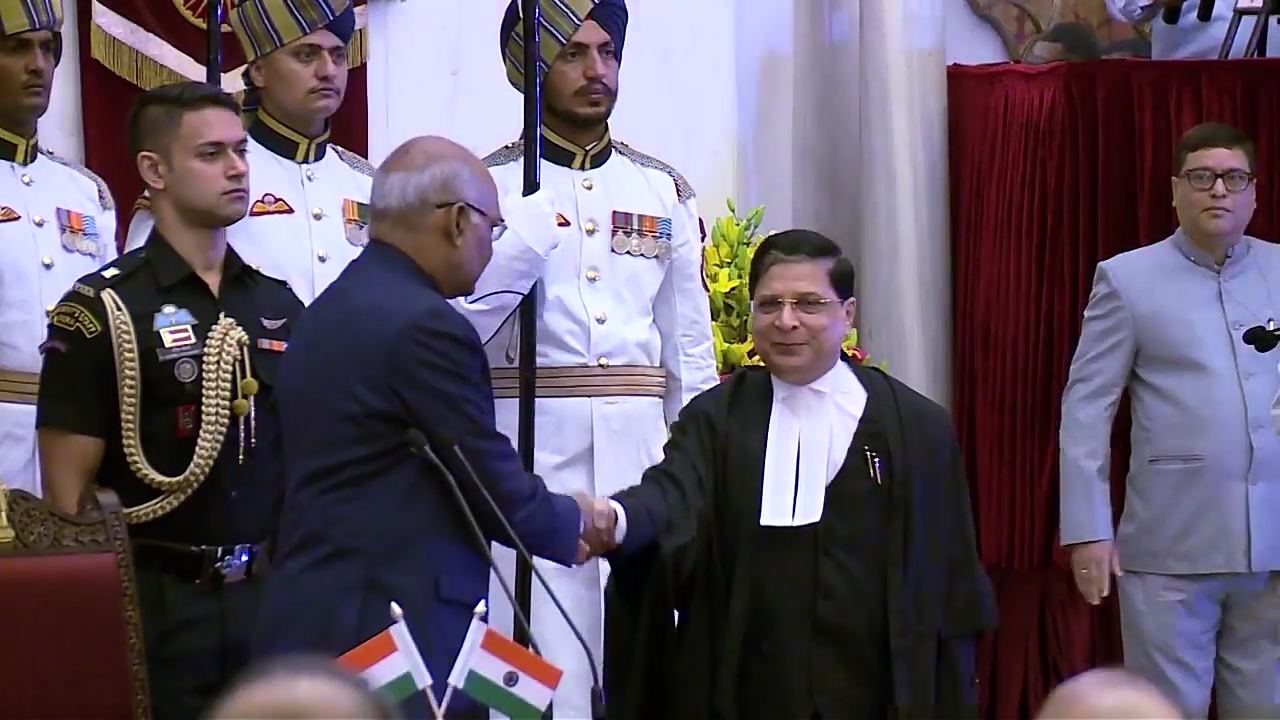
President Kovind administering the oath to Dipak Misra.

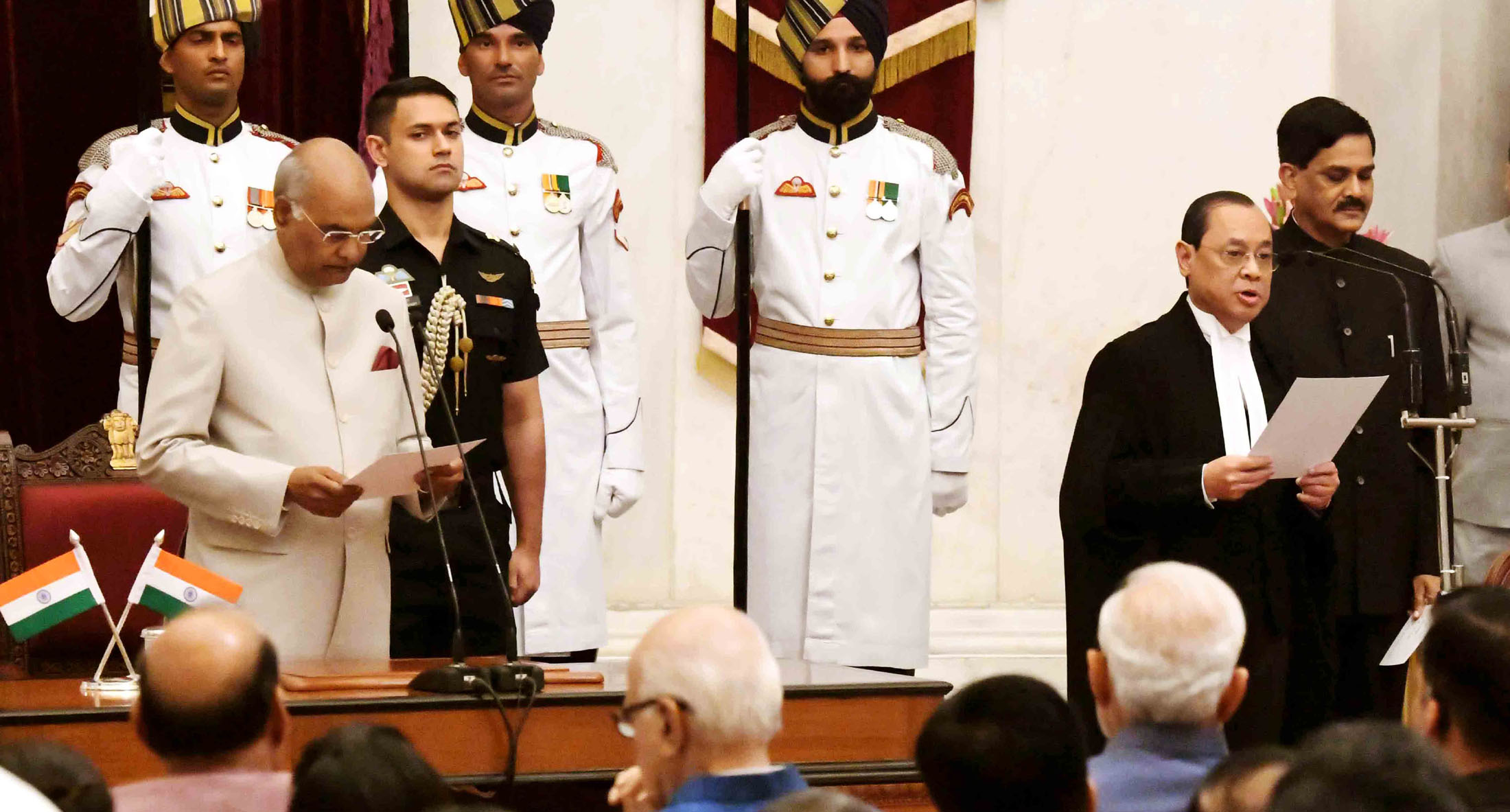
President Kovind administering the oath to Ranjan Gogoi.

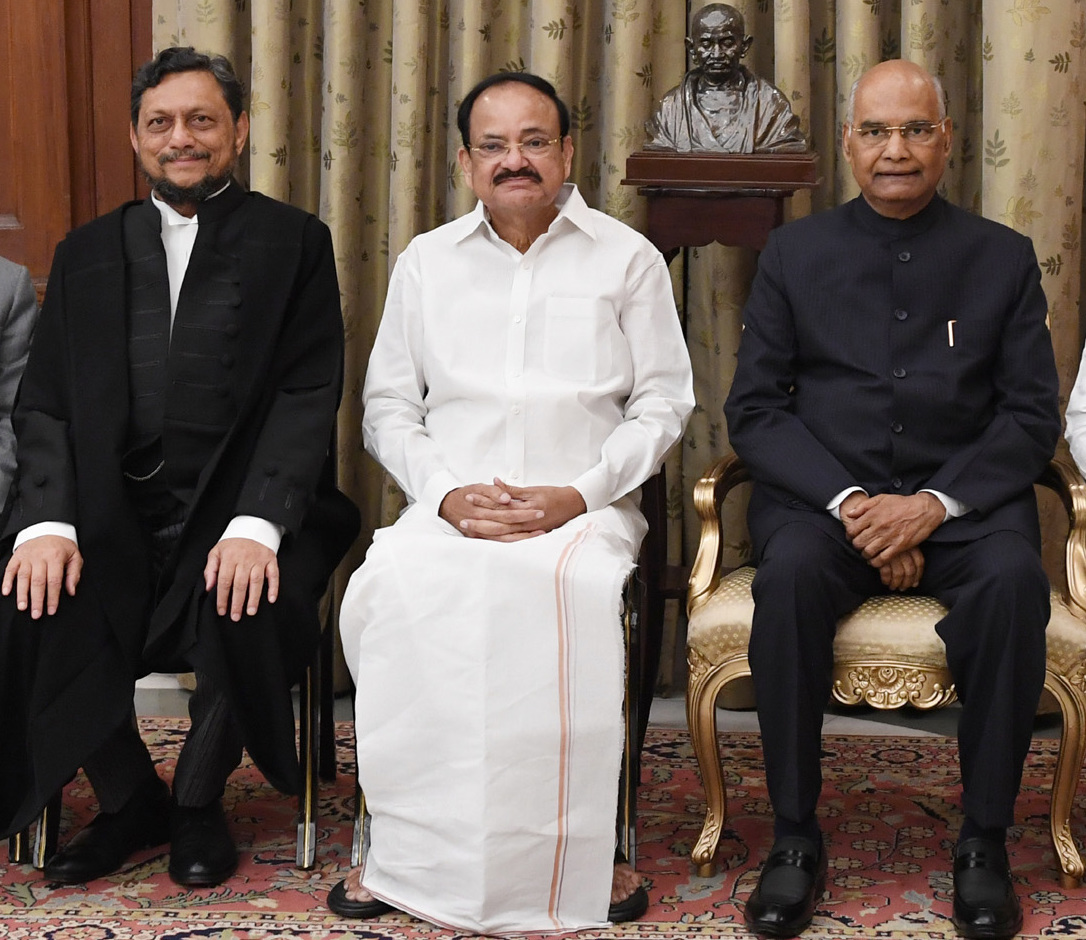
Chief Justice Bobde (left), Vice President Venkaiah Naidu (Center) and President Kovind (right) at the swearing-in ceremony of Sharad Arvind Bobde

== Addresses to the parliament ==
=== Upon taking the oath ===
Presidential styles of Ram Nath Kovind
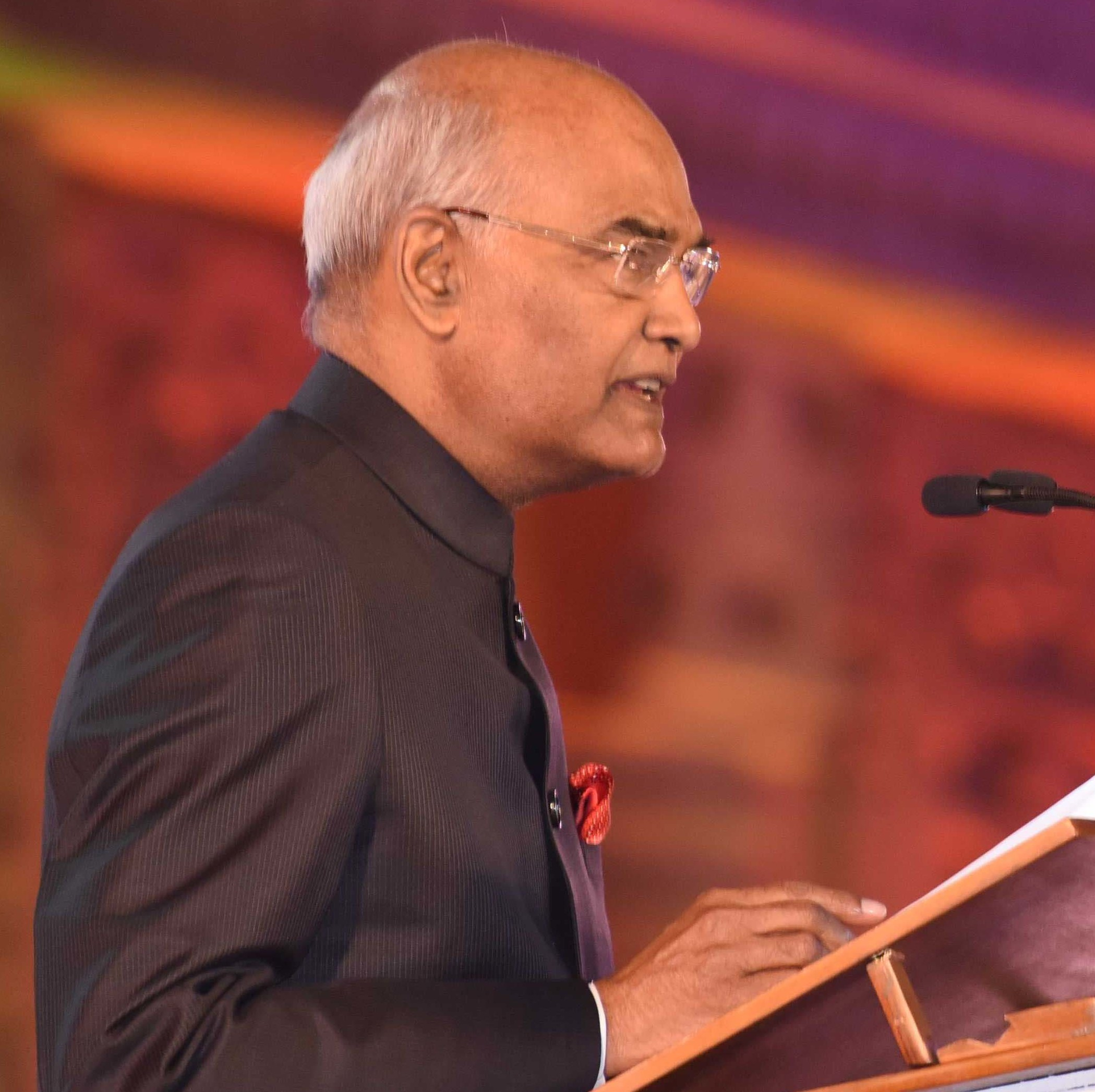
- Reference style: Hon'ble President Shri Ram Nath Kovind (within India)
- Spoken style: Ram Nath Kovind
- Alternative style: Mr. President

On 25 July 2017, the recently sworn in President Ram Nath Kovind addressed the gathering with his inaugural speech in Hindi. He pledged to protect the Constitution and said the key to India's success and fraternity is 'unity in diversity'. He cherished the ideas of Mahatma Gandhi and his contribution to the independence of India, and his thousands of supporters. He appreciated the work and dedication of former President Pranab Mukherjee, and assured citizens of his promise to stay true to the trust they had bestowed on him.

=== Joint sitting of the two houses of parliament, 2018 ===
On 29 January 2018, President Kovind addressed the joint sitting of two houses of Parliament. He appreciated the schemes and initiatives taken by the government, spoke in favor of Jan Dhan Yojana (Prime Minister's People's Wealth Scheme), Beti Bachao Beti Padhao Yojana (Save the girl child, educate the girl child) and Pradhan Mantri Ujjwala Yojana (Prime Minister's Lighting Scheme). He also thanked UNESCO for including Kumbh Mela on its Intangible Cultural Heritage List and appreciated the efforts of the Indian Space Research Organisation (ISRO) launching 104 satellites in one launch.

=== Joint sitting of the two houses of parliament, 2019 ===
On 31 January 2019, President Kovind addressed the joint sitting of the two houses of Parliament. It was the 150th anniversary year of Mahatma Gandhi's birth. It also marked the centenary of the Jallianwala Bagh massacre. He paid tribute to all those martyrs who sacrificed their lives hoping to bring a bright future to the Indian people.

=== Joint sitting of the two houses of parliament, 2020 ===
On 31 January 2020, President Kovind addressed the joint sitting of the two houses of Parliament. Upon entering the third decade of 21st century, he wished for the protection of the rights of every citizen. Upon the abrogation of Articles 370 and 35-A of the Constitution of India, he congratulated the government and said that the seven decade-old dream of Syama Mukherjee had been fulfilled by the efforts of government. He said the steps the government had taken paved the way for the equitable development of Jammu-Kashmir and Ladakh.

=== Joint sitting of the two houses of parliament, 2021 ===
On 29 January 2021, the joint sitting of Parliament was held during the COVID-19 pandemic in India. India was also entering her 75th year of Independence. President Kovind praised the government's timely efforts to declare lock-downs in the country, to save the lives of the people. He advised citizens to follow all the safety measures against COVID-19, and mentioned the rapid decline in number of cases.

== Foreign affairs ==
=== State visits of president ===
==== Djibouti and Ethiopia ====
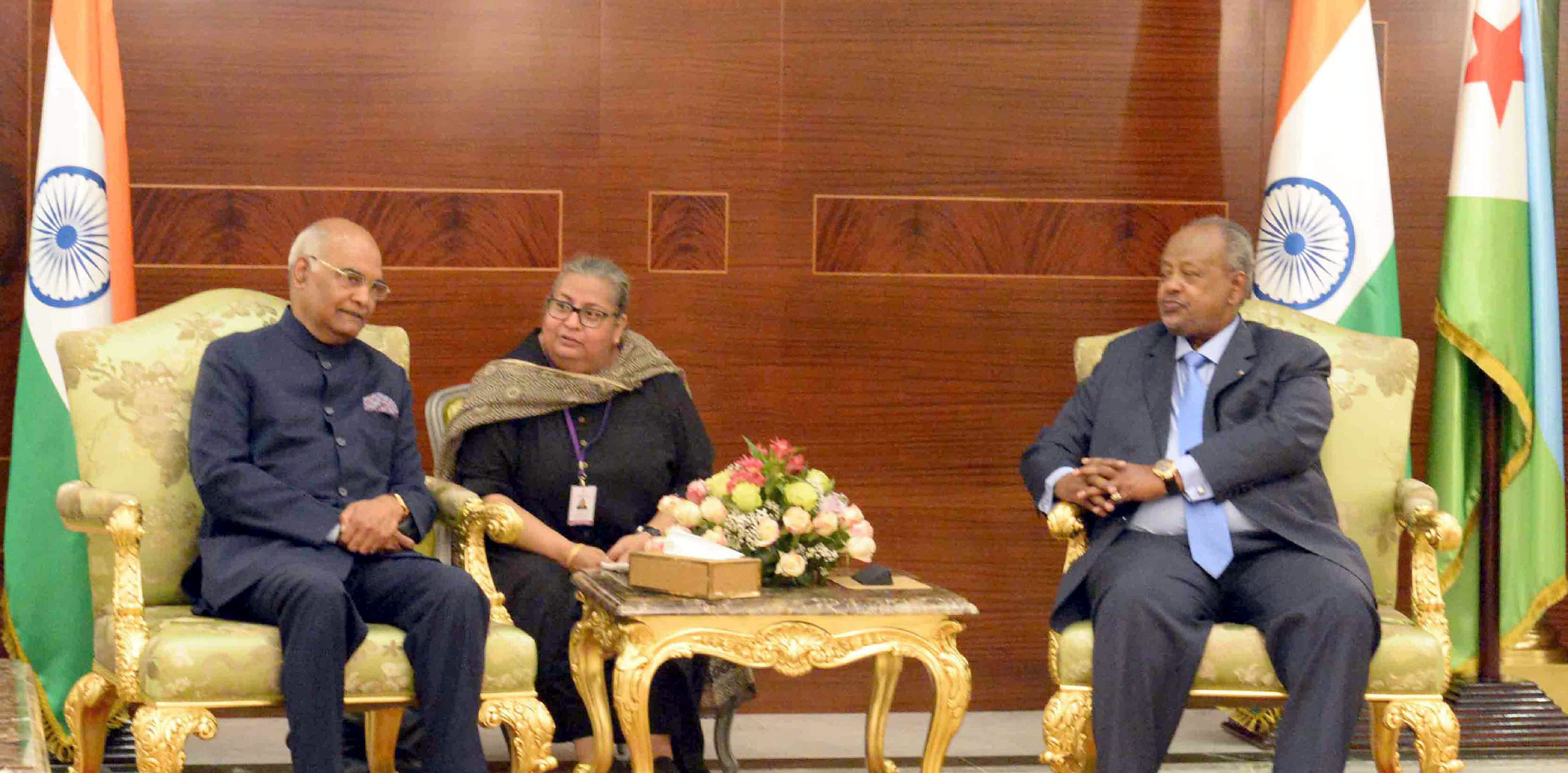
President Kovind in Djibouti with President Ismail Omar Guelleh

President Kovind visited Djibouti and Ethiopia from 3 to 6 October 2017. It was significant as India was trying to establish its presence in Africa. The two countries signed an agreement to establish regular India-Djibouti Foreign Office level consultations. He granted assistance of $600 million that included an India-Africa Development Fund of $100 million and an India-Africa Health Fund of $10 million. His visit was the first by an Indian president to Ethiopia in 45 years after President V. V. Giri's trip in 1972. As Ethiopian capital Addis Ababa is the seat of the African Union, he interacted with the Indian community and delivered a speech at the University of Addis Ababa. He had bilateral talks with President Ismail Omar Gulleh and signed an agreement and memorandum of understanding on institutionalization of foreign office consultation and greater economic cooperation with Ethiopia.

==== Mauritius and Madagascar ====
From 11 to 15 March 2018, President Kovind visited Mauritius and Madagascar. He was the chief guest at the celebrations commemorating the 50th year of Mauritius' independence. He held delegation-level talks with Prime Minister Pravind Jugnauth. The president also signed agreements and memoranda of understanding between India and Mauritius. He inaugurated the World Hindi Secretariat building as well as laid foundation stones for two important India-aided projects—a social housing scheme and a hospital.

The agreements exchanged were on cooperation between Nalanda University in Bihar and Mauritius. Union Minister Ashwini Kumar Choubey, Delhi Member of Parliament Manoj Tiwari, Hukumdev Narayan Yadav and other officials accompanied him. In Madagascar, Prime Minister Olivier Solonandrasan received him at the Ivato International Airport, Antananarivo. He was conferred the Grand Cross of the Second Class by the president of Madagascar, Hery Rajaonarimampianina, the highest honor Madagascar confers on a non-citizen. He inaugurated the Center for Geo-informatics Applications in Rural Development, interacted with members of the India-Madagascar Business Forum, and addressed students and the academic community at the University of Antananarivo.

==== Equatorial Guinea, Swaziland and Zambia ====
President Kovind visited Equatorial Guinea, Swaziland and Zambia during his state visit to Africa from 7 to 12 April 2018. He signed three memoranda of understanding in the fields of AYUSH (ayurveda, yoga, naturopathy, Unani, Siddha, Sowa-Rigpa and homoeopathy) and traditional medicine, medicinal plants, and an action plan for Information and Communication Technology. He was bestowed with the medal of the Gran Colar de la Independencia by President Teodoro Obiang Nguema Mbasogo, for his contribution to the cause of development, security and world peace. He said that India is ready to partner with Equatorial Guinea, which is diversifying its economy and reducing its dependence on oil and gas exports.

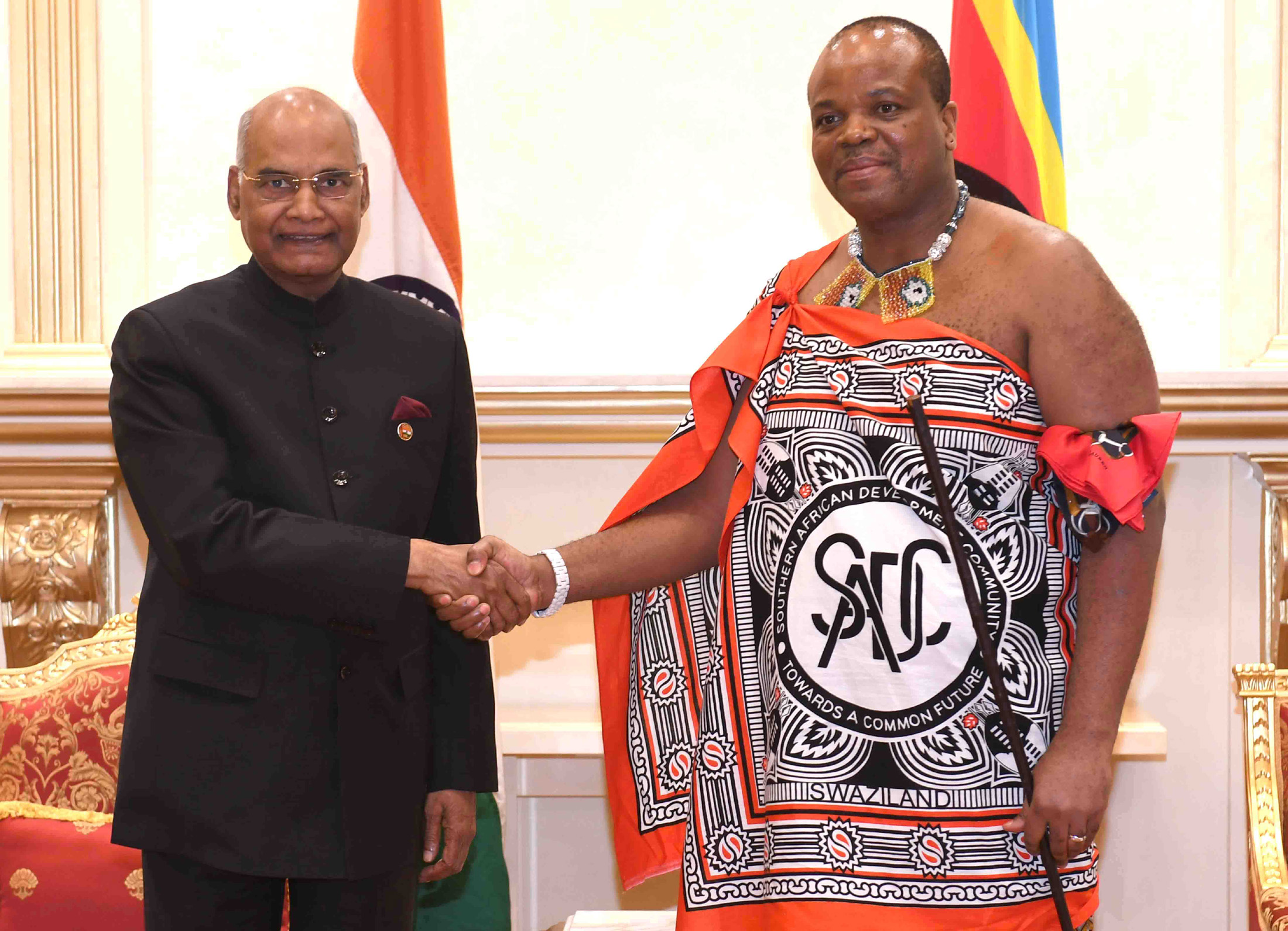
President Kovind in Swaziland with King of Swaziland, His Majesty Mswati III

In Swaziland, he addressed members of the Parliament of Swaziland on 10 April 2018. He became the first visiting head of state to do so. He met King Mswati III and was conferred the highest honor of Swaziland, the Order of the Lion. While addressing the Indian community in Malabo, the president said every member of the Indian community is critical to strengthening relations between India and Equatorial Guinea. He also urged the Indian community to help enhance the business and cultural links between the two countries.

He visited Zambia at the invitation of President Edgar Chagwa Lungu. This was the final leg of his three-nation tour to Africa. He paid tribute to three former presidents of Zambia, Chiluba, Mwanawasa and Sata at the Embassy Park Presidential Memorial. He signed agreements and memoranda of understanding including visa exemption on diplomatic and official passports, judicial cooperation which would result in long and short-term training in law and justice developments and the establishment of the Entrepreneurship Development Institute in Zambia.

==== Greece, Suriname and Cuba ====
From 16 to 19 June 2018, President Kovind visited Greece on the first leg of his three-nation State Visit to Greece, Suriname and Cuba. He visited the sites of historical and archaeological importance, addressed the Indian community and Greek Indologists at the Grande Bretagne hotel, laid a wreath to the Unknown Soldier's Monument, met with Greek Prime Minister Alexis Tsipras and visited the premises of the child welfare organization The Smile of the Child. President Kovind addressed the India–Greece Business Forum and said that there is immense potential to take the economic ties between India and Greece to a higher level.

During his visit to Suriname, he met President Desi Bouterse and discussed issues of bilateral concern; both men signed bilateral agreements and memoranda of understanding. They paid tribute at the statue of Father of the Nation of India, Mahatma Gandhi in Paramaribo, Surinam's capital city. President Kovind performed yoga along with the president of Suriname on the International Day of Yoga. Kovind delivered an address in Suriname assembly and said that India will extend a line of credit of $27.5 Million to support a power transmission project in Pikin Saron.

He visited Cuba, marking the first visit by an Indian leader to the Caribbean island in more than six decades. He spoke on the issue of global cooperation and stressed the importance of South-South cooperation. He held wide-ranging talks with Cuban President Miguel Diaz-Canel to further cement the strong bilateral ties. He also addressed the University of Havana on the topic 'India and the Global South'. During his address, President Kovind stressed the need for India and Cuba to work together to push for greater space for developing countries in global governance structures.

==== Cyprus, Bulgaria and Czech Republic ====
President Kovind visited Cyprus from 2 to 4 September 2018, on the first leg of his three-nation visit to Europe to continue India's high-level engagements with European countries. The president and his wife arrived at the Larnaca International Airport in Cyprus. The Minister of State for Agriculture and Farmers Welfare Parshottam Rupala and two members of parliament, Ram Shakal and Anil Baluni, along with several other officials accompanied him. President Kovind addressed an Extraordinary Session of the House of Representatives of Cyprus, delivered a lecture at the University of Cyprus, and addressed members of the Indian diaspora. He aimed to further strengthen trade and business relations and improve people to people contact.

During his visit to Bulgaria, he held detailed talks with President Rumen Radev and invited Bulgaria to become a key partner of India in defense and in the IT sector under the Make In India program. He signed four memoranda of understanding between on investment, tourism, civil nuclear cooperation and the establishment of a Hindi Chair at Sofia University. A Program of Cooperation was also signed to enhance scientific cooperation.

In the Czech Republic, the president met Bulgarian Prime Minister Boyko Borissov. He inaugurated a statue of Mahatma Gandhi. He presented a copy of Gandhi's book to the president of Bulgaria. Both countries called for reform of the UN Security Council. Bulgaria expressed its support for India's bid for permanent membership on the council. He invited a Czech defense company to take advantage of the opening of the defense manufacturing sector in India to set-up joint ventures in India. He also addressed the Czech-Indian Business Forum in Prague.

==== Tajikistan ====
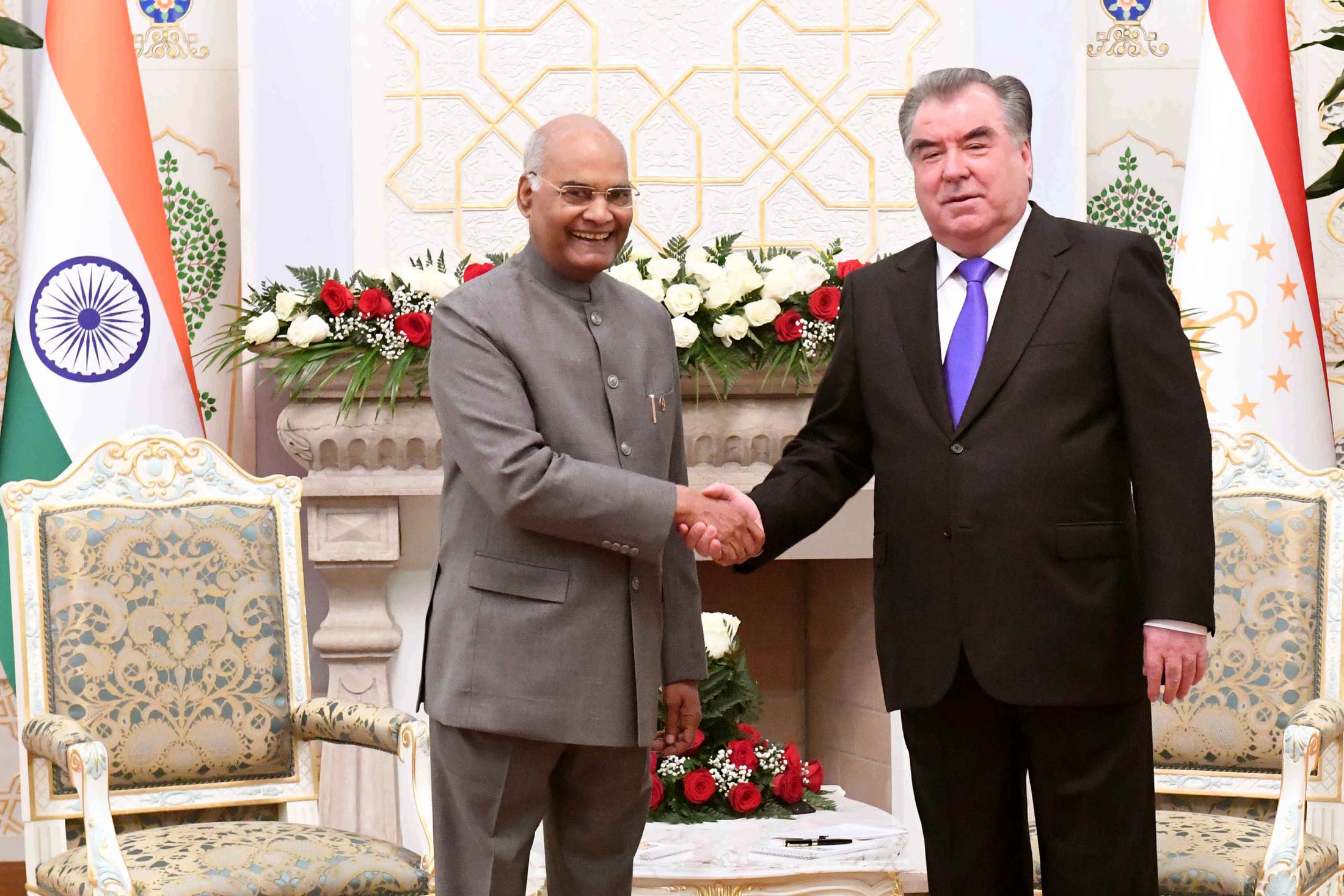
President Kovind in Tajikistan with President Emomali Rahmon

From 7 to 9 October 2018, President Kovind visited Tajikistan. He addressed members of the Indian community at a reception hosted by Somnath Ghosh, the Indian ambassador to Tajikistan in Dushanbe. He met President Emomali Rahmon and visited the Tajik National University where he delivered an address on 'Countering Radicalization: Challenges in Modern Societies'. He paid his respects to Mahatma Gandhi and Rabindranath Tagore by visiting their memorials. Areas of bilateral, regional and multilateral cooperation were discussed. He said that the two nations will promote the International North-South Transport Corridor and other connectivity initiatives such as the development of Chabahar Port and the Ashgabat Agreement for smooth transport of goods.

==== Vietnam and Australia ====
President Kovind visited Vietnam from 18 to 21 November 2018, on the first leg of his visit to Vietnam and Australia. This was his first visit to an ASEAN country. He visited Da Nang, Me Son, Hanoi and Ho Chi Minh. He addressed the National Assembly of Vietnam, the second foreign leader to do so after Chinese President Xi Jinping. President Kovind and President Nguyen Phu Trong discussed all aspects of their country's bilateral relations, and exchanged views on regional and international issues of mutual interest. President Kovind congratulated the Vietnamese president on his election as state president by the National Assembly.

While in Australia, India and Australia signed five agreements to boost investments and enhance cooperation. They included pacts on delivering services to people with disabilities and fostering scientific collaboration and innovation. Other agreements included cooperation in agricultural research and education, and a joint PhD agreement between the Indraprastha Institute of Information Technology in Delhi and the Queensland University of Technology in Brisbane. Other actions included the expansion of the Australia-India Mining Partnership at the Indian School of Mines, connecting Australian companies to India's mineral-rich northeastern states. Minister of State for Skill Development and Entrepreneurship, Anant Kumar Hegde, members of parliament and senior officials of the Government of India accompanied Kovind. This was the first-ever visit of a president of India to Australia.

==== Myanmar ====
From 10 to 14 December 2018, President Kovind visited Myanmar. He visited the Advanced Center for Agricultural Research, Education and the Rice Bio-park and also the shrine of Bahadur Shah Zafar in Yangoon. He discussed several issues including the issue of 'Rohingyas' and the trilateral highway connecting India-Myanmar-Thailand.

==== Croatia, Bolivia and Chile ====
Kovind paid a State visit to Croatia, Bolivia and Chile from 25 March – 1 April 2019. He was honored with Croatia's highest civilian award, The Grand Order of the King Tomislav. He talked with the leaders of Croatia to strengthen ties in key sectors such as trade, investment and renewable energy. He held delegation-level talks with Bolivian president Evo Morales during the visit. He also participated in an India-Bolivia business meeting, addressed university students, and interacted with Indian community members during his stay. He aimed to strengthen ties in key sectors such as trade, investment and renewable energy in Chile.

==== Benin, Gambia and Guinea ====
President Kovind visited Benin, Gambia and Guinea from 28 to 3 July August. In Benin, he held various discussions with Patrice Talon, president of Benin, and addressed the National Assembly in Porto Novo. While in Gambia, he addressed a special session of the National Assembly of Gambia. During his visit to Guinea, he was conferred with the National Order of Merit, the highest award of Guinea.

==== Iceland, Switzerland and Slovenia ====
From 9 to 17 September 2019, President Kovind visited Iceland, Switzerland and Slovenia. After discussions between leaders of both countries, India and Iceland signed memoranda of understanding and agreements on fishery, the marine economy, shipping, green growth, energy, construction and the agriculture sector. In Switzerland, President Kovind addressed the Indian community and the University of Bern on the theme 'India-Switzerland new age partnership connecting Himalayas with Alps'. In Slovenia, he held bilateral talks with President Borut Pahor in the capital, Ljubljana. India and Slovenia signed and exchanged seven memorandum of understanding.

==== Philippines and Japan ====
Kovind visited the Philippines and Japan from 17 to 23 October. There, President Kovind and the Philippines' President Rodrigo Duterte had discussions on bilateral issues and international terrorism. He attended the enthronement ceremony of Emperor Naruhito in Japan. This was the first presidential visit to Japan by India in 29 years. The last presidential visit was in 1990 by then-President Ramaswamy Venkatraman. He participated in the foundation ceremony of Sino Soto and also visited a Buddhist Temple in Tokyo to plant a Bodhi tree as well as travel to the city of Kakegawa.
