= Kantilal Desai =

Kantilal Desai may refer to:

- Kantilal Ranchhodji Desai (1932–2016), an Indian cricketer
- Kantilal Thakoredas Desai (1903–1977), the second Chief Justice of the High Court of Gujarat
