= Vineet Kothari =

Former Acting Chief Justice of Gujarat High Court

Hon'ble Dr. Acting Chief Justice (Retd.) Vineet Kothari

Acting Chief Justice of Gujarat High Court
- In office 31 August 2021 – 1 September 2021
- Appointed by: Ram Nath Kovind

Judge of Gujarat High Court
- In office 4 January 2021 – 30 August 2021
- Nominated by: Sharad Arvind Bobde
- Appointed by: Ram Nath Kovind

Judge of Madras High Court
- In office 23 November 2018 – 3 January 2021
- Nominated by: Ranjan Gogoi
- Appointed by: Ram Nath Kovind

Judge of Karnataka High Court
- In office 18 April 2016 – 22 November 2018
- Nominated by: T. S. Thakur
- Appointed by: Pranab Mukherjee

Judge of Rajasthan High Court
- In office 13 June 2005 – 17 April 2016
- Nominated by: Ramesh Chandra Lahoti
- Appointed by: A. P. J. Abdul Kalam

Personal details
- Born: 2 September 1959 (age 67)
- Education: University of Jodhpur

Justice Vineet Kothari (born 2 September 1959) is an Indian former judge who is now a designated Senior Advocate practising at the Supreme Court of India . He is former Acting Chief Justice of Gujarat High Court and former Judge of Madras High Court, Karnataka High Court and Rajasthan High Court.

== Career ==
He was born in a Jain family of chartered accountants. He completed his B.Com.(Hons.) from Jodhpur University in 1978. After practising as a chartered accountant for 26 years, he served with distinction on the Income Tax Appellate Tribunal for 15 years from 1989 to 2004. He was not the member of income tax appellate tribunal rather his elder brother Mr. B M kothari was member of income tax appellate tribunal.

He was elevated as Judge of Rajasthan High Court on 13 June 2005. Transferred as Judge of Karnataka High Court on 18 April 2016. Transferred as Judge of Madras High Court on 23 November 2018. Transferred as Judge of Gujarat High Court on 4 January 2021. Appointed as Acting Chief Justice of Gujarat High Court on 31 August 2021 consequent upon the appointment of Justice Vikram Nath as a Judge of Supreme Court of India. He was retired on 1 September 2021.
