= Jaishanker Manilal Shelat =

Former judge of Supreme Court of India (1966-1973)

Hon'ble Mr. Justice (Retd.) Jaishanker Manilal Shelat

Judge of Supreme Court of India
- In office 24 February 1966 – 30 April 1973
- Nominated by: P. B. Gajendragadkar
- Appointed by: S. Radhakrishnan

3rd Chief Justice of Gujarat High Court
- In office 31 May 1963 – 24 February 1966
- Nominated by: B. P. Sinha
- Appointed by: S. Radhakrishnan
- Preceded by: K. T. Desai
- Succeeded by: N. M. Miabhoy

Judge of Gujarat High Court
- In office 1 May 1960 – 30 May 1963; Acting CJ : 23 May 1963 - 30 May 1963
- Appointed by: Rajendra Prasad

Judge of Bombay High Court
- In office 6 January 1957 – 30 April 1960
- Appointed by: Rajendra Prasad

Personal details
- Born: 16 July 1908
- Died: 1 November 1985 (aged 77)
- Education: Institute of Historical Research, King's College London, Elphinstone College

Jaishanker Manilal Shelat (16 July 1908 – 1 November 1985) was a judge of the Supreme Court of India from February 1966 to April 1973. Before that, he served as the third Chief Justice of the High Court of Gujarat from May 1963 till his elevation to the Supreme Court.

== Education ==
Shelat initially studied at Jubilee Institution in Umreth. He got his Bachelor of Arts (Honours) in English literature from Elphinstone College, Bombay. Later, he went to King's College and the Institute of Historical Research of the University of London where he submitted his thesis on "Criticism and defence of the constitution of the Senate of the United States of America during the campaign for ratification 1787-1789."

== Career ==
He joined the Bar at Inner Temple in 1933 and shifted to India soon after. Shelat became a Judge at the Bombay City Civil Court and an Additional Sessions Judge for Greater Bombay in September 1948. He was appointed an Additional Judge of the High Court of Bombay in January 1957 and made a Permanent Judge of the court in November that year. He was transferred to Gujarat High Court, upon its creation, on 1 May 1960 and became its Chief Justice on 31 May 1963 after briefly serving as its acting chief justice. He was elevated to Supreme Court of India on 24 February 1966 and resigned on 30 April 1973.

=== Supersession and resignation ===
In April 1973, Shelat was the seniormost Supreme Court judge followed by A. N. Grover and K. S. Hegde who were superseded by Justice A. N. Ray in being named as the Chief Justice of India. This is partly attributed to their being on the side of the majority judgement in Kesavananda Bharati v. State of Kerala which went against the government of the day. Both Hegde and Shelat resigned from the court at the end of that month while Grover did so a month later.

== Works ==
- Akbar. Bombay: Bharatiya Vidya Bhavan. 1964. pp. viii+396.
- Secularism, Principles and Application. Bombay: N. M. Tripathi Private Ltd. 1972. pp. xiv+144.
