= Aravind Kumar =

Judge of the Supreme Court of India

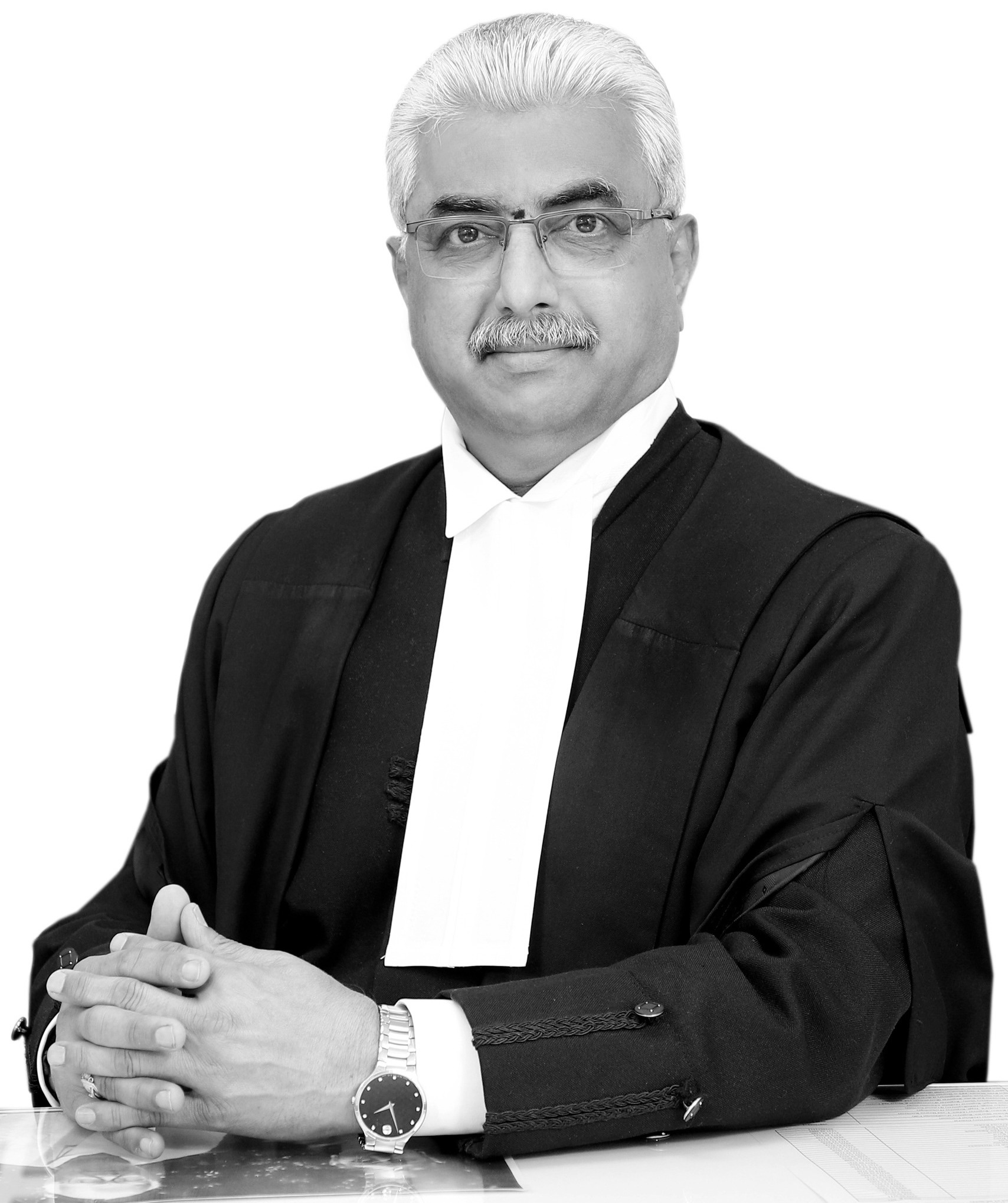

Judge of the Supreme Court of India
- Incumbent
- Assumed office 13 February 2023
- Nominated by: Dhananjaya Y. Chandrachud
- Appointed by: Droupadi Murmu

26th Chief Justice of the Gujarat High Court
- In office 13 October 2021 – 12 February 2023
- Nominated by: N. V. Ramana
- Appointed by: Ram Nath Kovind
- Preceded by: Vikram Nath
- Succeeded by: Sonia Gokani

Judge of the Karnataka High Court
- In office 26 June 2009 – 12 October 2021
- Nominated by: K. G. Balakrishnan
- Appointed by: Pratibha Patil

Personal details
- Born: 14 July 1962 (age 63)

Aravind Kumar (born 14 July 1962) is a judge of the Supreme Court of India. He is a former chief justice of the Gujarat High Court and former judge of the Karnataka High Court.

== Early life and education ==
Aravind Kumar was born in Karnataka on 14 July 1962. He did his schooling and college at Bengaluru and studied degree at National College and completed L.L.B. from V.V. Puram College in Bangalore. During student days, was active as a students union leader and was Vice President of Bangalore University Students Action Committee. He enrolled as an advocate in 1987.

== As Advocate ==
Kumar was an advocate for about 4 years. From 1991 onwards, he shifted to practising independently at the Karnataka High Court. In 1999, he was appointed as Additional Central Government Standing Counsel at the Karnataka High Court. In 2002 he became a Standing Counsel for the Income Tax Department and a member of the Regional Direct Taxes Advisory Committee.

He became the Assistant Solicitor General of India in 2005. He has conducted cases covering Constitution of India, Central Excise Act, Customs Act, Code of Civil Procedure, Criminal Procedure Code, and others. He had also conducted number of Election Petitions pertaining to Assembly & Parliamentary Constituencies and also been practicing on Taxation side as Standing Counsel of Income Tax Department for 11 years.

He served as a Legal Advisor to various Statutory Corporations and Companies.

He was one of the founder members of Lahari Advocates Forum which is an organization promoted by distinguished Senior Advocates for promoting legal education, training young Advocates, conducting workshops on various subjects for Advocates, conducting orientation courses to young Advocates seeking appointment as Judicial Officers and also served as its Vice President.

He was Special Public Prosecutor for CBI till elevation.

== As Judge ==
In 2009, Justice Kumar was appointed as an Additional Judge to the Karnataka HC and took oath of office on 26 June 2009. He became a Permanent Judge with effect from 7 December 2012. As a judge at the Karnataka HC, Justice Kumar served as the Executive Chairman of the Karnataka State Legal Services Authority.

Kumar was appointed as 26th Chief Justice of the Gujarat HC in October 2021 upon elevation of the then chief justice Vikram Nath to supreme court in August that year. He took oath of office as Chief Justice on 13 October 2021 and had been discharging duties till 12 February 2023.

Kumar was recommended by Supreme Court Collegium to be appointed as judge in supreme court on 31 January 2023. Central Government cleared his appointment on 10 February 2023. Subsequently he took oath as judge of supreme court on 13 February 2023. He is due to retire from Supreme Court on 13 July 2027.
