= Manash Ranjan Pathak =

Indian judge (born 1965)

Hon'ble Justice Manash Ranjan Pathak

29th Chief Justice of Gujarat High Court
- Nominee
- Assuming office TBD
- Nominated by: Surya Kant
- Succeeding: Sunita Agarwal

Judge of Gujarat High Court
- Incumbent
- Assumed office 14 September 2026; Acting CJ : 6 October 2026 – Incumbent
- Nominated by: Surya Kant
- Appointed by: Droupadi Murmu

Judge of Orissa High Court
- In office 21 July 2025 – 13 September 2026
- Nominated by: B. R. Gavai
- Appointed by: Droupadi Murmu

Judge of Gauhati High Court
- In office 22 May 2013 – 20 July 2025
- Nominated by: Altamas Kabir
- Appointed by: Pranab Mukherjee

Personal details
- Born: 28 August 1965 (age 61) Guwahati, Assam
- Education: Bangalore University (B.A.), Guwahati University (LL.B)

Manash Ranjan Pathak (born 28 August 1965) is an Indian juris, who is currently serving as acting chief justice of Gujarat High Court. He previously served as a judge of the High Court of Gauhati and Orissa.

== Early life and career ==
Pathak was born on 28 August 1965 at Guwahati, Assam. He received his early education at Haripriya Vidyapeeth, Kumarpara, and his middle schooling at M.C.M.E. School, Uzanbazar. He subsequently studied at Kendriya Vidyalaya, Ambari, and completed his Higher Secondary education at Kendriya Vidyalaya, Khanapara, Guwahati. He graduated in Arts from St. Joseph's College, Bangalore, under Bangalore University, and thereafter obtained his LL.B. degree from the then Government Law College, Panbazar, Guwahati, under Gauhati University.

He enrolled as an Advocate with the Bar Council of Assam, Nagaland, Meghalaya, Manipur, Tripura, Mizoram and Arunachal Pradesh on 12 September 1990. During his practice at the Gauhati High Court, he primarily dealt with civil, constitutional, land acquisition and service matters. He have extensive experience as counsel for government and public institutions. He served as Standing Counsel for the State of Tripura from 2004 until the bifurcation of the High Court. He was also Standing Counsel for the Education Department of the Government of Assam from February 2005 and Standing Counsel of the Gauhati High Court. He also served as member of the Assam Law Commission and Indian Law Institute.

== Judicial career ==
Pathak was elevated as an Additional Judge of the Gauhati High Court on 22 May 2013 and was made permanent on12 November 2018. After more than twelve years on the Gauhati High Court Bench, he was transferred to the High Court of Orissa. He assumed office there on 21 July 2025 and served as a judge of that court until September 2026. He was subsequently transferred to the Gujarat High Court and assumed charge as a judge on 14 September 2026.

After elevation of Chief Justice of Gujarat, Sunita Agarwal to Supreme Court of India on 6 October 2026, Pathak was appointed as acting chief justice of Gujarat High Court. On 26 October 2026, Supreme Court collegium recommended his appointment as permanent chief justice of Gujarat High Court.
