= R. A. Mehta =

Indian judge (born 1936)

R.A. Mehta
- Born: 1936 (age 89–90); Maliya, Gujarat, British India
- Occupation: Judge
- Known for: Gujarat High Court

Rameshchandra Amrut Mehta (born 1936) is a retired justice of the Gujarat High Court. During his fourteen-year tenure in the Gujarat High Court, he came to be known for his probity and sympathy for the poor. Following the 1979 Morvi dam failure, the worst flood disaster in Independent India, he assisted Justice BK Mehta commission in the investigations.

== Judicial career ==
He was appointed to the Gujarat High Court in 1983. Among his significant judgments of this period were the abolition of carrying of night soil on head by low-caste menials, and the regularisation of street hawkers in Ahmedabad. In the Golana massacre case, in which four Dalits were killed by upper-caste Darbars (Rajputs), eleven of whom were sentenced to life, he gave guidelines for the government and police to follow in case of caste and communal tensions. He was also responsible for modernization and computerization of the Gujarat High Court.

== Controversy ==
=== Lokayukta of Gujarat ===
In June 2011, the Chief Justice of the Gujarat High Court suggested his name as the Lokayukta of Gujarat, a critical anti-corruption post that had been lying vacant for seven years. However, the government of Gujarat dragged its feet on formalizing his appointment. In August 2011, responding to a Public Interest Litigation petition filed by the father of the murdered RTI-activist Amit Jethwa, the High Court issued a show-cause notice to the government on the delay in appointment. Eventually, the governor herself made the appointment, bypassing the government, leading to much constitutional debate.

The Narendra Modi government contested the validity of his appointment without their approval and appealed a case in the High Court. On 11 October 2011, a division bench of the Gujarat high Court gave a split verdict, with senior member Justice Akil Kureshi holding Mehta's appointment by the governor as "constitutional and valid" while junior member Sonia Gokani stated that she "differed" with her fellow judge on the conclusion.

However, later in January 2012, the Gujarat High Court upheld the appointment of Justice R.A. Mehta by a majority verdict.

His appointment came at a time of intense popular outburst against corruption in India, and on the 13th day of Anna Hazare's hunger fast against corruption. Justice Mehta is known to be close to Anna, who had stayed with him on a visit to Ahmedabad in May 2011.

The Supreme Court in its verdict in January 2013 upheld the appointment of R A Mehta as state Lokayukta by Governor Kamla Beniwal, saying it was done in consultation with the Chief Justice of the High Court. On 2 April 2013 the Narendra Modi led government passesd a bill in the Gujarat Assembly to overhaul the Lokayukta institution, virtually giving all its powers to the state and rendering it toothless.
