= Nomanbhai Mahmedbhai Miabhoy =

4th Chief Justice of Gujarat High Court, India

Hon'ble Chief Justice (Retd.) Nomanbhai Mahmedbhai Miabhoy

4th Chief Justice of Gujarat High Court
- In office 21 April 1966 – 5 September 1967
- Nominated by: A. K. Sarkar
- Appointed by: S. Radhakrishnan
- Preceded by: J. M. Shelat
- Succeeded by: P. N. Bhagwati

Judge of Gujarat High Court
- In office 1 May 1960 – 20 April 1966; Acting CJ : 24 February 1966 - 20 April 1966
- Appointed by: Rajendra Prasad

Judge of Bombay High Court
- In office 22 March 1957 – 30 April 1960
- Appointed by: Rajendra Prasad

Personal details
- Born: 6 September 1907
- Education: L.A. Shah Law College

Nomanbhai Mahmedbhai Miabhoy (born 6 September 1907) was an Indian judge and Chief Justice of the Gujarat High Court.

== Career ==
Miabhoy passed Law from Sir L. A. Shah Law College and started practice in Ahmedabad in 1929. He also worked as the Honorary Professor in Sir L.A. Shah Law College. He was appointed an Assistant Judge in 1941 and became District Judge of Baroda, Surat and Broach district. In 1957, Miabhoy became an additional judge of the Bombay High Court. In 1960 he was appointed a judge of Gujarat High Court. He was appointed as acting chief justice on 24 February 1966 before being elevated as the permanent Chief Justice of Gujarat High Court on 21 April 1966 and retired on 5 September 1967. He was fifth Vice chancellor of Gujarat University during 1973 to 1974.
