= Bhaskar Bhattacharya =

Indian judge (born 1952)

57th Chief Justice of the Gujarat High Court
- In office 13 September 2011 – 28 September 2014
- Preceded by: S. J. Mukhopadhaya
- Succeeded by: T. S. Thakur

Personal details
- Born: 29 September 1952 (age 74)
- Profession: Judge

Bhaskar Bhattacharya (born 29 September 1952) is an Indian former judge who served as the 57th Chief Justice of the Gujarat High Court from 2012 to 2014.

== Early life and legal career ==
Bhattacharya passed B.Sc. and LL.B. from the Jogesh Chandra Chaudhuri Law College, University of Calcutta. He was enrolled as an advocate on 14 March 1975 and started practice in civil matters in the Calcutta High Court. He became a Senior Advocate in 1994.

Bhattacharya was appointed a permanent judge of the Calcutta High Court on 17 July 1997. He was transferred to the Gujarat High Court on 8 November 2011 and became its Chief Justice on 18 July 2012. He retired on 28 September 2014.
