= Prabodh Dinkarrao Desai =

Indian judge (1930–2004)

Hon'ble Chief Justice (Retd.) Prabodh Dinkarrao Desai

26th Chief Justice of Bombay High Court
- In office 7 January 1991 – 14 December 1992
- Nominated by: Ranganath Misra
- Appointed by: R. Venkataraman
- Preceded by: Chittatosh Mookerjee; S. C. Pratap (acting)
- Succeeded by: M. K. Mukherjee; Sujata Manohar (acting)

25th Chief Justice of Calcutta High Court
- In office 14 November 1988 – 6 January 1991
- Nominated by: R. S. Pathak
- Appointed by: R. Venkataraman
- Preceded by: Debi Singh Tewatia; R. N. Pyne (acting); Manashnath Roy (acting)
- Succeeded by: N. P. Singh

5th Chief Justice of Himachal Pradesh High Court
- In office 23 December 1983 – 13 November 1988
- Nominated by: Y. V. Chandrachud
- Appointed by: Zail Singh
- Preceded by: Vyas Dev Mishra; H. S. Thakur (acting)
- Succeeded by: N. M. Kasliwal; V. K. Mehrotra (acting)

Judge of Gujarat High Court
- In office 19 February 1970 – 22 December 1983
- Nominated by: M. Hidayatullah
- Appointed by: V. V. Giri
- Acting Chief Justice
- In office 15 March 1983 – 27 September 1983
- Appointed by: Zail Singh
- Preceded by: M. P. Thakkar
- Succeeded by: P. Subramanian Poti

Personal details
- Born: 14 December 1930
- Died: 17 May 2004 (aged 73)
- Education: L. L. B.
- Alma mater: St. Xavier's College, Bombay, Government Law College, Bombay

Prabodh Dinkarrao Desai (14 December 1930 – 17 May 2004) or P. D. Desai was a former Chief Justice of several High Courts of India. He also held the additional charge of the Governor of the Indian state of Himachal Pradesh from 8 March 1986 to 16 April 1986.

== Early life ==
Desai was born in 1930. He studied at Nava Dehra Primary School, R.S. Dalal Government High School and Union High School in Bharuch district. He passed from St. Xavier's College, Bombay and University School of Economics and Sociology Bombay. He completed his legal studies from Government Law College, Bombay.

== Career ==
He got enrollment as an Advocate in 1955 and started practice on civil, criminal and constitutional matters. He also worked in the field of taxation, and Company matters in Bombay High Court and High Court of Gujarat at Ahmedabad. On 19 February 1970 Desai was appointed an Additional Judge of the Gujarat High Court. After two years he became a permanent Judge of the same High Court. He was transferred to Himachal Pradesh High Court and joined there as Chief Justice in 1983. He took over the charge of the governor of Himachal Pradesh for a few days in these periods. In January 1988 Desai became the Chief Justice of the Calcutta High Court, thereafter transferred to Bombay High Court in 1991. He retired on 14 December 1992 as the Chief Justice of the Bombay High Court.
