= Kantilal Ranchhodji Desai =

Indian cricketer (1932–2016)

Kantilal Desai
Personal information
- Full name: Kantilal Ranchhodji Desai
- Born: 27 January 1932; Surat, British India
- Died: 23 July 2016 (aged 84); Valsad, India
- Source: ESPNcricinfo, 15 September 2016

Kantilal Ranchhodji Desai (27 January 1932 – 23 July 2016) was an Indian cricketer. He played nineteen first-class cricket matches for Gujarat between 1959 and 1966.
