= D. M. Dharmadhikari =

Devdatta Madhav Dharmadhikari (born 14 August 1940) is the former supreme court judge. He got in the office on 5 March 2002 and was retired on 13 August 2005. He was appointed as the chief justice of Gujarat High Court on 25 January 2000 before this. His father Yashwant Dharmadhikari was also a senior advocate. When Dharmadhikari committee ruled a decision to allocate 613 employees to Andhra Pradesh and 502 to Telangana in the power utility department, the Andhra Pradesh power utilities protested the same and called his report one sided.
