= B. C. Patel =

Indian jurist

Babulal Chandulal Patel

Chief Justice of Delhi High Court
- In office 5 March 2003 – 7 August 2005

Chief Justice of Jammu & Kashmir High Court
- In office 15 May 2002 – 4 March 2003

Judge of Gujarat High Court
- In office 21 June 1990 – 14 May 2002

Personal details
- Born: 7 August 1943 Ahmedabad, Gujarat, India
- Education: B.A. (Hons.), LL.B., M.A.
- Alma mater: Gujarat University
- Occupation: Jurist

Babulal Chandulal Patel (born 7 August 1943) is a retired Indian jurist who served as the Chief Justice of the Delhi High Court from 2003 to 2005 and previously as the Chief Justice of the Jammu & Kashmir High Court.

== Early life and education ==
Babulal Chandulal Patel was born on 7 August 1943 in Ahmedabad, Gujarat. He completed his Bachelor of Arts (Honours) in Economics in 1963 from Gujarat University. In 1967, he obtained his LL.B. degree and a Master of Arts in Economics and Politics from the same university.
