= Bela Trivedi =

Indian judge (born 1960)

Bela Madhurya Trivedi
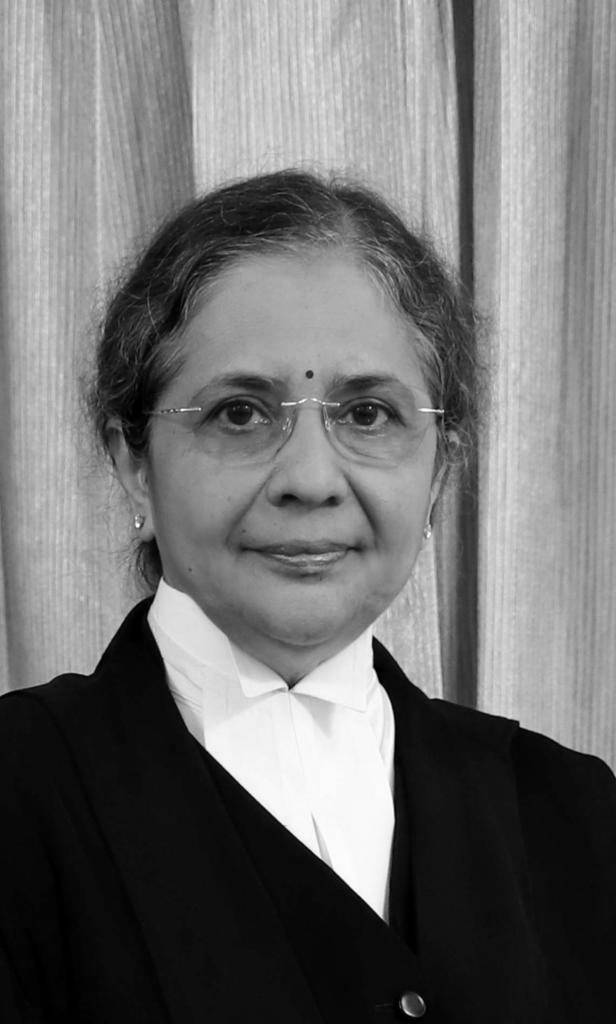

Judge of the Supreme Court of India
- In office 31 August 2021 – 9 June 2025
- Nominated by: N. V. Ramana
- Appointed by: Ram Nath Kovind

Judge of the Gujarat High Court
- In office 9 February 2016 – 30 August 2021
- Nominated by: T. S. Thakur
- Appointed by: Pranab Mukherjee

Judge of the Rajasthan High Court
- In office 27 June 2011 – 8 February 2016
- Nominated by: S. H. Kapadia
- Appointed by: Pratibha Patil

Judge of the Gujarat High Court
- In office 17 February 2011 – 26 June 2011
- Nominated by: S. H. Kapadia
- Appointed by: Pratibha Patil

Personal details
- Born: 10 June 1960 (age 66) Patan, Gujarat
- Education: M. S. University

Bela Madhurya Trivedi (born 10 June 1960) is a former judge of the Supreme Court of India. Before being appointed a judge, she served as the law secretary to Modi Government in Gujarat, when Narendra Modi was the then chief minister. after that she had been a judge of the Gujarat High Court from 2016 to 2021. She formerly served as an additional judge of the Gujarat High Court from 17 February 2011 to 27 June 2011 and later served as the additional judge of the Rajasthan High Court.

== Controversies ==
=== Handling opposition Parties Sensitive Cases ===
Over the past few months, several cases have been reassigned to benches that include Justice Trivedi or others, contrary to regulations. According to the ‘Supreme Court Handbook on Practice and Procedure and Office Procedure’, cases should remain with the senior judge who first received them or a judge who is overseeing a related case."

1. Umar Khalid’s bail plea 2. Petitions challenging provisions of the Unlawful Activities Prevention Act (UAPA)1967 3. A petition connected with the Central Bureau of Investigation’s (CBI) probe in a disproportionate assets case against deputy chief minister of Karnataka D K Shivakumar 4. Supreme Court Denies Bail To AAP Leader Satyendar Jain

=== Senior Advocates on 'Arbitrary' Allocation ===
The issue of reassignment of cases to different bench of the Supreme Court has been flagged by a number of senior lawyers before the CJI. Prashant Bhushan Writes to SC Registrar on 'Arbitrary' Allocation of Cases to Justice Bela M. Trivedi "This case was part heard before Justice AS Bopanna, now the case is listed before Justice Bela Trivedi", Singhvi told CJI asking him to look at the case papers again.

On 7 December 2023, a self-assessment report published by a website 'article-14.com', alleged that there have been irregularities in allocating politically sensitive cases to the bench led by Justice Bela Trivedi.
