= Kantilal Thakoredas Desai =

Indian judge

Hon'ble Chief Justice (Retd.) Kantilal Thakoredas Desai

2nd Chief Justice of Gujarat High Court
- In office 26 January 1961 – 22 May 1963
- Nominated by: B. P. Sinha
- Appointed by: Rajendra Prasad
- Preceded by: Sunderlal Trikamlal Desai
- Succeeded by: Jaishanker Manilal Shelat

Judge of Gujarat High Court
- In office 1 May 1960 – 25 January 1961
- Appointed by: Rajendra Prasad

Judge of Bombay High Court
- In office 1957 – 30 April 1960
- Appointed by: Rajendra Prasad

Personal details
- Born: 1 May 1903
- Died: 29 January 1977 (aged 73)
- Children: Sujata Manohar

Kantilal Thakoredas Desai (1 May 1903 - 29 January 1977) was an Indian judge and the second Chief Justice of the High Court of Gujarat, from January 1961 till May 1963.

== Career ==
Desai studied at Bombay. He enrolled as an Advocate at the High Court of Bombay in 1930. His specialization was in commercial law. He was brought to the Bench of the court in 1957. When the state of Bombay was bifurcated in 1960, Desai was appointed a Judge at the new Gujarat High Court.

== Legacy ==
The Bombay High Court holds an annual "Justice K. T. Desai Memorial Lecture" in his honour. Previous speakers in this series include Ruma Pal, Ashok Desai (2013), Ramesh Chandra Lahoti (2014), Anthony Lester, Baron Lester of Herne Hill (2015) and Rohinton Fali Nariman (2016).

Sujata Manohar, formerly a judge at the Supreme Court of India, is his daughter.
