= Rashmin Manharbhai Chhaya =

Chief Justice of Gauhati High Court

Hon'ble Chief Justice (Retd.) Rashmin Manharbhai Chhaya

Chief Justice of Gauhati High Court
- In office 23 June 2022 – 11 January 2023
- Nominated by: N. V. Ramana
- Appointed by: Ram Nath Kovind

Judge of Gujarat High Court
- In office 17 February 2011 – 22 June 2022
- Nominated by: S. H. Kapadia
- Appointed by: Pratibha Patil

Acting Chief Justice of Gujarat High Court
- In office 2 September 2021 – 12 October 2021
- Appointed by: Ram Nath Kovind

Personal details
- Born: 12 January 1961 (age 65) Veraval, Gujarat, India
- Education: L.A. Shah Law College

Rashmin Manharbhai Chhaya (born 12 January 1961) is a retired Indian judge and a former Chief Justice of Gauhati High Court. He has also been a former judge and acting chief justice of Gujarat High Court.

== Career ==
He was born on 12 January 1961 at Veraval, Gujarat. He did Law at L.A. Shah Law College. He was enrolled as an Advocate in year 1984 with Bar Council of Gujarat. He has served as empaneled Advocate for various Municipal corporations, in Gujarat. He was appointed a Counsel for the Department of Income Tax in year 2001 for a period of two years. He was also appointed Additional Central Government Counsel in year 2004 and Senior Counsel for Union of India in year 2008. He has also appeared in various Constitutional Matters. He was elevated as an Additional Judge of Gujarat High Court on 17 February 2011 and made permanent on 28 January 2013. On 2 September 2021, he was appointed Acting Chief Justice of the Gujarat High Court. He was elevated as Chief Justice of Gauhati High Court on 23 June 2022.
