= Manharlal Pranlal Thakkar =

Hon'ble Mr. Justice (Retd.) Manharlal Pranlal Thakkar

Chairman, 12th Law Commission of India
- In office 1988–1991
- Appointed by: R. Venkataraman
- Prime Minister: Rajiv Gandhi
- Preceded by: D. A. Desai (11th)
- Succeeded by: K. N. Singh (13th)

Judge of Supreme Court of India
- In office 15 March 1983 – 4 November 1988
- Nominated by: Y. V. Chandrachud
- Appointed by: Zail Singh

8th Chief Justice of Gujarat High Court
- In office 20 August 1981 – 14 March 1983
- Nominated by: Y. V. Chandrachud
- Appointed by: Neelam Sanjiva Reddy
- Preceded by: B. J. Divan
- Succeeded by: P. Subramanian Poti; P. D. Desai (acting)

Judge of Gujarat High Court
- In office 2 July 1969 – 19 August 1981
- Nominated by: M. Hidayatullah
- Appointed by: V. V. Giri (Acting President of India)

Personal details
- Born: 4 November 1923 Burma, British India
- Died: Not known
- Education: LL.B
- Alma mater: National High School, Basavanagudi; L.A. Shah Law College

Manharlal Pranlal Thakkar or M. P. Thakkar (born 4 November 1923, date of death unknown) was a judge of the Supreme Court of India, and Chairman of Twelfth Law Commission of India. He also served as 8th Chief Justice of Gujarat High Court from 1981 to 1983.

== Early life ==
Thakkar was born in Burma, British India in 1923. He studied in National High School, Basavanagudi and B.E.T. High School at Rangoon. He passed LL.B from Sir L.A. Shah Law College of Ahmedabad. After his enrolment as an advocate on 10 August 1948, he started practice at the Saurashtra High Court.

== Career ==
Thakkar practised on Civil, Criminal, Income-Tax, Industrial Disputes and Company matters before the then Saurashtra High Court at Rajkot till 1956 and thereafter at Bombay High Court till 1960. He worked in the Gujarat High Court from 1960 to 1963 and was appointed the Judge in City Civil and Sessions Court on 23 January 1963. Thakkar also served as Special Judge for Ahmedabad from March 1969 and was finally elevated as Additional Judge in the Gujarat High Court on 2 July 1969. He became the Permanent Judge of the same High Court on 27 November 1973. Thakkar was elevated to the post of Chief Justice, Gujarat High Court on 20 August 1981. He was appointed a Justice of the Supreme Court of India on 15 March 1983 and served there till his retirement on 4 November 1988.

== Later life ==
After his retirement, Justice Thakkar was appointed Chairman of Twelfth Law Commission of India in 1988. Thakkar is deceased. He was the head of the investigating Thakkar Commission for the Assassination of Indira Gandhi.
