= Anantkumar Surendraray Dave =

Indian judge (1957–2020)

Hon'ble Justice (Retd.) Anantkumar Surendraray Dave

Acting Chief Justice of Gujarat High Court
- In office 14 November 2018 – 8 September 2019
- Appointed by: Ram Nath Kovind

Judge of Gujarat High Court
- In office 8 October 2004 – 4 December 2019
- Nominated by: Ramesh Chandra Lahoti
- Appointed by: A. P. J. Abdul Kalam

Personal details
- Born: 5 December 1957 Panchmahal, Gujarat
- Died: 5 October 2020 (aged 62)

Anant Surendraray Dave (5 December 1957 – 5 October 2020) was an Indian judge who served as Acting Chief Justice as well as judge of the Gujarat High Court.

== Career ==
Dave was born in 1957 in a tribal village of Panchmahal District, Indian state of Gujarat. He completed his primary and secondary education at village schools. He stood First Class in S.S.C. Examination and passed B.Com with LL.B. in First Division. Dave was awarded the coveted M.S. Pandit Gold Medal in the subject of Jurisprudence. On 30 December 1984 he was enrolled as an Advocate in Bar Council of Gujarat High Court. He served as Government Panel lawyer and also worked as Standing Counsel, Additional Government Pleader in the High Court. Dave also appeared in various Tribunals on behalf of the Government of Gujarat. He was elevated in the post of additional Judge of Gujarat High Court on 8 October 2004 and became permanent Judge on 25 September 2006. Justice Dave was appointed as the Acting Chief Justice of High Court of Gujarat on 14 November 2018.

He died on 5 October 2020, aged 62.
