= Ashish Jitendra Desai =

Former Chief Justice of High Court of Kerala

Hon'ble Chief Justice Ashish Jitendra Desai
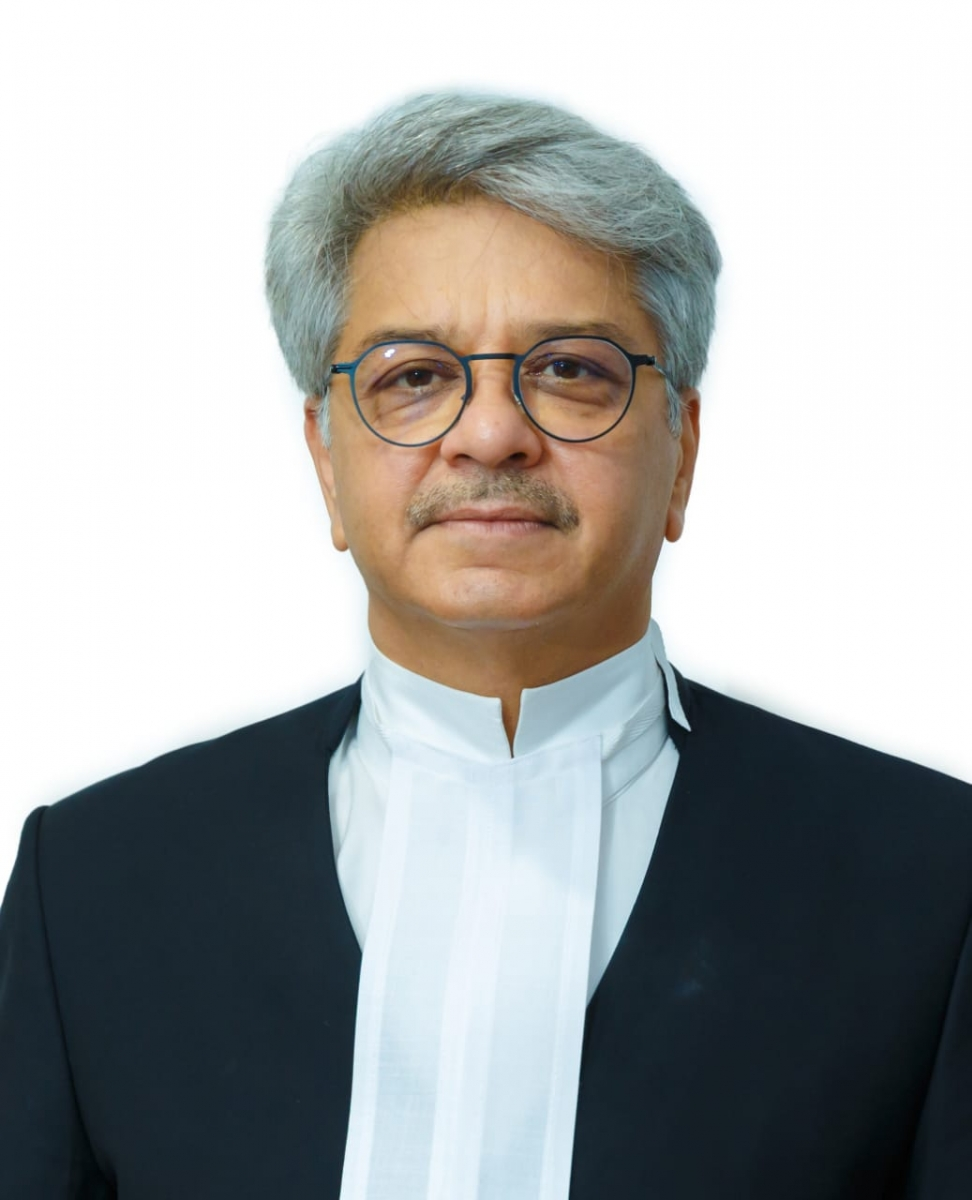

Chief Justice of Kerala High Court
- In office 22 July 2023 – 4 July 2024
- Nominated by: Dhananjaya Y. Chandrachud
- Appointed by: Droupadi Murmu

Acting Chief Justice of Gujarat High Court
- In office 26 February 2023 – 21 July 2023
- Appointed by: Droupadi Murmu

Judge of Gujarat High Court
- In office 21 November 2011 – 25 February 2023
- Nominated by: S. H. Kapadia
- Appointed by: Pratibha Patil

Personal details
- Born: 5 July 1962 (age 63) Vadodara

Ashish Jitendra Desai (born 5 July 1962) is an Indian former judge. He was the Chief Justice of Kerala High Court. He was Acting Chief Justice of Gujarat High Court previously.

== Career ==
Justice Desai obtained an undergraduate degree in economics from St. Xavier's College, Ahmedabad, and law degree from Sir L. A. Shah Law College, Ahmedabad. Initially, he worked at the law office of M. C. Bhatt and D. M. Bhatt. He practiced law first at City Civil and Sessions Court in Ahmedabad, then at Gujarat High Court. He became Additional Judge of High Court of Gujarat in 2011, and was confirmed as permanent judge in 2013.
