= J. N. Bhatt =

Indian judge and lawyer (1945–2022)

J.N. Bhatt (16 October 1945 – 16 April 2022) was an Indian judge who served as Chief Justice of the Patna High Court.

== Career ==
Bhatt was enrolled as an Advocate on 1 August 1968 and worked as Government Pleader at Jamnagar since 1976. He also served as Special Prosecutor and Legal Advisor of Municipal Corporations, Nationalized Banks and in various matters of Armed Forces, Civil, Constitutional and Labour Cases. Bhatt acquired M.Com. LL.M. degree with Gold Medal and Ph.D. in Law. In 1977 he passed Judicial service and became the youngest District Judge of the state. He served as Registrar of Gujarat High Court and was appointed Law Secretary and Remembrancer of the Gujarat State Government. On 21 August 1990 he became the Judge of the Gujarat High Court. Bhatt represented Government of India to the International Law Association Conference, at Warsaw. He became President of the Gujarat State Judicial Academy in May 2002. Bhatt became the Chief Justice of Patna High Court on 18 July 2005 and the First Chancellor of Chanakya National Law University. After his retirement on 16 October 2007, Justice Bhatt was appointed Chairman, Law Commission of Gujarat and Chairperson, Gujarat State Human Rights Commission.
