= Mukesh Shah =

Indian judge (born 1958)

Mukeshkumar Rasikbhai Shah
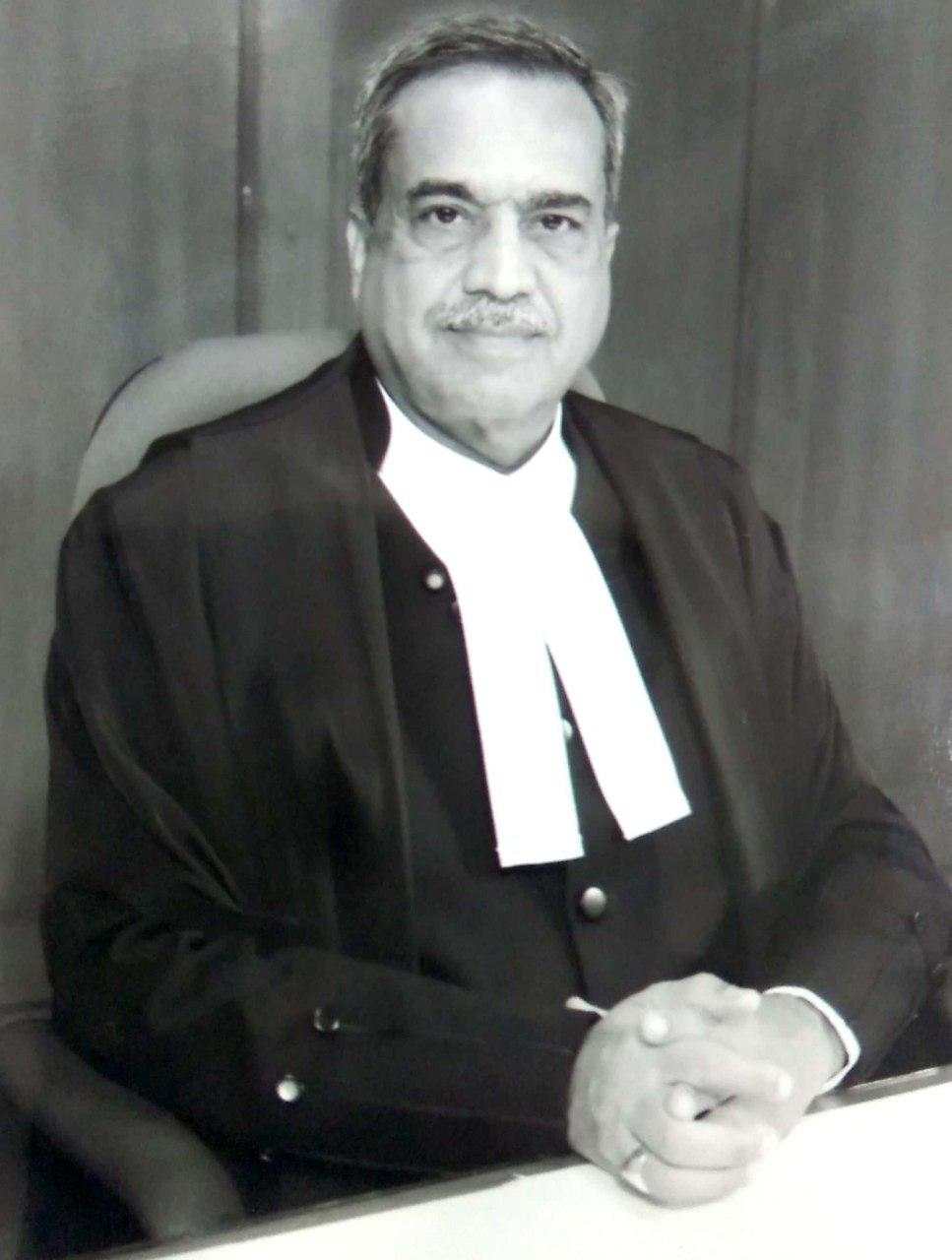

Judge of the Supreme Court of India
- In office 2 November 2018 – 15 May 2023
- Nominated by: Ranjan Gogoi
- Appointed by: Ram Nath Kovind

41st Chief Justice of the Patna High Court
- In office 12 August 2018 – 1 November 2018
- Nominated by: Dipak Misra
- Appointed by: Ram Nath Kovind

Judge of the Gujarat High Court
- In office 7 March 2004 – 11 August 2018
- Nominated by: V. N. Khare
- Appointed by: A. P. J. Abdul Kalam

Personal details
- Born: 16 May 1958 (age 68)
- Education: Gujarat University

Mukeshkumar Rasikbhai Shah (born 16 May 1958) is a former judge of the Supreme Court of India, former chief justice of the Patna High Court and former judge of Gujarat High Court.

== Career ==
Shah was enrolled as an Advocate on 19 July 1982 and practiced in the Gujarat High Court and Central Administrative Tribunal in civil, criminal, constitutional, taxation, labour, service and company matters and specialized in land, constitutional, education, excise, and custom matters. He was appointed as an additional judge of the Gujarat High Court on 7 March 2004 and as permanent judge on 22 June 2005. He was appointed as chief justice of the Patna High Court on 12 August 2018. He was appointed as a judge of Supreme Court of India on 2 November 2018. He retired on 15 May 2023.

He has written more than 700 judgements in four years. He has openly praised the prime minister Narendra Modi. He was a part of many high profile cases.

=== Notable judgements ===
In March 2023, Justice Shah ruled that mere membership of banned organisation constitutes an offence under the Unlawful Activities (Prevention) Act. His comments encouraged petitions on the Love jihad conspiracy theory. He suspended the acquittal of professor GN Saibaba, reversing the Bombay High Court order.
