= Vikram Nath =

Indian judge (born 1962)

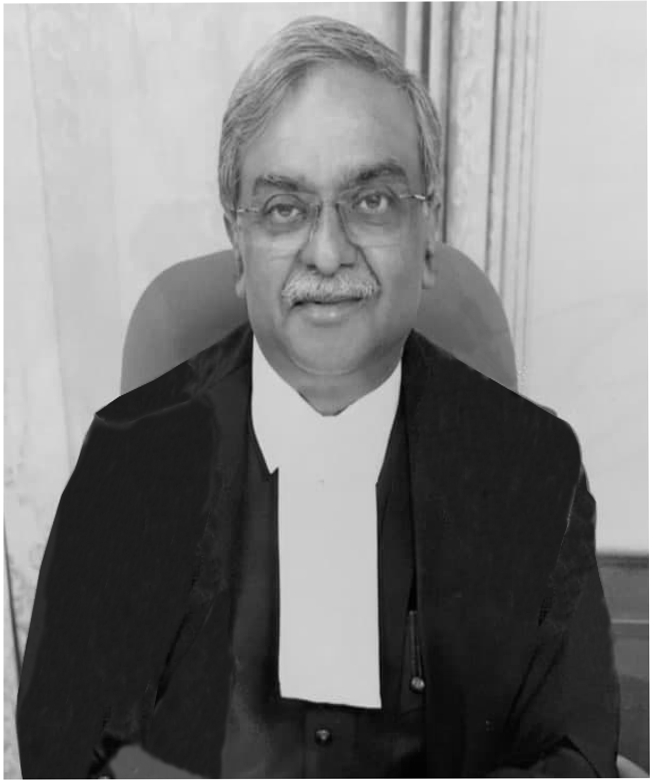

Judge of the Supreme Court of India
- Incumbent
- Assumed office 31 August 2021
- Nominated by: N. V. Ramana
- Appointed by: Ram Nath Kovind

25th Chief Justice of the Gujarat High Court
- In office 10 September 2019 – 30 August 2021
- Nominated by: Ranjan Gogoi
- Appointed by: Ram Nath Kovind
- Preceded by: R. Subhash Reddy
- Succeeded by: Aravind Kumar

Judge of the Allahabad High Court
- In office 24 September 2004 – 9 September 2019
- Nominated by: Ramesh Chandra Lahoti
- Appointed by: A. P. J. Abdul Kalam

Personal details
- Born: 24 September 1962 (age 64) Kaushambi, Uttar Pradesh, India
- Education: University of Lucknow

Vikram Nath (born 24 September 1962) is a judge of the Supreme Court of India. He is a former chief justice of the Gujarat High Court and former judge of the Allahabad High Court. He was earlier recommended as chief justice of the Andhra Pradesh High Court but the centre disapproved the recommendation. He is the first chief justice of a High Court in India to livestream its proceedings on YouTube during the 2020 COVID-19 pandemic. Also, he is the ex officio executive chairman of National Legal Services Authority.

He was appointed to the Supreme Court on 31 August 2021. He is scheduled to become the 54th Chief Justice of India, if the convention of seniority is followed.

== Early life and career ==
Vikram Nath was born on 24 September 1962 in a middle-class family in Kaushambi district of Uttar Pradesh. He followed the footsteps of his paternal ancestry by pursuing law as a subject and is currently the 4th generation to do so. Born and raised at Allahabad, Uttar Pradesh.

He graduated in Science in the 1983 and later obtained his law degree from the University of Lucknow's Shia PG college in 1986

He practiced as a lawyer at Allahabad High Court for a period of 17 years. He was elevated as judge of Allahabad High Court on 24 September 2004. He was elevated as Chief Justice of Gujarat High Court on 10 September 2019.

He was elevated as a judge of the Supreme Court of India on 26 August 2021 and took oath on 31 August 2021. He is in line to become Chief Justice of India in 2027 after the retirement of Justice Surya Kant.
