= Ramayyagari Subhash Reddy =

Indian judge (born 1957)

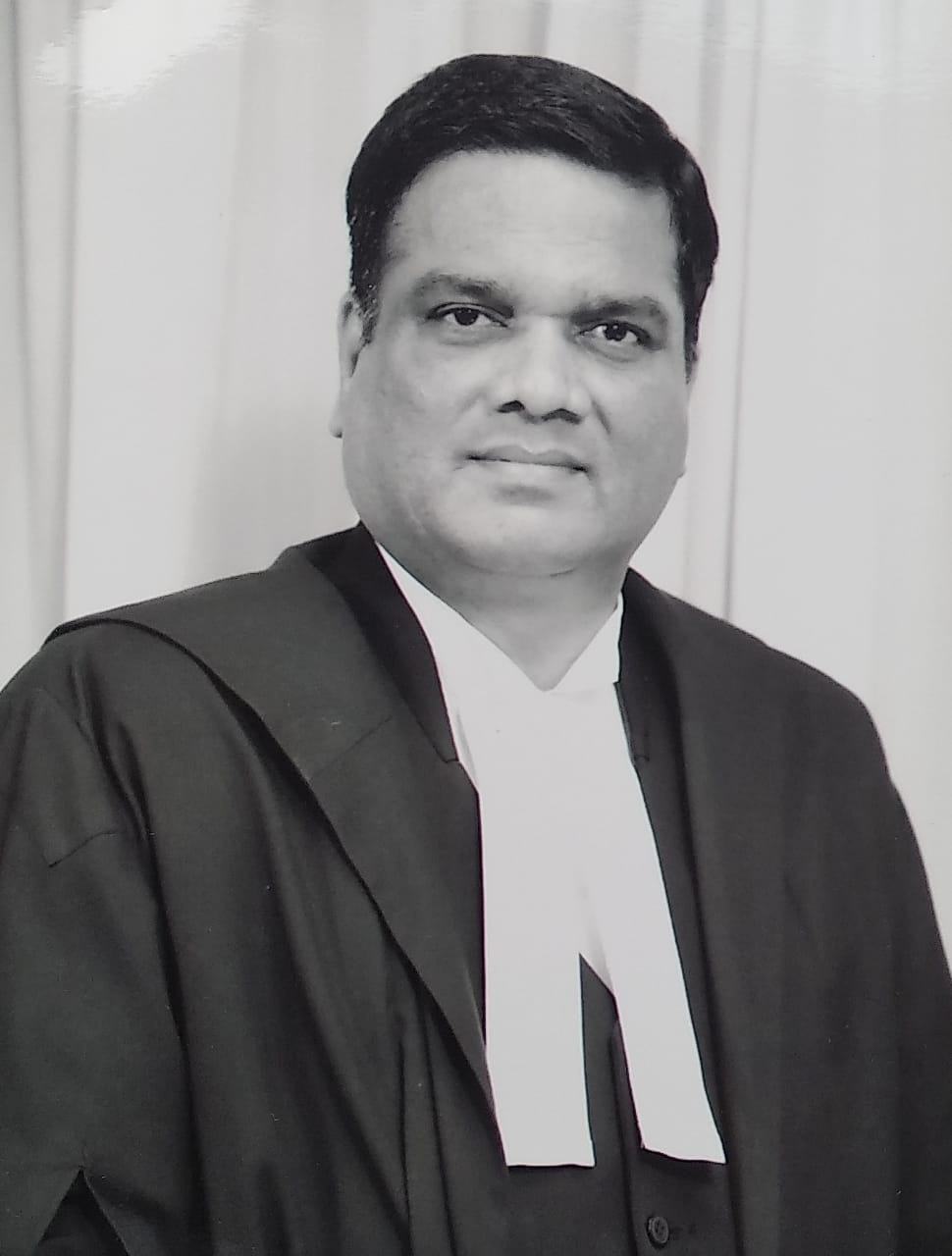

Judge of the Supreme Court of India
- In office 2 November 2018 – 4 January 2022
- Nominated by: Ranjan Gogoi
- Appointed by: Ramnath Kovind

Chief Justice of the Gujarat High Court
- In office 13 February 2016 – 1 November 2018
- Nominated by: T. S. Thakur
- Appointed by: Ram Nath Kovind

Judge of the Andhra Pradesh High Court
- In office 2 December 2002 – 12 February 2016
- Nominated by: Gopal Ballav Pattanaik
- Appointed by: A. P. J. Abdul Kalam

Personal details
- Born: 5 January 1957 (age 69) Kamaram Village, Shankarampet(R) Mandal, Medak District, Telangana
- Education: Osmania University

Ramayyagari Subhash Reddy is a retired judge of the Supreme Court of India. He also served as chief justice of the Gujarat High Court and judge of the Andhra Pradesh High Court.

== Career ==
Reddy was born on 5 January 1957. He was enrolled as an advocate on 30 October 1980 and practiced at tribunals, civil and other courts, including the Andhra Pradesh High Court and the Supreme Court in civil, criminal, constitutional, revenue, taxation, labour, company and service matters in both original and appellate jurisdiction. His field of specialization is constitutional law. He was appointed an additional judge of the Andhra Pradesh High Court on 2 December 2002 and as permanent judge on 24 June 2004. He was appointed chief justice of the Gujarat High Court on 13 February 2016. He was appointed as a judge of the Supreme Court of India on 2 November 2018. He retired on 4 January 2022.
