= Sonia Gokani =

Former Chief Justice of Gujarat High Court

Hon'ble Ms. Chief Justice (Retd.) Sonia Giridhar Gokani

Chief Justice of Gujarat High Court
- In office 16 February 2023 – 25 February 2023
- Nominated by: Dhananjaya Y. Chandrachud
- Appointed by: Droupadi Murmu

Acting Chief Justice of Gujarat High Court
- In office 13 February 2023 – 15 February 2023
- Appointed by: Droupadi Murmu

Judge of Gujarat High Court
- In office 17 February 2011 – 15 February 2023
- Nominated by: S. H. Kapadia
- Appointed by: Pratibha Patil

Personal details
- Born: 26 February 1961 (age 65) Jamnagar

Sonia Giridhar Gokani (born 26 February 1961) is a retired Indian judge and former Chief Justice of Gujarat High Court. She has previously served as an Acting Chief Justice as well as judge of Gujarat High Court.

== Life ==
Justice Sonia Gokani was born on 26 February 1961 in Jamnagar. Gujarat, India. She studied B. Sc. in Microbiology and later completed LLB and LLM.

She served as a part-time lecturer at K.P Shah Law College, Jamnagar. She served as a member of District Consumer Disputes Redressal Forum for five years.

She joined as a judge of the City Civil and Sessions Court of Ahmedabad on 10 July 1995. She served as the judge of the Special Court under the Anti-Terrorism law of Gujarat from 2003 to 2008. She also worked as the judge of Special Court of the Central Bureau of Investigation.

In 2008, she was appointed the Registrar for the recruitment department of the Gujarat High Court. She later served as the Registrar of information technology and infrastructure department for one and half years. She also taught at Gujarat State Judicial Academy. She was appointed the Additional Judge of the Gujarat High Court on 17 February 2011 and was made Permanent Judge on 28 January 2013. She was appointed as Acting Chief Justice of Gujarat High Court on 13 February 2023. She was appointed as Chief Justice of Gujarat High Court on 16 February 2023.
