= Gujarat High Court =

High Court for the State of Gujarat

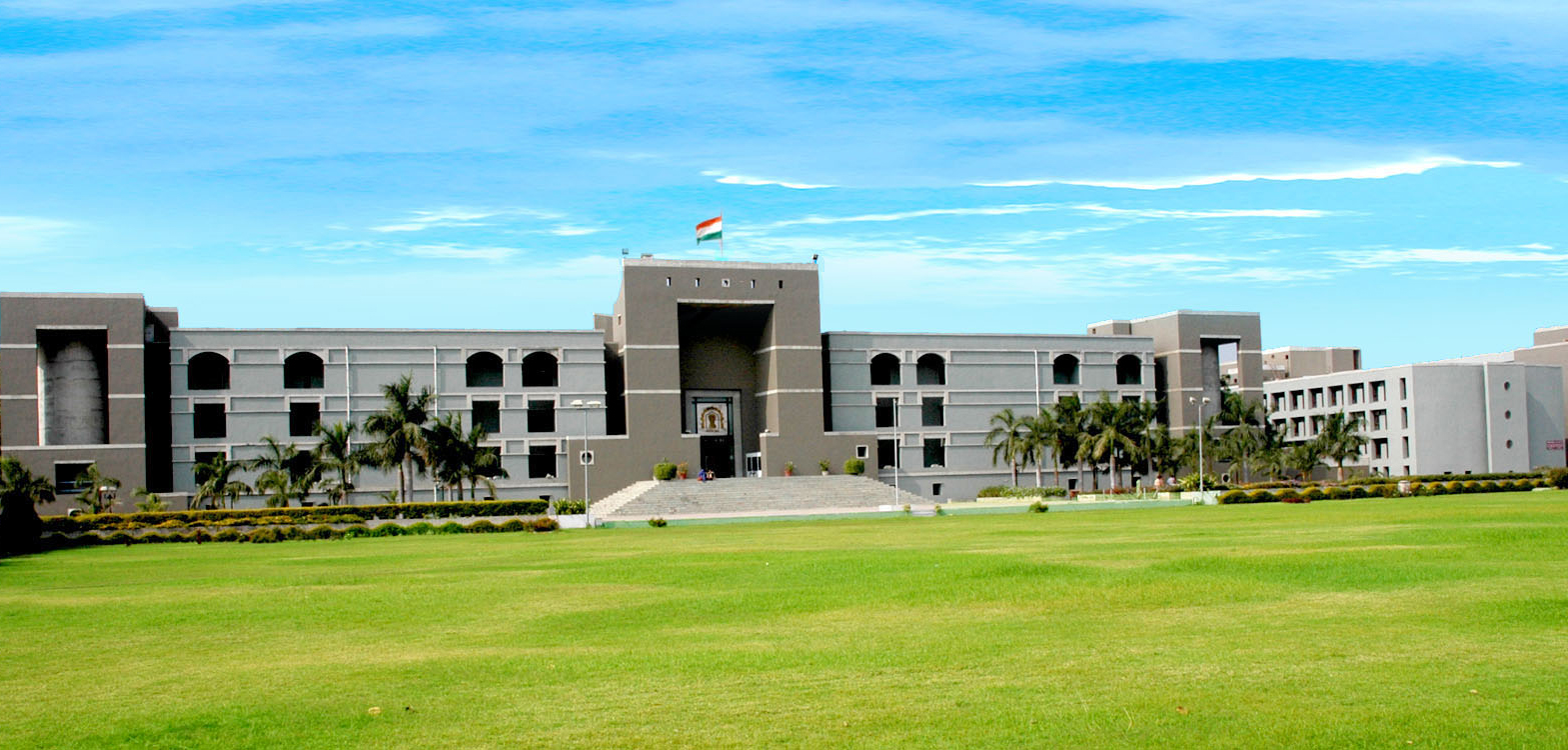
- The Gujarat High Court building
- Interactive map of Gujarat High Court
- 23.0802°N 72.5244°E
- Established: 1 May 1960; 66 years ago
- Jurisdiction: Gujarat
- Location: Ahmedabad, Gujarat
- Coordinates: 23.0802°N 72.5244°E
- Composition method: Presidential appointment with confirmation of Chief Justice of India and Governor of respective state.
- Authorised by: Constitution of India
- Appeals to: Supreme Court of India
- Judge term length: Mandatory retirement by age of 62 years
- Number of positions: 52 (Permanent 39; Additional 13)
- Website: gujarathighcourt.nic.in

Chief Justice
- Currently: Manash Ranjan Pathak (ACJ)
- Since: 6 October 2026

The Gujarat High Court is the High Court of the state of Gujarat. It was established on 1 May 1960 under the Bombay Re-organisation Act, 1960 after the state of Gujarat split from Bombay State.

The seat of the court is Ahmedabad.

== Establishment ==
This High Court was established on 1 May 1960 as a result of bifurcation of the former State of Bombay into two States of Maharashtra and Gujarat. The High Court started functioning near Akashwani, Navrangpura, Ahmedabad. The High Court had later shifted to the new building at Sarkhej - Gandhinagar Highway, Sola, Ahmedabad, Gujarat, from 16 January 1999.

== Jurisdiction ==
The Gujarat High Court has jurisdiction over the entire state of Gujarat and on all district, administrative and other courts in Gujarat. This high court is a Court of record and empowered to punish anyone for contempt of court.

== Powers ==
Unlike Union Judiciary, the state judiciary possesses wide powers which include powers such as Appellate, Second Appellate in some cases, Revisionary, Review etc. It also has power to issue various writs to courts and authorities under its jurisdiction. Intra-Court appeals, when permissible under Clause - 15 of Letters Patent, also lie within the same court from decision of a Single Judge to a Division Bench which comprises two Judges. It has power of superintendence on all courts under it under Article 227 of the Constitution of India. The High Courts are also empowered to hear Public Interest Litigations.

== Chief Justice and Judges ==
The present strength of Gujarat High court is 35 against sanctioned strength of 52 posts which includes 39 permanent posts and 13 additional posts.

The high court is headed by the Chief Justice on administrative side. They are appointed by President of India under warrant. However, the president is required to consult the Governor of Gujarat and the Chief Justice of India before making such appointment. The Governor of Gujarat administers the oath of office at the time of appointment. The present Chief Justice of the court is Justice Sunita Agarwal. Various benches are constituted depending upon the requirements of that High Court. These benches usually consist of division benches (two judges) and benches presided over by single judges. A roster is maintained by the High Court to assign the matters between various benches. Chief Justices in all the High Courts as also the Chief Justice of the Supreme Court are masters of the roster.

=== Judges ===
All judges of the high court are appointed by the President of India after recommendation by the Supreme Court Collegium. They hold constitutional post and there are ample safeguards provided in the constitution to ensure the independence of the judiciary. Any judge can resign by writing to the President of India. Terms of appointment of judges cannot be altered to their disadvantage after their appointment.

=== Qualifications ===
The following are qualifications to be judge of Gujarat High Court or any other High Court in India.

- The individual must be citizen of India
- The individual must have held a judicial office in India for at least ten years; or
- Been advocate in any high court or two or more courts in succession for at least 10 years.

== Live Streaming ==
The High Court of Gujarat was pioneer in the country to live stream its proceedings. After successful implementation of live proceedings of its benches, the High Court also began live streaming of proceedings of the Principal District Courts across the state from February, 2023.

== Former Chief Justices ==
#	Portrait	Chief Justice	Tenure		Parent High Court
#	Portrait	Chief Justice	Start	End	Parent High Court
1		Sunderlal Trikamlal Desai	1 May 1960	25 January 1961	Bombay
2		Kantilal Thakoredas Desai	26 January 1961	22 May 1963	Bombay
3		Jaishanker Manilal Shelat	31 May 1963	24 February 1966	Bombay
4		Nomanbhai Mahmedbhai Miabhoy	21 February 1966	15 September 1967	Bombay
5	P. N. Bhagwati	P. N. Bhagwati	16 September 1967	16 July 1973	Gujarat
6		Bipinchandra Jivanlal Diwan	17 July 1973	1 July 1976	Gujarat
7		Seshareddi Obul Reddy	7 July 1976	18 August 1977	Andhra Pradesh
(6)		Bipinchandra Jivanlal Diwan	28 August 1977	20 August 1981	Gujarat
8		Manharlal Pranlal Thakkar	20 August 1981	15 March 1983	Gujarat
9		Padmanabham Subramanian Poti	28 September 1983	1 February 1985	Kerala
10		Puliyangudi Ramaiyapillai Gokulakrishnan	21 March 1985	12 August 1990	Madras
11		Ganendra Narayan Ray	2 December 1990	7 October 1991	Calcutta
12		Sundaram Nainar Sundaram	15 June 1992	13 December 1993	Madras
13	B. N. Kirpal	Bhupinder Nath Kirpal	14 December 1993	11 September 1995	Delhi
14		Gurudas Datta Kamat	1 July 1996	4 January 1997	Bombay
15		Kumaran Sreedharan	20 October 1997	3 June 1998	Kerala
16	K. G. Balakrishnan	K. G. Balakrishnan	16 July 1998	7 September 1999	Kerala
17		D. M. Dharmadhikari	25 January 2000	4 March 2002	Madhya Pradesh
18		Daya Saran Sinha	17 March 2002	18 March 2003	Allahabad
19		Bhawani Singh	25 August 2003	27 March 2006	Himachal Pradesh
20		Y. R. Meena	3 February 2007	30 June 2008	Rajasthan
21		K S Panicker Radhakrishnan	4 September 2008	16 November 2009	Kerala
22		S J Mukhopadhaya	9 December 2009	13 September 2011	Patna
23		Bhaskar Bhattacharya	21 July 2012	28 September 2014	Calcutta
24		R. Subhash Reddy	12 February 2016	01 November 2018	Andhra Pradesh
25		Vikram Nath	10 September 2019	30 August 2021	Allahabad
26		Aravind Kumar	13 October 2021	12 February 2023	Karnataka
27		Sonia Giridhar Gokani	13 February 2023	25 February 2023	Gujarat

== Judges elevated as Chief Justices ==
This sections contains list of only those judges elevated as chief justices whose parent high court is Gujarat. This includes those judges who, at the time of appointment as chief justice, may not be serving in Gujarat High Court but this list does not include judges who at the time of appointment as chief justice were serving in Gujarat High Court but does not have Gujarat as their Parent High Court.

Colour Key

- Female Chief Justice
- Served as Chief Justice of India

Symbol Key

- ^{‡} Elevated to Supreme Court of India
- ^{RES} Resigned
- ^{†} Died in office

Name	Image	Appointed as CJ in HC of	Date of appointment		Date of retirement (Note: this includes date of resignation, death and elevation to supreme court)	Tenure	
Name	Image	Appointed as CJ in HC of	As Judge	As Chief Justice	Date of retirement	As Chief Justice	As Judge (Note: also includes tenure as Chief Justice)
Prafullachandra Natwarlal Bhagwati		Gujarat	21 July 1960	16 September 1967	17 July 1973^{[‡]}	5 years, 305 days	12 years, 362 days
Bipinchandra Jivanlal Diwan		Gujarat, transferred to Andhra Pradesh then back to Gujarat	19 April 1962	18 July 1973	19 August 1981	8 years, 33 days	19 years, 123 days
Manharlal Pranlal Thakkar		Gujarat	2 July 1969	20 August 1981	14 March 1983^{[‡]}	1 year, 207 days	13 years, 256 days
Tryambkalal Umedchand Mehta		Himachal Pradesh	17 November 1969	25 July 1978	11 December 1979	1 year, 140 days	10 years, 25 days
Prabodh Dinkarrao Desai		Himachal Pradesh, transferred to Calcutta then to Bombay	19 February 1970	23 December 1983	14 December 1992	8 years, 358 days	22 years, 300 days
Shailesh Bhadrayulal Majumdar		Andhra Pradesh, transferred to Karnataka	3 October 1978	12 October 1992	18 September 1994^{[‡]}	1 year, 342 days	15 years, 351 days
Girish Thakorlal Nanavati		Orissa, transferred to Karnataka	19 July 1979	31 January 1994	5 March 1995^{[‡]}	1 year, 34 days	15 years, 230 days
Amratlal Parmananddas Ravani		Rajasthan	26 May 1982	4 April 1995	10 September 1996^{[RES]}	1 year, 160 days	14 years, 108 days
Manharlal Bhikhalal Shah		Bombay	28 January 1983	2 August 1995	8 December 1998^{[‡]}	3 years, 129 days	15 years, 315 days
Chunilal Karsandas Thakker		Himachal Pradesh, transferred to Bombay	21 June 1990	5 May 2000	6 June 2004^{[‡]}	4 years, 33 days	13 years, 352 days
Babulal Chandulal Patel		Jammu & Kashmir, transferred to Delhi	21 June 1990	15 May 2002	7 August 2005	3 years, 85 days	15 years, 48 days
Jitendrakumar Nanalal Bhatt		Patna	21 June 1990	18 July 2005	16 October 2007	2 years, 91 days	17 years, 118 days
Kshitij Rameshbhai Vyas		Bombay	22 November 1990	25 February 2006	18 July 2006	144 days	15 years, 239 days
Jagdish Madhurlal Panchal		Rajasthan	22 November 1990	16 September 2007	11 November 2007^{[‡]}	57 days	16 years, 355 days
Anil Ramesh Dave		Andhra Pradesh, transferred to Bombay	18 September 1995	7 January 2008	29 April 2010^{[‡]}	2 years, 113 days	14 years, 224 days
Mohit Shantilal Shah		Calcutta, transferred to Bombay	18 September 1995	24 December 2009	8 September 2015	5 years, 259 days	19 years, 356 days
Rekha Manharlal Doshit		Patna	18 September 1995	21 June 2010	12 December 2014	4 years, 175 days	19 years, 86 days
Dhirendra Hiralal Waghela		Karnataka, transferred to Orissa then to Bombay	17 September 1999	7 March 2013	10 August 2016	3 years, 157 days	16 years, 329 days
Mukesh Rasikbhai Shah		Patna	7 March 2004	12 August 2018	1 November 2018^{[‡]}	82 days	14 years, 240 days
Kalpesh Satyendra Jhaveri		Orissa	7 March 2004	12 August 2018	4 January 2020	1 year, 146 days	15 years, 304 days
Akil Abdulhamid Kureshi		Tripura, transferred to Rajasthan	7 March 2004	16 November 2019	6 March 2022	2 years, 111 days	18 years, 0 days
Dhirubhai Naranbhai Patel		Delhi	7 March 2004	7 June 2019	12 March 2022	2 years, 279 days	18 years, 6 days
Rashmin Manharbhai Chhaya		Gauhati	17 February 2011	23 June 2022	11 January 2023	203 days	11 years, 329 days
Sonia Giridhar Gokani		Gujarat	17 February 2011	16 February 2023	25 February 2023	10 days	12 years, 9 days
Ashish Jitendra Desai		Kerala	21 November 2011	22 July 2023	4 July 2024	349 days	12 years, 227 days
Nilay Vipinchandra Anjaria		Karnataka	21 November 2011	25 February 2024	29 May 2025^{[‡]}	1 year, 94 days	13 years, 190 days
Vipul Manubhai Pancholi		Patna	1 October 2014	21 July 2025	28 August 2025^{[‡]}	39 days	13 years, 129 days
Alpesh Yeshvant Kogje		Madhya Pradesh	6 April 2016	10 September 2026	Incumbent	37 days	10 years, 194 days

=== Judges appointed as Acting Chief Justice ===
Name	Appointed as ACJ in HC of	Date of appointment as Judge	Period as Acting Chief Justice	Date of retirement	Tenure as ACJ	Tenure as Judge	Remarks	Ref..
Jayantilal Bapalal Mehta	Gujarat	5 August 1963	30 Jun 1976 – 6 Jul 1976	5 October 1977^{[RES]}	7 days	14 years, 62 days	--	
Jayantilal Bapalal Mehta	Gujarat	5 August 1963	19 Aug 1977 – 27 Aug 1977	5 October 1977^{[RES]}	9 days	14 years, 62 days	--	
Tryambkalal Umedchand Mehta	Himachal Pradesh	17 November 1969	20 Feb 1978 – 24 Jul 1978	11 December 1979	155 days	10 years, 25 days	Became permanent	
P. D. Desai	Gujarat	19 February 1970	15 Mar 1983 – 27 Sep 1983	14 December 1992	197 days	22 years, 300 days	--	
Batukumar Kantiprasad Mehta	Gujarat	19 February 1970	2 Feb 1985 – 20 Mar 1985	21 July 1986	47 days	16 years, 153 days	--	
Rameshkumar Chunilal Mankad	Gujarat	28 December 1977	13 Aug 1990 – 1 Dec 1990	18 February 1992	111 days	14 years, 53 days	--	
Rameshkumar Chunilal Mankad	Gujarat	28 December 1977	7 Oct 1991 – 18 Feb 1992	18 February 1992	135 days	14 years, 53 days	Retired as ACJ	
Shailesh Bhadrayulal Majmudar	Gujarat	3 October 1978	19 Feb 1992 – 14 Jun 1992	18 September 1994^{[‡]}	117 days	15 years, 351 days	--	
G. T. Nanavati	Orissa	19 July 1979	14 Dec 1993 – 30 Jan 1994	5 March 1995^{[‡]}	48 days	15 years, 230 days	Became permanent	
R. A. Mehta	Gujarat	5 September 1983	11 Sep 1995 – 1 Jul 1996	4 May 1998	294 days	14 years, 242 days	--	
R. A. Mehta	Gujarat	5 September 1983	5 Jan 1997 – 19 Oct 1997	4 May 1998	288 days	14 years, 242 days	--	
C. K. Thakker	Gujarat	21 June 1990	9 Sep 1999 – 24 Jan 2000	6 June 2004^{[‡]}	138 days	13 years, 352 days	--	
B. C. Patel	Gujarat	21 June 1990	5 Mar 2002 – 16 Mar 2002	7 August 2005	12 days	15 years, 48 days	--	
Niranjan Janmashanker Pandya	Bombay	21 June 1990	21 Feb 2000 – 30 Mar 2000	6 August 2000	39 days	10 years, 47 days	--	
J. N. Bhatt	Gujarat	21 June 1990	18 Mar 2003 – 24 Aug 2003	16 October 2007	160 days	17 years, 118 days	--	
Behram Jahanbux Shethna	Gujarat	22 November 1990	28 Mar 2006 – 2 Apr 2006	14 April 2007^{[RES]}	6 days	16 years, 144 days	--	
Jagdish Madhurlal Panchal	Rajasthan	22 November 1990	16 Jul 2007 – 15 Sep 2007	11 November 2007^{[‡]}	62 days	16 years, 355 days	Became permanent	
M. S. Shah	Gujarat	18 September 1995	1 Jul 2008 – 3 Sep 2008	8 September 2015	65 days	19 years, 356 days	--	
M. S. Shah	Gujarat	18 September 1995	16 Nov 2009 – 8 Dec 2009	8 September 2015	23 days	19 years, 356 days	--	
Ashokkumar Laxminarayan Dave	Gujarat	11 December 1997	13 Sep 2011 – 7 Nov 2011	4 December 2012	56 days	14 years, 360 days	--	
Jayant Maganlal Patel	Gujarat	3 December 2001	13 Aug 2015 – 12 Feb 2016	25 September 2017^{[RES]}	184 days	15 years, 297 days	Transferred to Karnataka	
K. S. Jhaveri	Rajasthan	7 March 2004	17 Feb 2017 – 1 Apr 2017	4 January 2020	44 days	15 years, 304 days	--	
A. A. Kureshi	Gujarat	7 March 2004	2 Nov 2018 – 13 Nov 2018	6 March 2022	12 days	18 years, 0 days	Transferred to Bombay	
D. N. Patel	Jharkhand	7 March 2004	4 Aug 2013 – 15 Nov 2013	12 March 2022	104 days	18 years, 6 days	--	
D. N. Patel	Jharkhand	7 March 2004	13 Aug 2014 – 31 Oct 2014	12 March 2022	80 days	18 years, 6 days	--	
D. N. Patel	Jharkhand	7 March 2004	10 Jun 2017 – 10 Aug 2018	12 March 2022	1 year, 62 days	18 years, 6 days	--	
D. N. Patel	Jharkhand	7 March 2004	24 May 2019 – 6 Jun 2019	12 March 2022	14 days	18 years, 6 days	Elevated as CJ of Delhi	
A. S. Dave	Gujarat	8 October 2004	14 Nov 2018 – 9 Sep 2019	4 December 2019	300 days	15 years, 58 days	--	
R. M. Chhaya	Gujarat	17 February 2011	2 Sep 2021 – 12 Oct 2021	11 January 2023	41 days	11 years, 329 days	--	
S. G. Gokani	Gujarat	17 February 2011	13 Feb 2023 – 15 Feb 2023	25 February 2023	3 days	12 years, 9 days	Became permanent	
A. J. Desai	Gujarat	21 November 2011	26 Feb 2023 – 22 Jul 2023	4 July 2024	147 days	12 years, 227 days	Elevated as CJ of Kerala	

== Judges elevated to Supreme Court ==
This section includes the list of only those judges whose parent high court was Gujarat. This includes those judges who, at the time of elevation to Supreme Court of India, may not be serving in Gujarat High Court but this list does not include judges who at the time of elevation were serving in Gujarat High Court but does not have Gujarat as their Parent High Court.

Colour Key

- Female Judge
- Served as Chief Justice of India

Key

- ^{RES} Resigned
- ^{†} Died in office

#	Name of the Judge	Image	Date of Appointment		Date of Retirement	Tenure			Immediately preceding office
#	Name of the Judge	Image	In Parent High Court	In Supreme Court	Date of Retirement	In High Court(s)	In Supreme Court	Total tenure (Note: Includes both tenure as High Court Judge as well as Supreme Court Judge)	Immediately preceding office
1	Prafullachandra Natwarlal Bhagwati		21 July 1960	17 July 1973	20 December 1986	12 years, 362 days	13 years, 157 days	26 years, 153 days	5th CJ of Gujarat HC
2	Dhirajlal Ambelal Desai		19 February 1968	30 September 1977	8 May 1985	9 years, 223 days	7 years, 221 days	17 years, 79 days	Judge of Gujarat HC
3	Manharlal Pranlal Thakkar		2 July 1969	15 March 1983	3 November 1988	13 years, 256 days	5 years, 234 days	19 years, 125 days	8th CJ of Gujarat HC
4	Aziz Mushabber Ahmadi		2 September 1976	14 December 1988	24 March 1997	12 years, 103 days	8 years, 101 days	20 years, 204 days	Judge of Gujarat HC
5	Shailesh Bhadrayulal Majumdar		3 October 1978	19 September 1994	19 August 2000	15 years, 351 days	5 years, 336 days	21 years, 322 days	14th CJ of Karnataka HC
6	Girish Thakorlal Nanavati		19 July 1979	6 March 1995	16 February 2000	15 years, 230 days	4 years, 348 days	20 years, 213 days	15th CJ of Karnataka HC
7	Manharlal Bhikhalal Shah		28 January 1983	9 December 1998	24 September 2003	15 years, 315 days	4 years, 290 days	20 years, 240 days	30th CJ of Bombay HC
8	Chunilal Karsandas Thakker		21 June 1990	7 June 2004	10 November 2008	13 years, 352 days	4 years, 157 days	18 years, 143 days	33rd CJ of Bombay HC
9	Jagdish Madhurlal Panchal		22 November 1990	12 November 2007	5 October 2011	16 years, 355 days	3 years, 328 days	20 years, 318 days	26th CJ of Rajasthan HC
10	Anil Ramesh Dave		18 September 1995	30 April 2010	18 November 2016	14 years, 224 days	6 years, 203 days	21 years, 62 days	38th CJ of Bombay HC
11	Mukesh Rasikbhai Shah		7 March 2004	2 November 2018	15 May 2023	14 years, 240 days	4 years, 195 days	19 years, 70 days	41st CJ of Patna HC
12	Bela Trivedi		17 February 2011	31 August 2021	9 June 2025	10 years, 195 days	3 years, 283 days	14 years, 113 days	Judge of Gujarat HC
13	Jamshed Burjor Pardiwala		17 February 2011	9 May 2022	Incumbent	11 years, 81 days	4 years, 161 days	15 years, 242 days	Judge of Gujarat HC
14	Nilay Vipinchandra Anjaria		21 November 2011	30 May 2025	Incumbent	13 years, 190 days	1 year, 140 days	14 years, 330 days	34th CJ of Karnataka HC
15	Vipul Manubhai Pancholi		1 October 2014	29 August 2025	Incumbent	10 years, 332 days	1 year, 49 days	12 years, 16 days	45th CJ of Patna HC

== See also ==
- High Courts of India

== See also ==
1. Jurisdiction and Seats of Indian High Courts
2. Judge strength in High Courts increased

High Courts job lest update
