= List of chief justices of the Himachal Pradesh High Court =

Chief Justice of Himachal Pradesh High Court
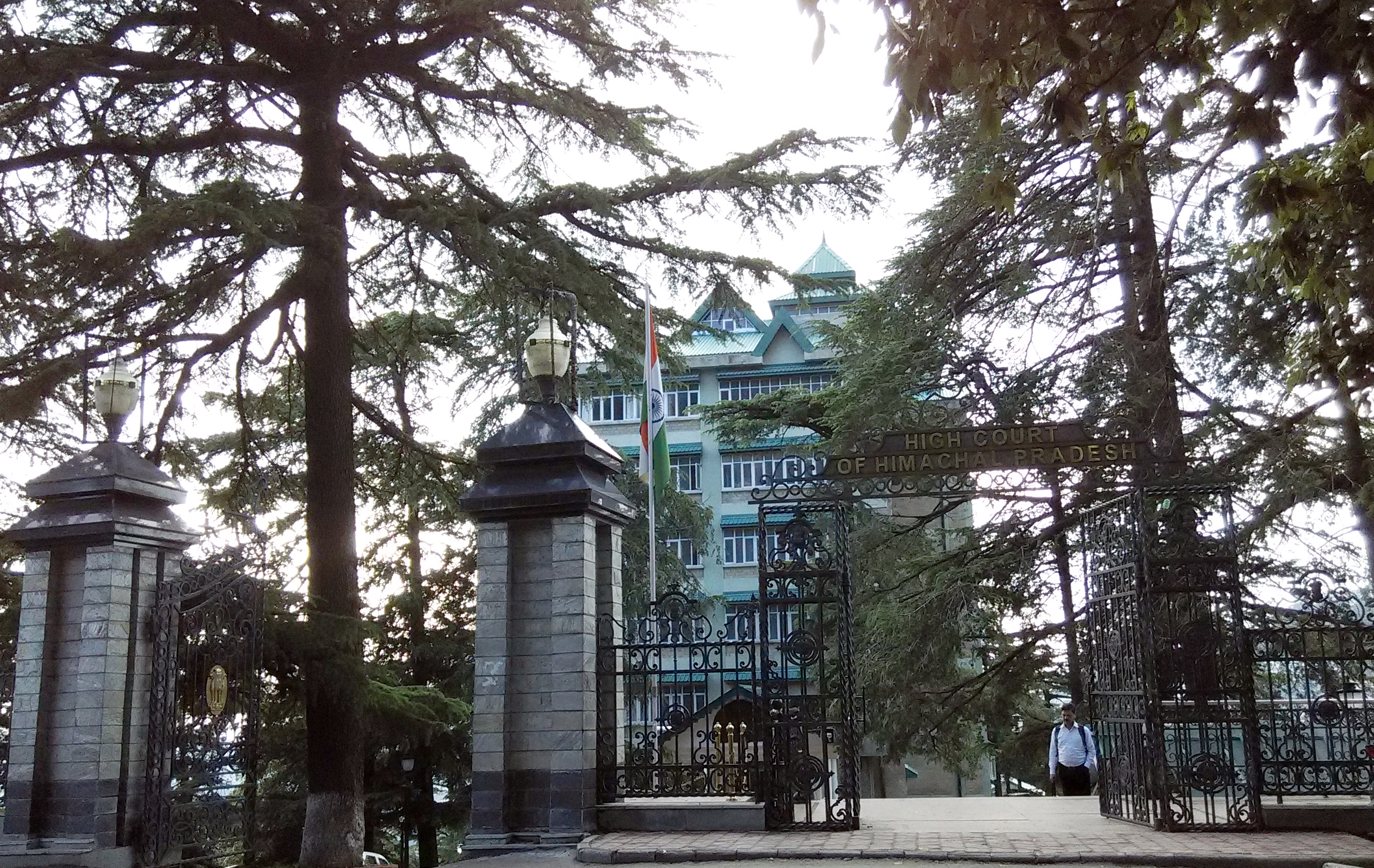
- Incumbent; Gurmeet Singh Sandhawalia since 29 December 2024
- Himachal Pradesh High Court
- Abbreviation: CJ Himachal Pradesh
- Seat: Shimla, Himachal Pradesh, India
- Nominator: Collegium of the Supreme Court
- Appointer: President of India
- Term length: till the age of 62 yrs
- Constituting instrument: Constitution of India (under Article 214)
- Formation: 25 January 1971; 55 years ago
- First holder: Justice M. H. Beg (25 January 1971 – 9 December 1971)
- Salary: ₹250,000 (US$2,700) (per month)
- Website: https://highcourt.hp.gov.in/

The Himachal Pradesh High Court is the High Court of the state of Himachal Pradesh, India.

Colour Key

- Served as Chief Justice of India
- Female Chief Justice
- Elevated to Supreme Court of India
- Female chief justice elevated to Supreme Court of India

Symbol Key

- ^{‡} Resigned
- ^{†} Died in office

Chief Justices elevated to Supreme Court of India includes those who were elevated to supreme court at any point of their career.

Chief Justices mentioned in italics were those who were serving as Acting Chief Justice in the same high court immediately before their permanent appointment.

Date of initial appointment - Date of first appointment as High court judge

CJ - Chief Justice

== List ==
The Himachal Pradesh High Court was established on 25 January 1971 under the State of Himachal Pradesh Act, 1970 and has had 29 permanent Chief Justices and several Acting Chief Justices.

#	Name	Portrait	Date of Appointment	Date of Retirement	Tenure	Parent High Court	Date of initial Appointment	Notes
1 Expand	Mirza Hameedullah Beg		25 January 1971	9 December 1971	319 days	Allahabad	11 June 1963	
--	Dhruva Bihari Lal		10 December 1971	17 March 1972	99 days	Himachal Pradesh	11 March 1971	
2	Raghunandan Swarup Pathak		18 March 1972	19 February 1978	5 years, 339 days	Allahabad	1 October 1962	
3	Tryambkalal Umedchand Mehta		25 July 1978	11 December 1979	1 year, 140 days	Gujarat	17 November 1969	(Note: He became ACJ on 20 February 1978 and served till 24 July 1978 for 155 days before becoming permanent Chief Justice)
4 Expand	Vyas Dev Misra		12 December 1979	30 September 1983	3 years, 293 days	Delhi	30 July 1969	
--	Hira Singh Thakur		1 October 1983	22 December 1983	83 days	Himachal Pradesh	5 January 1979	
5 Expand	Prabodh Dinkarrao Desai		23 December 1983	13 November 1988	4 years, 327 days	Gujarat	19 February 1970	(Note: Transferred to Calcutta High Court)
--	Vijaya Kumar Mehrotra		14 November 1988	28 March 1989	135 days	Allahabad	30 March 1978	
6 Expand	Narendra Mohan Kasliwal		29 March 1989	5 October 1989	191 days	Rajasthan	15 June 1978	
--	Vijaya Kumar Mehrotra		6 October 1989	5 November 1989	31 days	Allahabad	30 March 1978	
7 Expand	Perumbulavil Chakkala Valappil Balakrishna Menon		6 November 1989	14 January 1991	1 year, 70 days	Kerala	18 September 1980	
--	Vijaya Kumar Mehrotra		15 January 1991	4 August 1991	202 days	Allahabad	30 March 1978	
8 Expand	Leila Seth		5 August 1991	19 October 1992	1 year, 76 days	Delhi	25 July 1978	
--	Bhawani Singh		20 October 1992	21 June 1993	245 days	Himachal Pradesh	16 December 1988	
9 Expand	Shashi Kant Seth		22 June 1993	27 August 1993	67 days	Madhya Pradesh	27 November 1978	
--	Bhawani Singh		28 August 1993	28 January 1994	154 days	Himachal Pradesh	16 December 1988	
10 Expand	Viswanathan Ratnam		29 January 1994	31 July 1994	184 days	Madras	25 January 1979	
--	Bhawani Singh		1 August 1994	16 September 1994	47 days	Himachal Pradesh	16 December 1988	
11	Gulab Chand Gupta		17 September 1994	28 February 1995	165 days	Madhya Pradesh	20 June 1983	
12 Expand	Sailendu Nath Phukan		1 March 1995	1 August 1996	1 year, 154 days	Gauhati	11 October 1985	(Note: Transferred to Orissa High Court)
--	Kamlesh Sharma		2 August 1996	11 August 1996	10 days	Himachal Pradesh	25 June 1990	
13 Expand	Madhavachari Srinivasan		12 August 1996	24 September 1997	1 year, 44 days	Madras	2 June 1986	
--	Kamlesh Sharma		25 September 1997	6 November 1997	43 days	Himachal Pradesh	25 June 1990	
14 Expand	Makani Narayana Rao		6 November 1997	21 April 1998	167 days	Andhra Pradesh	11 July 1986	
--	Kamlesh Sharma		22 April 1998	30 June 1998	70 days	Himachal Pradesh	25 June 1990	
15 Expand	Doraiswamy Raju		1 July 1998	28 January 2000	1 year, 212 days	Madras	14 January 1990	
--	Kamlesh Sharma		29 January 2000	4 May 2000	97 days	Himachal Pradesh	25 June 1990	
16 Expand	Chunilal Karsandas Thakker		5 May 2000	30 December 2001	1 year, 240 days	Gujarat	21 June 1990	(Note: Transferred to Bombay High Court)
--	Kamlesh Sharma		31 December 2001	24 January 2002	25 days	Himachal Pradesh	25 June 1990	
17 Expand	Wungazan Awungshi Shishak		24 January 2002	31 December 2002	342 days	Gauhati	2 January 1989	(Note: CJ of Chhattisgarh High Court transferred as CJ of Himachal Pradesh)
--	Kamlesh Sharma		1 January 2003	7 March 2003	66 days	Himachal Pradesh	25 June 1990	
18	Vinod Kumar Gupta		8 March 2003	1 February 2008	4 years, 331 days	Jammu & Kashmir	7 November 1990	(Note: CJ of Jharkhand High Court transferred as CJ of Himachal Pradesh and subsequently transferred as CJ to Uttarakhand High Court)
19 Expand	Jagadish Bhalla		2 February 2008	9 August 2009	1 year, 189 days	Allahabad	5 April 1995	(Note: Transferred to Rajasthan High Court)
--	Ram Bhawan Misra		10 August 2009	8 February 2010	183 days	Allahabad	24 April 2001	
20 Expand	Kurian Joseph		8 February 2010	7 March 2013	3 years, 28 days	Kerala	12 July 2000	
--	Ram Bhawan Misra		8 March 2013	3 April 2013	27 days	Allahabad	24 April 2001	
21 Expand	Ajay Manikrao Khanwilkar		4 April 2013	24 November 2013	235 days	Bombay	29 March 2000	(Note: Transferred to Madhya Pradesh High Court)
--	Dev Darshan Sud		24 November 2013	26 November 2013	3 days	Himachal Pradesh	27 November 2006	
22 Expand	Mansoor Ahmad Mir		18 June 2014	24 April 2017	2 years, 311 days	Jammu & Kashmir	31 January 2005	(Note: Mir was serving as Judge of Jammu & Kashmir High Court when he was transferred as ACJ and served as such from 27 November 2013 to 17 June 2014 for 203 days before becoming permanent Chief Justice)
--	Sanjay Karol		25 April 2017	5 October 2018	1 year, 164 days	Himachal Pradesh	8 March 2007	
23 Expand	Surya Kant		5 October 2018	23 May 2019	231 days	Punjab & Haryana	9 January 2004	
--	D. C. Chaudhary		24 May 2019	21 June 2019	29 days	Himachal Pradesh	21 January 2012	
24 Expand	V. Ramasubramanian		22 June 2019	22 September 2019	93 days	Madras	31 July 2006	
--	D. C. Chaudhary		23 September 2019	5 October 2019	13 days	Himachal Pradesh	21 January 2012	
25 Expand	Lingappa Narayana Swamy		6 October 2019	30 June 2021	1 year, 268 days	Karnataka	4 July 2007	
--	Ravi Malimath		1 July 2021	13 October 2021	105 days	Karnataka	18 February 2008	(Note: Elevated as Chief Justice of Madhya Pradesh High Court)
26 Expand	Mohammad Rafiq		14 October 2021	24 May 2022	134 days	Rajasthan	15 May 2006	(Note: CJ of Madhya Pradesh High Court transferred as CJ of Himachal Pradesh)
--	Sabina		25 May 2022	22 June 2022	29 days	Punjab & Haryana	12 March 2008	
27 Expand	Amjad Ahtesham Sayed		23 June 2022	20 January 2023	212 days	Bombay	11 April 2007	
--	Sabina		21 January 2023	19 April 2023	89 days	Punjab & Haryana	12 March 2008	(Note: Retired as ACJ)
--	T. S. Chauhan		20 April 2023	29 May 2023	40 days	Himachal Pradesh	23 February 2014	
28	Mamidanna Satyratna Ramachandra Rao		30 May 2023	24 September 2024	1 year, 118 days	Telangana	29 June 2012	(Note: Transferred to Jharkhand High Court)
29 Expand	Rajiv Shakdher		25 September 2024	18 October 2024	24 days	Delhi	11 April 2008	
--	T. S. Chauhan		19 October 2024	28 December 2024	71 days	Himachal Pradesh	23 February 2014	

== Chief justices before creation of Himachal Pradesh High Court ==
This is the list of former chief justices of the Lahore High Court, Punjab High Court and Delhi High Court till 25 January 1971 because these three courts had jurisdiction over the region of present day Himachal Pradesh. On 25 January 1971, separate state of Himachal Pradesh was made be elevating status of Himachal Pradesh from Union territory to State under State of Himachal Pradesh Act, 1970. Thus jurisdiction of Delhi High Court over Himachal Pradesh ceased to exist from that day.

#	Name	Portrait	Date of Appointment	Date of Retirement	Tenure	Parent High Court	Date of initial Appointment	Notes
1	Henry Meredyth Plowden		1880	1895				
2	Charles Arthur Roe		1895	1898				
3	William Ovens Clark		1898	1909				
4	Arthur Hay Stewart Reid		1909	1914				
5	Alfred Kensington		1914	1915				
6	Donald Campbell Johnstone		1915	1917				
7	Henry Adolphus Rattigan		1917	1919				
8	Shadi Lal		1920	1934				
9	John Douglas Young		1934	1943		Allahabad	1929	
10	Arthur Trevor Harries		1943	1946		Allahabad	1934	(Note: CJ of Patna High Court transferred as CJ of Lahore and subsequently transferred as CJ to Calcutta High Court)
11	Abdul Rashid		1946	1947				
Chief Justices of Punjab High Court
1	Ram Lall		15 August 1947	18 January 1949	1 year, 157 days	Lahore (Note: Before independence Lahore High Court has jurisdiction over Punjab, India after independence new High Court for Punjab was created and Indian judges from Lahore High Court was transferred to it.)	9 February 1938	
2	Sudhi Ranjan Das		19 January 1949	20 January 1950	1 year, 2 days	Calcutta	1 December 1942	(Note: Then known as Federal Court of India)
3	Eric Weston		21 January 1950	8 December 1952	2 years, 323 days	Bombay	14 January 1943	
4	Amar Nath Bhandari		8 December 1952	18 November 1959^{[‡]}	6 years, 346 days	Lahore	1944	
5	Gopal Das Khosla		19 November 1959	14 December 1961	2 years, 26 days	Lahore	1 November 1944	
6	Donald Falshaw		15 December 1961	29 May 1966^{[‡]}	4 years, 166 days	Lahore	26 September 1946	
7	Mehar Singh		30 May 1966	30 October 1966	154 days	Punjab & Haryana	24 December 1953	(Note: During his tenure separate Delhi High Court was established and jurisdiction of Himachal Pradesh was transferred to Delhi High Court)
Chief Justices of Delhi High Court
1	Kowdoor Sadananda Hegde		31 October 1966	16 July 1967	259 days	Karnataka	26 August 1957	
2	Inder Dev Dua		17 July 1967	31 July 1969	2 years, 15 days	Punjab & Haryana	11 August 1958	
3	Hans Raj Khanna		1 August 1969	24 January 1971	1 year, 177 days	Punjab & Haryana	7 May 1962	

During tenure of Hans Raj Khanna, separate Himachal Pradesh High Court was established.
