= M. S. Ramachandra Rao (judge) =

9th Chief Justice of Tripura High Court

Hon'ble Chief Justice M. S. Ramachandra Rao
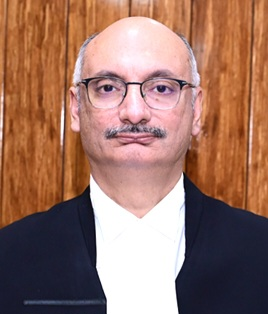

9th Chief Justice of Tripura High Court
- Incumbent
- Assumed office 22 July 2025
- Nominated by: B. R. Gavai
- Appointed by: Droupadi Murmu
- Preceded by: A. K. Singh; T. A. Goud (acting)

16th Chief Justice of Jharkhand High Court
- In office 25 September 2024 – 21 July 2025
- Nominated by: D. Y. Chandrachud
- Appointed by: Droupadi Murmu
- Preceded by: B. R. Sarangi; S. N. Prasad (acting)
- Succeeded by: T. S. Chauhan; S. N. Prasad (acting)

28th Chief Justice of Himachal Pradesh High Court
- In office 30 May 2023 – 24 September 2024
- Nominated by: D. Y. Chandrachud
- Appointed by: Droupadi Murmu
- Preceded by: A. A. Sayed; Sabina (acting); T. S. Chauhan; (acting)
- Succeeded by: Rajiv Shakdher

Judge of Punjab and Haryana High Court
- In office 12 October 2021 – 29 May 2023
- Nominated by: N. V. Ramana
- Appointed by: Ram Nath Kovind

Judge of Telangana High Court
- In office 29 June 2012 – 11 October 2021
- Nominated by: S. H. Kapadia
- Appointed by: Pratibha Patil
- Acting Chief Justice
- In office 31 August 2021 – 11 October 2021
- Appointed by: Ramnath Kovind
- Preceded by: Hima Kohli
- Succeeded by: Satish Chandra Sharma

Personal details
- Born: 7 August 1966 (age 60) Hyderabad, Telangana, India
- Parent: M. Jagannadha Rao (Father)
- Education: LLB, LLM
- Alma mater: Osmania University, University of Cambridge

Mamidanna Satyaratna Ramachandra Rao (born 7 August 1966) is an Indian jurist who is currently serving as the 9th Chief Justice of Tripura High Court. He is also former chief justice of the High Courts of Jharkhand and Himachal Pradesh. He was also judge of Punjab and Haryana High Court and Telangana High Court. He has also served as Acting Chief Justice of Telangana High Court.

== Early life and education ==
Rao was born on 7 August 1966 at Hyderabad to M. Jagannadha Rao, former judge of Supreme Court of India. He passed law from Osmania University in 1989. On 7 September 1989 he was enrolled as an Advocate. He secured LL.M from the University of Cambridge, U.K. in 1991. He was awarded the Cambridge Commonwealth Scholarship and the Bank of Credit and Commerce International Scholarship for study of the LL.M Course at the Cambridge University, U.K. He was also awarded the Pegasus Scholarship by the Pegasus Scholarship Trust, Inner Temple, London headed by Lord Goff of Chievely, a Judicial Member of the House of Lords. Under this Scholarship, he was provided training in the Brick Court Chambers, Middle Temple, London and in Clifford Chance, a multinational Solicitors firm, London. He practiced in Civil Law, Arbitration, Company Law, Administrative and Constitutional Law, Labour and Service Law.

== Career ==
He was elevated as an Additional Judge of Andhra Pradesh High Court on 29 June 2012 and made permanent on 4 December 2013. After bifurcation of erstwhile Andhra Pradesh High Court he opted for Telangana High Court and became its judge with effect from 1 January 2019. He took over as Acting Chief Justice of Telangana High Court on 31 August 2021 consequent upon the appointment of Justice Hima Kohli, Chief Justice of Telangana High Court as a Judge of Supreme Court of India. He was transferred as Judge of Punjab and Haryana High Court on 5 October 2021 and took oath on 12 October 2021.

He was appointed as Chief Justice of Himachal Pradesh High Courtan took oath of office on 30 May 2023. He was then transferred as Chief Justice of Jharkhand High Court and took oath on 25 September 2024.

The Supreme Court Collegium has recommended his transfer to the Tripura High Court in the same capacity during a Collegium meeting held on May 26 and this was cleared by central government and he took oath as Chief Justice of Tripura High Court on 22 July 2025.
