= Tarlok Singh Chauhan =

17th Chief Justice of Jharkhand High Court

Hon'ble Chief Justice (Retd.) Tarlok Singh Chauhan
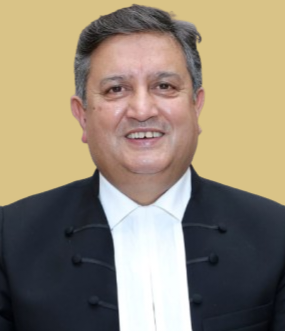

17th Chief Justice of Jharkhand High Court
- In office 23 July 2025 – 8 January 2026
- Nominated by: B. R. Gavai
- Appointed by: Droupadi Murmu
- Preceded by: M. S. Ramachandra Rao; S. N. Prasad (acting)
- Succeeded by: M. S. Sonak

Judge of Himachal Pradesh High Court
- In office 23 February 2014 – 22 July 2025
- Nominated by: P. Sathasivam
- Appointed by: Pranab Mukherjee
- Acting Chief Justice
- In office 19 October 2024 – 28 December 2024
- Appointed by: Droupadi Murmu
- Preceded by: Rajiv Shakdher
- Succeeded by: G. S. Sandhawalia
- In office 20 April 2023 – 29 May 2023
- Appointed by: Droupadi Murmu
- Preceded by: A. A. Sayed; Sabina (acting)
- Succeeded by: M. S. Ramachandra Rao

Personal details
- Born: 9 January 1964 (age 62) Rohru
- Education: LL.B
- Alma mater: Bishop Cotton School, Shimla, DAV College, Chandigarh, Panjab University

Tarlok Singh Chauhan (born 9 January 1964) is a retired Indian judge who served as the 17th Chief Justice of Jharkhand High Court. He is also former Judge of the Himachal Pradesh High Court where he also served as the Acting Chief Justice twice.

== Early life and career ==
Justice Chauhan was born on 9 January 1964 at Rohru, Himachal Pradesh. He completed his schooling from Bishop Cotton School, Shimla and graduation from DAV College, Chandigarh while he did his LL.B from Panjab University. He was enrolled as an advocate with Bar Council of Himachal Pradesh in 1989 and joined the chamber of Lala Chhabil Das, Advocate General of Himachal Pradesh. He was appointed as additional judge of Himachal Pradesh High Court on 23 February 2014 and was made permanent on 30 November 2014 where he also served as acting chief justice twice in 2023 and in 2024

On 26 May 2025, the Supreme Court collegium recommended his appointment as chief justice of Jharkhand High Court and he was appointed in July 2025 and took oath as Jharkhand's Chief Justice on 23 July 2025. He retired from the office on 8 January 2026.
