= T. V. R. Tatachari =

6th Chief Justice of Delhi High Court

Hon'ble Chief Justice (Retd.) Tirumala Venkata Ranga Tatachari
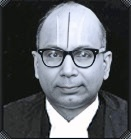

1st Lokayukta of Himachal Pradesh
- In office 17 August 1983 – 16 August 1988
- Appointed by: Hokishe Sema
- Preceded by: Position established
- Succeeded by: Ram Briskha Mishra

6th Chief Justice of Delhi High Court
- In office 4 June 1974 – 15 October 1978
- Appointed by: V. V. Giri
- Preceded by: Narain Andley
- Succeeded by: Vasant Shamrao Deshpande

Judge of Delhi High Court
- In office 4 January 1967 – 3 June 1974
- Nominated by: Koka Subba Rao
- Appointed by: S. Radhakrishnan

Personal details
- Born: 16 October 1916 Vijayanagaram, Andhra Pradesh, India
- Died: 1 June 2001 (aged 84) New Delhi, India
- Spouse: Ranganayaki Vinjamuri
- Education: B.Sc and LL.B
- Alma mater: Maharajah's College, University of Madras

Tirumala Venkata Ranga Tatachari (16 October 1916 – 1 June 2001) was an Indian jurist who served as the 6th Chief Justice of the Delhi High Court and later became the 1st Lokayukta of Himachal Pradesh.

== Education ==
Tatachari was born on 16 October 1916 at Vizianagaram, in present-day Andhra Pradesh. He completed his B.Sc. from Maharajah's College, Vizianagaram, in 1935, and LL.B from Madras University in 1938. He enrolled as an advocate in the Madras High Court on 26 February 1940. He practised before the Madras High Court and the Supreme Court of India. From April 1965, he also served as Advocate-on-Record for the State of Andhra Pradesh in the Supreme Court.

== Career ==
Tatachari was appointed a part-time lecturer in the Faculty of Law, University of Delhi in November 1963 and taught here till his elevation to the bench. He was appointed as Judge of the Delhi High Court on 4 January 1967. He became Chief Justice of the Delhi High Court on 4 June 1974 and served as such until his retirement on 16 October 1978.

During his tenure, the new Delhi High Court building, which is currently the seat of Delhi High Court, was inaugurated on 26 September 1976 by President of India Fakhruddin Ali Ahmed. He was also credited for appointing Leila Seth as the first woman judge of the Delhi High Court. In a later interview, Justice Seth recalled that Tatachari had asked her to join the Bench.

== Post retirement ==
After his retirement as Chief Justice, Tatachari returned to public service. In 1983, he was appointed the first Lokayukta of Himachal Pradesh, making him the inaugural holder of an anti-corruption and public-grievance office in the state. He served in this position for approximately four years, until 1988 and was succeeded by Justice R. B. Mishra, retired supreme court judge. Subsequent to that role he retired and continued to stay at his New Delhi residence until his death on 1 June 2001. Himachal Pradesh was one of the first states to appoint Lokayukta in 1983 when the then government headed by Chief Minister Virbhadra Singh passed the Lokayukta Act
