= Swatanter Kumar =

Indian judge (born 1947)

Chairperson of the National Green Tribunal
- In office 20 December 2012 – 19 December 2017
- Appointed by: Manmohan Singh

Judge of the Supreme Court of India
- In office 18 December 2009 – 19 December 2012
- Nominated by: K. G. Balakrishnan
- Appointed by: Pratibha Patil

Chief Justice of the Bombay High Court
- In office 31 March 2007 – 17 December 2009
- Nominated by: K. G. Balakrishnan
- Appointed by: A. P. J. Abdul Kalam

Judge of the Delhi High Court
- In office 4 October 2004 – 30 March 2007
- Nominated by: Ramesh Chandra Lahoti
- Appointed by: A. P. J. Abdul Kalam

Judge of the Punjab and Haryana High Court
- In office 30 November 1994 – 3 October 2004
- Nominated by: Aziz Mushabber Ahmadi
- Appointed by: Shankar Dayal Sharma

Judge of the Delhi High Court
- In office 10 November 1994 – 29 November 1994
- Nominated by: Aziz Mushabber Ahmadi
- Appointed by: Shankar Dayal Sharma

Personal details
- Born: 31 December 1947 (age 78)

Swatanter Kumar is a retired justice of the Supreme Court of India and former chairperson of the National Green Tribunal. He is also former chief justice of Bombay High Court and judge of the Delhi High Court and the Punjab and Haryana High Court.

== Biography ==
Kumar enrolled as an advocate with the Delhi Bar Council on 12 July 1971. He practiced in various high courts, tribunals and the Supreme Court, and served as an additional district & sessions judge in the Himachal Pradesh High Court from February 1983 till his resignation in October 1983, and thereafter resumed practice at New Delhi. He was appointed an additional judge of the Delhi High Court on 10 November 1994, transferred to the Punjab and Haryana High Court on 30 November 1994, and was appointed a permanent judge on 30 November 1995. He transferred to Delhi on 4 October 2004 and was appointed Chief Justice of the Bombay High Court on 31 March 2007.

Kumar's appointment to the Supreme Court by then President Pratibha Patil was announced by the Law and Justice Ministry in December 2009.

He was appointed the chairperson of National Green Tribunal on 20 December 2012 and retired on 20 December 2017.

== Sexual harassment allegations ==
In 2014, a law intern alleged that Kumar sexually harassed her. Justice Kumar said that the allegations were a part of a "malicious conspiracy to damage his reputation".
