= Ramesh Surajmal Garg =

32nd Chief Justice of Gauhati High Court

Hon'ble Chief Justice (Retd.) Ramesh Surajmal Garg
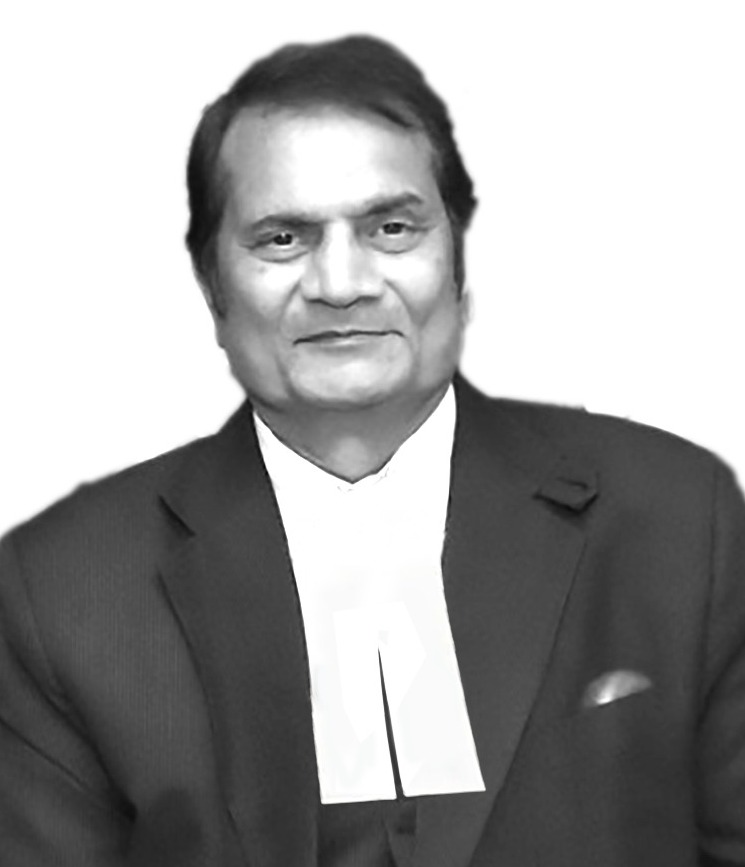

32nd Chief Justice of Gauhati High Court
- In office 17 April 2010 – 18 June 2010
- Nominated by: K. G. Balakrishnan
- Appointed by: Pratibha Patil
- Preceded by: Jasti Chelameswar; Ranjan Gogoi (acting)
- Succeeded by: Madan Lokur; Ranjan Gogoi (acting)

Judge of Madhya Pradesh High Court
- In office 17 September 2007 – 16 April 2010
- Nominated by: K. G. Balakrishnan
- Appointed by: Pratibha Patil
- Acting Chief Justice
- In office 16 November 2009 – 19 December 2009
- Appointed by: Pratibha Patil
- Preceded by: A. K. Patnaik
- Succeeded by: Syed Rafat Alam

Judge of Gujarat High Court
- In office 28 February 2005 – 16 September 2007
- Nominated by: R. C. Lahoti
- Appointed by: A. P. J. Abdul Kalam

Judge of Patna High Court
- In office 1 November 2001 – 27 February 2005
- Nominated by: A. S. Anand
- Appointed by: K. R. Narayanan

Judge of Chhattisgarh High Court
- In office 1 November 2000 – 31 October 2001
- Appointed by: K. R. Narayanan
- Acting Chief Justice
- In office 1 November 2000 – 4 December 2000
- Appointed by: K. R. Narayanan
- Preceded by: Position established
- Succeeded by: W. A. Shishak

Judge of Madhya Pradesh High Court
- In office 15 December 1994 – 31 October 2000
- Nominated by: A. M. Ahmadi
- Appointed by: S. D. Sharma

Personal details
- Born: 18 June 1948 (age 78)
- Parent: Surajmal Garg
- Education: M. A. in Economics
- Alma mater: Indore Christian College

Ramesh Surajmal Garg (born: 18 June 1948), also known as R. S. Garg, is a retired Indian judge and a former Chief Justice of Gauhati High Court. He is well known for serving as the first acting chief justice of Chhattisgarh High Court upon its inauguration.

== Early life and education ==
Garg was born on 18 June 1948. He was raised in an influential legal environment; his father, Surajmal Garg, was a highly regarded advocate who served as the Advocate General of the State of Madhya Pradesh from 11 July 1977 to 13 March 1980. Garg pursued his foundational schooling across Indore and Mhow before entering collegiate education at Indore Christian College. Demonstrating a strong intellectual aptitude, he earned a Master of Arts in Economics with a First Division distinction in 1970, followed swiftly by the completion of his formal legal qualifications to secure his law examinations in 1971. He balanced his early professional ascent with his personal life, marrying Anubhaji—a registered advocate—in 1975, with whom he raised a son Ritwik and a daughter Richa.

== Career ==
Upon formal entry to the legal bar in 1971, Garg cultivated a highly versatile and expansive practice spanning over two decades. His courtroom advocacy covered nearly every facet of the legal landscape, including civil, criminal, revenue, constitutional, taxation, labor, cooperative, excise, and customs law. In addition to representing individual clients, he routinely defended municipal bodies, private corporations, and specialized state institutions; notably, he operated as the designated Standing Counsel for the State Electricity Board continuously from 1977 to 1994. His deep command of procedural and substantive law culminated in his elevation to the higher judiciary when he was appointed as an Additional Judge of the Madhya Pradesh High Court on 15 December 1994. He was later confirmed as a permanent Judge on 19 July 1995.

== First Acting Chief Justice of Chhattisgarh High Court ==
The creation of the state of Chhattisgarh under the Madhya Pradesh Reorganisation Act, 2000, necessitated the immediate establishment of an independent judicial architecture. Garg was selected as the foundational figure to steer this critical transition, becoming the historic first Acting Chief Justice of the Chhattisgarh High Court. On 1 November 2000, as the new state was officially carved out of Madhya Pradesh, the High Court of Chhattisgarh at Bilaspur was established as the 19th High Court of India. Justice Garg, who had been serving as a permanent judge at the Madhya Pradesh High Court since 19 July 1995, was transferred by presidential order to lead this newly minted judicial entity.

Operating as the state’s highest judicial officer, Garg immediately executed vital constitutional functions to launch the regional government. In the early hours of 1 November 2000 in the capital of Raipur, he administered the oath of office to Dinesh Nandan Sahaya, who took charge as the first Governor of Chhattisgarh. Following the executive swearing-in, Garg presided over the formal inauguration ceremony of the High Court at Bilaspur, sharing the dais with Supreme Court Judge Justice B. N. Kirpal (Later CJI), Union Law Minister Arun Jaitley, Madhya Pradesh Chief Justice Bhawani Singh, and the first Chief Minister of Chhattisgarh, Ajit Jogi.

Garg's administrative responsibilities involved organizing the primary roster, allocating judicial portfolios, and managing the logistical transition of assets and files between Jabalpur and Bilaspur. He served actively as the Acting Chief Justice from 1 November 2000 until 4 December 2000, managing institutional setups until W. A. Shishak arrived as the high court’s first permanent Chief Justice. Following the handover, Garg continued to serve the Chhattisgarh High Court as its senior-most judge, remaining on the Bilaspur bench until 31 October 2001, after which he was transferred to the Patna High Court and later to Gujarat High Court on 28 February 2005.

== Later career ==
Garg was repatriated to his home cadre at the Madhya Pradesh High Court on 17 September 2007. His seniority and administrative capabilities were called upon once again on 16 November 2009, when he was appointed as the Acting Chief Justice of the Madhya Pradesh High Court. This elevation occurred as a consequence of the promotion of the then incumbent Chief Justice, Ananga Kumar Patnaik, to the Supreme Court of India. Shortly thereafter, his career reached its apex when he was officially elevated to the post of Chief Justice of the Gauhati High Court on 17 April 2010. As Chief Justice, he presided over an expansive legal jurisdiction encompassing multiple north eastern states, offering administrative stability and clear jurisprudence during a brief but notable two-month tenure before reaching the mandatory constitutional age of superannuation and retiring from the bench later that same year on 18 June 2010.

== Post retirement ==
Following his formal retirement from active judicial service, Garg redirected his focus toward legal education and academic mentorship. Settling in Indore, he served as a key institutional guide and chancellor figure, actively steering the development of Oriental University and the Oriental School of Law to train successive generations of legal practitioners. His long-standing contributions to the Indian legal system were formally celebrated when he was honored with the Bharat Kirtiman Alankaran award.

In his later years, Garg briefly returned to public attention due to a security breach at his private residence. In August 2025, an assertive robbery and theft attempt was executed at his Indore home. The incident drew widespread coverage and public concern from regional authorities, primarily because the perpetrators managed to breach the perimeter and target the property despite the constant presence of deployed government security personnel assigned to the retired jurist's household. The subsequent police investigation highlighted ongoing conversations regarding the adequacy of protection protocols afforded to retired high-ranking members of the state judiciary.
