= Vikramajit Sen =

Indian judge (born 1950)

Chairman of the Bombay Stock Exchange
- In office 22 May 2019 – 17 May 2022
- Preceded by: Sethuraman Ravi
- Succeeded by: S. S. Mundra

Judge, Supreme Court of India
- In office 24 December 2012 – 30 December 2015
- Appointed by: Pranab Mukherjee (President of India)

Chief Justice, Karnataka High Court
- In office 24 December 2011 – 24 December 2012
- Appointed by: Pranab Mukherjee (President of India)
- Preceded by: Jagdish Singh Khehar
- Succeeded by: Dhirendra Hiralal Waghela

Personal details
- Born: 31 December 1950 (age 75)
- Education: Graduation
- Alma mater: Campus Law Centre, Faculty of Law, University of Delhi

Vikramajit Sen (born 31 December 1950) is a retired Indian judge, who served as a judge of the Supreme Court of India from 2012 to 2015. He has also served as the Chief Justice of the Karnataka High Court from 2011 to 2012. From May 2019 to May 2022, he served as the chairman of the Bombay Stock Exchange.

== Education ==
Sen was born into a Bengali Baidya Brahmin family. Sen pursued law from the prestigious Campus Law Centre of the Faculty of Law, University of Delhi. He graduated in History from St. Stephen's College, Delhi.

== Career ==
On 7 July 1999, Sen was appointed an additional judge of the Delhi High Court and on 30 October 2000, he was appointed a permanent judge. On 12 September 2011 he was transferred to Karnataka High Court as an acting Chief Justice and subsequently on 24 December 2011, he assumed office as Chief Justice of the Karnataka High Court. On 24 December 2012, he was elevated and appointed a judge at the Supreme Court of India.

He is also the chairman of the three-member panel to investigate sexual harassment charges against S K Gangele, a sitting judge of the Madhya Pradesh High Court.

From May 2019 to May 2022, for a terms of 3 years, he served as the chairman of the Bombay Stock Exchange. On 18 May 2022, he was succeeded by former RBI Deputy Governor S. S. Mundra.
