= Makani Narayana Rao =

Indian judge

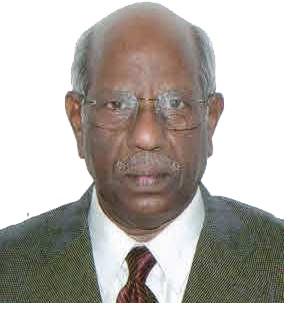
Justice Mr. Makani Narayana Rao

Justice Makani Narayana "M. N." Rao (born 22 April 1936) is a retired Indian judge, a former Chief Justice of Himachal Pradesh, and former chairman of the National Commission on Backward Classes.

Rao enrolled as an advocate of the Andhra Pradesh High Court on 9 October 1961. He practiced before the court for more than 12 years, specializing in constitutional law. In 1979, Rao was appointed a legal secretary of the government of Andhra Pradesh, and was appointed a selection grade district judge on 25 July 1983.

Rao became Chairman of the Sales Tax Appellate Tribunal on 1 July 1985. He was later appointed a permanent judge of the Andhra Pradesh High Court on 11 July 1986. Rao was appointed Chief Justice of the Himachal Pradesh High Court on 6 November 1997. He retired on 22 April 1998;Currently living in Hyderabad, India.
