= W. A. Shishak =

1st Chief Justice of Chhattisgarh High Court

Hon'ble Chief Justice (Retd.) Wungazan Awungshi Shishak

17th Chief Justice of Himachal Pradesh High Court
- In office 24 January 2002 – 31 December 2002
- Nominated by: S. P. Bharucha
- Appointed by: K. R. Narayanan
- Preceded by: C. K. Thakker; Kamlesh Sharma (acting)
- Succeeded by: V. K. Gupta; Kamlesh Sharma (acting)

1st Chief Justice of Chhattisgarh High Court
- In office 5 December 2000 – 15 January 2002
- Nominated by: A. S. Anand
- Appointed by: K. R. Narayanan
- Preceded by: Position established; R. S. Garg (acting)
- Succeeded by: K. H. N. Kuranga; Fakhruddin (acting)

Judge of Gauhati High Court
- In office 2 January 1989 – 4 December 2000
- Nominated by: R. S. Pathak
- Appointed by: R. Venkataraman

Personal details
- Born: 1 January 1941 Ukhrul District, Manipur
- Died: 3 August 2023 (aged 82) Regional Institute of Medical Sciences, Imphal
- Education: Gauhati University and Delhi University (LL.B)
- Occupation: Lawyer, Judge

Wungazan Awungshi Shishak (1 January 1941–3 August 2023) was an Indian judge who is remembered above all as the first Chief Justice of the High Court of Chhattisgarh, a newly established High Court created following the formation of the State of Chhattisgarh in 2000. His career was also historically significant because, according to the inaugural proceedings preserved by the Chhattisgarh High Court, he was the first Naga to become a High Court judge after Independence and the first Chief Justice from among the Naga and tribal communities of India.

== Early life and education ==
Shishak was born on 1 January 1941 at Shangshak village in Ukhrul district of Manipur. His higher education took him outside Manipur. He completed his graduation from Gauhati University in 1963 and thereafter obtained his Bachelor of Laws degree from the University of Delhi in 1965. These two stages of his education laid the foundation for a legal career that would subsequently connect the judicial institutions of Assam, Nagaland, Chhattisgarh and Himachal Pradesh.

== Legal and judicial career ==
After completing his legal education, Shishak began practising in the Gauhati High Court in March 1967. His early professional career was thus formed within the legal environment of the North-East, where the Gauhati High Court occupied a particularly important position because of its historical jurisdiction over a number of States and territories of the region. In 1970, he shifted his professional base to Nagaland. The move became a decisive stage in his legal career. Over the following years, he emerged as an important member of the legal profession in the State, serving as Senior Government Advocate for the Government of Nagaland for seven years and also becoming President of the Nagaland Bar Association. These positions gave him experience both in government litigation and in the organised legal profession and established the professional foundation from which he would later be elevated to the Bench.

Shishak was elevated as a Judge of the Gauhati High Court on 2 January 1989. He thereafter served on that Court for almost twelve years, until his appointment as Chief Justice of the newly established High Court of Chhattisgarh in December 2000.

His judicial work at the Gauhati High Court covered a broad range of legal questions. His reported decisions included criminal cases involving the evidentiary value of dying declarations, constitutional and administrative matters, civil disputes and cases arising from the distinctive customary-law institutions of Nagaland. This breadth is significant because his judicial career cannot properly be understood merely through his later Chief Justiceships: the greater part of his years on the Bench was spent as a Judge of the Gauhati High Court, where he encountered the complex constitutional and legal environment of the North-East.

== Chief Justice of Chhattisgarh ==
The most historically significant phase of Shishak's career began with the creation of the State of Chhattisgarh. Following the reorganisation of Madhya Pradesh, Chhattisgarh came into existence on 1 November 2000, and a separate High Court was established for the new State.

Shishak was selected to become the first Chief Justice of the High Court of Chhattisgarh. The Gauhati High Court's official biographical record states that he was elevated to the post of Chief Justice of the Chhattisgarh High Court on 4 December 2000, while the Chhattisgarh High Court's official succession list records his tenure as commencing on 5 December 2000 and continuing until 15 January 2002.

His appointment was of particular institutional significance because he was not merely succeeding an earlier Chief Justice. He was assuming leadership of an entirely new constitutional court. The Chhattisgarh High Court's inaugural proceedings expressly welcomed him as its first Chief Justice, while the then Acting Chief Justice R. S. Garg's address recalled his long professional association with the North-East and his pioneering position as a Naga jurist.

Justice Shishak himself used his inaugural address to emphasise the importance of cooperation between the Bar and the Bench. He described them as “two sides of one coin” and stated that the High Court could not move forward without cooperation between the two. The observation was especially relevant to the circumstances in which he assumed office. A newly established High Court required not only the disposal of cases but also the development of institutional relationships between judges, advocates, judicial officers and court administration.

During his tenure as the first Chief Justice, he continued to participate actively in the judicial work of the Court. His reported decisions from the early period of the Chhattisgarh High Court include criminal matters and questions concerning bail and property seized in criminal proceedings. His decisions of form part of the earliest reported judicial work of the Chhattisgarh High Court under its first Chief Justice.

=== As Himachal Pradesh Chief Justice ===
After leaving Chhattisgarh, Shishak was appointed Chief Justice of the Himachal Pradesh High Court on 24 January 2002. His career consequently included the leadership of two different High Courts after his long tenure as a Judge of the Gauhati High Court. This progression—from practice and government advocacy in the North-East, to the Gauhati High Court, to the first Chief Justiceship of a newly established High Court and finally to the Chief Justiceship of another High Court—was remarkable for its geographical and institutional range.

During his tenure in Himachal Pradesh, Justice Shishak continued to participate in the work of Division Benches dealing with a variety of matters, including civil, service, compensation and commercial questions. His leadership of the Himachal Pradesh High Court also coincided with an early stage in the development of the Court's digital public presence; a National Informatics Centre publication recorded that the official website of the Himachal Pradesh High Court had been launched by Chief Justice W. A. Shishak.

== Notable judgements ==
=== At Gauhati High Court ===
In Masaddar Ali and another v. State of Assam, Justice Shishak dealt with the evidentiary value of a dying declaration in a criminal appeal. The judgment recognised that a reliable dying declaration could constitute substantive evidence but stressed the necessity of careful judicial scrutiny where circumstances created doubts about its reliability. On the facts before the Court, the Bench concluded that the prosecution case against the appellants could not be satisfactorily distinguished from that against other accused persons who had been discharged, and the convictions were accordingly set aside.

His judicial work also included constitutional and administrative questions. In S. A. Ahluwalia v. State of Nagaland and others, he dealt with a petition involving the transfer of jurisdiction for the income-tax assessment of an Indian Administrative Service officer, illustrating the range of public-law matters that came before him during his service in the Gauhati High Court.

Justice Shishak also heard cases connected with the customary and local legal institutions of Nagaland. In Longrichiba Ao and others v. Ungerchang Masomer and others, he dealt with a dispute involving land and proceedings arising from the District Dobashi Customary Law Court at Mokokchung. Such cases formed an important part of the legal environment in which he worked, placing the High Court's jurisdiction alongside legal systems and institutions shaped by local customary practices.

=== At Chhattisgarh High Court ===
In Gopi alias Gopal v. State of Chhattisgarh, a Division Bench on which Justice Shishak sat considered the relationship between eyewitness testimony and medical evidence in a homicide case. The Court maintained the conclusion that the appellant was responsible for the death but altered the legal characterisation of the offence from murder punishable under Section 302 of the Indian Penal Code to culpable homicide punishable under Section 304 Part I, with a corresponding modification of sentence.

== Retirement, death and legacy ==
Justice Shishak retired from judicial office on 1 January 2003. His retirement brought to a close a legal and judicial career extending over more than three decades—from his entry into legal practice in 1967, through his years in Nagaland, his nearly twelve-year tenure as a Judge of the Gauhati High Court, and his subsequent service as Chief Justice of both the Chhattisgarh and Himachal Pradesh High Courts.

He died on 3 August 2023, aged eighty-two. His death was formally acknowledged by the High Court of Chhattisgarh, which issued notice for a Full Court Reference in memory of Late Hon'ble Shri Justice W. A. Shishak, former Chief Justice of the High Court of Chhattisgarh. That institutional commemoration reflected the continuing importance of his association with the Court more than two decades after he had served as its first Chief Justice.

Justice Shishak occupies a distinctive position in the history of the Indian judiciary. His importance rests first upon his pioneering place among jurists from the North-East. The Chhattisgarh High Court's inaugural proceedings described him as the first Naga to become a High Court judge after Independence and as the first Chief Justice from among the Naga and tribal communities.

His most enduring institutional distinction, however, remains his appointment as the first Chief Justice of the High Court of Chhattisgarh. As the first permanent judicial head of a newly established High Court, he stands at the beginning of the Court's succession of Chief Justices and occupies a foundational place in its institutional history.

His career also illustrates an unusually broad geographical journey through the Indian legal system. Born in Manipur, educated at Gauhati and Delhi, practising first in Assam and then in Nagaland, serving as a judge of the Gauhati High Court, becoming the first Chief Justice of Chhattisgarh and later leading the Himachal Pradesh High Court, Justice Shishak's professional life connected some of the most geographically and institutionally diverse parts of the Indian judiciary.

His legacy therefore cannot be confined to a single High Court. It lies in his pioneering role as a jurist from the North-East, his substantial period of judicial work in the Gauhati High Court, his foundational role in the early institutional history of the Chhattisgarh High Court and his later leadership of the Himachal Pradesh High Court. Yet when the history of the Chhattisgarh High Court is considered, his place remains singular: Justice W. A. Shishak was not merely among its early Chief Justices—he was its first Chief Justice.
