= Delhi High Court =

High Court in India

- Interactive map of Delhi High Court
- 28.6090°N 77.2361°E
- Established: 31 October 1966; 60 years ago
- Jurisdiction: Delhi
- Location: Shershah Road, Justice SB Marg, New Delhi
- Coordinates: 28.6090°N 77.2361°E
- Composition method: Presidential with confirmation of Chief Justice of India
- Website: delhihighcourt.nic.in

Chief Justice
- Currently: Nitin Wasudeo Sambre (ACJ)
- Since: 6 October 2026

The High Court of Delhi is the principal judicial authority for state in Delhi, in the National Capital Region, India. It was established on 31 October 1966, through the Delhi High Court Act, 1966. Below it are 11 subordinate courts that oversee smaller judicial districts. The court gets its powers from Chapter V of Part VI of the Constitution of India.

== History ==
Established in 1919, the High Court of Judicature at Lahore exercised jurisdiction over the then provinces of Punjab and Delhi. This continued until the Indian Independence Act 1947, establishing the dominions of India and Pakistan.

On 15 August 1947, the High Courts (Punjab) Order, 1947 established a new High Court for the territory of what was then East Punjab. The India (Adaptation of Existing Indian Laws) Order, 1947 provided that any reference in an existing Indian law to the High Court of Judicature at Lahore be replaced by a reference to the High Court of East Punjab.

The High Court of East Punjab started functioning from Shimla in a building called "Peterhoff". This building burnt down in January 1981.

When the Secretariat of the Punjab Government shifted to Chandigarh in 1954–55, the High Court also shifted to Chandigarh. The High Court of Punjab, as it was later called, exercised jurisdiction over Delhi through a Circuit Bench which dealt with the cases pertaining to the Union Territory of Delhi and the Delhi Administration.

In view of the importance of Delhi, its population and other considerations, the Indian Parliament thought it was necessary to establish a new High Court of Delhi. This was achieved by enacting the Delhi High Court Act, 1966 on 5 September 1966.

The High Court of Delhi initially exercised jurisdiction not only over the Union Territory of Delhi, but also Himachal Pradesh. It had a Himachal Pradesh Bench at Shimla in a building called Ravenswood. The High Court of Delhi continued to exercise jurisdiction over Himachal Pradesh until the State of Himachal Pradesh Act, 1970 was enforced on 25 January 1971.

== Chief Justice and Judges ==
The Chief Justice of the High Court of Delhi is appointed by the President of India, in consultation with the Chief Justice of India. During the appointment, the Chief Justice of India is required to consult with the two senior-most judges of the Supreme Court. For all other High Courts in India, the Chief Justices are appointed by the President of India, as provided under Article 217 of the Constitution, in consultation with the Chief Justice of India and the Governor of the State. The Chief Justice is the senior-most sitting judge of the High Court in a State. Besides performing judicial functions, he/she also exercises administrative powers, as provided under Article 229 of the Constitution of India.

The current acting Chief Justice of this court is Justice Nitin Wasudeo Sambre. He was appointed on 21 January 2025.

=== Judges of the Delhi High Court ===
The Judges of the High Court of Delhi (other than the Chief Justice of the Delhi High Court) are appointed by the President by warrant under his hand and seal after consultation with the Chief Justice of India, and on the recommendation of the Chief Justice of the High Court of Delhi. The Chief Justice of India is required to consult with the two senior-most judges of the Supreme Court. The Chief Justice of the High Court is also required to consult his two senior-most puisne Judges before recommending a name for appointment to the High Court. The Judges of the Delhi High Court are guided by the code of ethics as stated in the ‘Restatement of Values of Judicial Life’ adopted by the Supreme Court of India, vide its resolution dated 7 May 1997.

Currently, the sanctioned strength of Judges of the High Court of Delhi is 45 permanent Judges and 15 Additional Judges. Following is the list of sitting Judges of the High Court of Delhi:

== Original side civil jurisdiction ==
The High Court of Delhi is territory. This means that civil cases can be filed directly in the High Court, whereas the High Court generally only has appellate civil jurisdiction otherwise. The other High Courts which have original side jurisdiction are Bombay, Calcutta and Madras.

== Backlog ==
As per the report released on 2006–08, Delhi High court has a long list of pending cases. The backlog is such that it would take 466 years to resolve them. In a bid to restore public trust and confidence, Delhi court spent 5 minutes per case and disposed of 94,000 cases in 2008–10.

== Former Chief Justices ==
#	Image	Chief Justices	Tenure	
#	Image	Chief Justices	Start	End
1		Kowdoor Sadananda Hegde	31 Oct 1966	16 Jul 1967
2		Inder Dev Dua	17 Jul 1967	01 Aug 1969
3		Hans Raj Khanna	01 Aug 1969	22 Sep 1970
4		Hardayal Hardy	22 Sep 1971	15 May 1972
5		Narain Andley	15 May 1972	04 Jun 1974
6		Tirumala Venkata Ranga Tatachari	04 Jun 1974	16 Oct 1978
7		Vasant Shamrao Deshpande	16 Oct 1978	27 Mar 1980
8		Prakash Narain	08 Jan 1981	06 Aug 1985
9		Rajinder Sachar	06 Aug 1985	22 Dec 1985
10		Dalip Kumar Kapur	22 Dec 1985	20 Aug 1986
11		Tejinder Pal Singh Chawla	20 Aug 1986	16 Aug 1987
12		Rajendra Nath Aggarwal	16 Aug 1987	21 Aug 1987
13		Yogeshwar Dayal	21 Aug 1987	18 Mar 1988
14		Rabindranth Pyne	18 Mar 1988	28 Sep 1990
15		Milap Chand Jain	28 Nov 1990	21 Jul 1991
16		Gokal Chand Mittal	05 Aug 1991	04 Mar 1994
17		Mamidanna Jagannadha Rao	12 Apr 1994	21 Mar 1997
18		Ajay Prakash Misra	21 Mar 1997	30 Dec 1999
19		Sam Nariman Variava	31 Dec 1999	15 Mar 2000
20		Arijit Pasayat	10 May 2000	19 Oct 2001
21		Satyabrata Sinha	26 Nov 2001	01 Oct 2002
22		Babulal Chandulal Patel	05 Mar 2003	07 Aug 2005
23		Markandey Katju	12 Oct 2005	10 Apr 2006
24		Mukundakam Sharma	04 Dec 2006	09 Apr 2008
25		Ajit Prakash Shah	11 May 2008	12 Feb 2010
26	Dipak Misra	Dipak Misra	24 May 2010	10 Oct 2011
27		Darmar Murugesan	26 Sep 2012	10 Jun 2013
-		Badar Durrez Ahmed (acting)	10 Jun 2013	01 Sept 2013
28	N. V. Ramana	Nuthalapati Venkata Ramana	02 Sep 2013	16 Feb 2014
-		Badar Durrez Ahmed (acting)	17 Feb 2014	20 Apr 2014
29		Gorla Rohini	21 Apr 2014	13 Apr 2017
-		Gita Mittal (acting)	14 Apr 2017	10 Aug 2018
30		Rajendra Menon	11 Aug 2018	06 Jun 2019
31		Dhirubhai Naranbhai Patel	07 Jun 2019	12 Mar 2022
-		Vipin Sanghi (acting)	13 Mar 2022	27 Jun 2022
32		Satish Chandra Sharma	28 Jun 2022	08 Nov 2023
-		Manmohan (acting)	09 Nov 2023	28 Sep 2024
33		Manmohan	29 Sep 2024	04 Dec 2024
-		Vibhu Bakhru (acting)	05 Dec 2024	20 January 2025
34		Devendra Kumar Upadhyaya	21 Jan 2025	05 Oct 2026

== Judges elevated as Chief Justices ==
This sections contains list of only those judges elevated as chief justices whose parent high court is Delhi. This includes those judges who, at the time of appointment as chief justice, may not be serving in Delhi High Court but this list does not include judges who at the time of appointment as chief justice were serving in Delhi High Court but does not have Delhi as their Parent High Court.

Colour Key

- Female Chief Justice
- Served as Chief Justice of India

Symbol Key

- ^{‡} Elevated to Supreme Court of India
- ^{RES} Resigned
- ^{†} Died in office

Name	Image	Appointed as CJ in HC of	Date of appointment		Date of retirement (Note: this includes date of resignation, death and elevation to supreme court)	Tenure	
Name	Image	Appointed as CJ in HC of	As Judge	As Chief Justice	Date of retirement	As Chief Justice	As Judge (Note: also includes tenure as Chief Justice)
Hardayal Hardy		Delhi	4 January 1967	23 September 1971	14 May 1972	235 days	5 years, 132 days
Narain Andley		Delhi	4 January 1967	15 May 1972	3 June 1974	2 years, 20 days	7 years, 151 days
Tirumala Venkata Ranga Tatachari		Delhi	4 January 1967	4 June 1974	15 October 1978	4 years, 134 days	11 years, 285 days
Muhammad Kassim Muhammad Ismail		Madras	20 February 1967	6 November 1979	9 July 1981^{[RES]}	1 year, 246 days	14 years, 140 days
Siba Narain Sankar		Orissa	25 May 1967	1 November 1975	12 October 1977	1 year, 346 days	10 years, 141 days
Vasant Shamrao Deshpande		Delhi	30 April 1968	16 October 1978	26 June 1980	1 year, 255 days	12 years, 58 days
Prakash Narain		Delhi	20 January 1969	8 January 1981	5 August 1985	4 years, 210 days	16 years, 198 days
Muhammed Rafeeudin Ahmed Ansari		Jammu & Kashmir	30 July 1969	23 January 1976	8 November 1977	1 year, 290 days	8 years, 102 days
Vyas Dev Misra		Himachal Pradesh	30 July 1969	12 December 1979	30 September 1983	3 years, 293 days	14 years, 63 days
Rajinder Sachar		Delhi	12 February 1970	6 August 1985	21 December 1985	138 days	15 years, 313 days
Dalip Kumar Kapur		Delhi	4 November 1970	22 December 1985	19 August 1986	241 days	15 years, 289 days
Tejinder Pal Singh Chawla		Delhi	6 January 1972	26 September 1986	15 August 1987	324 days	15 years, 222 days
Rajendra Nath Aggarwal		Delhi	7 March 1972 (Note: Appointed as additional judge for 2 year from 7 March 1972 and thereafter relieved from service and again appointed as permanent judge on 7 July 1977 with restored seniority)	16 August 1987	21 August 1987	6 days	12 years, 46 days
Yogeshwar Dayal		Delhi, transferred to Andhra Pradesh	28 February 1974	21 August 1987	21 March 1991^{[‡]}	3 years, 213 days	17 years, 22 days
Leila Seth		Himachal Pradesh	25 July 1978	5 August 1991	19 October 1992	1 year, 76 days	14 years, 87 days
Bhupinder Nath Kirpal		Gujarat	20 November 1979	14 December 1993	10 September 1995^{[‡]}	1 year, 272 days	15 years, 296 days
Devinder Pratap Wadhwa		Patna	12 August 1983	29 September 1995	20 March 1997^{[‡]}	1 year, 173 days	13 years, 221 days
Arun B. Saharya		Punjab & Haryana	24 April 1986	7 November 1997	14 September 2002	4 years, 312 days	16 years, 144 days
Yogesh Kumar Sabharwal		Bombay	17 November 1986	3 February 1999	28 January 2000^{[‡]}	360 days	13 years, 73 days
Arun Kumar		Rajasthan	13 July 1990	2 December 2001	2 October 2002^{[‡]}	305 days	12 years, 82 days
Anil Dev Singh		Rajasthan	13 July 1990	24 December 2002	22 October 2004	1 year, 304 days	14 years, 102 days
Dalveer Bhandari		Bombay	19 March 1991	25 July 2004	27 October 2005^{[‡]}	1 year, 95 days	14 years, 223 days
Devinder Kumar Jain		Punjab & Haryana	19 March 1991	11 March 2005	9 April 2006^{[‡]}	1 year, 30 days	15 years, 22 days
Vijender Jain		Punjab & Haryana	24 December 1992	28 November 2006	1 August 2008	1 year, 248 days	15 years, 222 days
Swatanter Kumar		Bombay	10 November 1994	31 March 2007	17 December 2009^{[‡]}	2 years, 262 days	15 years, 38 days
Manmohan Sarin		Jammu & Kashmir	17 May 1995	4 September 2008	19 October 2008	46 days	13 years, 156 days
Mukul Mudgal		Punjab & Haryana	2 March 1998	5 December 2009	3 January 2011	1 year, 30 days	12 years, 308 days
Madan Lokur		Gauhati, transferred to Andhra Pradesh	19 February 1999	24 June 2010	3 June 2012^{[‡]}	1 year, 346 days	13 years, 106 days
Vikramajit Sen		Karnataka	7 July 1999	24 December 2011	24 December 2012^{[‡]}	1 year, 1 day	13 years, 170 days
Arjan Kumar Sikri		Punjab & Haryana	7 July 1999	23 September 2012	11 April 2013^{[‡]}	201 days	13 years, 279 days
Sanjay Kishan Kaul		Punjab & Haryana, transferred to Madras	3 May 2001	1 June 2013	16 February 2017^{[‡]}	3 years, 261 days	15 years, 290 days
Badar Durrez Ahmed		Jammu & Kashmir	20 December 2002	1 April 2017	15 March 2018	349 days	15 years, 86 days
Pradeep Nandrajog		Rajasthan, transferred to Bombay	20 December 2002	2 April 2017	23 February 2020	2 years, 328 days	17 years, 66 days
Gita Mittal		Jammu & Kashmir	16 July 2004	11 August 2018	8 December 2020	2 years, 120 days	16 years, 146 days
Shripathi Ravindra Bhat		Rajasthan	16 July 2004	5 May 2019	23 September 2019^{[‡]}	142 days	15 years, 70 days
S. Muralidhar		Orissa	29 May 2006	4 January 2021	7 August 2023	2 years, 216 days	17 years, 71 days
Hima Kohli		Telangana	29 May 2006	7 January 2021	30 August 2021^{[‡]}	236 days	15 years, 94 days
Vipin Sanghi		Uttarakhand	29 May 2006	28 June 2022	26 October 2023	1 year, 121 days	17 years, 151 days
Siddharth Mridul		Manipur	13 March 2008	20 October 2023	21 November 2024	1 year, 33 days	16 years, 254 days
Manmohan		Delhi	13 March 2008	29 September 2024	4 December 2024^{[‡]}	67 days	16 years, 267 days
Rajiv Shakdher		Himachal Pradesh	11 April 2008	25 September 2024	18 October 2024	24 days	16 years, 191 days
Suresh Kumar Kait		Madhya Pradesh	5 September 2008	25 September 2024	23 May 2025	241 days	16 years, 261 days
Sanjeev Sachdeva		Madhya Pradesh	17 April 2013	17 July 2025	1 June 2026^{[‡]}	320 days	13 years, 46 days
Vibhu Bakhru		Karnataka	17 April 2013	19 July 2025	Incumbent	1 year, 117 days	13 years, 210 days
Valluri Kameswar Rao		Patna	17 April 2013	13 September 2026	Incumbent	61 days	13 years, 210 days

=== Judges appointed as Acting Chief Justice ===
Name	Appointed as ACJ in HC of	Date of appointment as Judge	Period as Acting Chief Justice	Date of retirement	Tenure as ACJ	Tenure as Judge	Remarks	Ref..
Prakash Narain	Delhi	20 January 1969	27 Jun 1980 – 7 Jan 1981	5 August 1985	195 days	16 years, 198 days	Became permanent	
Rajinder Sachar	Sikkim	12 February 1970	16 May 1975 – 6 May 1976	21 December 1985	357 days	15 years, 313 days	Transferred to Rajasthan	
Tejinder Pal Singh Chawla	Delhi	6 January 1972	20 Aug 1986 – 25 Sep 1986	15 August 1987	37 days	15 years, 222 days	Became permanent	
Surjit Singh Chadha	Delhi	18 December 1974	19 Mar 1988 – 19 May 1988	1 June 1989	62 days	14 years, 166 days	--	
Leila Seth	Delhi	25 July 1978	9 Oct 1990 – 27 Nov 1990	19 October 1992	50 days	14 years, 87 days	--	
Leila Seth	Delhi	25 July 1978	22 Jul 1991 – 4 Aug 1991	19 October 1992	14 days	14 years, 87 days	Elevated as CJ of Himachal Pradesh	
Mahinder Narain	Delhi	4 July 1985	21 Mar 1997 – 25 Jun 1997	7 February 1999^{[†]}	97 days	13 years, 219 days	--	
Mahinder Narain	Delhi	4 July 1985	4 Dec 1997 – 18 Sep 1998	7 February 1999^{[†]}	289 days	13 years, 219 days	Took leave	
Mahinder Narain	Delhi	4 July 1985	10 Dec 1998 – 17 Jan 1999	7 February 1999^{[†]}	39 days	13 years, 219 days	Took leave and subsequently died	
Y. K. Sabharwal	Delhi	17 November 1986	19 Sep 1998 – 9 Dec 1998	28 January 2000^{[‡]}	82 days	13 years, 73 days	--	
Y. K. Sabharwal	Delhi	17 November 1986	18 Jan 1999 – 2 Feb 1999	28 January 2000^{[‡]}	16 days	13 years, 73 days	Elevated as CJ of Bombay	
Vijender Jain	Delhi	24 December 1992	10 Apr 2006 – 27 Nov 2006	1 August 2008	232 days	15 years, 222 days	Elevated as CJ of Punjab & Haryana	
Madan Lokur	Delhi	19 February 1999	13 Feb 2010 – 23 May 2010	3 June 2012^{[‡]}	100 days	13 years, 106 days	--	
Vikramajit Sen	Karnataka	7 July 1999	13 Sep 2011 – 23 Dec 2011	24 December 2012^{[‡]}	102 days	13 years, 170 days	Became permanent	
A. K. Sikri	Delhi	7 July 1999	10 Oct 2011 – 22 Sep 2012	11 April 2013^{[‡]}	349 days	13 years, 279 days	Elevated as CJ of Punjab & Haryana	
S. K. Kaul	Delhi	3 May 2001	23 Sep 2012 – 25 Sep 2012	16 February 2017^{[‡]}	3 days	15 years, 290 days	--	
B. D. Ahmed	Delhi	20 December 2002	11 Jun 2013 – 1 Sep 2013	15 March 2018	83 days	15 years, 86 days	--	
B. D. Ahmed	Delhi	20 December 2002	17 Feb 2014 – 20 Apr 2014	15 March 2018	63 days	15 years, 86 days	--	
Gita Mittal	Delhi	16 July 2004	14 Apr 2017 – 8 Aug 2018	8 December 2020	1 year, 117 days	16 years, 146 days	Elevated as CJ of Jammu & Kashmir	
Vipin Sanghi	Delhi	29 May 2006	13 Mar 2022 – 27 Jun 2022	26 October 2023	107 days	17 years, 151 days	Elevated as CJ of Uttarakhand	
Manmohan	Delhi	13 March 2008	9 Nov 2023 – 28 Sep 2024	4 December 2024^{[‡]}	325 days	16 years, 267 days	Became permanent	
Sanjeev Sachdeva	Madhya Pradesh	17 April 2013	9 Jul 2024 – 24 Sep 2024	1 June 2026^{[‡]}	78 days	13 years, 46 days	--	
Sanjeev Sachdeva	Madhya Pradesh	17 April 2013	24 May 2025 – 16 Jul 2025	1 June 2026^{[‡]}	54 days	13 years, 46 days	Became permanent	
Vibhu Bakhru	Delhi	17 April 2013	5 Dec 2024 – 20 Jan 2025	Incumbent	47 days	13 years, 210 days	--	
V. Kameswar Rao	Karnataka	17 April 2013	30 May 2025 – 18 Jul 2025	Incumbent	50 days	13 years, 210 days	Transferred to Delhi	

== Judges elevated to Supreme Court ==
This section includes the list of only those judges whose parent high court was Delhi. This includes those judges who, at the time of elevation to Supreme Court of India, may not be serving in Delhi High Court but this list does not include judges who at the time of elevation were serving in Delhi High Court but does not have Delhi as their Parent High Court.

Colour Key

- Female Judge
- Served as Chief Justice of India

Symbol Key

- ^{RES} Resigned
- ^{†} Died in office

#	Name of the Judge	Image	Date of Appointment		Date of Retirement	Tenure			Immediately preceding office
#	Name of the Judge	Image	In Parent High Court	In Supreme Court	Date of Retirement	In High Court(s)	In Supreme Court	Total tenure (Note: Includes both tenure as High Court Judge as well as Supreme Court Judge)	Immediately preceding office
1	Srinivasachar Ranganathan		14 November 1977	5 October 1987	30 October 1992	9 years, 325 days	5 years, 26 days	14 years, 352 days	Judge of Delhi HC
2	Yogeshwar Dayal		28 February 1974	22 March 1991	2 August 1994^{[†]}	17 years, 22 days	3 years, 134 days	20 years, 156 days	CJ of undivided Andhra Pradesh HC
3	Bhupinder Nath Kirpal		20 November 1979	11 September 1995	7 November 2002	15 years, 295 days	7 years, 58 days	22 years, 353 days	13th CJ of Gujarat HC
4	Devinder Pratap Wadhwa		12 August 1983	21 March 1997	4 May 2000	13 years, 221 days	3 years, 45 days	16 years, 267 days	28th CJ of Patna HC
5	Yogesh Kumar Sabharwal		17 November 1986	28 January 2000	13 January 2007	13 years, 73 days	6 years, 351 days	20 years, 76 days	31st CJ of Bombay HC
6	Arun Kumar		13 July 1990	3 October 2002	11 April 2006	12 years, 82 days	3 years, 191 days	15 years, 273 days	23rd CJ of Rajasthan HC
7	Dalveer Bhandari		19 March 1991	28 October 2005	27 April 2012^{[RES]}	14 years, 223 days	6 years, 183 days	21 years, 40 days	34th CJ of Bombay HC
8	Devinder Kumar Jain		19 March 1991	10 April 2006	24 January 2013	15 years, 22 days	6 years, 290 days	21 years, 312 days	26th CJ of Punjab & Haryana HC
9	Swatanter Kumar		10 November 1994	18 December 2009	19 December 2012	15 years, 38 days	3 years, 2 days	18 years, 40 days	37th CJ of Bombay HC
10	Madan Lokur		19 February 1999	4 June 2012	30 December 2018	13 years, 106 days	6 years, 210 days	19 years, 315 days	CJ of undivided Andhra Pradesh HC
11	Vikramajit Sen		7 July 1999	24 December 2012	30 December 2015	13 years, 170 days	3 years, 7 days	16 years, 177 days	26th CJ of Karnataka HC
12	Arjan Kumar Sikri		7 July 1999	12 April 2013	6 March 2019	13 years, 279 days	5 years, 329 days	19 years, 243 days	31st CJ of Punjab & Haryana HC
13	Sanjay Kishan Kaul		3 May 2001	17 February 2017	25 December 2023	15 years, 290 days	6 years, 312 days	22 years, 237 days	38th CJ of Madras HC
14	Sanjiv Khanna		24 June 2005	18 January 2019	13 May 2025	13 years, 208 days	6 years, 116 days	19 years, 324 days	Judge of Delhi HC
15	Shripathi Ravindra Bhat		16 July 2004	23 September 2019	20 October 2023	15 years, 70 days	4 years, 28 days	19 years, 97 days	36th CJ of Rajasthan HC
16	Hima Kohli		29 May 2006	31 August 2021	1 September 2024	15 years, 94 days	3 years, 2 days	18 years, 96 days	3rd CJ of Telangana HC
17	Manmohan		13 March 2008	5 December 2024	Incumbent	16 years, 267 days	1 year, 343 days	18 years, 245 days	33rd CJ of Delhi HC
18	Sanjeev Sachdeva		17 April 2013	2 June 2026	Incumbent	13 years, 46 days	164 days	13 years, 210 days	29th CJ of Madhya Pradesh HC

== District Courts ==
The National Capital Territory of Delhi has 7 District Courts Complex that function under the High Court of Delhi. These 7 are physical locations of the district courts, whereas actually there are 11 district courts headed by individual District Judges. The Tis Hazari complex, Rohini complex and Saket complex hosts 2 Districts each, while the Karkardooma complex hosts 3 Districts and the remaining 3 complexes (Patiala, Dwarka and Rouse Avenue) host 1 District each.

The list of 7 District Courts Complex in Delhi is as follows:

S.No.	Year of establishment	Districts	Name of Court
1	1958	Central Delhi and West Delhi	Tis Hazari Courts Complex
2	1977	New Delhi	Patiala House Courts Complex
3	1993	Jamnapaar (East Delhi, North East Delhi and Shahdara)	Karkardooma Courts Complex
4	2005	North Delhi and North-West Delhi	Rohini Courts Complex
5	2008	South West Delhi	Dwarka Courts Complex
6	2010	South Delhi and South East Delhi	Saket Courts Complex
7	2019	Central Delhi and CBI Courts or labour Court.	Rouse Avenue Courts Complex

== Notable cases ==
Notable cases decided or involving the High Court include:

- Asian News International vs. Wikimedia Foundation
- Naz Foundation v. Govt. of NCT of Delhi
- University of Oxford v. Rameshwari Photocopy Service
- Suresh Kumar Koushal v. Naz Foundation
- Amar Nath Sehgal v. Union of India
- National Legal Services Authority v. Union of India
- Penguin Books Ltd. v. India Book Distributors and Others

== See also ==
- Subordinate courts of Delhi High Court
- 2011 Delhi bombing, at the Delhi High Court
