= Himachal Pradesh High Court =

High Court for the State of Himachal Pradesh

Himachal Pradesh High Court हिमाचल प्रदेश उच्च न्यायालय
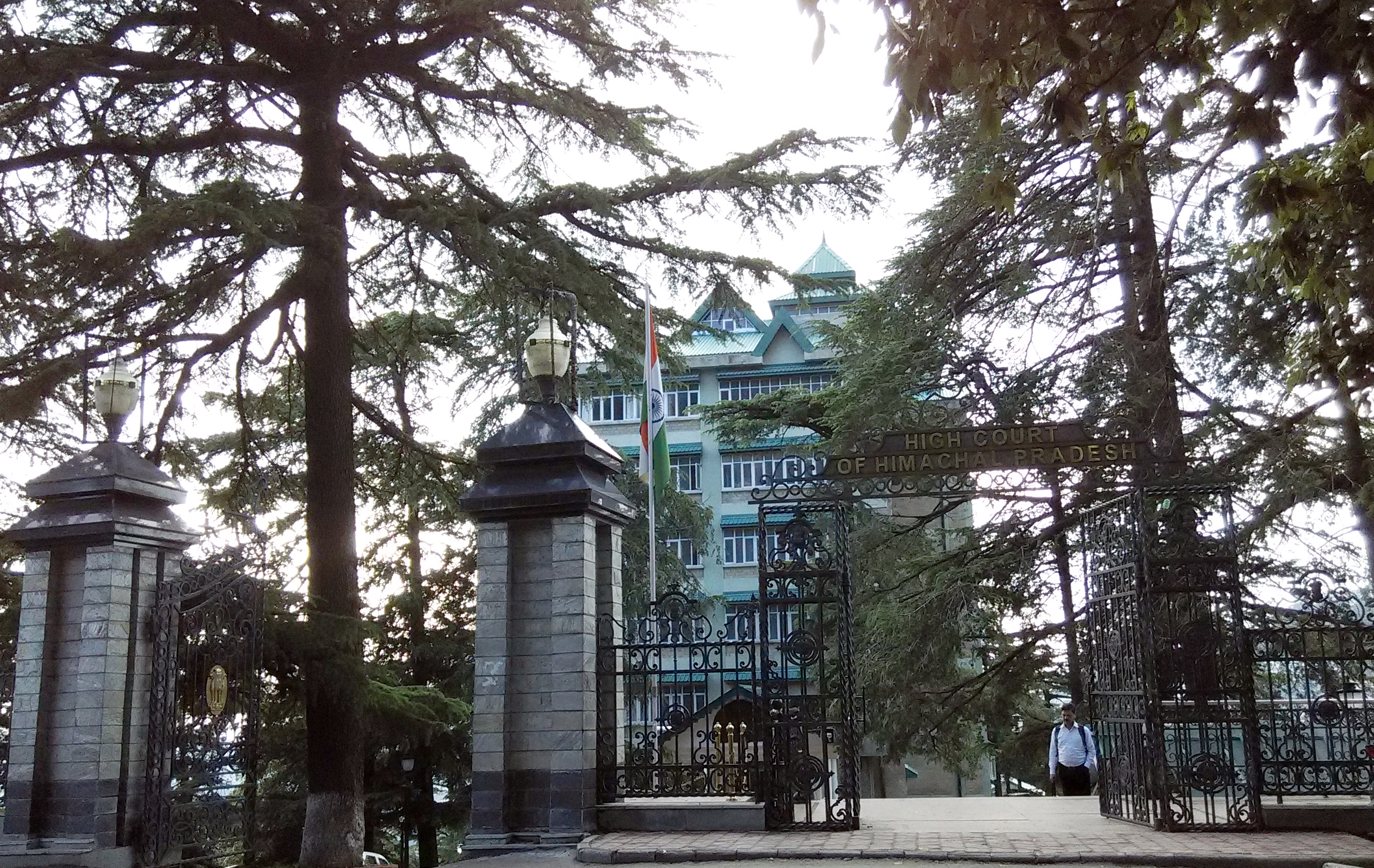
- Entrance Gate of Himachal High Court building
- Interactive map of Himachal Pradesh High Court हिमाचल प्रदेश उच्च न्यायालय
- 31.100°N 77.175°E
- Established: 25 January 1971; 55 years ago
- Jurisdiction: Himachal Pradesh
- Location: Bemloi, Shimla, Himachal Pradesh
- Coordinates: 31.100°N 77.175°E
- Composition method: Presidential with confirmation of Chief Justice of India and Governor of respective state.
- Authorised by: Constitution of India
- Judge term length: Mandatory Retirement by age of 62
- Number of positions: 17
- Website: highcourt.hp.gov.in

Chief Justice
- Currently: Gurmeet Singh Sandhawalia
- Since: 29 December 2024
- Lead position ends: 31 October 2027

The Himachal Pradesh High Court is the High Court of the Indian state of Himachal Pradesh.

Himachal Pradesh was born as a result of integration of twenty six Province and four Punjab hill States into a Centrally Administered Area on 15 April 1948. The Central Government promulgated the Himachal Pradesh (Courts) Order, 1948 on 15 August 1948. As per Paragraph 3 of this Order, the Court of Judicial Commissioner was established for Himachal Pradesh and the Court was housed at "Harvingtan" (Kelston area, Bharari, Shimla). It was vested with the powers of a High Court under the Judicial Commissioner's Court Act, 1950. The Court of Judicial commissioner started functioning on 15 August 1948. The Punjab High Court rules and orders with suitable amendments were made applicable.

In the year 1966, the Delhi High Court Act was enacted by the Government of India and w.e.f. 1 May 1967, the Central Government of India extended jurisdiction of the said Act to the Union Territory of Himachal Pradesh, replacing the Court of Judicial Commissioner by the Himachal Bench of Delhi High Court, at Shimla and it started functioning in old High Court building known as "Revenswood". On 18 December 1970, the State of Himachal Pradesh Act was passed by Parliament and the new state came into being on 25 January 1971 and established its own High Court with headquarters at "Revenswood" Shimla, having one Hon'ble Chief Justice and two Hon'ble Judges.

The seat of the court is Shimla, the administrative capital of the state. The court has a sanctioned judge strength of 13 including the chief justice.

== Chief Justice and Judges ==
Himachal Pradesh High Court is permitted to have a maximum of 17 judges of which 13 may be permanently appointed and 4 may be additionally appointed. Currently, it has 13 judges. On 29 December 2024, Justice Gurmeet Singh Sandhawalia took oath as chief justice of the High Court.

== List of Chief Justices ==
| # | Portrait | Name | From | To |
|---|---|---|---|---|
| 1 | M. H. Beg | Mirza Hameedullah Beg | 25 January 1971 | 9 December 1971 |
| 2 | R. S. Pathak | Raghunandan Swarup Pathak | 18 March 1972 | 19 February 1978 |
| 3 | | Tryambkalal Umedchand Mehta | 20 February 1978 | 11 December 1979 |
| 4 | | Vyas Dev Misra | 12 December 1979 | 30 September 1983 |
| 5 | | Prabodh Dinkarrao Desai | 23 December 1983 | 13 November 1988 |
| 6 | | Narendra Mohan Kasliwal | 29 March 1989 | 5 October 1989 |
| 7 | | Perumbulavil Chakkala Valappil Balakrishna Menon | 6 November 1989 | 14 January 1991 |
| 8 | | Leila Seth | 5 August 1991 | 20 October 1992 |
| 9 | | Shashi Kant Seth | 22 June 1993 | 28 August 1993 |
| 10 | | Viswanathan Ratnam | 29 January 1994 | 1 August 1994 |
| 11 | | Gulab Chand Gupta | 17 September 1994 | 1 March 1995 |
| 12 | | Sailendu Nath Phukan | 1 March 1995 | 1 August 1996 |
| 13 | | Madhavachari Srinivasan | 1 August 1996 | 24 September 1997 |
| 14 | | Makani Narayana Rao | 6 November 1997 | 22 April 1998 |
| 15 | | Doraiswamy Raju | 1 July 1998 | 28 January 2000 |
| 16 | | Chunilal Karsandas Thakker | 5 May 2000 | 30 December 2001 |
| 17 | | Wungazan Awungshi Shishak | 24 January 2002 | 1 January 2003 |
| 18 | | Vinod Kumar Gupta | 8 March 2003 | 2 February 2008 |
| 19 | | Jagadish Bhalla | 2 February 2008 | 7 August 2009 |
| 20 | | Kurian Joseph | 8 February 2010 | 6 March 2013 |
| 21 | | Ajay Manikrao Khanwilkar | 5 April 2013 | 24 November 2013 |
| 22 | | Mansoor Ahmad Mir | 18 June 2014 | 24 April 2017 |
| 23 | | Surya Kant | 5 October 2018 | 23 May 2019 |
| 24 | | V. Ramasubramanian | 22 June 2019 | 22 September 2019 |
| 25 | | Lingappa Narayana Swamy | 6 October 2019 | 30 June 2021 |
| 26 | | Mohammad Rafiq | 14 October 2021 | 24 May 2022 |
| 27 | | Amjad Ahtesham Sayed | 23 June 2022 | 20 January 2023 |
| 28 | | Mamidanna Satyratna Ramachandra Rao | 30 May 2023 | 24 September 2024 |
| 29 | | Rajiv Shakdher | 25 September 2024 | 18 October 2024 |
| 30 | | Gurmeet Singh Sandhawalia | 29 December 2024 | Incumbent |

== Judges elevated as Chief Justices ==
This sections contains list of only those judges elevated as chief justices whose parent high court is Himachal Pradesh. This includes those judges who, at the time of appointment as chief justice, may not be serving in Himachal Pradesh High Court but this list does not include judges who at the time of appointment as chief justice were serving in Himachal Pradesh High Court but does not have Himachal Pradesh as their Parent High Court.

Colour Key

- Female Chief Justice
- Served as Chief Justice of India

Symbol Key

- ^{‡} Elevated to Supreme Court of India
- ^{RES} Resigned
- ^{†} Died in office

| Name | Image | Appointed as CJ in HC of | Date of appointment | | Date of retirement (Note: this includes date of resignation, death and elevation to supreme court) | Tenure | |
| Name | Image | Appointed as CJ in HC of | As Judge | As Chief Justice | Date of retirement | As Chief Justice | As Judge (Note: also includes tenure as Chief Justice) |
|---|---|---|---|---|---|---|---|
| Bhawani Singh | | Jammu & Kashmir, transferred to Madhya Pradesh then to Gujarat | 16 December 1988 | 16 June 1997 | 28 March 2006 | 8 years, 286 days | 17 years, 103 days |
| Devinder Gupta | | Andhra Pradesh | 25 June 1990 | 10 March 2003 | 4 April 2005 | 2 years, 26 days | 14 years, 284 days |
| Deepak Gupta | | Tripura, transferred to Chhattisgarh | 4 October 2004 | 23 March 2013 | 16 February 2017^{[‡]} | 3 years, 331 days | 12 years, 136 days |
| Abhilasha Kumari | | Manipur | 2 December 2005 | 9 February 2018 | 23 February 2018 | 15 days | 12 years, 84 days |
| Sanjay Karol | | Tripura, transferred to Patna | 8 March 2007 | 14 November 2018 | 5 February 2023^{[‡]} | 4 years, 84 days | 15 years, 335 days |
| Tarlok Singh Chauhan | | Jharkhand | 23 February 2014 | 23 July 2025 | 8 January 2026 | 170 days | 11 years, 320 days |

=== Judges appointed as Acting Chief Justice ===
| Name | Appointed as ACJ in HC of | Date of appointment as Judge | Period as Acting Chief Justice | Date of retirement | Tenure as ACJ | Tenure as Judge | Remarks | Ref.. |
|---|---|---|---|---|---|---|---|---|
| Dhruva Bihari Lal | Himachal Pradesh | 11 March 1971 | 10 Dec 1971 – 17 Mar 1972 | 3 April 1979 | 99 days | 8 years, 24 days | -- | |
| Hira Singh Thakur | Himachal Pradesh | 5 January 1979 | 1 Oct 1983 – 22 Dec 1983 | 10 August 1986 | 83 days | 7 years, 218 days | -- | |
| Bhawani Singh | Himachal Pradesh | 16 December 1988 | 20 Oct 1992 – 21 Jun 1993 | 28 March 2006 | 245 days | 17 years, 103 days | -- | |
| Bhawani Singh | Himachal Pradesh | 16 December 1988 | 28 Aug 1993 – 28 Jan 1994 | 28 March 2006 | 154 days | 17 years, 103 days | -- | |
| Bhawani Singh | Himachal Pradesh | 16 December 1988 | 1 Aug 1994 – 16 Sep 1994 | 28 March 2006 | 47 days | 17 years, 103 days | -- | |
| Devinder Gupta | Delhi | 25 June 1990 | 3 Feb 1999 – 24 May 1999 | 4 April 2005 | 111 days | 14 years, 284 days | -- | |
| Devinder Gupta | Delhi | 25 June 1990 | 15 Mar 2000 – 9 May 2000 | 4 April 2005 | 56 days | 14 years, 284 days | -- | |
| Devinder Gupta | Delhi | 25 June 1990 | 19 Oct 2001 – 25 Nov 2001 | 4 April 2005 | 38 days | 14 years, 284 days | -- | |
| Devinder Gupta | Delhi | 25 June 1990 | 2 Oct 2002 – 4 Mar 2003 | 4 April 2005 | 154 days | 14 years, 284 days | Elevated as CJ of undivided Andhra Pradesh | |
| Kamlesh Sharma | Himachal Pradesh | 25 June 1990 | 2 Aug 1996 – 11 Aug 1996 | 30 August 2003 | 10 days | 13 years, 67 days | -- | |
| Kamlesh Sharma | Himachal Pradesh | 25 June 1990 | 25 Sep 1997 – 6 Nov 1997 | 30 August 2003 | 43 days | 13 years, 67 days | -- | |
| Kamlesh Sharma | Himachal Pradesh | 25 June 1990 | 22 Apr 1998 – 30 Jun 1998 | 30 August 2003 | 70 days | 13 years, 67 days | -- | |
| Kamlesh Sharma | Himachal Pradesh | 25 June 1990 | 29 Jan 2000 – 4 May 2000 | 30 August 2003 | 97 days | 13 years, 67 days | -- | |
| Kamlesh Sharma | Himachal Pradesh | 25 June 1990 | 31 Dec 2001 – 24 Jan 2002 | 30 August 2003 | 25 days | 13 years, 67 days | -- | |
| Kamlesh Sharma | Himachal Pradesh | 25 June 1990 | 1 Jan 2003 – 7 Mar 2003 | 30 August 2003 | 66 days | 13 years, 67 days | -- | |
| Dev Darshan Sud | Himachal Pradesh | 27 November 2006 | 24 Nov 2013 – 26 Nov 2013 | 18 February 2014 | 3 days | 7 years, 84 days | | |
| Sanjay Karol | Himachal Pradesh | 8 March 2007 | 25 Apr 2017 – 5 Oct 2018 | 5 February 2023^{[‡]} | 1 year, 164 days | 15 years, 335 days | -- | |
| Rajeev Sharma | Uttarakhand | 3 April 2007 | 7 Aug 2018 – 2 Nov 2018 | 7 October 2020 | 87 days | 13 years, 188 days | Transferred to Punjab & Haryana | |
| Rajeev Sharma | Punjab & Haryana | 3 April 2007 | 23 Sep 2019 – 5 Oct 2019 | 7 October 2020 | 13 days | 13 years, 188 days | -- | |
| Dharam Chand Chaudhary | Himachal Pradesh | 21 January 2012 | 24 May 2019 – 21 Jun 2019 | 12 March 2020 | 29 days | 8 years, 52 days | -- | |
| Dharam Chand Chaudhary | Himachal Pradesh | 21 January 2012 | 23 Sep 2019 – 5 Oct 2019 | 12 March 2020 | 13 days | 8 years, 52 days | -- | |
| T. S. Chauhan | Himachal Pradesh | 23 February 2014 | 20 Apr 2023 – 29 May 2023 | 8 January 2026 | 40 days | 11 years, 320 days | -- | |
| T. S. Chauhan | Himachal Pradesh | 23 February 2014 | 19 Oct 2024 – 28 Dec 2024 | 8 January 2026 | 71 days | 11 years, 320 days | -- | |

== Judges elevated to Supreme Court ==
This section includes the list of only those judges whose parent high court was Himachal Pradesh. This includes those judges who, at the time of elevation to Supreme Court of India, may not be serving in Himachal Pradesh High Court but this list does not include judges who at the time of elevation were serving in Himachal Pradesh High Court but does not have Himachal Pradesh as their Parent High Court.

Colour Key

- Female Judge
- Served as Chief Justice of India

Key

- ^{RES} Resigned
- ^{†} Died in office

| # | Name of the Judge | Image | Date of Appointment | | Date of Retirement | Tenure | | | Immediately preceding office |
| # | Name of the Judge | Image | In Parent High Court | In Supreme Court | Date of Retirement | In High Court(s) | In Supreme Court | Total tenure (Note: Includes both tenure as High Court Judge as well as Supreme Court Judge) | Immediately preceding office |
|---|---|---|---|---|---|---|---|---|---|
| 1 | Lokeshwar Singh Panta | | 20 August 1991 | 3 February 2006 | 23 September 2009 | 14 years, 167 days | 3 years, 233 days | 18 years, 35 days | Judge of Himachal Pradesh HC |
| 2 | Deepak Gupta | | 4 October 2004 | 17 February 2017 | 6 May 2020 | 12 years, 136 days | 3 years, 80 days | 15 years, 216 days | 10th CJ of Chhattisgarh HC |
| 3 | Sanjay Karol | | 8 March 2007 | 6 February 2023 | 22 August 2026 | 15 years, 335 days | 3 years, 198 days | 19 years, 168 days | 43rd CJ of Patna HC |

== See also ==
- High courts of India
- List of chief justices of the Himachal Pradesh High Court
