= National Green Tribunal Act, 2010 =

Act of the Parliament of India

Parliament of India
- Long title: An Act to provide for the establishment of a National Green Tribunal for the effective and expeditious disposal of cases relating to environmental protection and conservation of forests and other natural resources including enforcement of any legal right relating to environment and giving relief and compensation for damages to persons and property and for matters connected therewith or incidental thereto.
- Citation: Act No. 19 of 2010
- Passed by: Lok Sabha
- Passed: 30 April 2010
- Passed by: Rajya Sabha
- Passed: 5 May 2010
- Assented to by: President Pratibha Patil
- Assented to: 18 October 2010

Legislative history

Initiating chamber: Lok Sabha
- Bill title: National Green Tribunal Bill, 2009
- Bill citation: Bill No. 63 of 2009
- Introduced by: Jairam Ramesh, MoS for Environment and Forests
- Introduced: 31 July 2009
- Passed: 30 April 2010
- Committee report: 24 November 2009

Revising chamber: Rajya Sabha
- Passed: 5 May 2010

Repeals
- National Environment Tribunal Act, 1995 (27 of 1995)
- Status: In force

The National Green Tribunal Act, 2010 is an Act of the Parliament of India which enables the creation of a special tribunal for the expeditious disposal of the cases pertaining to environmental issues. It draws inspiration from Article 21 of India's constitution, on the protection of life and personal liberty, which assures the citizens of India the right to a healthy environment. This Act serves as the basis for the establishment of the National Green Tribunal (NGT).

== Definition ==
The Act of Parliament defines the National Green Tribunal Act, 2010 as follows:

An Act to provide for the establishment of a National Green Tribunal for the effective and expeditious disposal of cases relating to environmental protection and conservation of forests and other natural resources including enforcement of any legal right relating to environment and giving relief and compensation for damages to persons and property and for matters connected therewith or incidental thereto.

The Tribunal's dedicated jurisdiction in environmental matters shall provide speedy environmental justice and help reduce the burden of litigation in the higher courts. The Tribunal shall not be bound by the procedure laid down under the Code of Civil Procedure, 1908, but shall be guided by principles of natural justice. The tribunal is mandated to make and endeavour for disposal of applications or appeals finally within 6 months of the filing of the same. Initially, the NGT is proposed to be set up at five places of sittings and will follow circuit procedure for making itself more accessible; New Delhi is the Principal Place of Sitting of the Tribunal and Bhopal, Pune, Kolkata and Chennai shall be the other place of sitting of the Tribunal.

== Origin ==
During the summit of United Nations Conference on Environment and Development in June 1992, India vowed the participating states to provide judicial and administrative remedies to the victims of the pollutants and other environmental damage.

There lie many reasons behind the setting up of this tribunal. After India's move with carbon credits, such tribunal may play a vital role in ensuring the control of emissions and maintaining the desired levels. This is the first body of its kind that is required by its parent statute to apply the polluter pays principle and the principle of sustainable development.

India is the third country following Australia and New Zealand to have such a system. Delhi Pollution Control Committee (DPCC) works under the act of (NGT).

== Structure ==
The five regional benches are at New Delhi (North), Mumbai (West), Bhopal (Central), Chennai (South) and Kolkata (East). Each Bench has a specified geographical jurisdiction in a region. Further, a mechanism for circuit benches is also available. For example, the Southern Zone bench, which is based in Chennai, can decide to have sittings in other places like Bangalore or Hyderabad.

The Chairperson of the NGT is a retired Judge of the Supreme Court, headquartered in New Delhi. On 18 October 2010, Justice Lokeshwar Singh Panta became its first Chairman and currently Justice Prakash Shrivastava has been appointed as Chairperson of National Green Tribunal (NGT) on 21 August 2023. Retired justice Adarsh Kumar Goel is the former chairman of the tribunal from 6 July 2018 to 6 July 2023. Also, on 15 January 2022, Afroz Ahmad took charge as a Member at the Principal bench Delhi. Other Judicial members are retired judges of High Courts. Each bench of the NGT will comprise at least one Judicial Member and one Expert Member. Expert members should have a professional qualification and a minimum of 15 years of experience in the field of environment/forest conservation and related subjects. The members are not re-elected.

== Former chairpersons ==
Following is the list of the former NGT chairpersons

Sr No	Name	From	To
1	Lokeshwar Singh Panta	18 October 2010	31 December 2011
2	Swatanter Kumar	20 December 2012	19 December 2017
3	Adarsh Kumar Goel	6 July 2018	6 July 2023
4	Prakash Shrivastava	2023	

== See also ==
- Central Pollution Control Board
- Environmental issues in India
