= Aradhana Seth =

Indian art director

- Occupations: Art director, production designers, filmmaker
- Years active: 1995-present
- Relatives: Vikram Seth (brother); Leila Seth (mother)

Aradhana Seth is an Indian art director, artist, production designer and filmmaker who has worked in the Hindi film industry as well as for Hollywood productions like Wes Anderson's The Darjeeling Limited, London Has Fallen and The Bourne Supremacy. As an artist, Seth has exhibited her works at Chemould Prescott Road Gallery, Grosvenor Gallery, KHOJ New Delhi. Seth also produced the 2020 BBC adaptation of her brother, Vikram Seth's novel A Suitable Boy. She is based in Goa, India.

== Biography ==
Seth's mother was the Indian Chief Justice Leila Seth, and her brothers are the novelist Vikram Seth and the Buddhist teacher Shantum Seth.

Seth graduated with a master’s degree from the Mass Communications Research Centre at the Jamia Millia Islamia University in New Delhi. Following graduation she first worked as an assistant director for the film In Which Annie Gives it Those Ones written by Arundhati Roy. She also worked as the designer for the film. In 1992, she met the director Deepa Mehta on the set of The Young Indiana Jones Chronicles which led her to design the sets for Mehta's films Fire in 1996 and Earth in 1998.

== Selected filmography ==
Seth has been involved in art direction or production design for:

- The Bourne Supremacy (2004) - art department (India unit)
- Don: The Chase Begins Again (2006) - production designer
- The Darjeeling Limited (2007) - art director
- London Has Fallen (2016) - art director
- The Sky Is Pink (2018) - production design
