= Penguin Books Ltd. v. India Book Distributors and Others =

Decision of the Delhi High Court (1984)

Penguin Books Ltd. v. India Book Distributors and Others, was a 1984 Delhi High Court court case. Penguin Books Ltd. of England brought a suit for perpetual injunction against the respondents, India Book Distributors of New Delhi, to restrain them from infringing Penguin's territorial license in 23 books, the subject matter of the suit.

== Facts ==
A consent decree had been obtained in the United States stating that there shall be no restriction in regard to a book that is lawfully published for sale, import, export, distribution, or resale. Penguin Books Ltd. (PBL) holds territorial copyright license in some books under the Indian Copyright Act, 1957. The respondents, India Book Distributors, were distributing, importing or offering for sale 13 of 23 titles as American editions. A suit for personal injunction was brought against them restraining them from infringing on PBL's territorial license in the subject matter of the suit. The relief of temporary injunction was declined by a single judge on the ground of the US Court’s consent decree.

Clauses V and VI of the consent decree provide as follows:

V. Each defendant is enjoined and restrained, directly or indirectly, from preventing or restricting any purchaser of a lawfully published book from importing or exporting such book to or from the United States. Or such purchaser from selling, distributing or providing for the resale of such Book to customers in United States interstate or foreign commerce."

VI. "Nothing in this Final Judgment shall prevent any defendant, in and of itself, from acquiring, granting or otherwise transferring exclusive or non-exclusive copyright rights, or from exercising or authorizing the exercise of such rights under the copyright law of any country, including the United States, or from the assertion of such other statutory rights as such defendant may have, provided that no foreign copyright law or other foreign statutory right may be used by any defendant to exclude or restrict the importation or resale in the United States of a lawfully published Book.”

== Issues discussed ==
1. Contended that the consent decree is not a bar to asserting rights under the Copyright Act, 1956.
2. It was contended by the plaintiff that the importation of American Editions for the purpose of resale is an infringement of copyright.
3. Whether temporary injunction can be granted?

== The Court’s ruling ==
Several contentions were raised.

1. Contended that the consent decree is not a bar to asserting rights under the Copyright Act, 1956. It was prima facie evident that PBL had the license to the books in question. The Whitford Committee also observed that there is a practice of challenging the title is more often than not an abuse of process. The court held that the consent decree has no extraterritorial application. The United States of America, being a foreign state, is an independent sovereign government which exercises sovereign authority over its own territory and in accordance with international law has no right to exercise sovereign authority beyond its own territory. The courts of India cannot recognize the writ of a District Court of the United States notwithstanding the principle of comity of nations. This is made abundantly clear from Clause VI which acts as a saving clause. The effect of the clause is that Clause V will not affect the statutory rights that belong to publishers under foreign regional arrangements.

It was also held by the Court that copyright law is territorial in nature and while US might disallow restrictions on the resale of books, the laws of US may not abrogate the effects of laws in the place where those books have been imported. Thus, the importer will be forced to comply with the laws of the country to which he imports, and he cannot defeat the rights of the exclusive license holder.

2. It was contended by the plaintiff that the importation of American Editions for the purpose of resale is an infringement of copyright.

Importation:

The court held that ‘Importation is forbidden unless a license has been given.’ The court said that the above idea needs to be respected as if it is not, then the purpose of granting exclusive licenses would be defeated, as would the idea of the national division of copyright which has been provided for in the International Copyright Convention.

The argument by the defendant was that importation of lawfully published books is not an infringement of copyright under the Act. The court was dismissed this argument by saying that the owner of copyright has been defined to include an exclusive license. Exclusive license in turn has been defined as a license having ‘any right comprised in the copyright’ in a work to the exclusion of all others including the owner of the copyright. The license may be limited in scope, time and territory.

Copyright has been defined to include the exclusive right, among others, to reproduce the work in any form and to publish the work. Furthermore, S. 51 of the Act deals with infringement. It says that copyright in a work will be infringed when an infringing copy of the work has been imported. Infringing copy of work has been defined as any work which has been imported in contravention to the provisions of the Act. The mainstay of S.51 is that a copyright is deemed to be infringed when any person does something which the Act confers as an exclusive right to the owner of the copyright.

The court holds in the judgment that the test of whether an imported work infringes copyright is laid down in S.53 (this section allows seizure of goods by the Registrar of Copyrights). The test is that whether the copy if made in India would infringe copyright? If so, then it infringes upon copyright. This is because the essence of infringement is taking what is not yours. Copyright is a territorial right and has been regarded as something worth protecting in the ultimate public interest.

The court held that the import has infringed upon the copyright of PBL because if they are made here, they would offend the copyright of PBL.

Publication

The court also held that the work has been published in India. To do this, the court said that for literary works publication is ‘the issue of copies of the work, either in whole or in part, to the public in a manner sufficient to satisfy the reasonable requirements of the public having regard to the nature of the work.’ The court held that the India Distributors is not guilty of primary infringement but is guilty of secondary infringement when it allows public distribution of titles.

3. Whether temporary injunction can be granted?

The last question is whether a temporary injunction can be granted. The court said that temporary injunctions are granted in cases where damages are an inadequate remedy. The test for this was laid down in American Cyanamid Co v Ethicon Ltd. The following questions must be asked:

1. Is there a serious issue to be tried? If there is not no injunction will be issued. If yes, then the next question is looked into by the court.
2. Can the plaintiff adequately be compensated with damages? If no, the court must see if the defendant can adequately be compensated with the plaintiffs undertaking to pay at trial, then an injunction shall be ordered.
3. If there is no clear answer, then the court shall look into who shall suffer greater inconvenience if the injunction is granted or not. This is called the balance of convenience test.
4. If the balance of convenience test fails, then the relative strength of each side’s case should be evaluated by looking at the affidavit evidence.

Injunctions in such cases will usually be granted, as most infringements constitute continuing offences and won’t be granted if the damage to the plaintiff would be out of proportion with the infringement.

== Significance ==
This decision was useful in clarifying the law in India with regard to parallel importation. There was a change in law after the judgment where Section 14 of the Act was amended from "publication" to "issue of copies of the work to the public not being copies already in circulation."

In light of this amendment which when read with S. 40, which says that all provisions of this will apply to works first published in any territory as if it was first published in India, would mean that all books published abroad would be akin to books published in India. So, the same limitations should apply, including the doctrine of first sale. This has been the position taken by various commentators. The Court, however, in the recent Eurokids decision seemed not to have taken notice of the change in law and followed the reasoning given in the Penguin judgment.

The decision has also been criticized as it does not deal with the issue of privity of contract i.e. how are the terms of the license (namely the territorial limitation) being imposed on a third party who has no knowledge of the license, and neither is a party to the license?

== Comparative analysis of other jurisdictions ==
=== United States ===
The US believes in the doctrine of first sale which enables the resident of the US to resell legally obtained items without the copyright owner's permission. In Kirstaeng v. John Wiley & Sons Inc, The US Supreme Court held that the protections and exceptions offered under the copyright act are applicable anywhere and not copies made just in the US. So, the first sale doctrine is applicable anywhere and parallel imports are allowed.

=== Europe ===
Europe follows an idea of regional exhaustion where the first sale doctrine applies within the European Economic Area (EEA). This is because the idea of free trade of goods is placed on a very high pedestal. However, for goods originating outside the EEA, the countries are free to enact law which stops parallel importation using copyright law.
