= Lokeshwar Singh Panta =

Indian judge (born 1944)

Lokayukta, Himachal Pradesh
- Incumbent
- Assumed office 3 February 2012

Chairperson of the National Green Tribunal
- In office 18 October 2010 – 31 December 2011

Judge of the Supreme Court of India
- In office 3 February 2006 – 23 April 2009

Judge of the Himachal Pradesh High Court
- In office 20 August 1991 – 3 February 2006

Deputy Advocate General
- In office 1980–1989

Personal details
- Born: 23 April 1944 (age 82) Tehsil Jubbal, District Shimla
- Education: Faculty of Law, University of Delhi
- Website: Lokayukta

Lokeshwar Singh Panta (born 23 April 1944 in Tehsil Jubbal) is an Indian jurist and former judge. He served as a judge of the Supreme Court of India and was the first chairperson of the National Green Tribunal. Currently, he holds the position of Lokayukta in the state of Himachal Pradesh.

== Education ==
Panta completed his primary education and graduated before obtaining a degree in Law from the Faculty of Law, University of Delhi in 1970.

== Career ==
Panta began his legal career on 22 July 1970 as an Advocate, specializing in service matters, constitutional law, administrative law, civil and labor law, criminal law, and taxation in the High Court of Himachal Pradesh. As an advocate, he held several key positions within the legal community, including secretary of the High Court Bar Association from 1976 to 1977, vice-president from 1986 to 1987 and from 15 May 1988 to 16 December 1988, and president from 17 December 1988 to 21 July 1989.

On 28 February 1980, Panta was appointed as the deputy advocate general of Himachal Pradesh. In this capacity, he represented the state before the Central Administrative Tribunal and Himachal Pradesh State Administrative Tribunal. From December 1988 to March 1989, he also assumed the duties and functions of the advocate general. Panta further represented the Himachal Pradesh Legislative Assembly before the Lokayukta and served as a vigilance officer in the Department of the Advocate General of Himachal Pradesh. He is a life member of the Executive Committee of the Indian Law Institute and a member of the Executive Council for the All India Law Institute (State Unit).

Panta was appointed as an additional judge of the High Court of Himachal Pradesh on 20 August 1991, and he became a permanent judge on 28 July 1995. As a judge, he served as the executive chairman of the Himachal Pradesh State Legal Services Authority from 26 December 1995. In February 2006, Panta was elevated to the Supreme Court of India, where he served as a judge until 23 April 2009.

Following his retirement, on the recommendation of the Chief Justice, Panta was appointed as the first Chairperson of the newly established National Green Tribunal on 18 October 2010. He served in this position for a term of five years until 31 December 2011. Since 3 February 2012, Panta has been serving as the Lokayukta of Himachal Pradesh.
