= Dharam Chand Chaudhary =

Former Judge of Himachal Pradesh High Court

Hon'ble Retd. Justice Dharam Chand Chaudhary

Judge of Himachal Pradesh High Court
- In office 21 January 2012 – 11 March 2020
- Nominated by: S. H. Kapadia
- Appointed by: Pratibha Patil

Personal details
- Born: 12 March 1958 (age 68) Himachal Pradesh

Justice Dharam Chand Chaudhary (born 12 March 1958) is an Indian judge. He is former Judge of Himachal Pradesh High Court and also former Acting Chief Justice of Himachal Pradesh High Court.
