= Dwarka Courts Complex =

District Court

Coordinates: 28.5808°N 77.0595°E

Dwarka District Court (South West Delhi) is one of the seven District Courts in the National Capital Territory of Delhi that function under the Delhi High Court. The Dwarka District Courts Complex is situated at Sector- 10, Dwarka, New Delhi Near by Dwarka Sector 10 Metro Station.

== Information ==
The Dwarka District Courts Complex was inaugurated by the Hon’ble Chief Justice of India, Sh. K.G. Balakrishanan in the year of the 2008 on 6 September. Its functioning started since 08.09.2008 with its first district judge Sh.Inder Singh Mehta (I.S. Mehta). Apart from various Civil, Criminal, Motor accident and family Courts the functioning of 8 evening court is also operational. The Dwarka District Courts Complex includes two seven storied court room blocks building and one admin block building which are interconnected it also includes one 8 storied lawyers chamber block building.
