= Mansoor Ahmad Mir =

Indian judge

Mansoor Ahmad Mir is an Indian judge and a former Chief Justice of Himachal Pradesh High Court.

== Career ==
Mir was born on 25 April 1955, at Rajpora village of Pulwama district in Jammu and Kashmir. He obtained a bachelor's degree (BA) from Amar Singh College in 1976 and LL.B in 1978 from Kashmir University. After practicing law for 14 years, he appeared for Jammu and Kashmir Judicial Services Examination and secured the first position in 1992. Mir was appointed as an additional judge of the Jammu and Kashmir High Court on 31 January 2005 and confirmed as its permanent judge on 7 July 2007. He was transferred to the High Court of Himachal Pradesh and took over as Acting Chief Justice on 26 November 2013, and remained in the post up to 18 June 2014, when he was appointed Chief Justice of Himachal Pradesh.
