= C. K. Thakker =

Indian judge (born 1943)

Chief Justice of the Himachal Pradesh High Court
- In office 5 May 2000 – 30 December 2001

Chief Justice of Bombay High Court
- In office 31 December 2001 – 2004

Judge of the Supreme Court of India
- In office 7 June 2004 – 10 November 2008

Personal details
- Born: Chunilal Karsandas Thakker; 10 November 1943 (age 83) Mander (Porbandar district, Gujarat)
- Education: Gujarat University

Chunilal Karsandas Thakker (also Thakkar) (born 10 November 1943) is a retired judge of the Supreme Court of India.

== Biography ==
Thakker was born 10 November 1943, Mander near Porbandar, Gujarat, India. After taking primary education at Mander and Madhavpur, Thakker graduated from a college in Junagadh and obtained a Bachelor of Laws from a law college in Jamnagar. He also obtained a Master of Laws from Gujarat University, and began practicing from 1968 in the Gujarat High Court.

He was appointed part-time lecturer in law in L.A. Shah Law College, Ahmedabad, in 1970 and continued as such until he was elevated as a judge of the Gujarat High Court on 21 June 1990. He was promoted to Chief Justice of the Himachal Pradesh High Court, Shimla on 5 May 2000 and transferred as the Chief Justice of High Court of Judicature at Mumbai on 31 December 2001.

Thakker was appointed a judge of the Supreme Court of India on 7 June 2004. He was also acting governor of the State of Maharashtra from July to October 2002.

== Publications ==
Thakkar has written several law books such as Lectures on Administrative Law (Students' Edition) and Code of Civil Procedure. His book on the Code of Civil Procedure, 1908 published under the pen name of C.K. Takwani has remained a standard textbook for law students in India for the past 25 years. He revised Law of Writs by V.G. Ramachandran.
