= Narendra Mohan Kasliwal =

Indian judge (1928–2021)

Hon'ble Justice (Retd.) Narendra Mohan Kasliwal

Judge of Supreme Court of India
- In office 6 October 1989 – 3 April 1993
- Nominated by: E. S. Venkataramiah
- Appointed by: R. Venkataraman

6th Chief Justice of Himachal Pradesh High Court
- In office 29 March 1989 – 5 October 1989
- Nominated by: R. S. Pathak
- Appointed by: R. Venkataraman
- Preceded by: P. D. Desai; Vijaya Kumar Mehrotra (acting)
- Succeeded by: P. C. Balakrishna Menon; Vijaya Kumar Mehrotra (acting)

Judge of Rajasthan High Court
- In office 15 June 1978 – 28 March 1989
- Nominated by: Y. V. Chandrachud
- Appointed by: Neelam Sanjiva Reddy

Personal details
- Born: 4 April 1928 Jaipur, Rajasthan
- Died: 10 January 2021 (aged 92)
- Education: B.Sc and LL.B

Narendra Mohan Kasliwal (4 April 1928 – 10 January 2021) was a judge of the Supreme Court of India.

== Career ==
Kasliwal passed B.Sc., Bachelor of Laws. and enrolled as an Advocate in 16 August 1954. He practised on civil and constitutional matters in Rajasthan High Court. He also worked as part time lecturer in Jodhpur Law College, Jodhpur from 1960 to 1972. Kasliwal was first elevated as additional judge of the Rajasthan High Court on 15 June 1978. On 29 March 1989 he was transferred to the Himachal Pradesh High Court as the chief justice. He was appointed additional judge of the Supreme Court of India on 6 October 1989. Kasliwal retired in April 1993 from the judgeship. After the retirement he was appointed by the Supreme Court to oversee the election of Rajasthan Cricket Association as a principal observer in 2013.
