= Leila Seth =

Former Himachal Pradesh High Court Chief Justice

Hon'ble Chief Justice Leila Seth
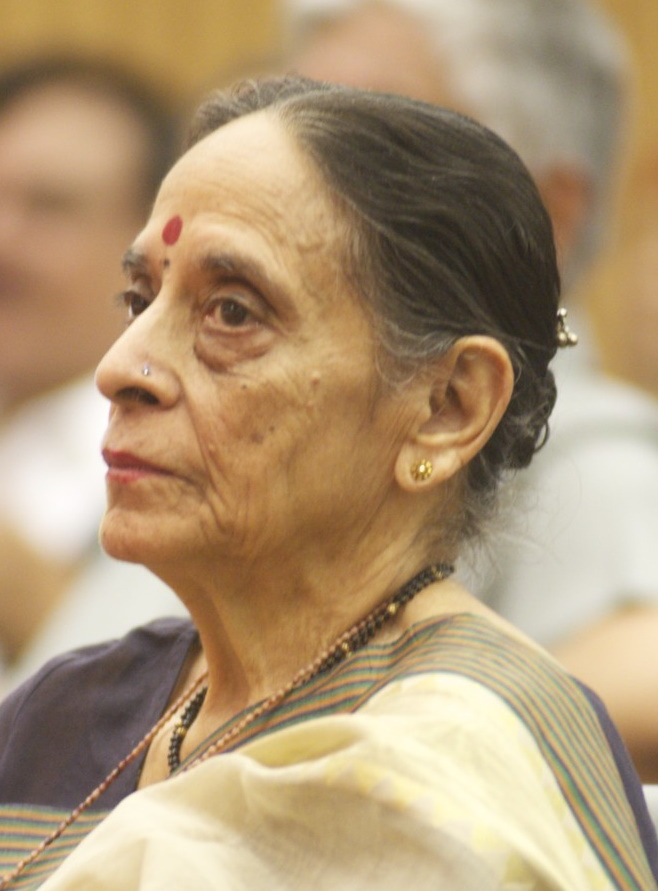
- Seth in 2011

8th Chief Justice of Himachal Pradesh High Court
- In office 5 August 1991 – 19 October 1992
- Nominated by: Ranganath Misra
- Appointed by: Shankar Dayal Sharma
- Preceded by: P. C. B. Menon; V. K. Mehrotra (acting)
- Succeeded by: Shashi Kant Seth; Bhawani Singh (acting)

Judge of Delhi High Court
- In office 25 July 1978 – 4 August 1991
- Nominated by: Y. V. Chandrachud
- Appointed by: Neelam Sanjiva Reddy
- Acting Chief Justice
- In office 22 July 1991 – 4 August 1991
- Appointed by: R. Venkataraman
- Preceded by: Milap Chand Jain
- Succeeded by: Gokal Chand Mittal
- In office 28 September 1990 – 27 November 1990
- Appointed by: R. Venkataraman
- Preceded by: Rabindranath Pyne
- Succeeded by: Milap Chand Jain

Personal details
- Born: 20 October 1930 Lucknow, United Provinces, British India (now Uttar Pradesh, India)
- Died: 5 May 2017 (aged 86) Noida, Uttar Pradesh, India
- Spouse: Prem Nath Seth
- Children: 3; including Vikram Seth and Aradhana Seth
- Education: Loreto Convent, Darjeeling
- Occupation: Judge

Leila Seth (20 October 1930 – 5 May 2017) was an Indian judge who served as the first woman judge in Delhi High Court and the first woman to become Chief Justice of a state High Court, Himachal Pradesh High Court, on 5 August 1991. She was also the first woman to be designated as a senior counsel by the Supreme Court of India. She sat on a number of enquiry commissions, including one into the death of 'Biscuit Baron' Rajan Pillai, and was also a part of the three-member bench of the Justice Verma Committee that was established to overhaul India's rape laws in the aftermath of the infamous 2012 Delhi gang-rape case. She was a member of the 15th Law Commission of India from 1997 to 2000, and was responsible for the amendments to the Hindu Succession Act that gave equal rights to daughters in joint family property.

== Early life ==
Leila Seth was born on 20 October 1930 in Lucknow, the first daughter after two sons in her family. She is said to have been very close to her father, who worked in the Imperial Railway Service and was devastated when he died when she was only 11 years old.

After her father's death, the family struggled financially, but Leila's mother managed to educate her in Loreto Convent, Darjeeling. After finishing her schooling, she began to work as a stenographer in Kolkata. It was here that she was introduced to her husband Prem Seth, and had what she called a 'semi-arranged' marriage.

After marriage, she moved to London with her husband who was working at Bata. Her move to London gave her the opportunity to start studying law. In an interview, she said that she picked law for the simple reason that it did not require attending classes, which was a priority since she had an infant at the time.

In 1958, Leila Seth wrote the London Bar exam and topped it at the age of 27, becoming the first woman to do so. She joined the bar in 1959. In the same year she also cleared the civil services examination as an IAS officer. Upon topping the Bar in England, Seth was referred to as "Mother-in-Law" by a London newspaper, which carried a photograph of a young Leila Seth with her infant son, born only a few months before the exams. At the same time, other newspapers expressed their grief about how out of 580 students who took the Bar Exam, a married woman topped it.

== Career ==
Immediately after the London Bar, Leila and Prem Seth moved back to India, where Leila began to practice law in Patna. She initially worked under a senior lawyer named Sachin Chaudhary. She also worked as a junior to Ashoke Kumar Sen. She worked at the Patna High Court for 10 years. She has spoken about the discriminatory attitudes she had to face for being a woman in the male-dominated field of law. She recounted how she would initially not get a lot of work, as people did not think a woman lawyer would be capable of handling it.

Leila Seth handled diverse cases, from Tax matters (Income Tax, Sales Tax, Excise and Customs), to Company Law, Constitutional Law, Civil, Criminal cases and also Matrimonial suits and public interest litigations. After practicing at the Patna High Court for 10 years, Leila Seth moved to the Delhi High Court in 1972 and worked with original civil petitions, criminal matters, company petitions, revisions and appeals. In the same year, she launched her Supreme Court practice, handling tax matters, writ petitions and constitutional civil and criminal appeals. She was also on the panel of lawyers for the West Bengal government in the Supreme Court from June 1974. On 10 January 1977, she was designated as a senior advocate by the Supreme Court.

In 1978, Leila Seth became a Judge of the Delhi High Court, breaking the glass ceiling by becoming the first woman to do so. She later served as Acting Chief Justice of Delhi High Court twice in 1990 and 1991. Her career continued to rise as she became the Chief Justice of Himachal Pradesh High Court, again the first woman to be the Chief Justice of a State High Court.

Leila Seth chaired various judicial and humanitarian institutions. She was a member of the 15th Law Commission of India from 1997 to 2000, during which time she spearheaded the campaign to give daughters inheritance rights over ancestral property in the Hindu Succession Act (1956). She also served as the Chair of the Commonwealth Human Rights Initiative (CHRI) for several years. She served on the Humanities jury for the Infosys Prize from 2012 to 2016.

Justice Seth was also a part of various enquiry commissions, one of which was responsible for studying the effects of the television serial, Shaktiman (about a popular superhero) on children. Shaktiman was a popular TV series for children and it was the center of controversy because many children set themselves on fire or threw themselves off buildings hoping that Shaktiman would come and rescue them. She was also the single-member of the Justice Leila Seth Commission which enquired into the custodial death of businessman Rajan Pillai, or popularly known as "Biscuit Baron".

Significantly, Justice Seth was a part of the three member Justice Verma Commission instituted after the 2012 Delhi gang rape case to look into an overhaul of rape laws in India.

== Family ==
Justice Leila Seth married Prem Seth when she was 20 years old. They had three children together – Vikram Seth, Shantum Seth and Aradhana Seth. Vikram Seth went on to be a poet and author; Shantum Seth is a Buddhist teacher; and Aradhana is an artist, art director and filmmaker.

Leila Seth was vocal about supporting her son Vikram Seth when he came out as gay, and wrote extensively decrying Section 377 and in favour of LGBTQIA rights, including an op-ed in The Times Of India after the Koushal judgment in 2013 reinstated Section 377.

== Death ==
Justice Leila Seth died after suffering a cardio-respiratory attack on the night of 5 May 2017 at her residence in Noida, aged 86. She is survived by her husband, two sons and a daughter. As per her wishes no funeral was held. She had donated her eyes and other organs for transplant or medical research purposes.
