= M. S. Ramachandra Rao =

Indian physicist

Prof. M. S. Ramachandra Rao
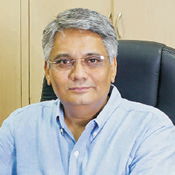
- Education: Indian Institute of Technology, Kharagpur
- Occupation: Chair Professor
- Awards: Humboldt Fellow, JSPS Fellow, Fellow of Institute of Physics (FInstP), UK
- Scientific career
- Fields: Condensed Matter Physics (Correlated oxide materials), Superconducting Diamond and NV centres in diamond for quantum applications, spin transport, diamond coatings for industrial applications, lab-grown diamond]
- Workplaces: Indian Institute of Technology (IIT) Madras

M. S. Ramachandra Rao is an Institute Chair Professor/Prof. R. Srinivasan Chair Professor and professor of physics in the Department of Physics at the Indian Institute of Technology Madras. He received the Alexander von Humboldt fellowship. He is also an IOP editorial board member from 2009 onwards.

== Awards and honours ==
1. Alexander von Humboldt Fellow, Germany
2. JSPS fellow, Japan; DST
3. FInstP (Fellow of the Institute of Physics (IOP), UK)
4. Board Member, J.PhysD. Appl. Phys., IOPP, US (since 2006)
5. Section editor; 'Condensed Matter: Advanced and Quantum Materials', JPhysD, IOPP, UK (since 2018)
6. Visiting Faculty, IISER, Trivandrum (2015-2019)
7. Visiting faculty, Shibaura Institute of Technology (SIT), Tokyo (since 2018)
8. Visiting Professor in the Erasmus-Mundus Master's program (Univ.Montpellier, France TUM,Germany, Univ. Rennes, France and Univ. of Torino, Italy) [since 2006]
