= Shashi Kant Seth =

9th Chief Justice of Himachal Pradesh High Court

Hon'ble Chief Justice (Retd.) Shashi Kant Seth
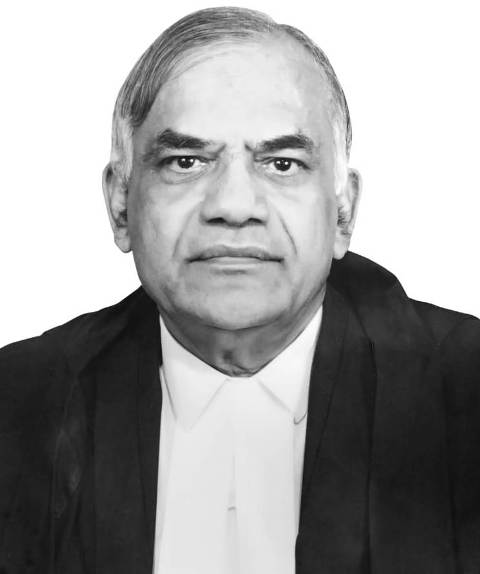

9th Chief Justice of Himachal Pradesh High Court
- In office 22 June 1993 – 27 August 1993
- Nominated by: M. N. Venkatachaliah
- Appointed by: S. D. Sharma
- Preceded by: Leila Seth; Bhawani Singh (acting)
- Succeeded by: Viswanathan Ratnam; Bhawani Singh (acting)

Judge of Madhya Pradesh High Court
- In office 27 November 1978 – 21 June 1993
- Nominated by: Y. V. Chandrachud
- Appointed by: N. S. Reddy

Personal details
- Born: 28 August 1931
- Died: Not known
- Education: M.A. and LL.B

Shashi Kant Seth or S. K. Seth (born 28 August 1931) was an Indian judge and 9th Chief Justice of the Himachal Pradesh High Court in 1993.

== Career ==
Seth completed M.A., LL.B. and was enrolled as an Advocate on 6 March 1962 and started practice in the Madhya Pradesh High Court. He served as Standing Counsel for Madhya Pradesh Electricity Board and University of Sagar before various Tribunals and subordinate courts. Seth appeared in different High Courts of India including the Calcutta High Court as an advocate. He was appointed additional judge of Madhya Pradesh High Court on 27 November 1978 and confirmed as permanent Judge in 1982. On 22 August 1993 he was appointed Chief Justice of Himachal Pradesh High Court. Justice Seth retired on 28 August 1993.
