= Madhavachari Srinivasan =

Indian judge (1937–2000)

Madhavachari Srinivasan or M. Srinivasan (12 January 1937 — 25 February 2000) was a judge of the Supreme Court of India.

== Career ==
Srinivasan was born in 1937 in British India. After completion of a Bachelor of Arts and Bachelor of Laws he was enrolled as an advocate in 1958 and started practice in Civil and Constitutional matters in the Madras High Court, Chennai. He was elevated as permanent judge of Madras High Court on 2 June 1986. Srinivasan was appointed Chief Justice of the Himachal Pradesh High Court on 12 August 1996. He was promoted to the judge of Supreme Court of India in March 1997. Srinivasan died in 2000.
