= Sabina (judge) =

Acting Chief Justice of Himachal Pradesh High Court

Hon'ble Acting Chief Justice (Retd.) Sabina

Judge of Himachal Pradesh High Court
- In office 8 October 2021 – 19 April 2023
- Nominated by: N. V. Ramana
- Appointed by: Ram Nath Kovind

Acting Chief Justice of Himachal Pradesh High Court
- In office 21 January 2023 – 19 April 2023
- Appointed by: Droupadi Murmu
- In office 25 May 2022 – 22 June 2022
- Appointed by: Ram Nath Kovind

Judge of Rajasthan High Court
- In office 11 April 2016 – 7 October 2021
- Nominated by: T. S. Thakur
- Appointed by: Pranab Mukherjee

Judge of Punjab and Haryana High Court
- In office 12 March 2008 – 10 April 2016
- Nominated by: K. G. Balakrishnan
- Appointed by: Pratibha Patil

Personal details
- Born: 20 April 1961 (age 65)

Sabina (born 20 April 1961) is an Indian judge. She was the Acting Chief Justice of Himachal Pradesh High Court and a former Judge of the Rajasthan High Court and the Punjab and Haryana High Court.
