= Madhavpur Ghed =

Madhavpur
- Village
- Location in Gujarat, India Madhavpur (India)
- Coordinates: 21.299291°N 70.025139°E
- Country: India
- State: Gujarat
- Region: Saurashtra
- District: Porbandar
- Named for: Krishna

Government
  - Type: Gram Panchayat
  - Body: Madhavpur Gram Panchayat

Languages
  - Official: Gujarati
- Time zone: UTC+5:30 (IST)
- PIN: 362230
- Vehicle registration: GJ-25

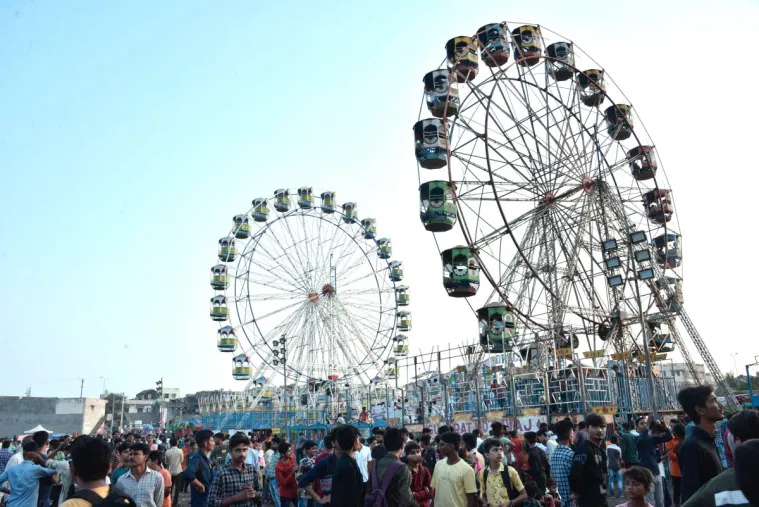
A photograph of the Madhavpur Mela, an annual festival celebrating the marriage of Krishna and Rukmini

Madhavpur (Ghed) is a culturally significant village in state of Gujarat, India. It lies on the seashore of Porbandar district. According to folklore, Krishna married Rukmini at Madhavpur. This event is memorialized with a temple dedicated to Lord Madhavrai and by an annual fair held in the village.

== Etymology ==
The term Madhav is a traditional epithet of the Hindu deity Krishna, meaning "honey-like," and Madhavpur therefore means "town of Madhav." The suffix "Ghed" is derived from the Gujarati word ghado ("pot"), referring to the area's bowl-shaped coastal terrain that fills with water during the monsoon season.

== Legend ==
According to local legend, Madhavpur Ghed is believed to be the site where Krishna married Rukmini. The story holds that Rukmini, daughter of King Bhishmaka, wished to marry Krishna, but her brother Rukmi opposed the marriage. Krishna then abducted Rukmini and married her at Madhavpur in Gujarat. An ancient temple dedicated to Krishna as Madhav Rai marks the site of the supposed wedding.

== Geography ==
Madhavpur lies on the western coast of Gujarat, facing the Arabian Sea. The village is characterised by flat coastal terrain with sandy beaches and surrounding agricultural land. It is located to the southeast of Dwarka and forms part of the broader coastal belt of the Saurashtra peninsula. The region experiences a tropical climate, with hot summers, a monsoon season, and mild winters.

== Madhavrai Temple ==
Madhavpur is the site of an ancient temple of Madhavraiji, who is a form of Lord Krishna. The original temple has been badly damaged by attacks by Muslim invaders, and the ruins of the structure are still present. The current temple was re-built by Shri Rupaniba, the Queen of Porbandar in 1840. This new temple is currently used for worship adjacent to the old one.

== Transportation ==
Madhavpur is connected to nearby towns and cities through a network of state highways and local roads. The village lies close to the Gujarat coastline and is accessible by road from major urban centres in the Saurashtra region.

=== Road ===
Madhavpur is well connected by road to Porbandar, which serves as the nearest major city. State highways and local roads link Madhavpur to surrounding cities such as Dwarka and Somnath. Gujarat State Road Transport Corporation (GSRTC) buses and private vehicles provide regular connectivity to Dwarka and other nearby destinations.

=== Rail ===
The nearest railway station is Keshod railway station, located approximately 39 kilometres from Madhavpur. It is connected to major cities in Gujarat and other parts of India through regular passenger and express trains.

=== Air ===
The closest airport is Keshod Airport, which offers domestic flight connectivity to select Indian cities. The airport serves as the primary air travel point for residents and visitors traveling to and from Madhavpur.

== Annual Fair ==
The Madhavpur Fair (Madhavpur Mela) is held annually during the Hindu month of Chaitra (March-April), beginning on Ram Navami. The five-day event commemorates the wedding of Krishna and Rukmini. Rituals observed during the fair include Mandap Ropan (erection of the wedding canopy), Shrini Varnagi or Fuleku Yatra (evening procession), and Mameru (a ceremony involving maternal relatives). A major attraction is the chariot procession in which an idol of Krishna is taken through the village.

In recent years, the fair has expanded into a larger cultural festival featuring folk performances from Gujarat and North-Eastern states such as Arunachal Pradesh, Assam, and Manipur under the Ek Bharat Shreshtha Bharat initiative. The event also includes handicraft stalls, food fairs, and beach activities. The Government of Gujarat promotes the festival as a major tourism event; in 2025, it was inaugurated on 6 April by the Chief Minister.

== Vallabhacharya's Bethak ==
Madhavpur is also culturally significant as the location of one of the Baithaks of Vallabhacharya, the founder of the Pushtimarg sect of Vaishnavism. Situated near the Kadam Kund, this site is the 66th of the 84 Baithaks established by Vallabhacharya.

== See also ==
- Somnath Temple
- Dwarka
- Krishna
- Rukmini
