= Rajiv Shakdher =

Chief Justice of Himachal Pradesh High Court

Hon'ble Chief Justice (Retd.) Rajiv Shakdher

Chief Justice of Himachal Pradesh High Court
- In office 25 September 2024 – 18 October 2024
- Nominated by: Dhananjaya Y. Chandrachud
- Appointed by: Droupadi Murmu
- Preceded by: M. S. Ramachandra Rao
- Succeeded by: Gurmeet Singh Sandhawalia

Judge of Delhi High Court
- In office January 2018 – 24 September 2024
- Nominated by: Dipak Misra
- Appointed by: Ram Nath Kovind

Judge of Madras High Court
- In office 11 April 2016 – January 2018
- Nominated by: Tirath Singh Thakur
- Appointed by: Pranab Mukherjee

Judge of Delhi High Court
- In office 11 April 2008 – 10 April 2016
- Nominated by: K. G. Balakrishnan
- Appointed by: Pratibha Patil

Personal details
- Born: 19 October 1962 (age 63)

Rajiv Shakdher (born 19 October 1962) is a retired Indian judge. He served as Chief Justice of the Himachal Pradesh High Court. He is a former Judge of Delhi High Court and Madras High Court.

== Early life ==
Shakdher was born into a Kashmiri Pandit family and completed his schooling in New Delhi.
