= Gurmeet Singh Sandhawalia =

Indian judge (born 1965)

Hon'ble Justice Gurmeet Singh Sandhawalia

30th Chief Justice of Himachal Pradesh High Court
- Incumbent
- Assumed office 29 December 2024
- Nominated by: D. Y. Chandrachud
- Appointed by: Droupadi Murmu
- Preceded by: Rajiv Shakdher; Tarlok Singh Chauhan (acting)

Judge of Punjab and Haryana High Court
- In office 30 September 2011 – 28 December 2024; Acting CJ: 4 February 2024 – 8 July 2024
- Nominated by: S. H. Kapadia
- Appointed by: Pratibha Patil

Personal details
- Born: 1 November 1965 (age 60)
- Parent: Surjit Singh Sandhawalia
- Education: B. A. (Hons.) LLB (Punjab University)
- Alma mater: DAV College, Chandigarh; Panjab University

Gurmeet Singh Sandhawalia (born 1 November 1965) is an Indian judge. He served as Chief Justice of Himachal Pradesh High Court. He previously served as a judge in the Punjab and Haryana High Court.

== Early life ==
G. S. Sandhawalia was born on 1 November 1965.

His father Surjit Singh Sandhawalia was Chief Justice of Punjab and Haryana High Court from 1978 to 1983, and of the Patna High Court from 1983 to 1987

He did his B.A. (Hons.) from DAV College, Chandigarh in 1986 and his L.L.B from Panjab University, Chandigarh in 1989.

== Career ==
He enrolled as an advocate with the Bar Council of Punjab and Haryana, Chandigarh in August in the same year. He handled criminal, civil, service, land acquisition and constitutional law as a private advocate, besides serving on judicial panels. He was a sportsman during his college days representing his College and University in tennis.

He was elevated to the Bench of Punjab and Haryana High Court on 30 September 2011, as an additional Judge and later confirmed as permanent judge on 24 January 2014.

He served as the Executive Chairman of the Punjab State Legal Services Authority. He became Acting Chief Justice of Punjab and Haryana High Court on 4 February 2024 and remained until the appointment of Sheel Nagu as permanent chief justice on 8 July 2024.

On 11 July 2024, a Supreme Court collegium led by then CJI Dhananjaya Y. Chandrachud recommended his elevation as Chief Justice of the Madhya Pradesh High Court, but later suppressed that resolution and in its resolution dated 17 September 2024 recommended his appointment as Chief Justice of Himachal Pradesh High Court. Central Government cleared his appointment on 25 December 2024 and he assumed the position as Chief Justice of High Court of Himachal Pradesh on 29 December 2024.
