= Viswanathan Ratnam =

Indian judge (1932–2020)

Hon'ble Chief Justice (Retd.) Viswanathan Ratnam

10th Chief justice of Himachal Pradesh High Court
- In office 29 January 1994 – 31 July 1994
- Nominated by: M. N. Venkatachaliah
- Appointed by: S. D. Sharma
- Preceded by: Shashi Kant Seth; Bhawani Singh (acting)
- Succeeded by: Gulab Chand Gupta; Bhawani Singh (acting)

Judge of Madras High Court
- In office 25 January 1979 – 28 January 1994
- Nominated by: Y. V. Chandrachud
- Appointed by: Neelam Sanjiva Reddy
- Acting Chief Justice
- In office 15 November 1992 – 30 June 1993
- Appointed by: S. D. Sharma
- Preceded by: Kanta Kumari Bhatnagar
- Succeeded by: K. A. Swamy

Personal details
- Born: 1 August 1932
- Died: 23 May 2020 (aged 87) Chennai, Tamil Nadu
- Education: B.Sc and LL.B

Viswanathan Ratnam (1 August 1932 – 23 May 2020) was an Indian judge and politician. He served as Chief Justice of the Himachal Pradesh High Court and Governor of Himachal Pradesh.

== Life and career ==
Ratnam was born in 1932. He passed B.Sc., LL.B. and was enrolled as an Advocate on 25 July 1955. He started practice on Civil and Labour matters in the Madras High Court. Ratnam became a member of the Executive Committee of the Tamil Nadu Legal Aid Board. On 25 January 1979, he was appointed permanent judge of Madras High Court. Since 15 November 1992, he also took charge of the Acting Chief Justice of Madras High Court. Justice Ratnam was elevated in the post of Chief Justice of Himachal Pradesh High Court on 29 January 1994 and retired on 1 August 1994 from the post. He also took charge in the post of Governor of Himachal Pradesh for 19 days.

Ratnam died from COVID-19 on 23 May 2020, at the age of 87.
