= Doraiswamy Raju =

Indian judge (born 1939)

Doraiswamy Raju or D. Raju (born 2 July 1939) is a retired Indian judge, born in Kanyakumari District, Tamilnadu who served as a justice of the Supreme Court of India.

== Career ==
Raju graduated in 1959 and obtained B.L. degree in law in 1961 from Madras University. In 1962 he was enrolled as an advocate in Madras Bar Association and started practice in various High Courts of India on civil, constitutional, taxation and land-related matters. Raju worked as standing counsel for various public institutions and undertakings of Tamil Nadu and Andhra Pradesh Government including Food Corporation of India. He was designated as senior advocate of Madras High Court in 1987. He was appointed a judge of the same High Court in 1990. On 17 November 1995, Raju became the chairman of the Advisory Board of COFEPOSA. He was elevated in the post of chief justice of the Himachal Pradesh High Court on 1 July 1998 and in 2000 he was appointed justice of the Supreme Court of India. Raju retired from the court on 1 July 2004.
