= State of Himachal Pradesh Act, 1970 =

Act of the Parliament of India

Parliament of India
- Long title: An Act to provide for the establishment of the State of Himachal Pradesh and for matters connected therewith.
- Passed by: Parliament of India
- Passed: 18 December 1970
- Status: In force

The State of Himachal Pradesh Act, 1970 is an Act of the Parliament of India by which Himachal Pradesh was given the status of a full state of India. According to this Act, on 25 January 1971, the Union Territory of Himachal Pradesh became the 18th state of India.

== History ==
After the independence of India, the Chief Commissioner's Province of Himachal Pradesh was organised on 15 April 1948 as a result of the integration of 28 petty princely states (including feudal princes and zaildars) in the promontories of the western Himalayas. These were known as the Simla Hills States and four Punjab southern hill states under the Himachal Pradesh (Administration) Order, 1948 under Sections 3 and 4 of the Extra-Provincial Jurisdiction Act, 1947 (later renamed as the Foreign Jurisdiction Act, 1947 vide A.O. of 1950). Bilaspur princely state was merged into Himachal Pradesh on 1 July 1954 by the Himachal Pradesh and Bilaspur (New State) Act, 1954.

Himachal became a Part 'C' state on 26 January 1950 when Constitution of India came into effect and the Lieutenant Governor was appointed. The Legislative Assembly was elected in 1952. Himachal Pradesh became a union territory on 1 November 1956. Some areas of Punjab State, namely, Simla, Kangra, Kullu and Lahul and Spiti Districts, Lohara, Amb and Una Kanungo circles, some areas of Santokhgarh Kanungo circle and some other specified area of Una Tehsil of Hoshiarpur District, as well as Kandaghat and Nalagarh Tehsils of erstwhile PEPSU State, besides some parts of Dhar Kalan Kanungo circle of Pathankot District—were merged with Himachal Pradesh on 1 November 1966 on the enactment by Parliament of the Punjab Reorganisation Act, 1966. On 18 December 1970, the State of Himachal Pradesh Act was passed by Parliament, and the new state came into being on 25 January 1971. Himachal became the 18th state of the Indian Union with Dr. Yashwant Singh Parmar as its first chief minister.
