= Amjad Ahtesham Sayed =

Former Chief Justice of Himachal Pradesh High Court

Hon'ble Chief Justice (Retd.) Amjad Ahtesham Sayed
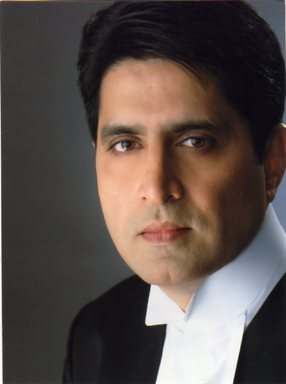

Chief Justice of Himachal Pradesh High Court
- In office 23 June 2022 – 20 January 2023
- Nominated by: N. V. Ramana
- Appointed by: Ram Nath Kovind

Judge of Bombay High Court
- In office 11 April 2007 – 22 June 2022
- Nominated by: K. G. Balakrishnan
- Appointed by: A. P. J. Abdul Kalam

Personal details
- Born: 21 January 1961 (age 65)
- Education: Bombay University

Amjad Ahtesham Sayed (born 21 January 1961) is a former Indian judge. He served as a former Chief Justice of Himachal Pradesh High Court and Judge of Bombay High Court.

== Career ==
Justice Sayed was born on 21 January 1961. He obtained a bachelor's degree in Law from Bombay University in 1984. He was elevated as an Additional Judge of Bombay High Court on 11 April 2007 and made Permanent Judge on 9 April 2007. He was appointed as Chief Justice of Himachal Pradesh High Court on 23 June 2022. He retired on 20 January 2023.
