= Chief justice =

Presiding member of a supreme court

The chief justice is the presiding member of a supreme court in many countries with a justice system based on English common law, and provincial or state supreme courts/high courts.

The situation is slightly different in the three legal jurisdictions within the United Kingdom. The courts of England and Wales are headed by the Lord Chief Justice of England and Wales; in Northern Ireland's courts, the equivalent position is the Lord Chief Justice of Northern Ireland, and in the courts of Scotland the head of the judiciary of Scotland is the Lord President of the Court of Session, who is also Lord Justice General of Scotland. These three judges are not, though, part of the Supreme Court of the United Kingdom, which operates across all three jurisdictions and is headed by the President of the Supreme Court of the United Kingdom.

The chief justice can be selected in many ways, but, in many nations, the position is given to the most senior justice of the court, while, in the United States, the chief justice is appointed by the President, subject to approval by the United States Senate. Although the title of this top American jurist is, by statute, Chief Justice of the United States, the term "Chief Justice of the Supreme Court" is often used unofficially.

In some courts, the chief justice has a different title, e.g. President of the supreme court. In other courts, the title of chief justice is used, but the court has a different name, e.g. the Supreme Court of Judicature in colonial (British) Ceylon, the Constitutional Court of South Africa, and the Supreme Court of Appeals of West Virginia (in the US state of West Virginia).

== Competence ==
The chief justice's personal ruling is equal in weight to the rulings of any associate judges on the court.

In several countries, the chief justice is second in line to the office of president or governor general (or third in line, if there is a vice president or lieutenant governor general), should the incumbent die or resign. For example, if the Governor General of Canada is unable to perform the duties of the office, the Chief Justice of Canada performs the duties of the governor general. In India, in the event the President and the Vice- President are unable to discharge the functions due to death, resignation or removal, the Chief Justice of India acts as Officiating President of India.

Apart from their intrinsic role in litigation, they may have additional responsibilities, such as swearing in high officers of state; for instance, the Chief Justice of the United States traditionally administers the oath of office at the inauguration ceremony of the President of the United States, as does the Chief Justice of South Africa at the inauguration of the President of South Africa. In some countries, such as the United States, the chief justice is also responsible for presiding over certain legislative matters, such as during the impeachment trial of a president.

== List of chief justice positions ==
- Bailiff of Guernsey
- Bailiff of Jersey
- Chief Justice of Afghanistan
- Chief Justice of Albania
- Chief Justice of Antigua
- Chief Justice of Australia
  - Chief Justice of New South Wales
  - Chief Justice of Queensland
  - Chief Justice of South Australia
  - Chief Justice of Tasmania
  - Chief Justice of Victoria
  - Chief Justice of Western Australia
- Chief Justice of the Bahamas
- Chief Justice of Bangladesh
- Chief Justice of Barbados
- Chief Justice of Belize
- Chief Justice of Bermuda
- Chief Justice of Borneo
- Chief Justice of Brazil
- Chief Justice of Canada
  - Chief Justice of Alberta
  - Chief Justice of British Columbia
  - Chief Justice of Prince Edward Island
  - Chief Justice of Manitoba
  - Chief Justice of New Brunswick
  - Chief Justice of Newfoundland and Labrador
  - Chief Justice of Nova Scotia
  - Chief Justice of Ontario
  - Chief Justice of Quebec
  - Chief Justice of Saskatchewan
- Chief Justice of China
- Chief Justice of Cyprus
- Chief Justice of the Supreme Court of Estonia
- Chief Justice of Fiji
- Chief Justice of Ghana
- Chief Justice of Gibraltar
- Chief Justice of Grenada
- Chief Justice of Guyana
- Chief Justice of Hong Kong
- Chief Justice of Hungary
- Chief Justice of India
  - Chief Justice of the Bombay High Court
  - Chief Justice of Gujarat
  - Chief Justice of Himachal Pradesh
  - Chief Justice of the Patna High Court
  - Chief Justice of Uttarakhand
- Chief Justice of the Supreme Court of Indonesia
  - Chief Justice of the Constitutional Court of Indonesia
- Chief Justice of Iran
- Chief Justice of Ireland
- Chief Justice of Jamaica
- Chief Justice of Japan
- Chief Justice of Kenya
- Chief Justice of Kiribati
- Chief Justice of the Supreme Court of Korea
  - President of the Constitutional Court of Korea
- Chief Justice of the Leeward Islands
- Chief Justice of Liberia
- Chief Justice of Malta
- Chief Justice of Malaysia
- Chief Justice of the Federated States of Micronesia
- Chief Justice of Namibia
- Chief Justice of Nauru
- Chief Justice of Nepal
- Chief Justice of New Zealand
- Chief Justice of Nigeria
- Chief Justice of the Supreme Court of Norway
- Chief Justice of Pakistan
  - Chief Justices of the Federal Shariat Court
  - Chief Justice of the Islamabad High Court
- Chief Justice of the Philippines
- Chief Justice of the Russian Federation
- Chief Justice of Singapore
- Chief Justice of Sri Lanka
- Chief Justice of South Africa
- Chief Justice of St Lucia
- Chief Justice of St Vincent
- Chief Justice of Sudan
- Chief Justice of Tanzania
  - Chief Justice of Zanzibar
- Chief Justice of Tonga
- Chief Justice of Trinidad and Tobago
- President of the Supreme Court of the United Kingdom
  - Lord Chief Justice of England and Wales
  - Lord President of the Court of Session and Lord Justice General of Scotland
  - Lord Chief Justice of Northern Ireland
- Chief Justice of the United States

== See also ==
- Associate justice
- Puisne judge
- Chief Justice of the Common Pleas
- Lord President of the Supreme Court
- Chief judge (United States)
