= Lady Doctors =

Book by Kavitha Rao

Lady Doctors: The Untold Stories of India's First Women in Medicine
- Author: Kavitha Rao
- Language: English
- Subject: Biography
- Published: 2021
- Publisher: Westland Books (2021), Jacaranda Books (2023)
- Publication place: India (2021); UK (2023)
- Pages: 245
- ISBN: 978-1-914-34499-2

Lady Doctors: The Untold Stories of India's First Women in Medicine is a book about six of India's first Indian female physicians in Western medicine. It was written by journalist, author and lawyer Kavitha Rao, and first published in 2021 by Westland Books in India, and in the UK by Jacaranda Books in 2023. In it contains the stories of Anandibai Joshi, Kadambini Ganguly, Rukhmabai Raut, Haimabati Sen, Muthulakshmi Reddy, and Mary Poonen Lukose, all born in the late nineteenth century.

In 2021 the book was long listed for Tata's literary awards in the category of non-fiction book of the year. The Hindu noted "the stories weave a rich pattern depicting the struggles these women had to overcome to carve out their careers, and in the process, build a path for other women to follow." The Tribune acknowledged Rao for "her indepth research". The Telegraph India criticised it for being "a mere who’s who" and called it "a general book for an interested readership", but lacks an answer as to why these lady doctors were chiefly associated with reproductive medicine, and misses "references to the complex social context in which these women operated.". The Asian Journal of Women's Studies described the book as written in a "scholarly manner", "the first of its kind", and "presents a clear picture of the discursive patterns of patriarchy".

== Background ==
At the time of the 2021 publication, the author, Kavitha Rao, living in London, worked as a journalist, having studied arts and law at the National Law School of India University, Bangalore, and been legal correspondent for The Economic Times. Lady Doctors is her third book. The idea of the book was inspired when she noticed a Google Doodle of Rukhmabai Raut. She was also influenced by Angela Saini's book titled Inferior.

According to Rao, she was unable to find historical material on some other Indian female physicians that could have been included in her book. As a result, accounts of the Madras Medical College graduate Anna Jagannathan, the Grant Medical College graduate Motibai Kapadia, and Mumbai born Jerusha Jhirad are not included.

== Characters ==
Main lady doctors

- Anandibai Joshi
- Kadambini Ganguly
- Rukhmabai Raut
- Haimabati Sen
- Muthulakshmi Reddy
- Mary Poonen Lukose

Other lady doctors

- Chandramukhi Basu
- Edith Pechey
- Pandita Ramabai

Husbands

- Dwarkanath Ganguly

Journalists

- Henry Curwen

Law

- Lyttleton Bayley
- Charles Frederick Farran
- Charles Sargent
- Kashinath Trimbak Telang

Social reformers

- Behramji Malabari

== Content ==
Lady Doctors has seven chapters, preceded by an introduction, and followed by an epilogue, endnotes, bibliography, acknowledgements, and a paragraph about the author. There are no photographs. In the introduction, Rao, writes that these first Indian females trained in Western medicine during British rule, and were commonly called lady doctors. (Note: Rao notes that the term 'Lady surgeons' was first used in a British Medical Journal article in 1870.) They left home, defied rules of tradition and caste, addressed men, and faced verbal abuse, at a time when Indian women were chiefly housebound, and had limited access to education. Relatively little is known about them, archival material is scarce, and they are not household names. They do not appear frequently in history books, and when they do, often their successes are credited to their husbands or fathers who are seen to have allowed them to pursue medical careers. She follows on with a chapter titled "The Originals", stating that to understand these Indian lady doctors, one must look at female doctors on an international level.

=== Anandibai Joshi ===
Rao's first biography, titled "The Good Wife", is of Anandibai Joshi (1865 – 1887), who as a nine year old child was married to a man aged 29 years. He followed one of the reform trends of the time in promoting the education of women, though sometimes beating his wife when she did not keep up with her studies. Rao reveals Joshi's views as related in her letters to her husband. He failed to offer her the affection she did not receive from her mother, and possibly used Joshi to fulfil gaps in his own failures. Following the death of their baby boy, Joshi aspired to become a physician. She was taken under the wing of an American missionary later would surpringly for its time, address a group of men. Having impressed Rachel Bodley, the Dean of the Woman's Medical College of Pennsylvania, Joshi was admitted with a grand reception. Repeatedly ill, she refused to take the prescribed meat broth, and instead of wearing warmer clothing, she just adjusted her sari style. She resisted conversion to Christianity. For this, Rao says, she was largely credited by Indians. Rao, reflecting on press releases of that time, compares and contrasts Joshi to Pandita Ramabai, who unlike Joshi, is critical of child marriage and Hinduism. Joshi however died shortly after graduating and before she could take up any medical appointment. Rao points to her husband as having used her for his own fame.

=== Kadambini Ganguly ===
"The Working Mom", is Kadambini Ganguly (1861 – 1923), who studied and practiced while bringing up eight children. She is credited for being the first Indian woman to practice medicine in India, and one of two Indian women to be first to graduate in India. Books about her have been mostly in Bengali and she is therefore relatively unknown outside that state. Like Joshi, she was born during the Bengali renaissance led by the Brahmo Samaj, a movement that encouraged the education of women, though it split into several branches, which differed in opinions on how and how much to educate them. Ganguly's father, Brijkishore, was a headmaster, part of the Brahmo Samaj, and with Annette Ackroyd was a co-founder of the Hindu Mahila Vidyalaya, a school that promoted equality of the sexes. There, Ganguly was allowed to have lessons in maths and sciences, subjects that were typically not for bringing up perfect Hindu women. There, she also met and later married her tutor Dwarkanath Ganguly. Restricted in where and what to do next, she entered Bethune College with a scholarship, and from there gained a BA in 1882, along with Chandramukhi Bose. Praised by some, others felt intimidated by the new educated females. Unlike the marriage of Joshi, Rao comments that Ganguly's husband had been seen as supportive, a mentor and her guide. She began at CMC in 1883, but failed the final in 1886 by one mark and as a result received the lesser Graduate of Bengal Medical College. Though she did not benefit from funds of the Dufferin funds, she did go on to work for them; a role endorsed by Florence Nightingale. However, Ganguly found herself having to advertise her services. Indian female physicians had to compete with European female doctors, who generally took up more senior positions. According to Rao, she was inspired by the Edinburgh Seven and in 1893, she passed several medical diplomas from Edinburgh University, following which she set up her own private practice back in India. Encouraged by her husband, she entered National Congress sessions, and became the first woman to speak at one in 1890. The chapter ends with her legacy of the lady doctors that followed the path she paved way for, and the name of a ward at the CMC.

=== Rukhmabai Raut ===
Rukhmabai Raut (1864 - 1955), known as the first Hindu woman to seek a divorce, is credited with contributing, along with the later Phulmoni Dasi rape case of 1889, to paving the way for legislation that changed the minimum age of marriage for females. She was born into the historically oppressive carpenter caste, and married at the age of 11 years. She had grown up with her physician step-father, Sakharam Arjun, a liberal man considered one of Raut's most significant influencers, according to Rao. Unable to prevent the marriage, Arjun refused to let her go to her husband and kept her at home for eight years, before she received a legal notice to move in with her husband. During that time, Arjun had allowed Raut to study and network with others around him. She later fought in court to be free from the marriage by becoming what Rao calls "The Rule Breaker". To her husband, she was to be a devoted Hindu wife, home maker and bringer of a generous dowry. He had however turned out to be uneducated, poor, and ill. To her, marriage was an obstacle to her aspirations and freedom. Rao describes how Raut becomes a political football between colonialists and Indians, and between different groups of Indians. Unfavourable press was particularly received in the Kesari and Maratha, from Bal Gangadhar Tilak, a nationalist in the self-rule movement and believer in restricted education for lower castes and women, who praised Joshi for being a 'good wife' but criticised Raut, particularly following the publication of her opinions in Henry Curwen's The Times of India. Rao notes Rudyard Kipling and other colonialist supporters argued that the Hindu laws that restricted education for Raut, was evidence that Indians could not represent themselves in politics. Initially Justice Robert Hill Pinhey made judgement in her favour. Later, not wishing to come into conflict with Hindu laws, Charles Sargent and Lyttleton Bayley reversed the decision and Raut was ordered to either go to her husband or receive a prison sentence. Here, Rao notes that before the notion of passive resistance was widely known, the woman Raut opts for prison, though eventually settles by paying him off. With the help of Edith Pechey, Raut gained admission to the London School of Medicine for Women.

=== Haimabati Sen ===
Rao names Haimabati Sen (1866 - 1933) "The Fighter", as she was born into a family who wished her to have been boy, was not sent to school, was widowed as a child and had neither support of a husband or liberal contacts. Despite this, she studied at the Campbell Medical College, and became a physician with a career at the Lady Dufferin Women's Hospital.

=== Muthulakshmi Reddy ===
The chapter titled "The Lawmaker" is about Muthulakshmi Reddy (1886 - 1968).

=== Mary Poonen Lukose ===
"The Surgeon general" is about Mary Poonen Lukose (1886 - 1976).

== Publication ==
The book was first published in 2021 by Westland Books in India, and in the UK by Jacaranda Books in 2023.

== Response ==
In 2021, judges Dilip D'Souza, Nivedita Menon, Sanjay Johri, Amrita Shah, and Tina Nagpaul, long listed the book for Tata's literary awards in the category of non-fiction book of the year. The Hindu mentioned the book, noting "the stories weave a rich pattern depicting the struggles these women had to overcome to carve out their careers, and in the process, build a path for other women to follow." The Tribune acknowledged Rao for "her indepth research".

Lakshmi Subramanian of the Telegraph India notes that the lives of the six women in the book are inspiring, though in her opinion it "reads more or less like a mere who’s who of ‘lady doctors’ and does not go beyond the narrative inherent in the sources that it uses." Subramanian calls the book a "desultory read" as she finds that interpretation of the primary sources used is lacking. She goes on to say that "the author makes no attempt whatsoever to contextualise the stories and retells them in line with whatever is already known." She calls it "a general book for an interested readership", but lacks an answer as to why these lady doctors were chiefly associated with reproductive medicine, and misses "references to the complex social context in which these women operated." According to Rao herself, she told Eastern Eye that " It was a massive challenge, and I don’t think I’ve done enough." A review in the Asian Journal of Women's Studies described the book as written in a "scholarly manner", "the first of its kind", and "presents a clear picture of the discursive patterns of patriarchy".
