= West Bengal blood test kit scam =

Early 21st century scandal in West Bengal

The West Bengal blood test scam was an instance in which an Indian company, Monozyme India, sold thousands of defective blood test kits to various medical facilities in the Indian State of West Bengal. The resulting increase in cases of infectious diseases led to a government probe, the arrest of several prominent directors of Monozyme India, and widespread criticism being levied against the healthcare system of West Bengal.

== Description ==
=== Background ===
The blood test scam took place in the Indian state of West Bengal. Due to the region's lower level of economic development, the West Bengal medical system of the early 2000s was noted as being underfunded and thus providing substandard care. Despite these shortcomings, the Bengal medical system did contain a number of public and private blood banks, which provided the wider system with supply of blood. To ensure that donated blood was safe to use in blood transfusions, the various banks and hospitals used blood test kits to test blood for infectious diseases.

=== Sale of defective tests ===
In 2004, several West Bengali healthcare facilities placed a new contract for blood test kits; these new kits would be used to help detect Hepatitis B, Hepatitis C and HIV in blood, thus allowing for safer transfusions. Several bids were made, with one Secunderabad-based company, Monozyme India, winning the contract. It was later revealed that Monozyme India had offered to sell blood test kits for 20 Rupees a unit, as opposed to the 60-70 rupees offered by other companies. Among dozens of other facilities, Monozyme India provided kits to 8 blood transfusion centers in West Bengal.

Starting in 2005, an uptick of blood-transmissible disease infections was reported by several medical facilities in West Bengal. These reports were investigated, and in September 2006 the NRS Medical College Blood Bank uncovered that thousands of blood test kits sold by Monozyme India had had their expiration date tampered with or removed. Testing found that these older, expired tests were defective and thus unable to determine if blood was infected. In response, the Indian police raided over 75 facilities that may be in possession of expired blood test kits, and a warning was sent out by the West Bengali healthcare network. As a result of the police raids, it was found that Monozyme India had sold 140,000 defective blood test kits between December 2004 and August 2006.

Due to the findings of West Bengal police and healthcare system, an investigation was launched regarding potential negligence by Monozyme India. In particular, there was concern that the company had knowingly violated the Drugs and Cosmetics Act of 1940, which prohibited the tampering of expiration dates of drugs. Random tests on the seized blood test kits showed that almost all of the kits were defective in some way; as such, legal and criminal action was taken against several high-level employees at Monozyme India. Particular focus was placed on two brothers, Ghanashyam and Govind Sarda. Govind was the owner of Monozyme India, and Ghanashyam had been managing director of the company from April 2005 to August 2006. Ghanashyam received considerable coverage in the media after he was arrested at an airport in Calcutta, allegedly while attempting to flee the ongoing investigation. Govind was also arrested.

=== Aftermath ===
In the aftermath of the situation, Indian authorities conducted a number of probes into the healthcare system of West Bengal.
