= Soonderbai Hannah Powar =

Indian philanthropist

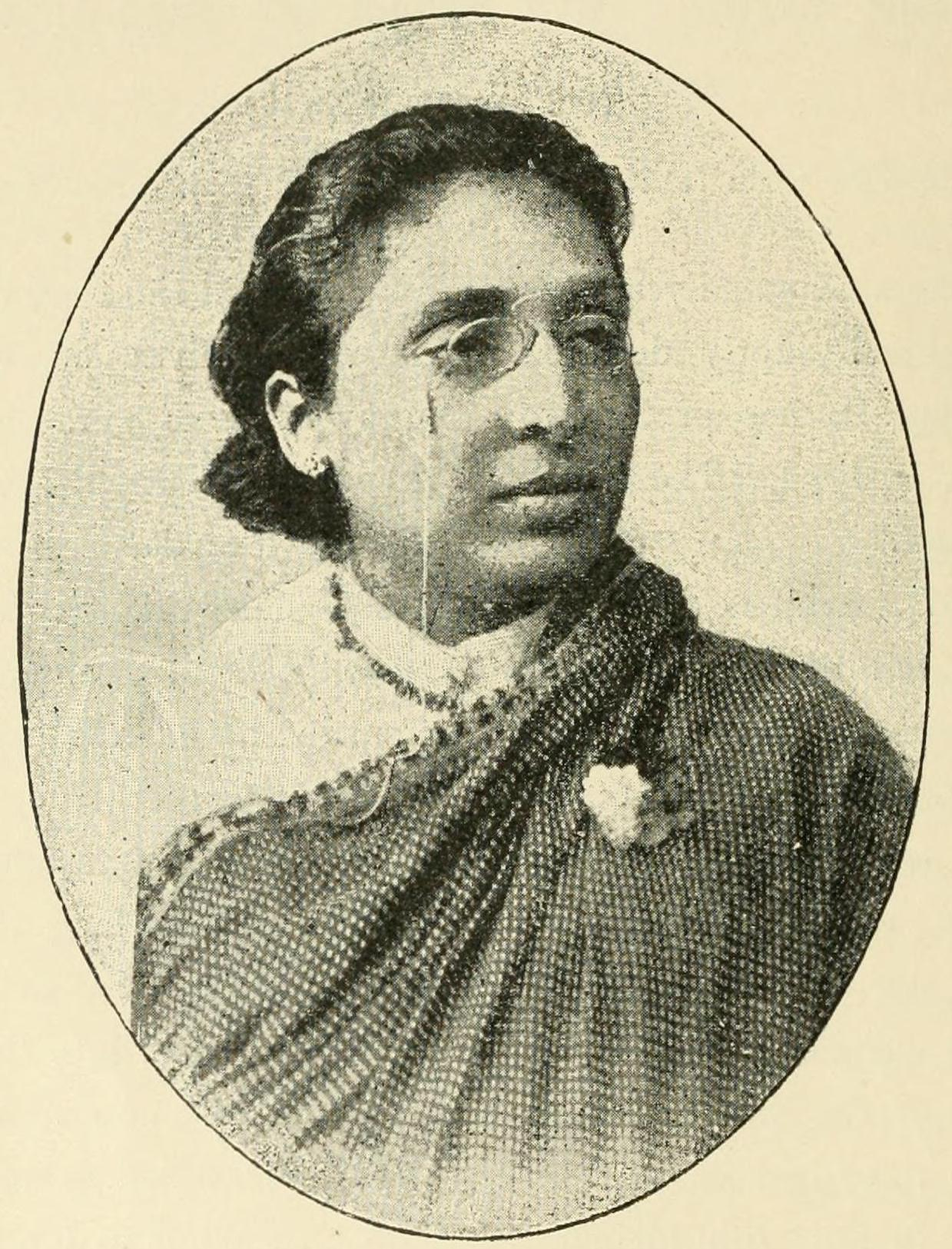
- Soonderbai Powar, from a 1900 publication.
- Born: Soonderi Hannah Powar; July 29, 1856
- Died: December 15, 1921 (aged 65)

Soonderbai Hannah Powar (July 29, 1856 – December 15, 1921) was an Indian Christian philanthropist and anti-opium activist. She worked closely with Pandita Ramabai.

== Early life ==
Soonderi Hannah Powar was born in 1856, the daughter of Christian converts Ganderbai and Ramachandra Powar.

== Career ==
Powar lectured on the opium trade, touring in Great Britain in 1888–1889 season, and again for the 1892–1893 season, with the support of the Bombay Guardian newspaper and the Women's Anti-Opium Urgency League. She wrote a 29-page pamphlet, An Indian Woman's Impeachment of the Opium Crime of the British Government: A Plea for Justice for Her Country People (1892), to accompany her second tour.

Powar ran a teacher training school, and worked closely with Pandita Ramabai at the Sharada Sadan (Abode of Wisdom), a refuge and school for child widows, started in Bombay and later moved to Pune and still later to Kedgaon. She took full charge of Sharada Sadan when Ramabai left for the United States in 1898. She wrote about the difficulties of Hindu girls and women in a book, Hinduism and Womanhood: Personal Histories showing the Fruits of Hinduism, written and compiled for the information of British Christian Women, and in Christian missionary publications, including The Indian Alliance in 1907.

After Powar's death in 1921, Kate Storrie wrote a biography, Soonderbai Powar: A Noble Worker for Indian Womanhood (1924), also published with the subtitle For 45 Years an Earnest Worker for God in India.
