= Henry Curwen =

Henry Curwen may refer to:

- Henry Curwen (1528–1596), member of parliament for Cumberland
- Henry Curwen (died 1623), member of parliament for Cumberland
- Henry Curwen (1728–1778), member of parliament for Cumberland and Carlisle
- Henry Curwen (journalist) (1845–1892), editor of the Times of India
