= Motibai Kapadia =

Indian physician (1867–1930)

Motibai Kapadia LRCP FRCS
- Born: 1867; Bombay, Bombay Presidency, British India
- Died: 1930 (aged 62–63)
- Education: Grant Medical College, Mumbai
- Known for: First Indian female graduate of Grant Medical College
- Medical career
- Profession: Physician
- Institutions: Victoria Jubilee Hospital for women, Ahmedabad, Bombay Presidency
- Awards: Kaisar-i-Hind Medal (1911)

Motibai Rustomji Kapadia LRCP FRCS (1867–1930) was an Indian doctor who is credited as the first Indian female physician in Western medicine to have trained alongside men in India. In 1884, she gained admission to Grant Medical College, Mumbai, from where she graduated. After gaining her Licentiate of the Royal College of Physicians (LRCP) she was appointed to head the Victoria Jubilee Hospital for women in Ahmedabad. In 1891, she qualified FRCS.

In 1911, Kapadia received the Kaisar-i-Hind Medal in the 1911 Delhi Durbar Honours following the Coronation of George V and Mary.

== Early life and education ==
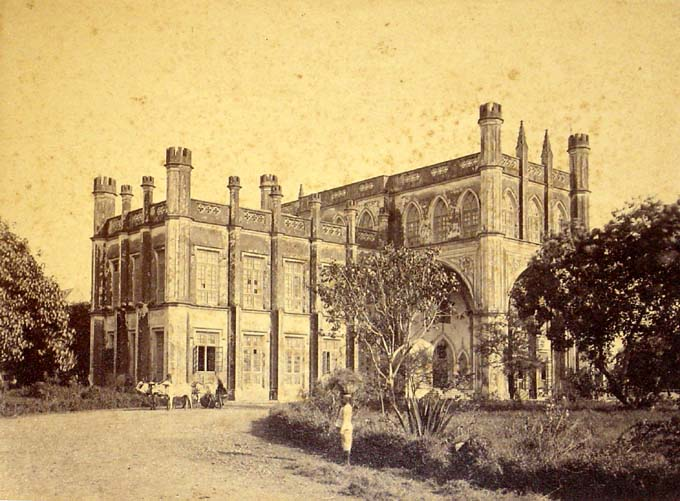
Old Grant Medical College building, 1860

Motibai Kapadia was born in 1867 in Mumbai, then Bombay, into a wealthy Parsi family. In 1884, despite opposition from several people she knew, Kapadia gained admission to Mumbai's Grant Medical College through the Dufferin Fund. (Note: 62 women were admitted to Grant in the six years preceding 1892.) There, her father allowed her to study alongside men. She graduated in 1887 and then worked at the Cama Hospital for a year. In 1888 she travelled to England and received the LRCP, along with Rattonbai Malabari.

== Career ==
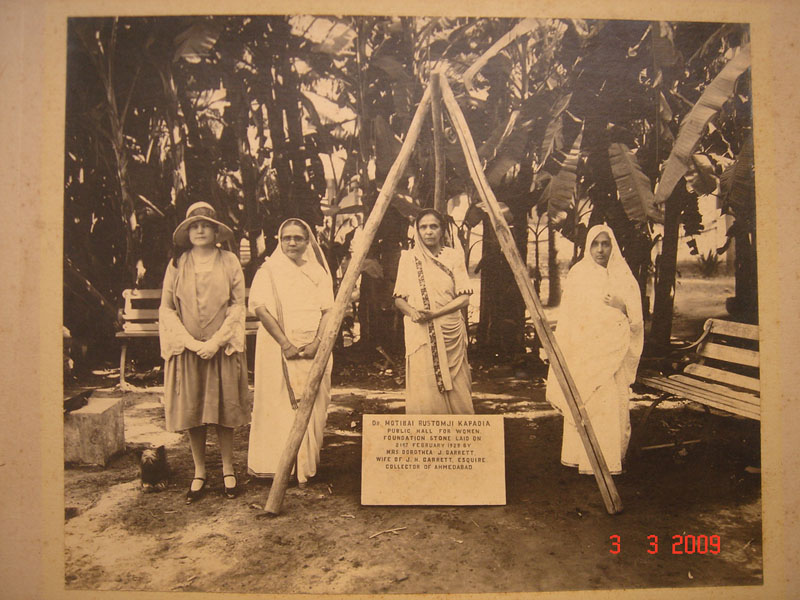
Dr Motibai Rustomji Kapadia Public Hall for Women (21 February 1928)

In 1889, after returning from Britain, the industrialist Ranchhodlal Chhotalal appointed Kapadia in charge of his newly established Victoria Jubilee Hospital and its dispensary in Ahmedabad, Gujarat, then in Bombay Presidency. There, she was a well-known lady doctor, who accomplished good work, and remained in that post for 36 years. In 1891, she qualified FRCS. In Ahmedabad, she lived in a street somewhere between Kalupur and Khadia. In 1897, she was chosen to represent the Ladies Club at Ahmedabad to deliver the draft English address in preparation for the Diamond Jubilee of Queen Victoria.

Kapadia later travelled back to Britain, after which she returned to India on the SS Devanha in 1921. According to Canadian educator Geraldine Forbes, Western medicine expanded in Bengal as a result of hospital assistants who trained in that field by physicians from Bombay that included Kapadia.

== Death and legacy ==
On 12 December 1911, Kapadia received the Kaisar-i-Hind Medal in the 1911 Delhi Durbar Honours following the Coronation of George V and Mary. Kapadia died in 1930. She has been credited with being the first Indian female physician in Western medicine to have trained alongside men in India. Historian Makrand Mehta credits Kapadia as a significant influencer of Gujarat. Author Kavitha Rao considered Kapadia notable enough to be included in her book Lady Doctors, though omitted her due to being unable to find enough archival material on her.
