= Cyriac Abby Philips =

Indian hepatologist

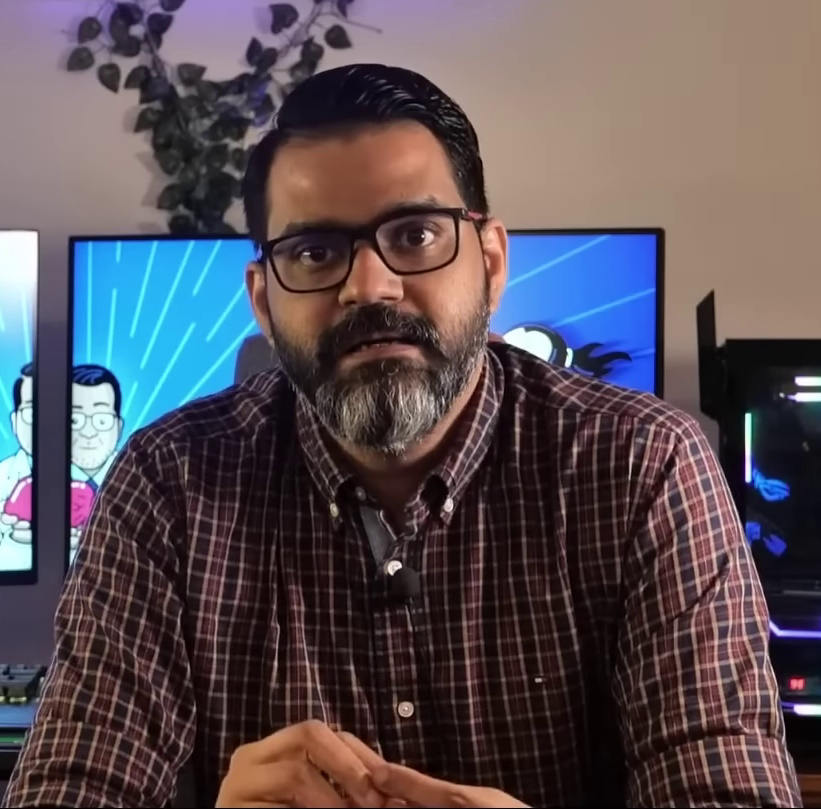
- Philips in 2023
- Born: Kottayam, Kerala, India
- Education: St. John's Medical College (MBBS); Nil Ratan Sircar Medical College and Hospital (MD); Institute of Liver and Biliary Sciences (DM)
- Occupations: Hepatologist; clinician-scientist
- Father: Philip Augustine

Cyriac Abby Philips is an Indian hepatologist. He shares critical views of alternative medicine based on his findings and research.

== Early life ==
Philips was born in Kottayam, in the state of Kerala, the third of four siblings.

== Career ==
In 2019, Philips co-authored a paper analyzing the death of a woman who died after taking Herbalife's dietary supplements, which was later retracted by Journal of Clinical and Experimental Hepatology. The retraction was undone, after microbiologist Elisabeth Bik and Retraction Watch, published the paper on their respective blogs.

Philips works as a senior consultant hepatologist and physician-scientist at Rajagiri Hospital in Kochi.

== Social media activism ==
Philips is known for airing his critical views of Ayurveda, Homeopathy and other alternative medicine systems, on Twitter and YouTube. According to him, the principles and practice of ayurveda are based on "essentially primitive, untested, observations from an ancient past which lack scientific rigour". He has faced defamation lawsuits from Kerala State Medical Council for Indian Systems of Medicine, Ayurveda Medical Association of India, and various ayurvedic medicine manufacturers. In a research published in Hepatology Communications, Philips and other researchers concluded that Homeopathic remedies can potentially result in severe liver injuries. He claims, "Homeopathy is not medicine, but an extreme form of quackery."

On 28 September 2023, Philips' X account was suspended after an interim injunction order was passed by a Bengaluru court for defaming Himalaya Wellness Company. However, Philips maintains that his allegations against Himalaya Wellness Company are "fully science-backed and evidence-backed" and that all the analysis which he had done are available for public review. As of May 2025, his X account is active.

In 2025, Philips received the Ockham award from the UK magazine The Skeptic. Editor Michael Marshall said at the time of the award about the important task to protect the public, "Dr Philips has continued that work, even as alternative medicine companies with deep pockets and powerful political connections have tried to silence him."

== Personal life ==
He is the son of Padma Shri recipient, Philip Augustine.
