= Himalaya Wellness Company =

Indian multinational pharmaceutical company

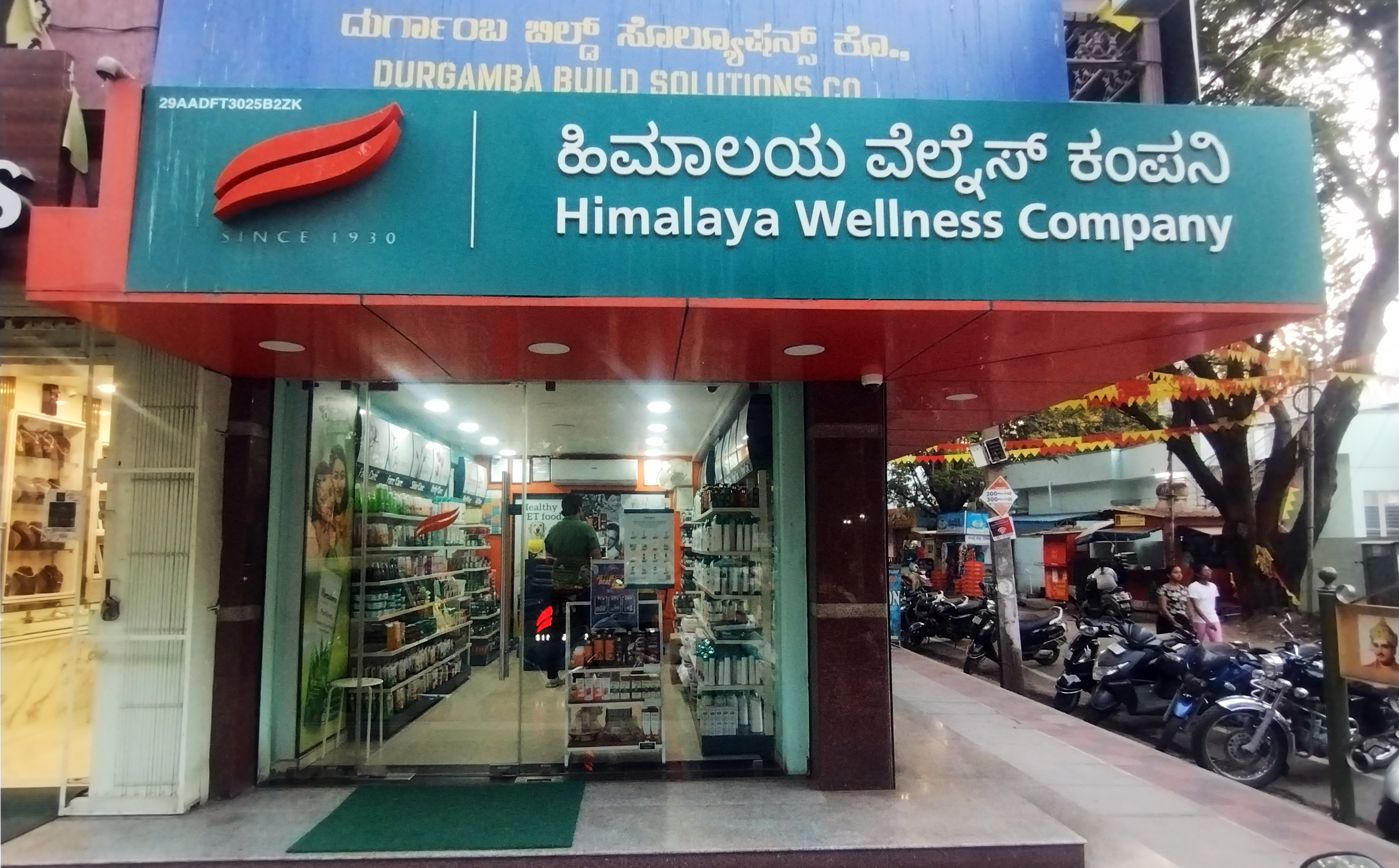
- Himalaya Wellness store at RR Nagar, Bangalore (2026)
- Formerly: Himalaya Drug Company
- Type: Private
- Industry: Pharmaceuticals; Consumer goods
- Founded: 1930; 96 years ago
- Founder: Mohammad Manal
- Headquarters: Bangalore, Karnataka, India
- Area served: Worldwide
- Key people: Shailendra Malhothra (Global CEO); Jatin Brahmecha (Global CFO)
- Products: Personal care; Herbal medicine; Ayurvedic medicine; Nutraceutical; Cleaning agent; Animal care
- Revenue: ▲₹37.6 billion (US$400 million) (FY22)
- Number of employees: 10,000
- Parent: Himalaya Global Holdings Ltd.
- Website: www.himalayawellness.com

Himalaya Wellness Company (formerly Himalaya Drug Company) is an Indian multinational personal care and pharmaceutical company based in Bangalore, India. It was originally established by Muhammad Manal in Dehradun in 1930. It produces health care products containing Ayurvedic ingredients, under the name Himalaya Herbal Healthcare. Its operations are spread across India, the United States, the Middle East, Asia, Europe and Oceania, while its products are sold in 106 countries across the world. Its flagship product is a hepatic drug named Liv.52, first introduced in 1955.

Himalaya Global Holdings (HGH), headquartered in the Cayman Islands, is the parent company of Himalaya Wellness Company and the global holding company of the group. Apart from Bangalore, HGH has regional head offices in Dubai, Singapore and Houston.

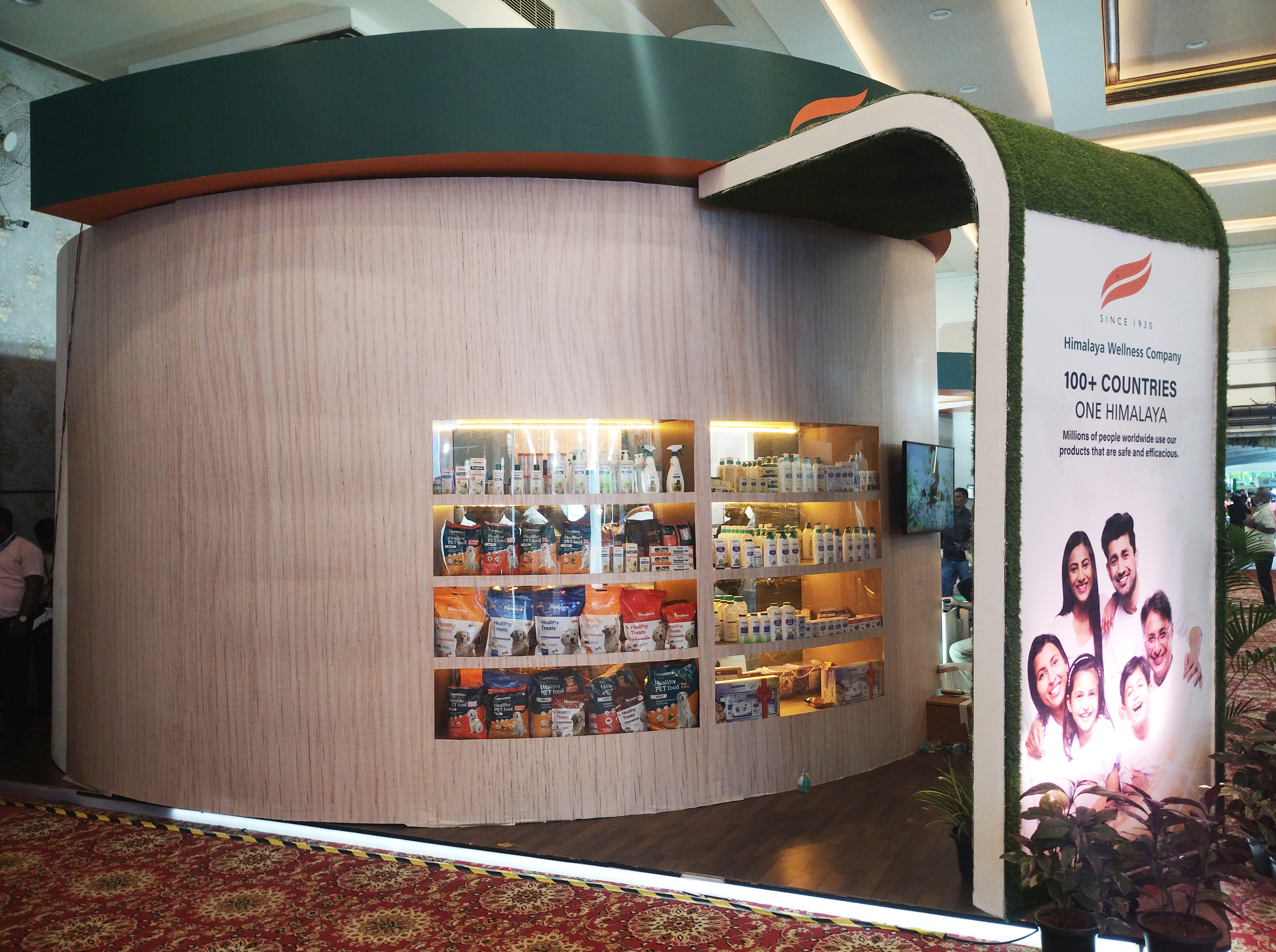
Himalaya Wellness Company at 2nd Ayurveda World Summit, Bangalore (2025)

== History ==
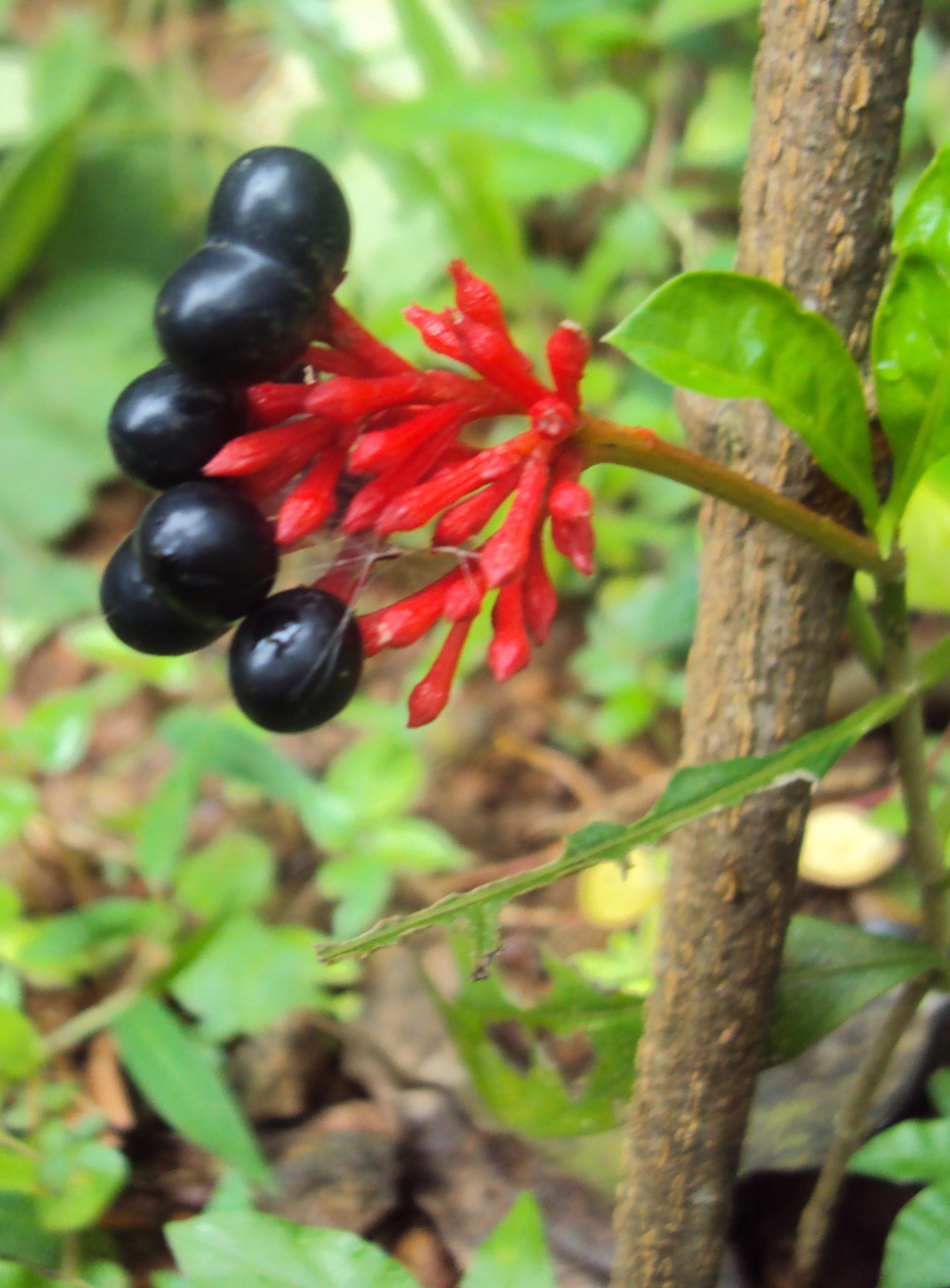
Rauwolfia serpentina

The Himalaya Drug Company was founded in Dehradun in the 1930s by Mohammad Manal. A self-professed "lover of nature", Manal had the goal of commercialising Ayurvedic and herbal products to suit contemporary needs, by focusing on modern empirical research to demonstrate their efficacy.

The company moved to Bombay (Mumbai) in the 1950s. In 1955, it launched 'Liv.52', a hepato-protective, that became the flagship product of the company.

In 1975, Meraj Manal, Mohammad Manal's son, started a manufacturing unit in Bangalore, which helped the company grow its manufacturing capacity as well as to globalise.

== Global markets ==
In 1996, the company entered the US market following the introduction of the Dietary Supplement Health and Education Act of 1994. The company then expanded into other countries.

As of 2015, the company sold its products in 91 countries with about 50% of its revenue from outside India. The company has a presence in 106 countries.

== Products ==
Himalaya Herbal Healthcare has a very wide range of products, which include "pharmaceuticals, personal care, baby care, well-being, nutrition and animal health products.". The company has more than 290 researchers that utilise Ayurvedic herbs and minerals. Also, Himalaya Neem face wash brand is reportedly the second biggest in India. Mothercare products were launched in 2016.

== Controversies ==
In September 2023, Himalaya Wellness, represented by Udaya Holla of Holla & Holla, obtained an ex parte injunction order against Cyriac Abby Philips, who is known for sharing his critical views on alternative medicine on social media. The advocates alleged that Philips' social media posts had negatively affected the profits of Himalaya Wellness and that he was being funded by modern medicine companies. The injunction issued by a Bangalore civil court required Twitter to restrict access to Philips' account, which was consequently withheld in India. The court order also prohibited Philips from sharing any negative content about Himalaya Wellness. Legal experts criticized the order as disproportionate, pointing out that ex parte injunctions are reserved for truly exceptional circumstances where informing the defendant would lead to significant and irreparable harm to the plaintiff, and a tweet does not qualify as such. Philips maintained that his claims against the Himalaya Wellness Company's products, like Liv. 52, were backed by scientific evidence. In October 2023, the Karnataka High Court ordered reinstatement of Philips' Twitter account after he deleted his nine tweets about Himalaya Wellness.
