= Anil Kumar Mandal =

Indian Bengali ophthalmologist (born 1958)

- Born: 2 January 1958 (age 68); Ghanashyambati South 24 Parganas, West Bengal, India
- Education: Nil Ratan Sircar Medical College; University of Calcutta; AIIMS Delhi
- Known for: Studies on Glaucoma
- Spouse: Dr. Vijaya Kumari Gothwal (Mandal)
- Awards: 2003 Shanti Swarup Bhatnagar Prize; 2000 ICMR Medical Research Prize; 2000 AAO Achievement Award; 2003 AIOS Col. Rangachari Award
- Scientific career
- Fields: Ophthalmology
- Workplaces: L. V. Prasad Eye Institute; Kellogg Eye Centre; Doheny Eye Institute

Anil Kumar Mandal is an Indian ophthalmologist and a consultant at L. V. Prasad Eye Institute, Hyderabad. Known for his research on glaucoma, Mandal is an elected fellow of the National Academy of Medical Sciences. The Council of Scientific and Industrial Research, the apex agency of the Government of India for scientific research, awarded him the Shanti Swarup Bhatnagar Prize for Science and Technology, one of the highest Indian science awards, for his contributions to Medical Sciences in 2003. (Note: Long link - please select award year to see details)

== Biography ==
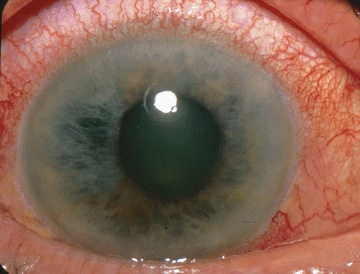
Acute angle closure glaucoma

Anil K. Mandal was born in a village named Ghanashyambati, South 24 Parganas district in the Indian state of West Bengal to Jayalaxmi and Manik Chandra Mandal.He did his primary education in Parvati FP School under guidance of his father who was Headmaster of the same school. His secondary education was in Bawali Higher Secondary School. He graduated in medicine in 1981 from Nil Ratan Sircar Medical College and Hospital of the University of Calcutta and moved to Dr R.P. Centre for Ophthalmic Sciences of the All India Institute of Medical Sciences, Delhi from where he secured an MD in 1986. Subsequently, he did his senior residency at Dr. R. P. Centre itself and earned a Diplomate of National Board from the National Board of Examinations in 1987. Later, he joined L. V. Prasad Eye Institute, Hyderabad where he is a consultant specializing in cataract, glaucoma and pediatric ophthalmology. In between, he had two sabbaticals as a visiting research fellow at Kellogg Eye Centre, Michigan, and Doheny Eye Institute. He also serves as a faculty of the Indian Association of Community Ophthalmology (INACO).

Mandal has done extensive studies on glaucoma and is credited with the development of an alternative surgical protocol for treating pediatric glaucoma. He developed an integrated approach for treating glaucoma which incorporated choosing the right surgical method, preservation of residual vision, studying genetic aspects and imparting genetic counselling. His studies assisted in widening the understanding of glaucoma, particularly developmental glaucoma and pediatric glaucoma. His studies have been documented by way of over 75 articles (Note: Please see Selected bibliography section) and he also serves as a reviewer for the Indian Journal of Ophthalmology.

The Council of Scientific and Industrial Research awarded him Shanti Swarup Bhatnagar Prize, one of the highest Indian science awards in 2003, making him the first ophthalmologist to receive the honor. The National Academy of Medical Sciences elected him as a fellow in 2009. He is also a recipient of the Medical Research Prize of the Indian Council of Medical Research (2000 ), Achievement Award of American Academy of Ophthalmology (2000) and Col. Rangachari Award of All India Ophthalmological Society (2003) and the award orations delivered by him include the 1977 Dr. P. Siva Reddy Gold Medal Oration of All India Ophthalmological Society.

== Selected bibliography ==
- Anil K Mandal (1993). "Current concepts in the diagnosis and management of developmental glaucomas". Current Ophthalmology. 41 (2): 51–70.
- Mandal AK, Netland PA (2004). "Glaucoma in aphakia and pseudophakia after congenital cataract surgery". Indian J Ophthalmol. 52 (3): 185–98. PMID 15510457.
- Kaur K, Mandal AK, Chakrabarti S (2011). "Primary Congenital Glaucoma and the Involvement of CYP1B1". Middle East Afr J Ophthalmol. 18 (1): 7–16. doi:10.4103/0974-9233.75878. PMC 3085158. PMID 21572728.
- Anil K Mandal; Debasis Chakrabarti (2011). "Update on congenital glaucoma". Indian J Ophthalmol. 59 (Suppl1): S148–S157. doi:10.4103/0301-4738.73683. PMC 3038500. PMID 21150027.
- Hiebert Linda M.; Han Juying & Mandal Anil Kumar (2014). "Glycosaminoglycans, Hyperglycemia, and Disease". Antioxidants & Redox Signaling. 21 (7): 1032–43. doi:10.1089/ars.2013.5695. PMID 24224492.
- Pathania D, Senthil S, Rao HL, Mandal AK, Garudadari CS (2014). "Outcomes of trabeculectomy in juvenile open angle glaucoma". Indian J Ophthalmol. 62 (2): 224–8. doi:10.4103/0301-4738.101074. PMC 4005241. PMID 23571250.
- Bhupesh Singh; Ashik Mohamed; Sunita Chaurasia; Muralidhar Ramappa; Anil Kumar Mandal; Subhadra Jalali; Virender S. Sangwan (2014). "Clinical Manifestations of Congenital Aniridia". Journal of Pediatric Ophthalmology & Strabismus. 51 (1): 59–62. doi:10.3928/01913913-20131223-01. PMID 24369682.

== See also ==
- Aniridia
- Trabeculectomy
- Buphthalmos
- Aphakia
- Dr.Jagat Ram
