= Mary Vance Humphrey =

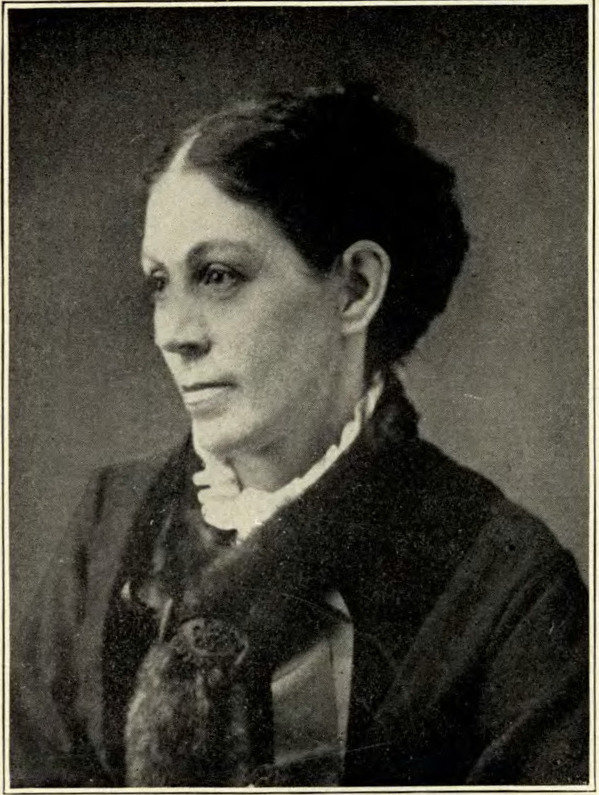
- Born: Mary Anne Vance; February 14, 1838; Springfield, Ohio, U.S.
- Died: June 27, 1916 (aged 78); Los Angeles, California, U.S.
- Education: Wesleyan College
- Occupations: writer, clubwoman
- Spouse: James Humphrey (m. 1861)
- Children: 5
- Writing career
- Notable work: The Squatter Sovereign
- Literary movement: Women's club movement in the United States

Mary Vance Humphrey (née Vance; pen name, Mary A. Humphrey; 1838–1916) was a writer and leader in the women's club movement in the United States. She was very active in educational, literary and club circles, serving as president of the Kansas State Federation of Women's Clubs and the Woman's Kansas Day Club. Of her record as an official, Margaret Hill McCarter wrote: "She stands for patriotism, progress and peace." Humphrey was the author of poems, short stories and articles on civic welfare, which were published in magazines and newspapers. Her one novel was the "Squatter Sovereign," a tale of the settlement of Kansas in the territorial days. Later, as she had more time from her family, she became active in club life; in fact, was one of the prime movers in the organization of women's clubs. She was the founder of the Junction City Reading Club, and one of the founders of the Social Science Club, the state-wide organization which preceded the State Federation. She was a believer in woman's right to vote, and warmly espoused the cause. In her church, she was the same power for advancement and for the common good that she was in secular affairs. Education had her particular interest, and she served many times on the school board.

== Early life and education ==
Mary Anne Vance was born in Springfield, Ohio, February 14, 1838. Her parents were John and Eleanor (Donaldson) Vance. She removed with her parents to Cincinnati, Ohio when a child.

She was educated in Cincinnati, at the Wesleyan College. There, she had been an active member in the literary society.

== Career ==
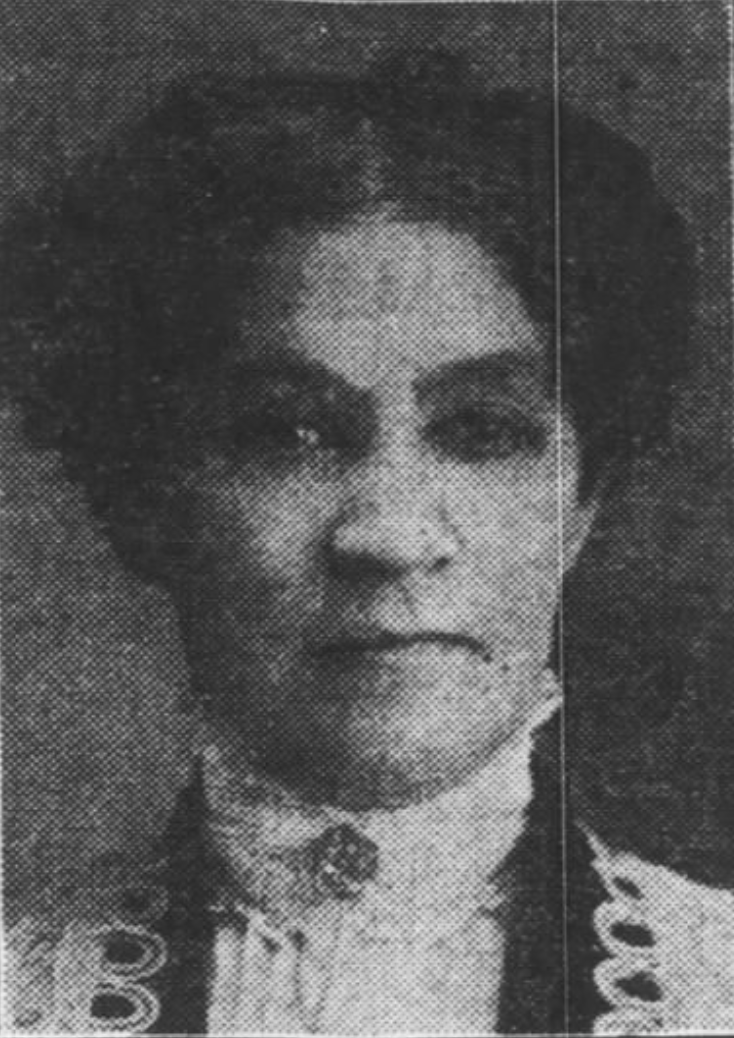
Humphrey in 1915

In 1861, Miss Vance came out to Kansas, stopping at Manhattan where she had intimate friends. There she met James Humphrey, a young Englishman, who had settled in Manhattan in 1857. October 23, 1861, in Topeka, Kansas, they were married and took up their residence in Manhattan, where Mr. Humphrey was serving a term as county treasurer. They shared the experiences common to pioneers. Mr. Humphrey was a man of many interests, and his wife had her part in every one of them, and together they were involved in the social and political life of their time.

In the late 1860s, Elizabeth Cady Stanton and Susan B. Anthony had preached suffrage in Kansas, and Humphreys had entertained and encouraged them.

In Junction City, Kansas, she helped form the Kansas State Social Science Club, 1880. She founded the Reading Club of Junction City, 1875. She served as president of the Kansas State Federation of Women's Clubs, 1900–01; director, General Federation of Women's Clubs, 1902–04; and chair, Press Committee, Fifth District. She helped found the Woman's Kansas Day Club, a patriotic organization, serving as president in 1907.

Her work as member of the Board of Education did much for Junction City and her interest in libraries did equally as much for the State of Kansas.

Humphrey wrote a number of poems. Her work in later years was only prose. She was the author of The Squatter Sovereign, or Kansas in the Fifties, a historical novel of pioneer days. She also wrote a series of short stories on the property rights of women in Kansas: "King Lear in Kansas" and "The Legal Status of Mrs. O'Rourke". While serving as the organization's president, she published a booklet entitled "The History of the Woman's Kansas Day Club".

She was a member of the Purity League, Reading Club, Authors' Club (Topeka, Kansas), Kansas Woman's Press Club, Woman's Kansas Day Club, and the Equal Suffrage Club, as well as a life member of the Kansas State Historical Society.

== Personal life ==
The Humphreys had several children: Herbert (died 1890), James Vance, Spencer (died 1895), Eleanor, and Adele.

The Humphreys lived at Manhattan until May 1, 1870, when they moved to Junction City, and that city remained their home with the exception of three years, from 1896 to 1899, spent in Sedalia, Missouri. When Judge Humphrey was appointed a member of the State Tax Commission, in 1907, the Humphrey family took up their residence in Topeka, but this was to be a very temporary one, for he died on September 19, and Mrs. Humphrey returned to Junction City. After Judge Humphrey's death Mrs. Humphrey spent considerable time with her two daughters on the Pacific coast.

In religion, she was a Universalist. She favored woman suffrage.

== Death and legacy ==
She moved to Los Angeles, California, in 1915 to live with her daughters, and died in that city on June 27, 1916.

In February 1917, Humphrey's friends in Junction City established a scholarship fund of the Kansas State Federation of Women's Clubs in her name.

== Selected works ==
=== Novels ===
- The Squatter Sovereign, or Kansas in the Fifties, a historical novel of pioneer days (1883) (text, via Internet Archive)

=== Booklets ===
- "The History of the Woman's Kansas Day Club"

=== Stories ===
- "King Lear in Kansas"
- "The Legal Status of Mrs. O'Rourke"
