= Ratan Chandra Kar =

Indian doctor

Ratan Chandra Kar is an Indian physician and health official who worked in Andaman and Nicobar. He is known for helping the Jarawas (Andaman Islands) from disease outbreaks, such as measles in 1998.

== Life and career ==
Ratan Chandra Kar was born in Ghatal. He is a general physician and is the author of the book The Jarawas of the Andamans. He is an alumnus of Nil Ratan Sircar Medical College and Hospital.

He worked with the remote indigenous people, learning their language and gaining their trust, from 1998 to 2003. As the local medical official, he worked out of a thatched hut which served as the primary health centre. He then went to work in Port Blair in 2003, but continued his visits to the Jarawas. In 2006, he became the deputy director (tribal and welfare) of the Andaman and Nicobar administration. From 2012 to 2013, he was posted at Neil Island. Following his 2014 retirement, he continued to work locally, and then returned with his family to Bangalore.

In 2023, he was awarded the Padma Shri. Locally, he was known as Jarawa Doctor.
