= Victoria Jubilee Hospital for Women =

Hospital in Gujarat, India

- Victoria Jubilee Hospital Trust

Geography
- Location: 23.02581191°N 72.59904945°E, Gujarat, India

History
- Founded: 1889

Links
- Lists: Hospitals in India

The Victoria Jubilee Hospital for Women is a hospital in Ahmedabad, Gujarat, India.

== History ==
The hospital was established by the Indian industrialist Ranchhodlal Chhotalal in 1889 as a tribute to Queen Victoria’s Golden Jubilee. Motibai Kapadia was its first chief medical officer, who held the post for 30 years.
