= Philip Augustine =

Indian gastroenterologist

- Born: Pallikkara, Ernakulam, Kerala, India
- Occupation: Gastroenterologist
- Children: 4, including Dr.Cyriac Abby Philips
- Awards: Padma Shri
- Website: www.paa.org.in

Philip Augustine is an Indian gastroenterologist, specialist in gastrointestinal endoscopy and a hospital administrator from Ernakulam, Kerala. He founded the Lakeshore Hospital and Research Centre in 2003. In 2010, the Government of India honoured him with the Padma Shri, for his services to the fields of medicine.

== Biography ==
Philip Augustine was born in Kaduthuruthy, Kerala. Choosing medical profession, he secured his MD from the All India Institute of Medical Sciences, in 1975, with a Gold Medal.

Augustine started his professional career at a clinic in the town of Koothattukulam. Later, he specialised in Gastroenterology and had training in ultrasonography and endoscopy at various institutions.

In 1996, Augustine launched the work on the Lakeshore Hospital and Research Centre. The hospital was opened in 2003.

Augustine is married, has four children and presently lives in Palarivattom, Kochi, Kerala.

== Legacy ==
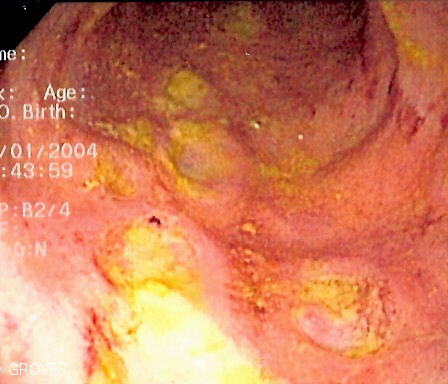
Endoscopic image of Crohn's colitis showing deep ulceration

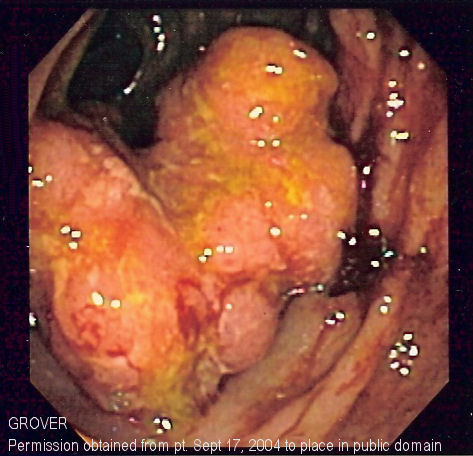
Endoscopic image of colon cancer identified in the sigmoid colon on screening colonoscopy for Crohn's disease

The primary contribution of Augustine is the hospital he found in 1996, along with a bunch of doctors and businessmen, the Lakeshore Hospital and Research Centre, which became operational in 2003. The hospital, has, over the years, grown to become one of the leading multi speciality health care centres in Kerala and is stated to have several firsts to its credit. The hospital is certified by the National Accreditation Board for Hospitals and Healthcare providers.

- First living donor liver transplant in Kerala
- First insulin pump insertion surgery in South India
- First metal on ceramic knee replacement surgery in Asia
- First Spyglass Cholangioscopy and pancreatoscopy in Kerala
- First to introduce double balloon enteroscopy in Kerala
- First to introduce wireless capsule endoscopy in Kerala
- First peripheral stem cell transplantation in Kerala
- Third centre in the world to perform key hole surgical transplantation of kidney

Besides, Augustine is credited as the first to report on Crohn's disease in the country in 1995, which he submitted at the national conference of the Indian Society of Gastroenterology. He also led a team of doctors who first reported Recurrent Pyogenic Cholangites or Oriental Cholangiopathy in India.

== Positions ==
- Chairman – Healthcare sub-committee of the Confederation of Indian Industry (CII) – Kerala Chapter

== Publications ==
Augustine has published a book on bowel diseases which serves as a reference book on the subject. He has also published several scientific journals and has contributed chapters on pancreasis in medical text books.

== Controversy ==
In 2023, Dr. Philip Augustine, founder of Lakeshore Hospital in Kochi, was named among the accused in a case concerning the alleged illegal transplantation of organs from an 18-year-old accident victim in 2009. According to court proceedings, he had signed the brain stem death certificate, and the Ernakulam Judicial First Class Magistrate Court found sufficient grounds to initiate a trial under provisions of the Transplantation of Human Organs Act, 1994.

== See also ==
- Gastroenterology
- Crohn's disease
- Endoscopy
