= Cincinnati Female Seminary =

Seminary in Cincinnati, Ohio

Coordinates: 39°06′07″N 84°31′28″W

The Cincinnati Female Seminary was a seminary in Cincinnati, Ohio. The seminary was located at the southwest corner of W Seventh and Mound Streets. In 1843, Margaret Coxe founded the Cincinnati Female Seminary. In 1850, John Zachos, became Coxe's co-owner and its principal. The school had ten teachers, with a 1 to 12 ratio of teachers to students. (It is also reported that the school started as a private seminary c. 1849 and run by T. A. Burrowes. By the fifth year there were 136 pupils.)

Funds were raised in 1854 for a public seminary of the same name, with a target of $35,000. The board of trustees was interdenominational. The inaugural principal was to be Burrowes. "By an arrangement entered into by the proprietors of the Cincinnati Female Seminary and the Mount Auburn Young Ladies’ Institute, the former was transferred to Mount Auburn, and the two schools consolidated into one in September, 1861."

== Notable alumni ==
- Susan Fessenden, (1840–1932), temperance activist
- Mary Vance Humphrey (1838-1916), writer, clubwoman

== Notable staff ==
- Rachel Littler Bodley, teacher of natural sciences (1862–5)
