= Kedarnath Das =

Indian obstetrician (1867–1936)

Sir Kedarnath Das
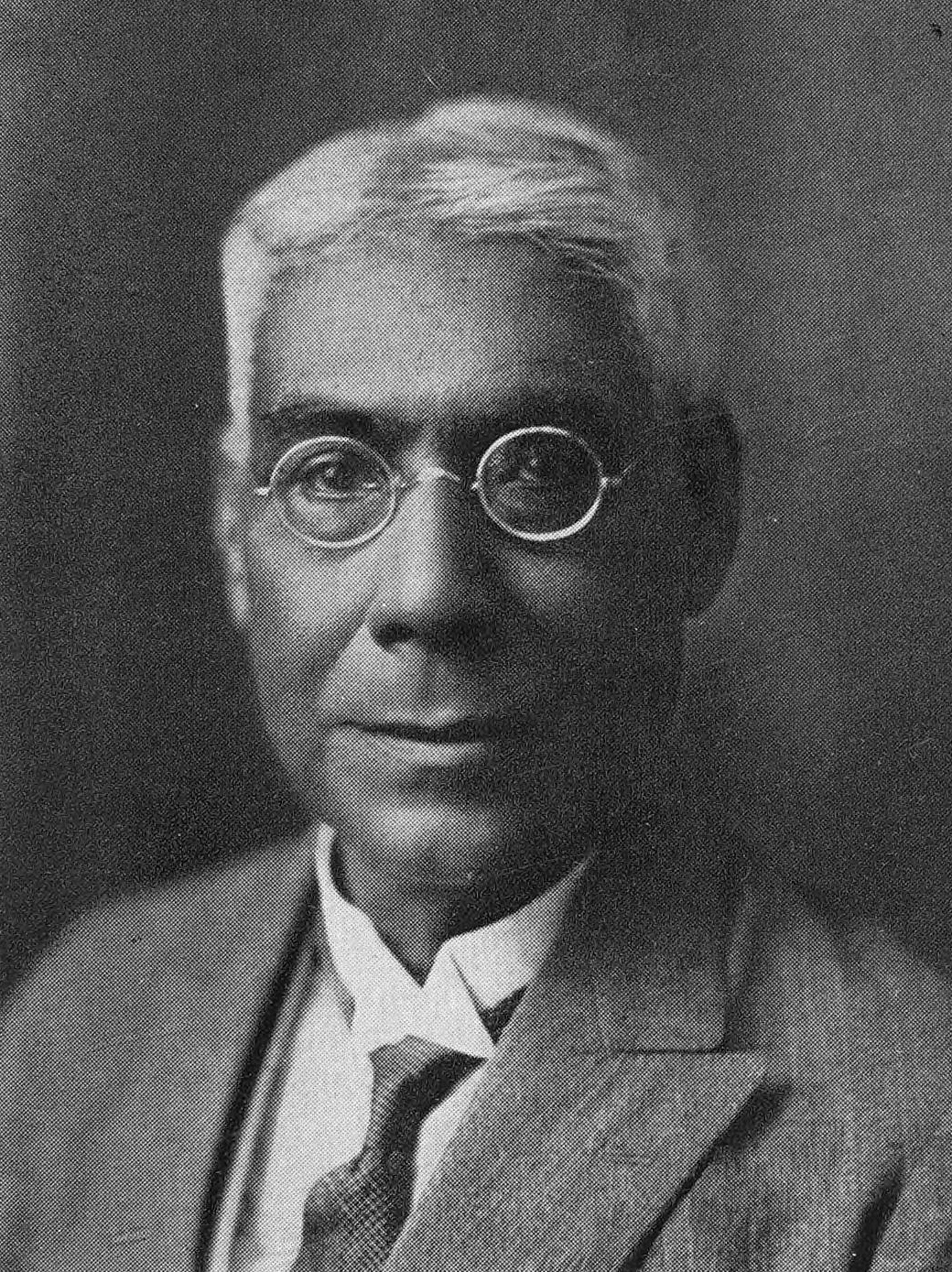
- Born: Kedarnath Das; 24 February 1867
- Died: 13 March 1936 (aged 69); Calcutta
- Education: Calcutta Medical College
- Title: Sir Kedarnath Das
- Scientific career
- Fields: Obstetrics

Sir Kedarnath Das CIE, MD (1867–1936) was a prominent obstetrician and medical educator of India from Calcutta.

== Education ==
Kedarnath Das was educated at Scottish Church College, Calcutta. He graduated in medicine in 1892 from Calcutta Medical College. He earned his MD in gynaecology and obstetrics from Madras University in 1895.

== Career ==
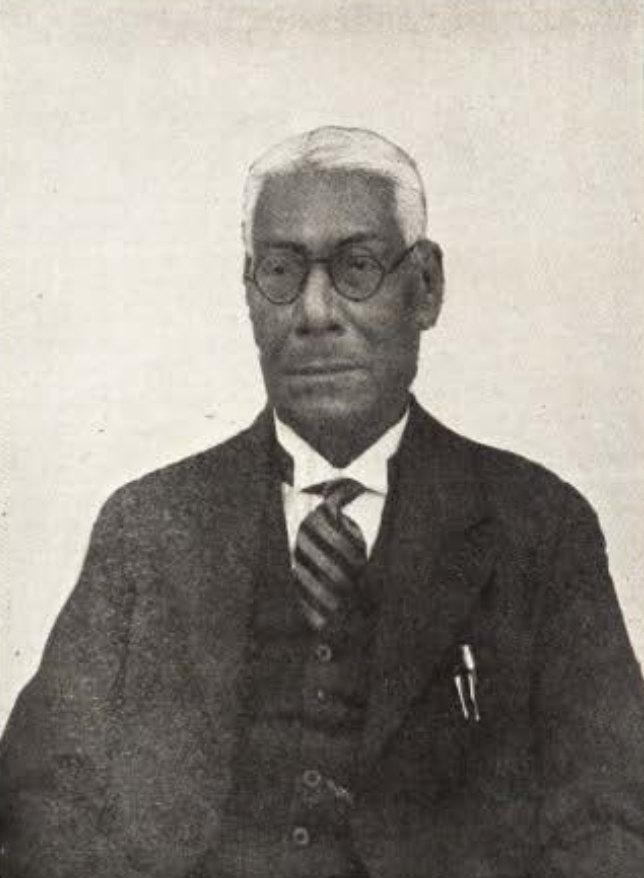

Kedarnath started his career as a registrar at Calcutta Medical College. Then he was appointed as a teacher in midwifery in Campbell Medical School in 1899. He joined Carmichael Medical College and became the head of department of Gynaecology and Obstetrics in 1919. He remained as the principal of Carmichael Medical College from 1922 till his death in 1936. He served as dean of the Faculty of Medicine at Calcutta University and was a member of the Bengal council of Medical Registration and the governing body of the State Medical Faculty of Bengal. He became a member of the British Medical Association in 1901, serving as vice-president of its Calcutta branch from 1928 to 1930 and as president from 1931 to 1934.

== Publications ==
Journal articles published in the Indian Medical Gazette and international medical journals include material on brain tumours, diabetes, and tetanus. Books include A Handbook of Obstetrics (1914) and A Textbook of Midwifery (1920).

His most important work is the 900-page Obstetric Forceps: Its History and Evolution (1928), which he researched by touring Europe and America and collecting obstetric forceps of various kinds.

== Long curved obstetric forceps ==
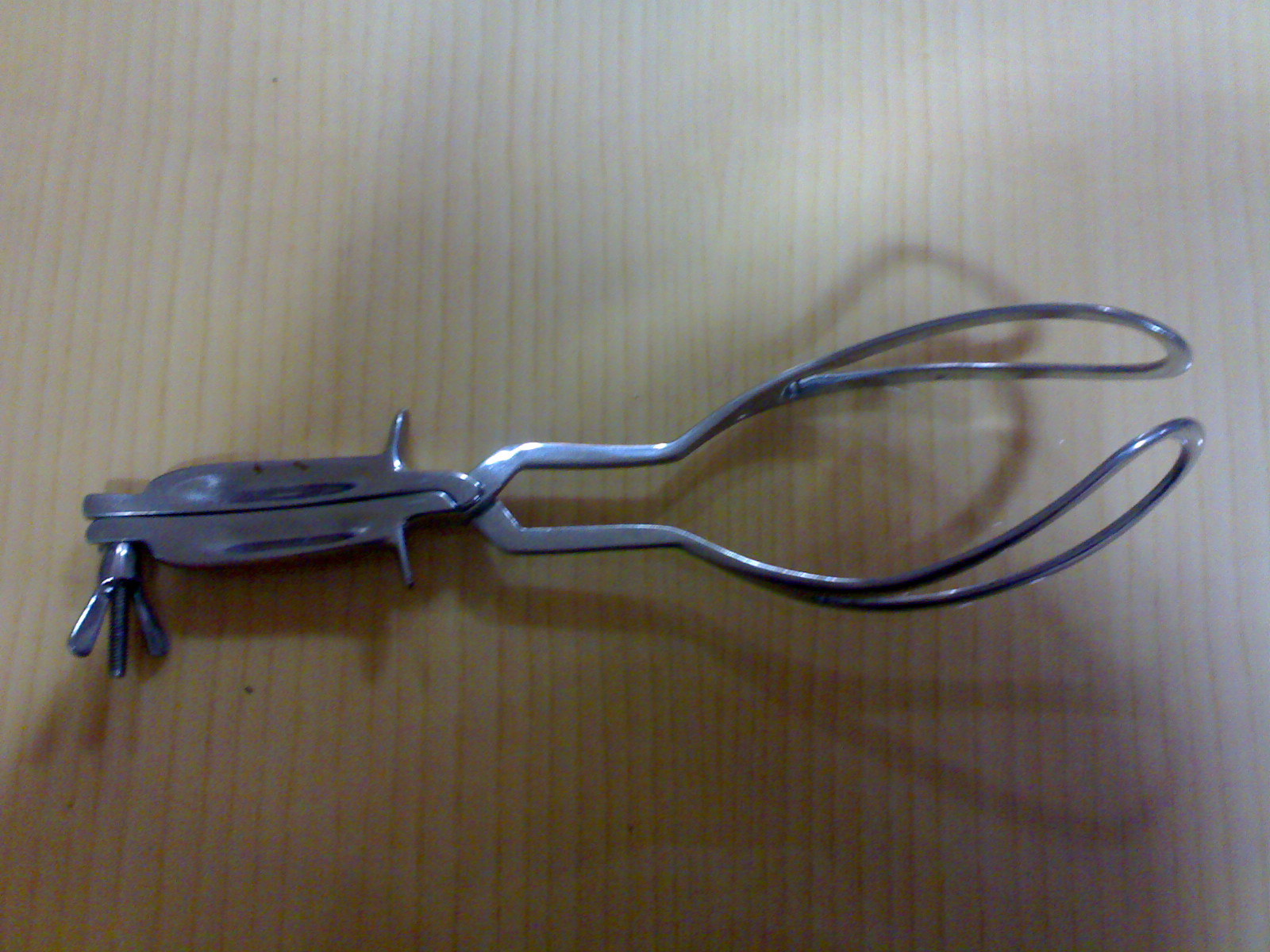
Das's modified long curved obstetric forceps

Das designed a lighter and shorter variety of long curved obstetric forceps for use in the delivery of babies of Indian women, who typically have a smaller pelvis and babies with a lower birth weight.

== Awards and honours ==
He was named an Honorary Fellow of the American Gynaecological Society and the American Associations of Obstetricians, Gynaecologists and Abdominal Surgeons. He was a foundation fellow of British College of Obstetricians and Gynaecologists. He received the Companion of the Order of the Indian Empire in 1918 and was knighted in June 1933.

== See also ==
- Instruments used in obstetrics and gynecology
- Forceps in childbirth
