= Charles Sargent (judge) =

4th Chief Justice of the Bombay High Court

Sir Charles Sargent
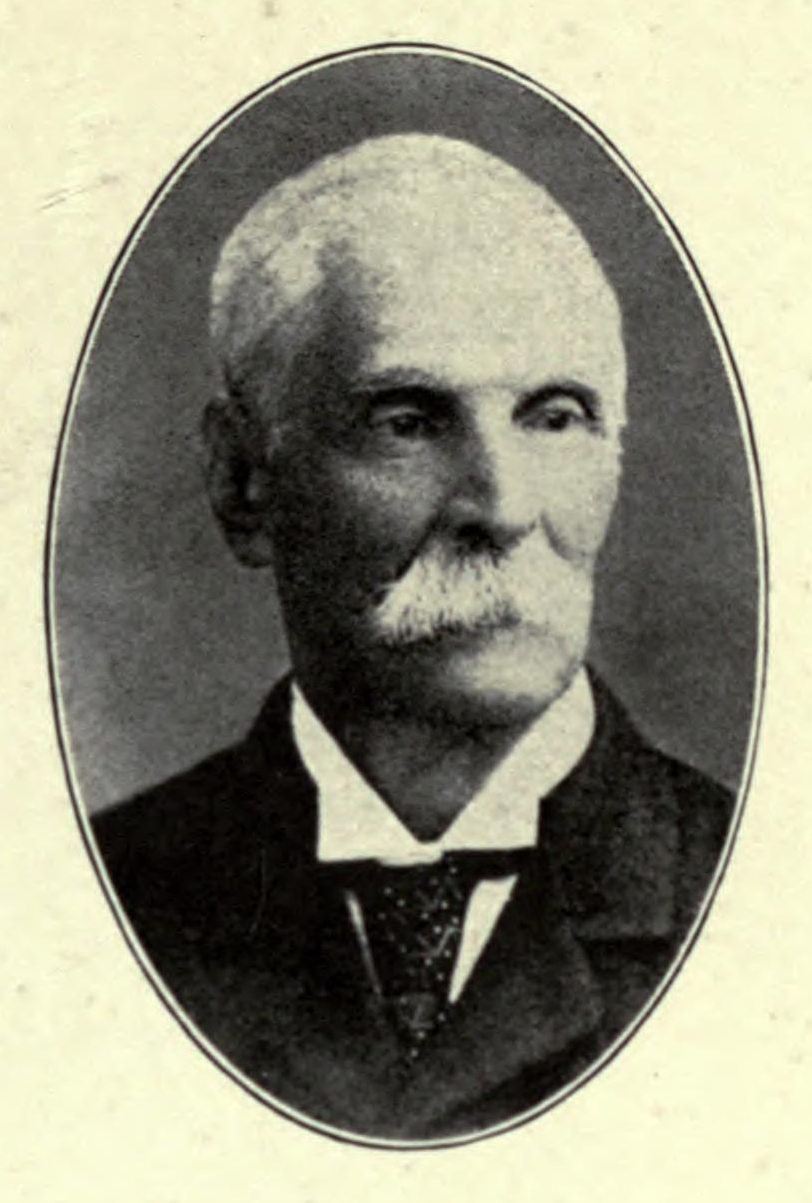

4th Chief Justice of Bombay High Court
- In office 9 August 1882 – 19 June 1895
- Appointed by: Queen Victoria
- Preceded by: Michael Roberts Westropp
- Succeeded by: Charles Frederick Farran

Judge of Bombay High Court
- In office 3 March 1866 – 8 August 1882
- Appointed by: Queen Victoria

Personal details
- Born: 1821
- Died: 21 June 1900 (aged 78–79)
- Education: Trinity College, Cambridge
- Occupation: Lawyer, Judge
- Profession: Chief Justice

Sir Charles Sargent (1821 – 21 June 1900) was the 4th Chief Justice of the Bombay High Court in British India.

== Early life ==
Sargent completed his education at Trinity College, Cambridge where he took his M.A. and achieved the distinction of being Fifth Wrangler. He was called to the Bar at Lincoln's Inn in 1848.

== Career ==
Before coming to India Sargent was a member of Supreme Council of Justice of the Ionian Islands and also its Chief Justice for six years. He joined in the Bombay High Court on 3 March 1866 as Puisne Judge and after the retirement of Michael Roberts Westropp he became the Chief Justice in 1882. His judgments were generally short, lucid and free from political or racial bias. He served there up to 1895.
