= Amrita Shah =

Indian journalist and scholar

- Occupations: Journalist; writer

Academic background
- Education: Elphinstone College

Amrita Shah is an Indian journalist, scholar and writer. She was the first female editor of the men's magazine Debonair, and a founding editor of the Indian edition of Elle. Her work includes a series of articles on Mumbai's organised crime, a biography of the father of the Indian space program Vikram Sarabhai, a study of India's emerging politics through an urban framing in a contemporary history of the city of Ahmedabad, and a book on the impact of television in India.

Her major works have been supported by several awarded fellowships, including from the New India Foundation, Fulbright, the Nantes Institute for Advanced Study, the Homi Bhabha Fellowships Council, and the Institute for Public Knowledge at New York University.

Shah has been Contributing Editor with the Indian Express, a correspondent for Mumbai's Imprint Magazine and a Stringer for Time-Life.

== Career ==
Amrita Shah graduated in 1983 in English literature from Elphinstone College, Mumbai. She subsequently became a Stringer for the American Time magazine, and authored a series of articles on Mumbai's organised crime in the Illustrated Weekly of India and other publications.

She was the editor of the men's magazine Debonair at the time of the sensational campaign launching KamaSutra condoms in 1991; the magazine sold out in just a few days. According to Shah, the rush to buy the issue was entirely due to the images in the adverts. Unusual for its time, she was the magazine's first female editor. In 1996 she became the founding editor of Elle.

From 1999 to 2009 Shah was a Contributing Editor and Columnist with the Indian Express. She has also worked for Mumbai's Imprint Magazine. Stephen H. Hess noted that journalists like Shah objected to Americentrism in publishing and aspired to writing about a wider range of topics, with an aim to reach larger audiences. Referring to Orientalist expectations in the Western media, Shah writes that stories on burning brides and stampeding elephants were the kind of stories routinely expected of Indian contributors by the Western media.

=== Fellowships ===
In 2008 she held a fellowship with the New India Foundation, working on her book about the Indian city of Ahmedabad. Continuing with research on the city and global urbanism, in 2009 she was a Fulbright-Nehru Doctoral and Professional Research fellow. From January to April 2018 she was a writing fellow at the Johannesburg Institute for Advanced Study. In 2019, she was listed as resident fellow at The Nantes Institute for Advanced Study, continuing her work on a project titled "A Personal Journey Into History", in which she roams through Britain's Indian Ocean Empire following the trail of her great-grandfather Mohanlal who travelled to Natal at the turn of the twentieth century. She has previously received fellowships from the Homi Bhabha Fellowships Council, the Indian Culture Ministry (2012), the Indian Council for Historical Research (2013), the Stimson Center in Washington DC and the Institute for Public Knowledge at New York University.

== Works ==
=== Hype, Hypocrisy, and Television in Urban India ===
Shah's book Hype, Hypocrisy, and Television in Urban India was published in 1997. It was a survey of the socio-cultural and political landscape of post liberalisation India and contained significant findings including on the expansion of the media, on the dramatic transformation in the lives of Indian women, and on the future of journalism. While researching the book she became interested in Vikram Sarabhai, the father of the Indian Space Program and a key proponent of television in India, and his city of birth, Ahmedabad.

=== Vikram Sarabhai: A Life ===
She subsequently authored a biography of Vikram Sarabhai, titled Vikram Sarabhai: A Life, published in 2007. In it she wrote that Sarabhai "dreamed of using space technology for applications in agriculture, forestry, oceanography, geology, mineral prospecting and cartography, with a strict focus on peaceful ends". She included relationship difficulties with his wife, Mrinalini Sarabhai. Space historian Asif Azam Siddiqi called the work a "thoughtful examination of his life". In Robert S. Anderson's Nucleus and Nation: Scientists, International Networks, and Power in India, a footnote credits the biography for being one of the best about an Indian scientist.

=== Ahmedabad: A City in the World ===
Her book Ahmedabad: A City in the World was published in 2015, and described an emerging national politics through a city developmental frame. Shah details the emergence of a bleak Muslim ghetto, called Bombay Hotel, following Miraj, who lost his home in the attack on the Gulbarg Society. Shah writes that "all signs of life [at Gulbarg].. have been stamped out". The book is described as well written in Thomas Blom Hansen's Saffron Republic: Hindu Nationalism and State Power in India. In 2016, Ahmedabad was shortlisted for the Raymond-Crossword Book Award. In 2017 SAGE awarded Shah the Tejeshwar Singh Memorial Award.

=== Telly-Guillotined: How Television Changed India ===
Shah's book Telly-Guillotined: How Television Changed India, published in 2019, is a new, revised, and expanded version of Hype, Hypocrisy, and Television in Urban India (1997), continuing the story of television in India for an additional two decades.

== Selected publications ==
=== Articles ===
- "City of Gold". The Illustrated Weekly of India. January 1988.
- Shah, Amrita (25 April 2020). "The Man with Big Ears, and Big Dreams that Took India to the Moon" (PDF). Current Science. 118 (8): 1190. doi:10.18520/cs/v118/i8/1190. S2CID 202982653.

=== Books ===
- Balancing India's Human Resources: The Fine Line Between Success and Failure. Economist Intelligence Unit. 1996. ISBN 978-0-85058-862-0. (Co-author)
- Hype, Hypocrisy, and Television in Urban India. Vikas Publishing House. 1997. ISBN 978-81-259-0359-8.
- Vikram Sarabhai, a Life. Penguin. 2007. ISBN 978-0-670-99951-4.
- Ahmedabad: A City in the World. Bloomsbury USA. 2016. ISBN 978-93-84898-01-4.
- Telly-Guillotined: How Television Changed India. SAGE Publications. 2019. ISBN 978-93-5328-605-7.
