= Rachel Bodley =

US professor, botanist, and educator (1831–1888)

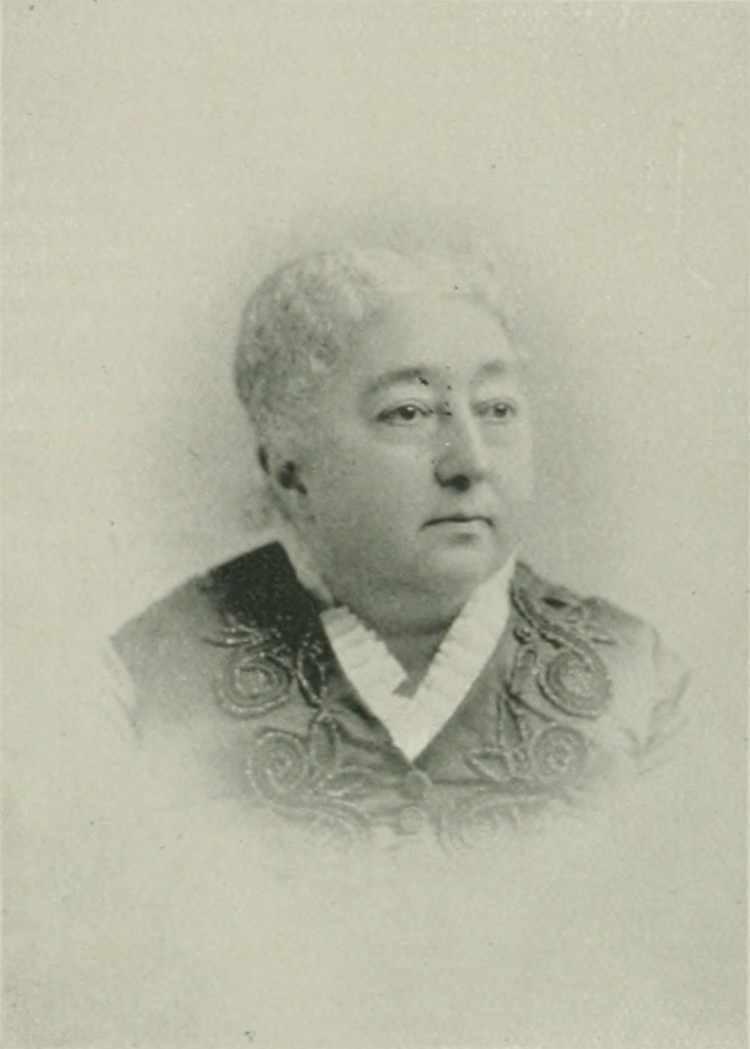
- "A Woman of the Century"
- Born: December 7, 1831; Cincinnati, Ohio
- Died: June 15, 1888 (age 56); Philadelphia, Pennsylvania
- Occupations: University dean, professor, and botanist

Rachel Littler Bodley (December 7, 1831 – June 15, 1888) was an American professor, botanist, and university leader. She was best known for her term as Dean of the Woman's Medical College of Pennsylvania (1874–1888). She helped found the American Chemical Society in New York City.

Bodley's main contribution to botany was Catalogue of Plants Contained in Herbarium of Joseph Clark, a report on an herbarium she personally organized and catalogued. She taught various subjects, primarily chemistry and medicine, the latter of which she developed toward a more science-focused method of study. Through her work The College Story, she compiled the first survey of the lives and successful careers of female medical students after graduating from medical college. She received numerous honors and maintained membership in many professional societies during her career.

== Life ==
=== Early life and education ===
Bodley was born December 7, 1831, in Cincinnati, Ohio. She was the eldest daughter of the Presbyterian carpenter and pattern maker Anthony Prichard Bodley, of Scotch-Irish descent, and teacher Rebecca Wilson Bodley (née Talbott), of English Quaker descent. Bodley was named after her maternal grandmother, Rachel Littler Talbott; she was raised Presbyterian, as were her two older brothers and two younger sisters. She completed her primary education by age 12 at the private school her mother ran. In 1844, she entered the Ohio Wesleyan Female College in Cincinnati, where she stood out for her work in the college's literary society. She graduated at age 18 in 1849.

=== Further education and early career ===
Bodley was hired as an assistant teacher at Wesleyan after her graduation and rose to the role of preceptress in the higher collegiate studies. Though she was lauded for her work at Wesleyan, she was not content with her achievements there and decided to pursue further education. In 1860, she began studying advanced chemistry and physics at the Polytechnic College of Pennsylvania, then the country's foremost institution of the applied sciences. During this time, she also studied practical anatomy and physiology at the Woman's Medical College of Pennsylvania in Philadelphia, which she would finish later in her career.

In 1862, Bodley returned to teaching as a professor of natural sciences at the Cincinnati Female Seminary. She made extensive effort in the organization and arrangement of an herbarium which had been donated to the Seminary by the heirs of Joseph Clark (1823–1858), a resident of Cincinnati. It was an extensive collection of local flora, and the guide to the collection which Bodley compiled, Catalogue of Plants Contained in Herbarium of Joseph Clark, printed in 1865, also served as a guide to plants for students and travelers in the Cincinnati area. Bodley assembled this work in her free time from 1862 to 1865. It was the first record of Ohio flora prepared by a woman and her most significant work in botany; her work was later congratulated by Asa Gray, the premier American botanist of the 18th century, as a "very satisfactory contribution to science". She later studied many strange plants including Venus flytrap, Lily of the valley, Snowdrops, dwarf hose chestnut, and Alpine sandwort. During her tenure at the Seminary, Bodley continued private study in higher mathematics, microscopy, phonography, elocution, music, French, German, and drawing.

=== Women's Medical College of Pennsylvania ===
In 1865, she left the Cincinnati Female Seminary to become the chair of chemistry and toxicology at the Woman's Medical College of Pennsylvania, where she would spend the rest of her career. She was the first woman to hold the title professor of chemistry at a medical school, the first female chemist on the faculty, and the first faculty member appointed from outside Philadelphia. Bodley brought a science-focused approach to teaching her students in medicine, emphasizing the science of medicine rather than the art of medicine. Bodley stressed attention to detail and use of facts, logic, and solid arguments to her students rather than intuition, "womanliness", and emotion, the latter of which was common in medical instruction at the time. In 1871, she was awarded an honorary Master of Arts degree from her alma mater, Wesleyan Female College, along with two other women. This was the first time the college had bestowed a degree past the Bachelor of Arts conferred upon all graduates.

Bodley was elected dean of the faculty in January 1874, where she remained until her death. Bodley reformed the curriculum by implementing progressive policies that increased the length of instruction to three years and allowed for more demonstrations and practical instruction in classes. She oversaw the construction of a surgical amphitheater and a surgical hall, which greatly expanded opportunities in clinical training. The Women's Medical College presented Rachel Bodley with an honorary M.D. degree in 1876, conferring upon her the title of "Doctor". For the valedictorian address of 1881, Bodley presented "The College Story", the results of a survey into the post-graduation lives of the 244 living alumnae of the Women's Medical College. It was one of the first studies of female medical graduates in America, for which Bodley approached the topic in the terms of a scientific experiment, seeking to use "the same method, applied to the subject of the medical education of women." The survey found that, of the 189 women who responded, 88% were still practicing medicine, with only 8 women citing "domestic duties" as their reason for leaving the medical practice. This helped to refute the claims of opponents of female medical education, who maintaintained that women would simply give up the practice once they married. She presided over the graduation of Anandi Gopal Joshi, the second Hindu woman to obtain a degree in Western medicine (the first being Kadambini Ganguly). The event was witnessed by Pandita Ramabai and she was congratulated by Queen Victoria. Bodley later wrote an introduction to Pandita Ramabai's book The High-Caste Hindu Woman (1887).

=== Notable organizations ===
As early as 1864, Rachel Bodley was being recognized nationally for her contribution to science and literature when the State Historical Society of Wisconsin made her a corresponding member. In 1871, she was then elected to the Academy of Natural Sciences of Philadelphia (presently Academy of Natural Sciences of Drexel University). As of 1873, she was a corresponding member of the Cincinnati Society of Natural History. Bodley was elected vice-president of the Joseph Priestley Centennial Commemoration, which celebrated 100 years since the discovery of oxygen by Joseph Priestley in 1774, and was held in his burial place of Northumberland at her suggestion. In 1876, Bodley helped to found the American Chemical Society of New York City, becoming chapter's first female member, in addition to a charter member. She also joined the New York Academy of Sciences that year. In 1880, she became a member of the Franklin Institute of Philadelphia, where she regularly held lecture courses in "Household Chemistry". 1882 found Bodley as a member of the Educational Society of Philadelphia, as well as accepting her first election to a 3-year term as director of the 29th school district of Philadelphia from 1882–1885. She was reelected to her position as director in 1887, but it was cut short by her death in 1888.

=== Personal life ===
According to her good friend Sarah K. Bolton, Bodley possessed various attributes that were conducive to her career success, including acute attention to detail, careful observation, modesty, and good organization. She was also described as friendly and dignified by Gulielma F. Alsop, who later composed a biography of Bodley.

Bodley maintained a passion for botany after her work on the herbarium, and always brought equipment for collecting and preparing plant specimens with her during summer trips to scenic and historic locations. Bodley encouraged students to pursue missionary work and maintained contact throughout the students careers. Bodley and her mother frequently hosted and entertained former students at the Bodley home when her former pupils returned from their medical missionary work.

Bodley devoted her free time and skills to maintaining and advancing the goals of the Women's College, for which she received high praise.

Rachel Bodley died of heart failure in her Philadelphia home on June 15, 1888. Her memorial service was held at the Women's Medical College on October 13, 1888. She was buried at Spring Grove Cemetery in Cincinnati.

== Works ==
- Catalogue of Plants Contained in Herbarium of Joseph Clark
- The College Story
