= Haimabati Sen =

Indian physician

- Born: Haimabati Ghosh; 1866; Kulna district, Bengal Presidency, British India
- Died: 5 August 1933 (aged 66–67)
- Other name: Haimabati Ghosh Mitra Sen
- Occupation: Physician
- Spouse: Kunjabihari Sen (m.1890)

Haimabati Sen (1866 – 5 August 1933) born Haimabati Ghosh, was an Indian physician.

== Early life ==
Haimabati Ghosh was born in the Khulna district, Bengal Presidency (now Bangladesh). Her father was a zamindar, a wealthy member of the Kulin Kayastha caste. As a very young widow, she trained as a teacher in Benares. After her second marriage, she attended the Campbell Medical College in Calcutta, and graduated at the top of her class in 1894.

== Career ==
Sen was a physician at the Lady Dufferin Women's Hospital in Hooghly from 1894 to 1910, and had a private practice in Chinsurah, until her death in the early 1930s. She wrote a "valuable" memoir in the 1920s, detailing her own struggles and her concerns for all young women: "Do I have to suffer all this simply because I am a woman? Would anyone have inflicted so much suffering on a man? Why are they so worried as to whose wife I am or whose daughter?" Her memoir was translated from Bengali and published in English many years later, in 2000.

== Personal life ==
Haimabati Ghosh married twice. She was first married at age 9, to a widower with two daughters; a year later, she was a child widow. Without the support of her husband, parents, brothers, or in-laws, she sought assistance at a widows' house in Benares, and joined the Brahmo Samaj community. In 1890, she married again, to Kunjabehari Sen. They had five children together. Haimabati Sen died in 1932 (or 1933), in her sixties.
