= Charles Frederick Farran =

Irish judge

Sir Charles Frederick Farran

5th Chief Justice of Bombay High Court
- In office 20 June 1895 – 9 September 1898
- Appointed by: Queen Victoria
- Preceded by: Charles Sargent
- Succeeded by: Louis Addin Kershaw

Judge of Bombay High Court
- In office 1890 – 19 June 1895
- Appointed by: Queen Victoria

Personal details
- Born: 29 January 1840
- Died: 9 September 1898 (aged 58)
- Education: Trinity College, Dublin

Sir Charles Frederick Farran (29 January 1840 – 9 September 1898) was an Irish judge who was the 5th Chief Justice of the Bombay High Court.

== Career ==
Farran was the third son of George and Elizabeth Farran of Belcamp House, County Dublin. He was educated at Trinity College, Dublin. He came to British India and worked as the Advocate General and Puisne Judge of Bombay Presidency. Frederick Farran was the first editor of the Indian Law Reports, Bombay Series, which commenced in 1875. In 1895, he was appointed the Chief Justice of the Bombay High Court on 22 June 1895 after Sir Charles Sargent and served there till 1898. He became knighted on 27 January 1896.

While in service, Farran died in Bombay.
