= Kavitha Rao =

- Education: National Law School of India University
- Occupations: Journalist, writer
- Writing career
- Notable work: Lady Doctors (2021)
- Website: Official website

Kavitha Rao is an Indian writer, journalist and former lawyer. Her books include Lady Doctors (2021).

== Biography ==
Kavitha Rao was born in Bangalore, India, and grew up in the UK, Iran and Bahrain. She studied arts and law at the National Law School of India University, Bangalore, and was subsequently employed as legal correspondent for The Economic Times. In 1996, she began her journeys around the world and returned to India in 2006.

Her account of six of the first Indian female doctors titled Lady Doctors was first published in India in 2021. In the same year, the book was long listed in Tata's literary awards.

== Selected publications ==
- Everything You Wanted To Know About Freelance Journalism (Co-author)
- Lady Doctors: The Untold Stories of India's First Women in Medicine. Westland Publications Private Limited. 2021. ISBN 978-93-90679-05-8.
- The Librarian. Kitaab International Singapore. 2017. ISBN 978-981-11-4365-6.
