= Nil Ratan Sircar Medical College and Hospital =

Public Medical College and tertiary teaching hospital in Kolkata, West Bengal, India

Nil Ratan Sircar Medical College & Hospital
- Former names: Sealdah Medical School (1873); Campbell Medical School (1884); Campbell Medical College (1894); NRS Medical College (1948)
- Motto: Viśva nī asvu bhaiṣajñana
- Recognition: NMC; INC
- Type: Public Medical College & Hospital
- Established: 1 December 1873; 152 years ago
- Academic affiliations: West Bengal University of Health Sciences
- Budget: ₹264.42 crore (US$27 million) (FY2023–24 est.)
- Principal: Dr. Sanat Kumar Ghosh
- Academic staff: 242 (2025)
- Students: 1,615 (2025)
- Undergraduates: 1,250 (2025)
- Postgraduates: 358 (2025)
- Doctoral students: 25 (2025)
- Location: 138, AJC Bose Road, Sealdah, Kolkata, India; 22°33′55″N 88°22′09″E
- Campus: 44 acres (18 ha); Metropolis
- Website: nrsmc.edu.in
- Government of West Bengal

Organisation
- Type: Teaching hospital
- Affiliated university: West Bengal University of Health Sciences

Services
- Standards: NMC
- Emergency department: Level II Trauma Center
- Beds: 2,802

Helipads
- Helipad: No

The Nil Ratan Sircar Medical College and Hospital, also known as NRS Medical College (formerly Campbell Medical College), is a public medical school and hospital in Kolkata, India. It is located in Sealdah, in the heart of Kolkata. The medical college was established on 1 December 1873 as Sealdah Medical School.

== History ==
In 1864, the British government was compelled to open a hospital due to the social and political pressures that arose from epidemics, class struggle, and the Sepoy Mutiny. Considering this urgent need, the decision was made to convert the Sealdah Market Building at Central Hall into what was to be known as the Sealdah Municipal Hospital.

On 1 December 1873, the Sealdah Medical School was established and underwent several name changes. In 1884, it was renamed the Campbell Medical School and in 1894 became the Campbell Medical College. After gaining independence from British rule in 1947, the college was renamed for the last time in 1948, to Nil Ratan Sircar Medical College in honour of freedom fighter and one of the college's famous alumnus, physician Sir Nilratan Sircar.

The institution is recognised under the National Medical Commission, New Delhi, and is run by the Government of West Bengal. It is affiliated with West Bengal University of Health Sciences and offers both undergraduate and postgraduate studies in various departments.

== Contributions ==
Throughout its history, many discoveries and treatments were fostered at Sealdah:

1. In 1912, Kedarnath Das innovated the Bengal Forceps which maintains a similar size to the pelvic curve of Asian and Bengali women and the size of the head of a baby.
2. In 1922, Upendranath Brahmachari discovered Urea Stibamine for the treatment of Kala-azar which was considered as a landmark in the field of antibiotics.
3. Cholera toxin was discovered by Sambhu Nath De in Nilratan Sircar Medical College and Hospital which was a milestone in the application of science in medical treatment.
4. Late Dr. A. K. Basu, a noted surgeon and head of the Department of Surgery (1950–1955) successfully performed the first cardiac surgery in India in this institution.
5. Subhash Mukhopadhyay (physician) worked with the first "test-tube baby".
6. Pradip Mukherjee separated four sets of conjoined twins. The first one done in the year 1999.
7. The work on Natural Valve Replacement and Coronary Bypass by Saibal Gupta.
8. Elbow prosthesis by D.P. Bakshi.

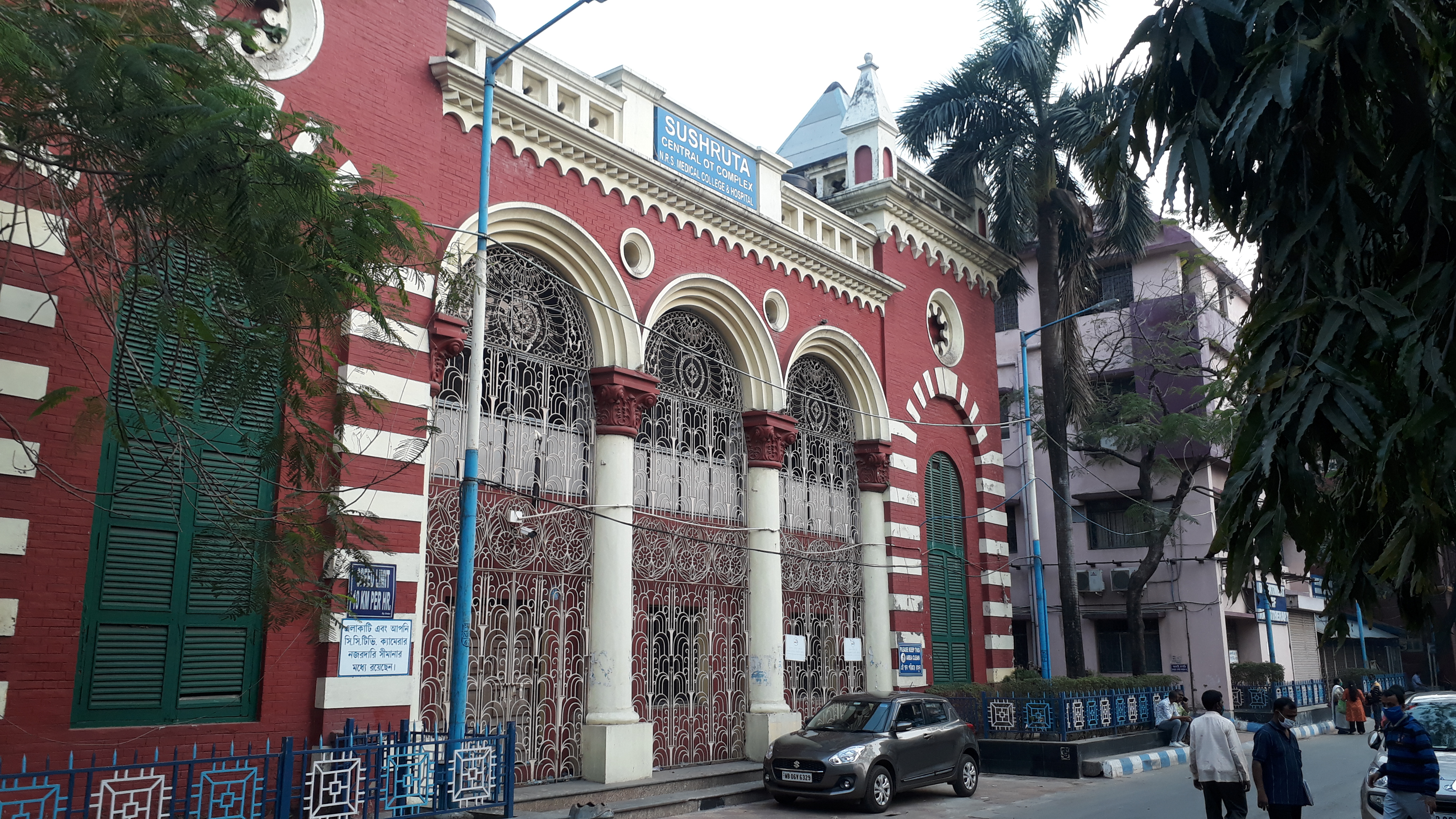
Central OT Complex, NRS Medical College

== Central Library ==
The NRSMCH library is situated on the entire third floor of the Academic Building. It occupies almost a 4,000 square meter area. The reading rooms and the seating capacity of the library have been increased per the guideline of the NMC for 250 undergraduate admissions annually. The reading area for students is separated into indoor and outdoor reading rooms, each with a 250 seating capacity. The reading areas for the faculty, PG, and PDT students (each with a seating capacity of 50) have been shifted to the southern side of the library. Most of the library is air-conditioned. The digital library has been revamped with the addition of new computers and other equipment. The NRSMCH library is a part of the Institutional Member of British Council Library, Kolkata.

The Ministry of Human Resource Development (MHRD), of India, under its NMEICT mission, has entrusted IIT Kharagpur to host, coordinate, and set-up the National Digital Library (NDL) of India.

A workshop was organised on "Institutional Digital Repository and Medical Metadata Engineering" at AIIMS, New Delhi, on 20–21 October 2016. Professor Prantar Chakraborty, HOD, Department of Hematology, Mr. Mani Mohan Ghosh, librarian, and Mr. Sayak Mukherjee, IT Support Personnel have attended the workshop and acquired the training to frame a repository to create the National Knowledge Asset – the key driving force for education, research, innovation, and knowledge in the medical field.

== Departments ==
A. Pre-clinical

1. Anatomy
2. Physiology
3. Biochemistry

B. Para-clinical

1. Pathology
2. Pharmacology
3. Microbiology
4. Forensic Medicine & Toxicology
5. Community Medicine
6. Physical Medicine & Rehabilitation

C. Clinical

1. General Medicine
2. General Surgery
3. Obstetrics & Gynecology
4. Pediatric Medicine
5. Ophthalmology
6. ENT (Otorhinolaryngology)
7. Respiratory Medicine
8. Anesthesiology
9. Dermatology
10. Radio-Diagnosis
11. Psychiatry
12. Orthopedics
13. Physical Medicine and Rehabilitation
14. Transfusion Medicine & Blood Bank

D. Super-Speciality

1. Cardiology
2. Neurology
3. Nephrology
4. Endocrinology
5. Cardio Thoracic Vascular Surgery (CTVS)
6. Pediatric Surgery
7. Neurosurgery
8. Oncology and Radiotherapy
9. Plastic Surgery
10. Urology
11. Hematopathology

== Notable alumni ==
- Nilratan Sircar, namesake of the institute and an eminent Indian doctor, educationist, philanthropist and swadeshi entrepreneur.
- Vece Paes, former Indian hockey midfielder, and representing the Indian team in the 1972 Munich Olympics, that won the bronze medal.
- Hemchandra Kanungo, freedom fighter, revolutionary, one of the first revolutionaries to go abroad to learn the techniques of bomb making, founding member of Anushilan Samiti, designer of the First flag of India.
- Ram Chandra Dome an Indian politician and a leader of the Communist Party of India (Marxist). A doctor by profession, he was a M.P. elected to the Lok Sabha from Birbhum in West Bengal state in 1989, 1991, 1996, 1998, 1999 and 2004. In 2009, he was elected to the Lok Sabha from Bolpur.
- Haimabati Sen (class of 1894), physician and memoirist.
- Uma Saren was the M.P. from Jhargram (2014–19). She was the 1st Santhali woman in the Parliament.
- Anil Kumar Mandal, known for his research on glaucoma. Also an elected fellow of the National Academy of Medical Sciences.
- Cyriac Abby Philips, known for his research on liver diseases.
- Zikrul Haque (class of 1939), physician and politician
- Ratan Chandra Kar (Padma Shri awardee) known for helping the Jarawas (Andaman Islands) from disease outbreaks, such as measles in 1998.
- Subhash Mukhopadhyay (physician)

== Gallery ==
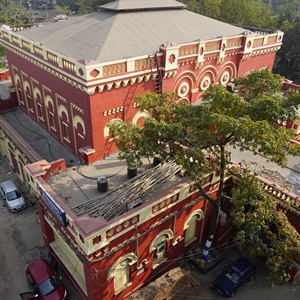
Fraser Ward NRS Hospital

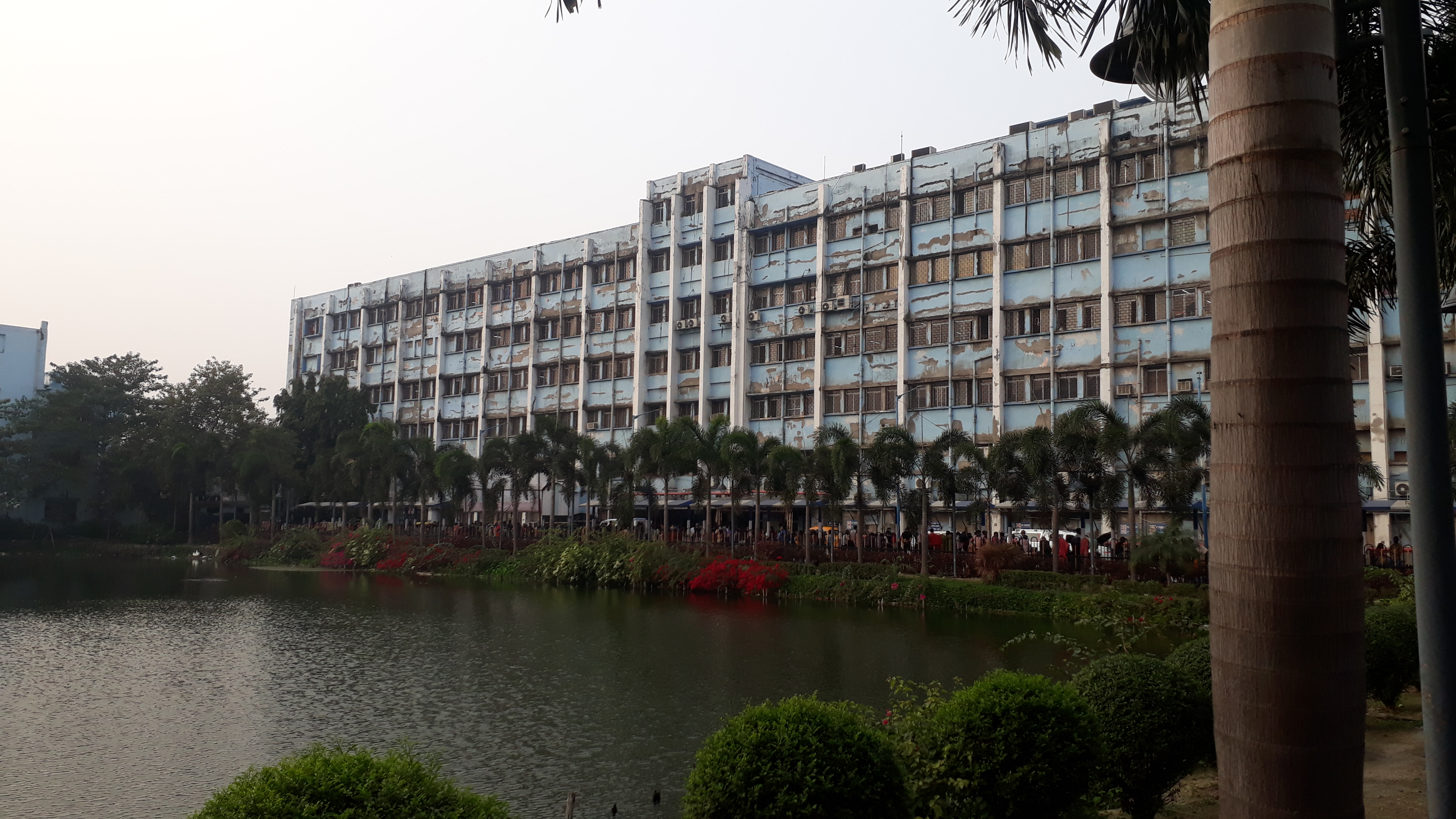
Panaromic view of NRS Medical College

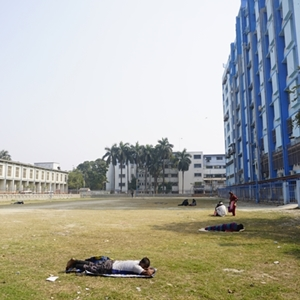
Playground NRS Medical College

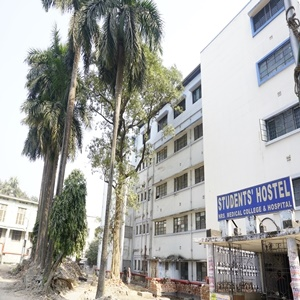
Boys Hostel NRS Medical College
