= Pandita Ramabai =

Indian feminist historian and social reformer (1858–1922)

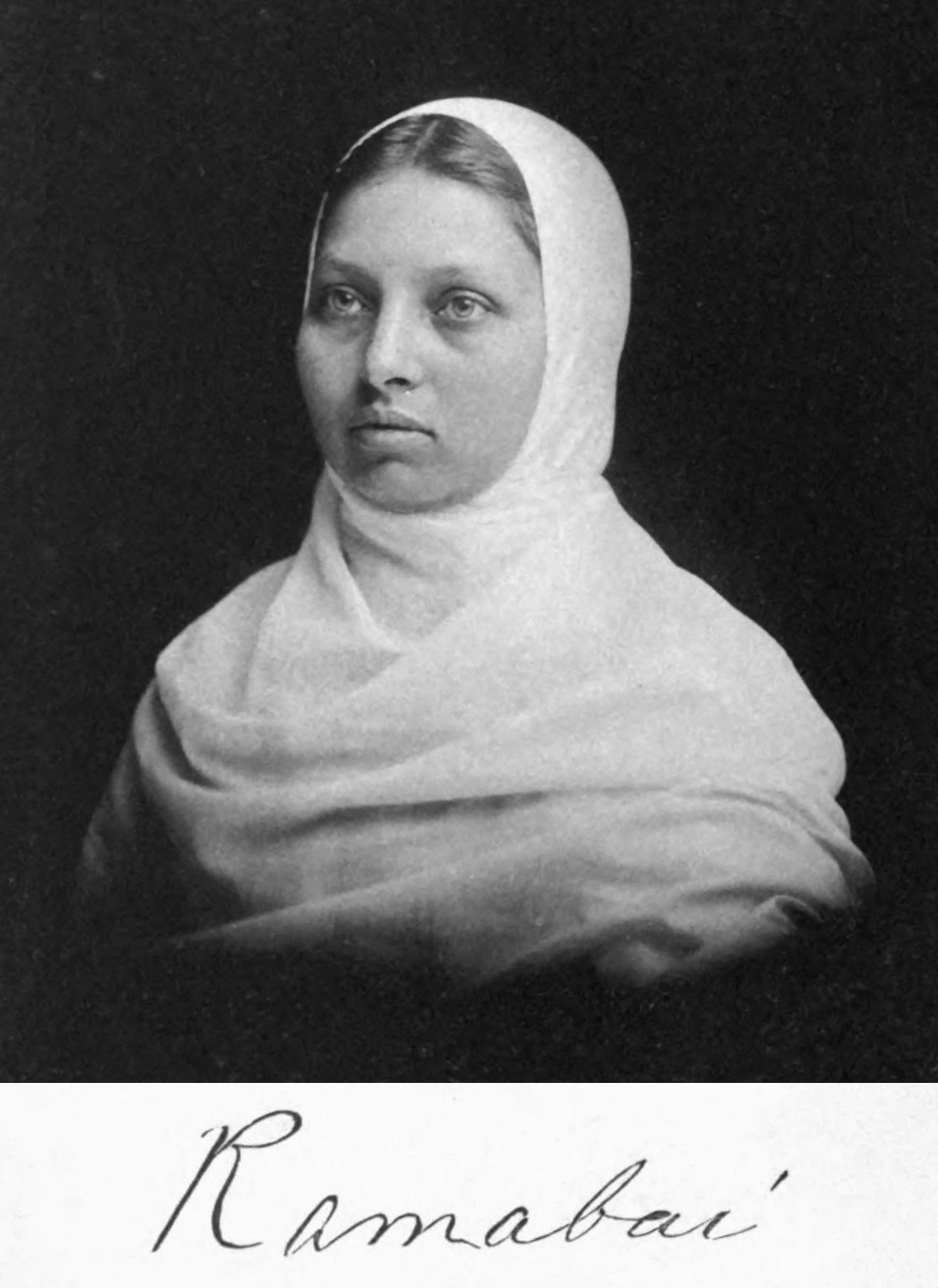
- Born: Rama Dongre; 23 April 1858; Mangalore, Madras Presidency, British India
- Died: 5 April 1922 (aged 63); Kedgaon, Bombay Presidency, British India
- Occupation: Social reformer
- Years active: 1885–1922
- Organization(s): Pandita Ramabai Mukti Mission, Kedgaon
- Known for: Ministry among destitute and orphan girls
- Notable work: The High Caste Hindu Woman (1887)
- Spouse: Bipin Behari Medhvi (m. 1880; died 1882)
- Children: Manorama (born in 1881)
- Relatives: Anandi Gopal Joshi (cousin)

Pandita Ramabai Sarasvati (23 April 1858 – 5 April 1922) was an Indian social reformer and Christian missionary. She was the first woman to be awarded the titles of Pandita as a Sanskrit scholar and Sarasvati after being examined by the faculty of the University of Calcutta. She was one of the ten women delegates of the Indian National Congress session of 1889. During her stay in England in early 1880s she converted to Christianity. She then toured extensively in the United States to collect funds for destitute Indian women. With the funds raised, she started Sharada Sadan (Home for Learning) for child widows. In the late 1890s, Ramabai founded Mukti Mission, a Christian charity at Kedgaon village, forty miles east of the city of Pune. The mission was later named Pandita Ramabai Mukti Mission. In 1883, she testified before the Hunter Commission in support of female education in India.

== Early life and education ==
Pandita Ramabai Sarasvati was born as Ramabai (Note: Some sources state Rama) Dongre on 23 April 1858 into a Marathi-speaking Chitpavan high-caste Brahmin family. Her father, Anant Shastri Dongre, a Sanskrit scholar, taught her Sanskrit at home. Anant Dongre's extraordinary piety led him to travel extensively across India with his family in tow. Her mother, Lakshmi was married to the much older Anant Shastri at the age of nine. Anant Shastri was in favour of female education and started teaching Sanskrit to Lakshmi. This was in stark contrast to the prevalent customs. Ramabai gained exposure to public speaking by participating in the family's public recitation of the Purana at pilgrimage sites around India, which is how they earned a meager living. Lakshmi became so adept at Sanskrit that she also would even teach young boys, but this was opposed severely by the orthodox Brahmins. These were the circumstances which compelled Anant Shastri to move with his family to a rather desolate place.

Orphaned at the age of 16 during the Great Famine of 1876–78, Ramabai and her brother Srinivas continued the family tradition of travelling the country reciting Sanskrit scriptures. Ramabai was comfortable in addressing all genders but women in those times would not come out in public spaces. Sometimes, she would go inside the female quarters to convince the women to get educated. Ramabai's fame as a woman adept in Sanskrit reached Calcutta, where the pandits invited her to speak. A British officer, W. W. Hunter, was acquainted with her through news of her address in an Indian newspaper. Her address in the senate hall of Calcutta University was well-received and won her great acclaim. In 1878, Calcutta University conferred on her the titles of Pandita and Sarasvati in recognition of her knowledge of various Sanskrit works.

This was her first exposure to the Bengali gentry and Christianity. Ramabai and Srinivas were meeting a number of Sanskrit scholars but she was quite astonished to attend a meeting of Christians. She admitted to being impressed by the Christian mode of worshipping. The theistic reformer Keshab Chandra Sen gave her a copy of the Vedas, the most sacred of all Hindu literature, and encouraged her to read them. This was the time Ramabai encountered new influences and began to question her old beliefs.

She met Bipin Chandra Madhvi at the Sylhet District school, he was part of the committee organised to welcome her. After the death of Srinivas in 1880, Ramabai married Bipin Behari Medhvi, a Bengali lawyer, from the Kayastha community, a lower caste than Ramabai. The marriage was inter-caste and inter-regional and considered inappropriate during this period. They were married in a civil ceremony on 13 November 1880. The couple had a daughter on 16 April 1881 whom they named Manorama (english translation:heart's joy). Around this time Ramabai wrote a poem on the deplorable condition of Sanskrit and sent it to the forthcoming Oriental Congress to be held in Berlin. Its translation was read with her introduction and deep appreciation by Indologist Monier Monier-Williams. Unfortunately, Bipin Bihari Medhvi succumbed to cholera on 4 February 1882. This was a time that Ramabai recalled that due to her unorthodox ways, no one thought of her except her cousin Anandibai but in her depression, she could not respond to her kind offer of support. After Medhvi's death, Ramabai, who was only 23, moved to Pune and founded the Arya Mahila Samaj (Arya Women's Society). Influenced by the ideals of Jesus Christ, the Brahmo Samaj, and Hindu reformers, the purpose of the society was to promote the cause of women's education and deliverance from the oppression of child marriage.

== Social activism ==
When in 1882 the Hunter Commission was appointed by the colonial Government of India to look into education, Ramabai gave evidence before it. In an address before the Hunter Commission, she declared, "In ninety-nine cases out of a hundred the educated men of this country are opposed to female education and the proper position of women. If they observe the slightest fault, they magnify the grain of mustard-seed into a mountain, and try to ruin the character of a woman". She suggested that teachers be trained and women school inspectors be appointed. Further, she said that as the situation in India was that women's conditions were such that women could only medically treat them, Indian women should be admitted to medical colleges. Ramabai's evidence created a great sensation and reached and possibly influenced Queen Victoria. It bore fruit later in starting of the Women's Medical Movement by Lord Dufferin. In Maharashtra, Ramabai made contact with Christian organisations also involved in women's education and medical missionary work, in particular a community of Anglican nuns, the Community of St. Mary the Virgin (CSMV).

With earnings from the sale of her first book, Stri Dharma Niti ("Morals for Women", 1882) and contacts with the CSMV, Ramabai went to Britain in 1883 to start medical training; she was rejected from medical programs because of progressive deafness. During her stay she converted to Christianity. Among the reasons Ramabai gave for her conversion was her growing disillusionment with orthodox Hinduism and particularly what she saw as its ill regard of women. In an autobiographical account of her conversion written years later, Ramabai wrote that there were, "only two things on which all those books, the Dharma Shastras, the sacred epics, the Puranas and modern poets, the popular preachers of the present day and orthodox high-caste men, were agreed, that women of high and low caste, as a class were bad, very bad, worse than demons, as unholy as untruth; and that they could not get Moksha as men". Ramabai had a contentious relationship with her Anglican "mentors" in England, particularly Sister Geraldine, and asserted her independence in a variety of ways: she maintained her vegetarian diet, rejected aspects of Anglican doctrine that she regarded as irrational, including the doctrine of the Trinity, and questioned whether the crucifix she was asked to wear had to have a Latin inscription instead of the Sanskrit inscription she wished for.

In 1886, she travelled from Britain to the United States at the invitation of Dr. Rachel Bodley, Dean of the Women's Medical College of Pennsylvania, to attend the graduation of her relative and the first female Indian doctor, Anandibai Joshi, staying for two years. During this time she also translated textbooks and gave lectures throughout the United States and Canada. She also published one of her most important books, The High-Caste Hindu Woman. Her first book written in English, Ramabai dedicated it to her cousin, Dr. Joshi. The High-Caste Hindu Woman showed the darkest aspects of the life of Hindu women, including child brides and child widows, and sought to expose the oppression of women in Hindu-dominated British India. Through speaking engagements and the development of a wide network of supporters, Ramabai raised the equivalent of 60,000 rupees to launch a school in India for the child widows whose difficult lives her book exposed.

While giving presentations in the U.S. to seek support for her work in India, Ramabai met American Suffragette and Women's rights activist, Frances Willard in July 1887. Willard invited Ramabai to speak at the national Woman's Christian Temperance Union convention in November 1887 where she gained the support of this large women's organisation. She returned to India in June 1888 as a National Lecturer for the WCTU. Mary Greenleaf Clement Leavitt, the first World Missionary of the WCTU, was already there when Ramabai returned, but they did not meet. Ramabai worked however with the WCTU of India once it was officially organised in 1893.

In 1889, Ramabai returned to India, and founded a school for child widows in Pune called Sharada Sadan, which had the support of many Hindu reformers, including M.G. Ranade. Although Ramabai did not engage in overt evangelism, she did not hide her Christian faith either, and when several students converted to Christianity, she lost the backing of Pune's Hindu reform circles. She moved the school 60 kilometers east to the much quieter village of Kedgaon, and changed its name to the Mukti Mission. In 1896, during a severe famine, Ramabai toured the villages of Maharashtra with a caravan of bullock carts and rescued thousands of outcast children, child widows, orphans and other destitute women, and brought them to the shelter of the Mukti Mission. By 1900 there were 1,500 residents and over a hundred cattle in the Mukti mission. A learned woman knowing seven languages, she also translated the Bible into her mother tongue—Marathi—from the original Hebrew and Greek. The Pandita Ramabai Mukti Mission is still active today, providing housing, education, vocational training, etc. for many needy groups including widows, orphans, and the blind.

== Conservative Opposition ==
Ramabai experienced opposition to her social activism from conservative members of Indian society, especially upper-caste Maharashtrian elites. For example, B.G. Tilak repeatedly used Kesari, his paper, to criticize Ramabai's attempts to help widows and other women. Some of Tilak's critical language of Ramabai was vulgar.

== Influence on early Pentecostalism ==
Scholars of Pentecostalism have begun to explore the possibility that rather than having originated in a singular event at the famous Azusa Street Church in Los Angeles in 1906, the origins of Pentecostalism can be traced to religious revivals around the world, which were interpreted by participants as signs of a new era in Christian history. The extraordinary psycho-physical states that accompanied the emotionally intense revivals took different shape in different places. Minnie Abrams, Ramabai's American assistant and a veteran missionary with close associations with the Holiness movement, reported that in June 1905, ten months before the Azusa Street revival, a matron came upon a dormitory of girls weeping, praying, and confessing their sins. Then, one girl testified that she had been startled from sleep by the sensation of being bathed in fire. As Michael Bergunder has argued, the Mukti Mission was part of a network of Protestant missionary institutions that by the early twentieth century spanned the globe. This network was constituted by a vast system of newsletters, pamphlets, books and other kinds of print media, along with conferences that brought missionaries into conversation with each other, and travel that took missionaries and supporters from one mission station to the next. Thus, news about the "holy fire" at the Mukti Mission, along with revivals happening with apparent simultaneity around the world led many to believe a global "outpouring of the Holy Spirit" was underway. Many missionaries visited Kedgaon and volunteer there in response to the news of the outbreak of the Holy Spirit among the students.

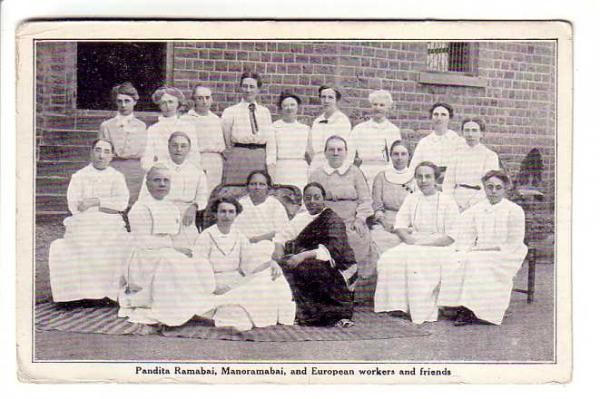
Pandita Ramabai, Manorama, European and American Missionary supporters

== Personal life ==
Pandita Ramabai's family life departed from the norms expected of women in her day. Her childhood was full of hardships and she lost her parents early. Her marriage to Bipin Bihari Medhvi crossed caste lines and she was widowed after just two years of marriage. Under ordinary circumstances, such a tragedy put nineteenth-century Indian women in a vulnerable condition, dependent upon their deceased husband's family for support. Pandita Ramabai, however, persevered as an independent woman, and a single mother to Manorama Bai. She ensured that Manorama Bai was educated, both in Wantage by the sisters of the CSMV, and later at Bombay University, where Manorama earned her BA. After going to the United States for higher studies, Manorama Bai returned to India where she worked side-by-side with Ramabai. Serving first as Principal of Sharada Sadan, she also assisted her mother in establishing Christian High School at Gulbarga (now in Karnataka), a backward district of south India, during 1912. In 1920 Ramabai's health began to flag and she designated her daughter as her designated successor at the Mukti Mission. However, Manorama predeceased her mother in 1921. Her death was a shock to Ramabai. Nine months later, on 5 April 1922, Ramabai herself died from septic bronchitis, at age 63.

== Awards and honors ==
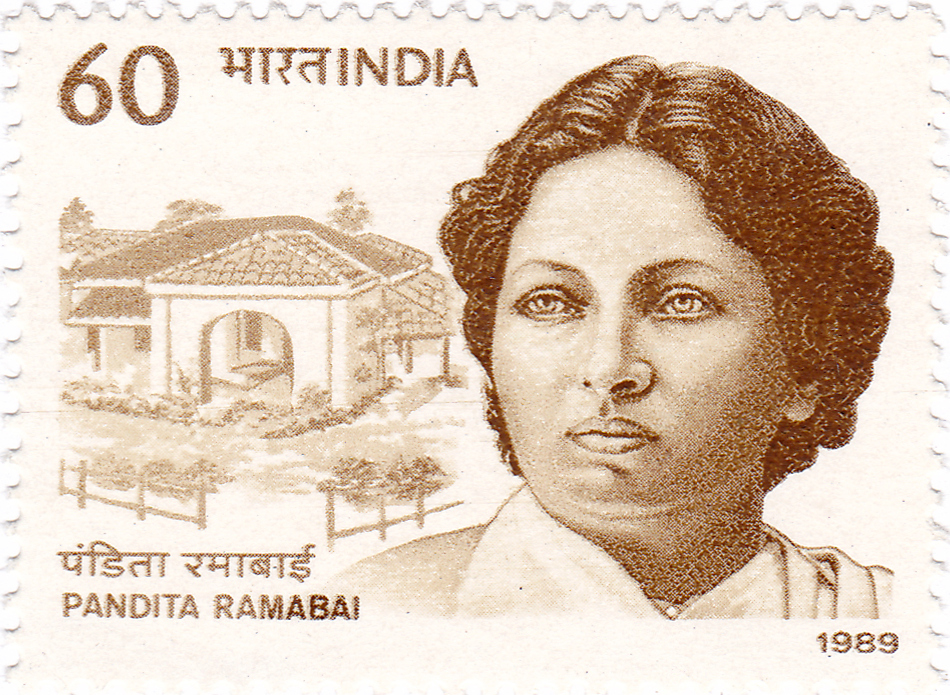
Ramabai on a 1989 stamp of India

- "Pandita" and "Sarasvati" at Bengal (before going to Britain), recognising her skills in Sanskrit.
- Kaisar-i-Hind Medal for community service in 1919, awarded by the British Colonial Government of India.
- She is remembered in the Church of England with a commemoration on 30 April.
- On 26 October 1989, in recognition of her contribution to the advancement of Indian women, the Government of India issued a commemorative stamp.

== See also ==
- Kartini

== Ramabai's Works ==
- Ramabai, Pandita. Pandita Ramabai's American Encounter: The Peoples of the United States (1889), online
- Ramabai Sarasvati, Pandita. The High-Caste Hindu woman (1888) online
- Kosambi, Meera, ed. Pandita Ramabai through her own words: Selected works (Oxford University Press, 2000).
- Shah, A.B., ed.; Sister Geraldine, ed. The Letters and Correspondence of Pandita Ramabai (Maharashtra State Board for Literature and Culture, 1977)
