= Henry Curwen (journalist) =

English journalist and author

Henry Curwen (1845–1892) was an English journalist and author, who became editor of The Times of India.

== Life ==
He was born at Workington Hall, the son of Henry Curwen, rector of Workington in Cumberland; his father was a younger son of Henry Christian Curwen (1783–1860), and his mother Dora Goldie was daughter of Alexander John Goldie. He was educated at Rossall School, and then worked in London for John Camden Hotten the publisher.

In 1876 Curwen left England for India, and settled there. Nassau Lees, who had recently acquired the Times of India published in Bombay, took on Curwen as assistant editor, under Grattan Geary the editor. Curwen wrote in the paper an account of a tour through districts affected by the Great Famine of 1876–78.

In 1880 Curwen became chief editor of the Times of India, and began to improve its reputation. The will of Lees, who died in 1889, gave him a chance to buy the concern. He became proprietor, with Charles Kane as his manager.

Curwen's health failed, and he died, unmarried, on 22 February 1892. He was on board the P&O ship SS Ravenna, three days out of Bombay, and he was buried at sea. A brass memorial tablet was placed in St Thomas's Cathedral, Bombay.

== Works ==
For Hotten, Curwen was involved in compiling books including The Golden Treasury of Thought. His work under his own name was a volume of translations Echoes from French Poets published by Hotten in 1870, and contained verse translations from Alfred de Musset, Alphonse de Lamartine, Charles Baudelaire, and others. He translated also Baudelaire's Study of Edgar Allan Poe in 1872.

In the Westminster Review Curwen wrote between 1871 and 1873 his own account of Poe's career, and also detailed articles on Henri Murger, Novalis, Sándor Petőfi, Honoré de Balzac, and André Chenier. These articles were collected in two volumes (1874), as Sorrow and Song; Studies of Literary Struggle. Other works were:

- A History of Booksellers; the New and the Old (1873)
- Within Bohemia, or Love in London (1876), a volume of short stories, followed by others
- Plodding on; or, the Jog Trot to Fame and Fortune (1879), novel
- Zit and Xoe (1886), novel (anonymous), reprinted from Blackwood's Magazine. A novel about two prehistoric Archaic humans.
- Lady Bluebeard (1888, two vols.), novel (anonymous)
- Dr. Hermione (1891), novel (anonymous).
