= Sidney Meadows =

British Member of Parliament

Sir Sidney Meadows (c. 1699 – 15 November 1792) was a British Member of Parliament and Knight Marshal of the King's Household during the reign of George II and George III.

== Family ==
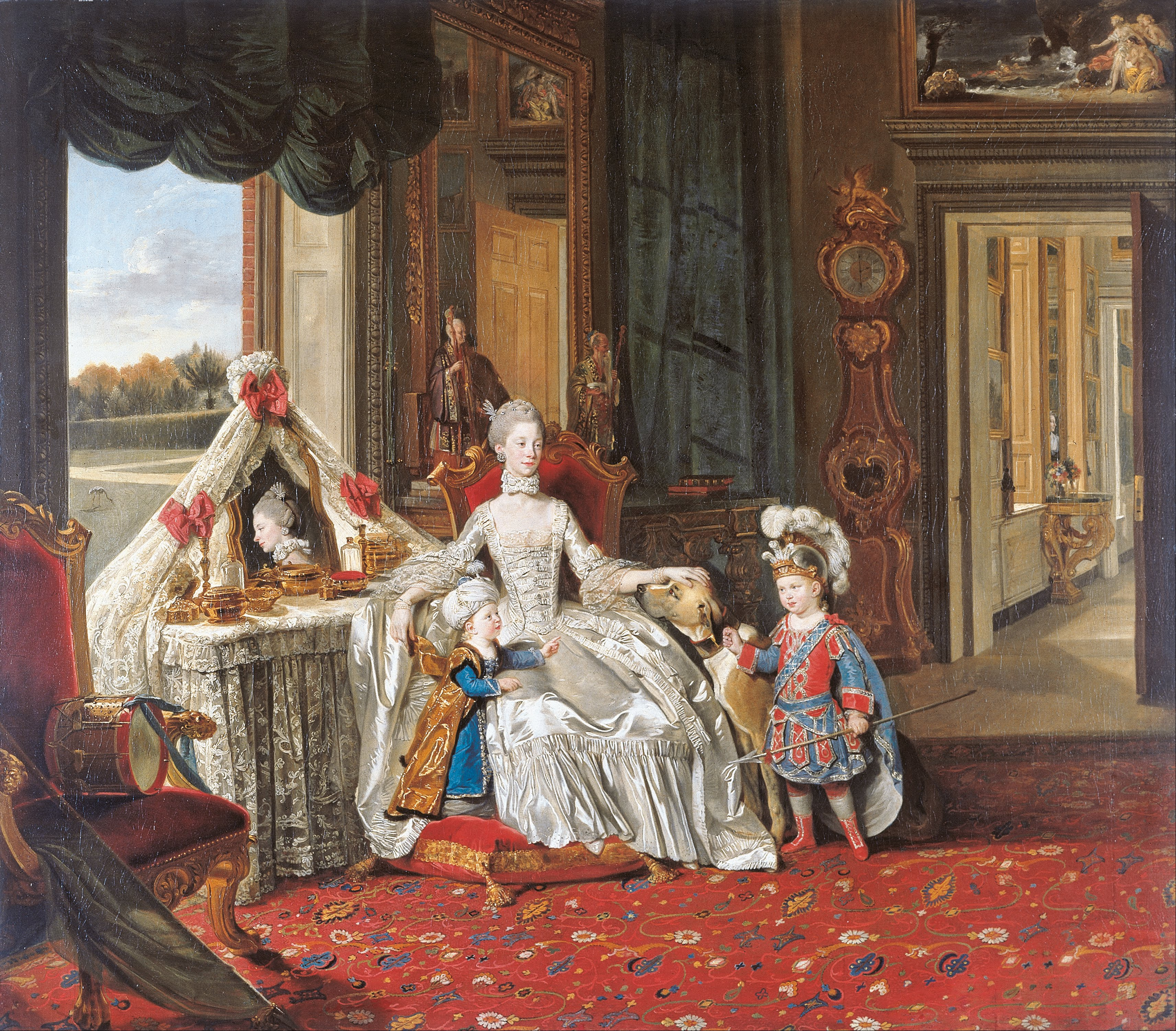
Sir Sidney Meadows' daughter, Frances, was Maid of Honour to Queen Charlotte, (seated) when Johan Zoffany painted this portrait in 1765

He was the eldest son of the diplomat Sir Philip Meadowes (1672-1757), of Brompton, Kensington, and his wife Dorothy, daughter of Edward Boscawen. On 2 June 1742 he married Jemima, daughter of the Hon. Charles Montagu of Durham and granddaughter of Edward Montagu, 1st Earl of Sandwich. Earl Sandwich's grandson - Edward Montagu - and his wife Elizabeth, leader of the Blue Stockings Society, were Meadows' brother and sister-in-law. Horace Walpole references the wealth of Sir Sidney and Lady Meadows in his published correspondence.

In 1768, Queen Charlotte "set the worthy King to work to patch up" with Sir Sidney the scandal of the "stolen marriage" Sir Sidney's daughter Frances (1741-1769) - Charlotte's Maid of Honour - had made with Captain Campbell, "a penniless officer". Despite not "giving notice to the queen or her father", Charlotte kept the peace and generously gave "her late maid of honour a thousand pounds". Frances died in "childbed" i.e., giving birth to her only son.

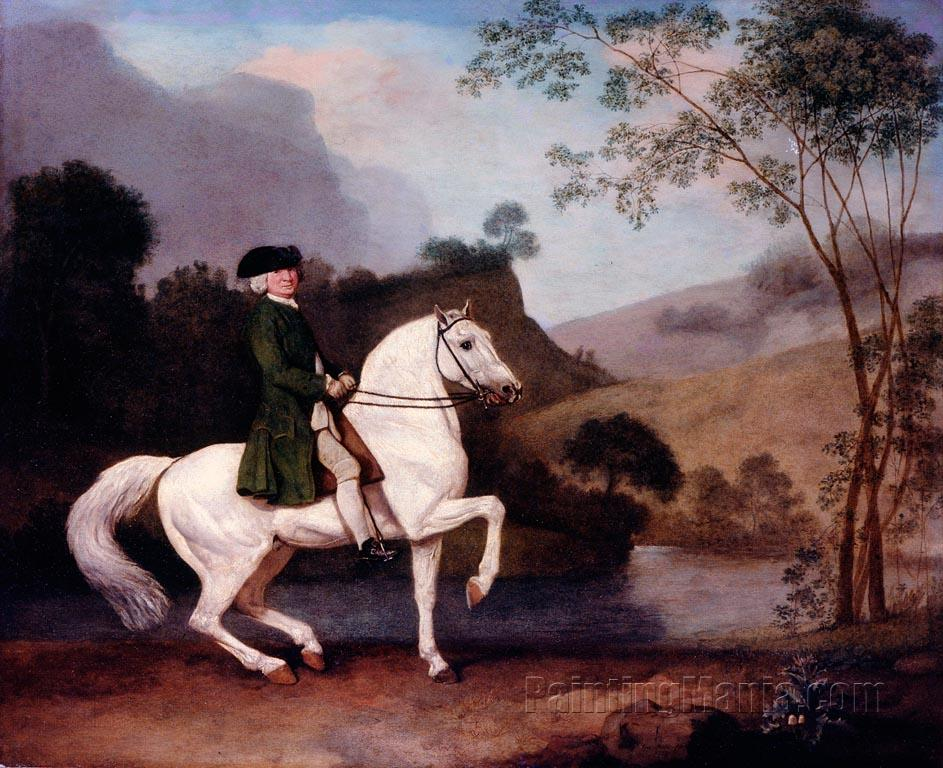
Sir Sidney Meadows, by George Stubbs, RA, 1778, 32 x 40 inches, Royal Collection

== Career ==
Through the influence of his uncle Hugh Boscawen, 1st Viscount Falmouth, Meadows was returned to Parliament for Penryn in 1722 and for Truro in 1727. In 1734 he was nominated Member for Tavistock by the Duke of Bedford. All his recorded votes were against the government and he did not stand in 1741. In 1757 he succeeded his father and in 1758 he was appointed Knight Marshal, one of the judges (along with the Lord Steward of the Household) of the Marshalsea Court. He held this office until his death. In 1761, Sidney Meadows was promoted to the position of Deputy Ranger of Richmond Park in the grazing and agricultutral branches under the direction of King George III, himself interested in the management of the park. Prime Minister John Stuart, 3rd Earl of Bute was Ranger. Sidney's brother, Philip (1708-1781), took over the role of Deputy Ranger of Richmond Park and held it until his death.

=== Equestrian ===
A talented horseman, Meadows made many improvements in the "art of horsemanship". George Stubbs painted a portrait of him upon his horse. Meadows conducted a riding house in Mayfair and gave riding lessons to the nobility, believing they would benefit from his expertise. A "strong-built man", Meadows was still giving horse-riding instructions when "approaching eighty". Hester Thrale, celebrated member of the Blue Stockings Society, observed both his horses and his equestrian skills favourably when visiting him at his "riding house".

Parliament of Great Britain
Preceded by Samuel Trefusis; Viscount Rialton	Member of Parliament for Penryn; 1722 – 1727; With: Edward Vernon	Succeeded by Sir Cecil Bishopp, Bt; Edward Vernon
Preceded by Spencer Cowper; Thomas Wyndham	Member of Parliament for Truro; 1727 – 1734; With: Hugh Boscawen	Succeeded by Kelland Courtenay; Robert Trefusis
Preceded by Sir Francis Henry Drake, Bt; Sir Humphrey Monoux, Bt	Member of Parliament for Tavistock; 1734 – 1741; With: Hon. Charles Fane	Succeeded by Hon. Charles Fane; Lord Sherard Manners
