= Philip Meadows =

Philip Meadows may refer to:

- Philip Meadows (died 1718), English diplomat and official
- Philip Meadows (died 1781), deputy ranger of Windsor Park
- Philip Meadowes, English politician and diplomat, son of Philip Meadows (died 1718)
