= William Godolphin, Marquess of Blandford =

English nobleman and politician

The Most Honourable Marquess of Blandford
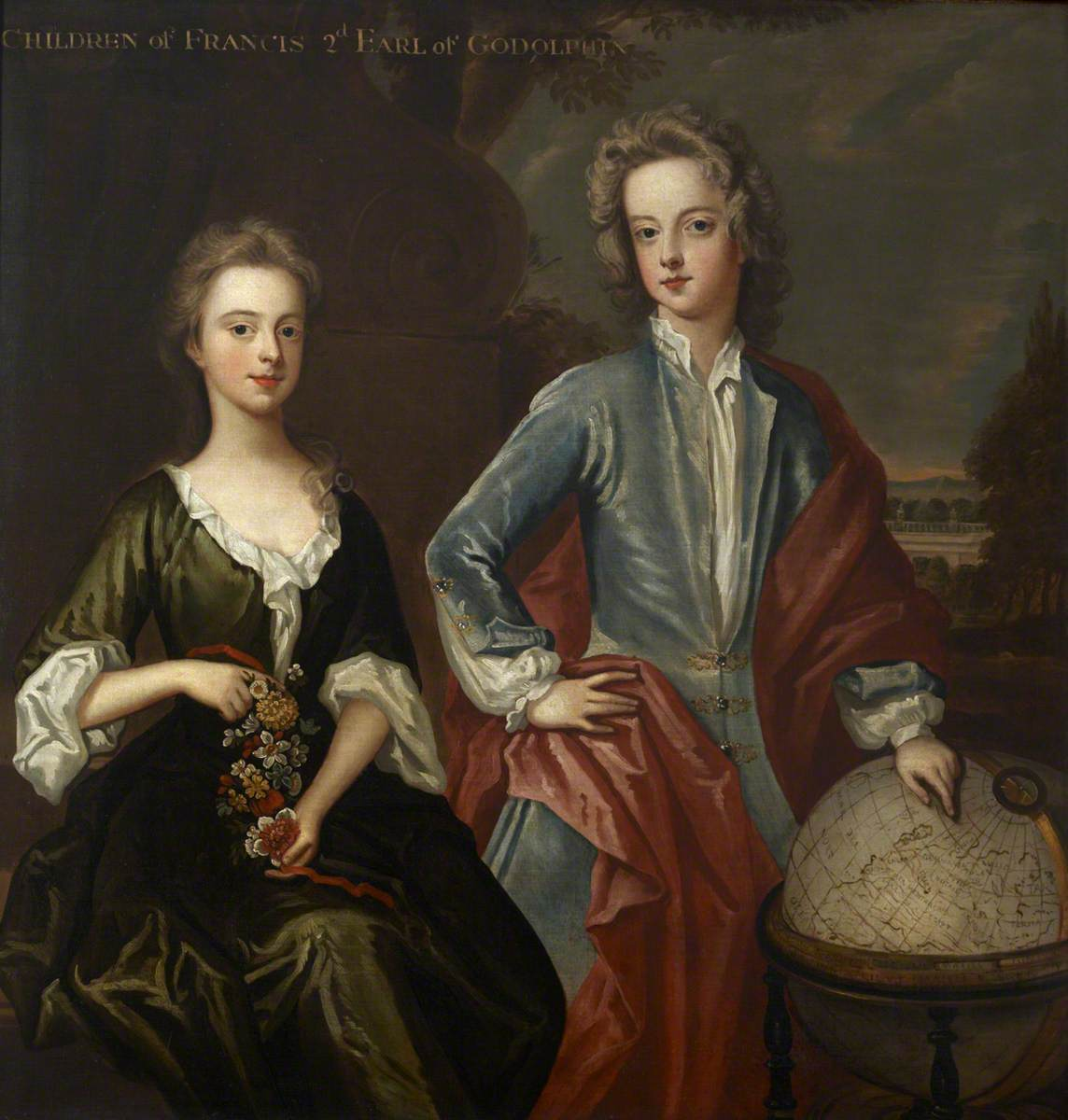
- Portrait of 'Willigo' and his sister, 'Harriot'

Member of the British Parliament for Penryn
- In office 1720–1722

Member of the British Parliament for Woodstock
- In office 1727–1731

Personal details
- Born: c. 1699
- Died: 24 August 1731 Oxford, Oxfordshire, England
- Spouse: Maria Catherina Haeck de Jong
- Parents: Francis Godolphin, 2nd Earl of Godolphin (father); Lady Henrietta Godolphin (mother)

William Godolphin, Marquess of Blandford (c. 1699 – 24 August 1731), styled as Viscount Rialton until 1722, was an English nobleman and politician who sat in the House of Commons between 1720 and 1731.

Heir to the Dukedom of Marlborough and Earldom of Godolphin (and thus one of the largest fortunes in the country), Godolphin was the eldest son of Francis Godolphin, 2nd Earl of Godolphin and his wife, the heiress, Lady Henrietta Churchill (later suo jure Duchess of Marlborough). His grandparents were Sidney Godolphin, 1st Earl of Godolphin and John Churchill, 1st Duke of Marlborough, respectively.

== Biography ==
In 1712, Godolphin's father succeeded as 2nd Earl of Godolphin (Lord Godolphin had been promoted in 1706). As heir-apparent to the earldom, he assumed the courtesy title Viscount Rialton. He was educated at Pembroke College, Cambridge.

=== Member of Parliament ===
On 9 June 1720, Hugh Boscawen, the Member of Parliament for Penryn, was raised to the House of Lords as Viscount Falmouth. Lord Rialton was elected to the House of Commons in his place on 24 June 1720, sitting as a Whig. He was related to Lord Falmouth on both his father's and his mother's side, as Falmouth was a grandson of Sir Francis Godolphin and had married Charlotte Godfrey, daughter of Arabella Churchill. Rialton represented Penryn for the remainder of the Parliament and was not re-elected in the general election of 1722.

On 16 June 1722 Lord Rialton's maternal grandfather the Duke of Marlborough died, and was succeeded by his daughter Henrietta under a special Act of Parliament. William Godolphin was now heir-apparent to his mother's dukedom as well as his father's earldom, and adopted the higher courtesy title of Marquess of Blandford. He returned to Parliament at the general election of 1727, being elected for Woodstock on 21 August.

On 30 August 1730, he was made an honorary Doctor of Civil Laws by the University of Oxford.

=== Marriage ===
On 25 April 1729, Lord Blandford married Maria Catherina Haeck de Jong (1695–1779), the daughter of Peter Haeck de Jong, burgomaster of Utrecht. He had married without his parents' consent, the Lady Blandford being neither English, nor a noblewoman by birth. Although, Lady Blandford's sister, Isabella, had married the Earl of Denbigh.

=== Death ===
Lord Blandford died at Balliol College, Oxford of apoplexy on 24 August 1731. Lord Egmont noted in his diary that this was probably brought on by a drinking bout. As he had no children and no surviving brother, the heir to the Dukedom of Marlborough was now his first cousin the Earl of Sunderland. Lord Sunderland's brother John Spencer was elected to Parliament in Blandford's place on 22 January 1732. The Earldom of Godolphin now had no heir, but Lord Godolphin was granted a barony in 1735 that would allow more distant members of the Godolphin family to succeed.

Lady Blandford remarried on 1 June 1734, Harlington, Middlesex, the Tory MP Sir William Wyndham, as his second wife. She was widowed again on 17 June 1740 and died at Sheen on 7 September 1779.

== Assessment ==
Lord Egmont stated in his diary the following:

"My Lord was about thirty four [sic] and had several good qualities. He was very charitable...He was likewise virtuous as to woman, even before his marriage. His only fault was drinking and loving low company. He was pious and had no sort of pride or ambition. He married a Burgomaster's daughter at Utrecht for love, who was some years older than himself, after the Earl of Denbigh's example, who married her sister. She made a good wife and has four thousand pounds a year jointure, but brought him no child."

According to Vicary Gibbs:

"Nature designed him for an excellent man, but the joviality of the times, his own social disposition, and the errors of his education led him astray."

== See also ==
- William Feilding, 5th Earl of Denbigh

== Notes ==
Parliament of Great Britain
Preceded by Hugh Boscawen; Samuel Trefusis	Member of Parliament for Penryn; 1720–1722; With: Samuel Trefusis	Succeeded by Sidney Meadows; Edward Vernon
Preceded by Sir Thomas Wheate; Samuel Trotman	Member of Parliament for Woodstock; 1727–1731; With: Samuel Trotman	Succeeded by Samuel Trotman; Hon. John Spencer
