= Edward Boscawen (disambiguation) =

Edward Boscawen (1711–1761) was a British Royal Navy admiral and MP for Truro.

Edward Boscawen may also refer to:

- Edward Boscawen (Truro MP, born 1628) (1628–1685), English landowner and MP for Truro, grandfather of the above
- Edward Boscawen, 1st Earl of Falmouth (1787–1841), English peer and MP for Truro, grandson of the admiral
