= Admiral Leveson =

Admiral Leveson may refer to:

- Arthur Leveson (1868–1929), British Royal Navy admiral
- Richard Leveson (admiral) (c. 1570–1605), English vice admiral
- John Leveson-Gower (Royal Navy officer)
- Edward Leveson-Gower
