= George Boscawen, 3rd Viscount Falmouth =

British army officer and statesman

Colonel The Right Honourable The Viscount Falmouth PC
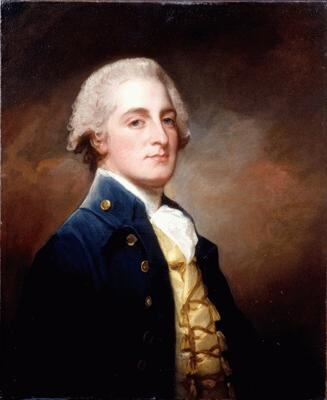
- George Boscawen in 1784 by George Romney
- Born: 6 May 1758; The Admiralty, Westminster
- Died: 11 May 1808 (aged 50); Penkivel, Cornwall
- Military career
- Allegiance: Kingdom of England; Kingdom of Great Britain
- Branch: Army
- Rank: Colonel
- Unit: Royal Horse Guards

George Boscawen, 3rd Viscount Falmouth, PC (6 May 1758 – 11 February 1808), was a British army officer and statesman in the late 18th and early 19th centuries. This included service as Captain of the Honourable Band of Gentlemen Pensioners in the reign of George III.

== Life and career ==
Boscawen was the third and youngest, but only surviving son of Admiral Edward Boscawen (1711–1761) by his marriage to Frances Glanville (1719–1805). In 1774 he joined the British Army as a cornet, but eventually reached the rank of colonel in 1795. Whilst serving as an officer he succeeded his uncle as Viscount Falmouth in 1782 and took his place in the House of Lords.

He was the chief justice in the Eyre North of Trent from 1789 to 1790, when he was raised to the position of Captain of the Honourable Band of Gentlemen Pensioners, serving in 1790–1806 and from 1807 until his death in 1808. At the same time, he was made a privy councillor.

== Family ==
On 29 June 1784, Falmouth married Elizabeth Anne Crew by special licence, as she was a minor at the time. They had three children:

- Edward Boscawen, 1st Earl of Falmouth (10 May 1787 – 29 December 1841)
- John Evelyn Boscawen (1790 – 12 April 1851), canon of Canterbury Cathedral
- Anne Evelyn Boscawen (23 November 1791 – 5 March 1871), wife of Sir George Warrender, 4th Baronet

Falmouth's wife died on 10 August 1793, and upon his own death in 1808, his estate and titles passed to his eldest son.

== In fiction ==
Named as Lord Falmouth, he is a recurring character in the Poldark novels by Winston Graham, where he is presented as the dominant political figure in Cornwall in his time, due to his unashamed use of patronage and his influence over Parliamentary elections. He appears personally a somewhat distant and arrogant man, but capable of kindness and acts of friendship.

In the 2015 BBC TV series based on the books, Lord Falmouth is played by James Wilby. In the series he has a beloved nephew, Hugh, who Poldark saves, along with 11 others, from imprisonment with the French. Sadly, Hugh would later succumb to an illness, possibly genetic, that had been made worse by his imprisonment. However, Falmouth still gives Poldark his political backing, as in his mind, Ross still gave him extra time with his nephew he wouldn't have had had Hugh never been rescued.

== Ancestry ==
Ancestors of George Boscawen, 3rd Viscount Falmouth

16. Hugh Boscawen
8. Edward Boscawen (MP)
4. Hugh Boscawen, 1st Viscount Falmouth
18. Francis Godolphin (1605–1667)
9. Jael Godolphin
19. Dorothy Berkeley
2. Admiral Rt. Hon. Edward Boscawen
10. Col. Charles Godfrey
5. Charlotte Godfrey
22. Winston Churchill (1620–1688)
11. Arabella Churchill
23. Elizabeth Drake
1. George Evelyn Boscawen, 3rd Viscount Falmouth
24. John Evelyn
12. George Evelyn, MP for Bletchingley
25. Tomasine Heynes
6. William Evelyn Glanville, High Sheriff of Kent
26. Andrew Broomhall
13. Frances Broomhall
3. Frances Evelyn Glanville
28. George Glanville
14. William Glanville, Barrister of Middle Temple
29. Jane Evelyn
7. Frances Glanville
30. Edward Hales
15. Frances Hales
31. Elizabeth Evelyn

Political offices
Preceded by The Earl of Leicester	Captain of the Honourable Band of Gentlemen Pensioners; 1790–1808	Succeeded by The Lord St John of Bletso
Legal offices
Preceded by Charles Wolfran Cornwall	Justice in Eyre north of the Trent; 1789–1790	Succeeded by The Earl of Clarendon
Peerage of Great Britain
Preceded by Hugh Boscawen	Viscount Falmouth; 1782–1808	Succeeded by Edward Boscawen
