= Thigpen =

Thigpen is a family name that may refer to:

- Ben Thigpen (1908–1971), American jazz drummer
- Corbett H. Thigpen (1919–1999), American psychiatrist
- Cressie Thigpen (born 1946), American jurist and lawyer
- Ed Thigpen (1930–2010), American jazz drummer
- Ivory Torrey Thigpen Jr., American politician
- Lynne Thigpen (1948–2003), American actress
- Owen Thigpen/Fitzpen/Phippen (1582–1636), English merchant
- Richard Ashley Thigpen (born 1943), American academic
- Anita Thigpen Perry (born 1952), First Lady of Texas

== Athletes ==
- Bobby Thigpen (born 1963), American baseball player
- Curtis Thigpen (born 1983), American baseball player
- J. H. Thigpen, American college football player
- Justus Thigpen (born 1947), American basketball player
- Marcus Thigpen (born 1986), American football player
- Tommy Thigpen (born 1971), American college football player and coach
- Tyler Thigpen, (born 1984) American football player
- Yancey Thigpen (born 1969), American football player
