= Listed buildings in Chattisham =

Civil Parish in Suffolk, England

Chattisham is a village and civil parish in the Babergh District of Suffolk, England. It contains nine listed buildings that are recorded in the National Heritage List for England. Of these one is grade II* and eight are grade II.

This list is based on the information retrieved online from Historic England.

== Key ==
Grade	Criteria
I	Buildings that are of exceptional interest
II*	Particularly important buildings of more than special interest
II	Buildings that are of special interest

== Listing ==
Name	Grade	Location	Type	Completed (Note: The date given is the date used by Historic England as significant for the initial building or that of an important part in the structure's description.)	Date designated	Grid ref. (Note: The grid reference is based on the British national grid reference system, sometimes known as OSGB36, used by the Ordnance Survey.) Geo-coordinates	Notes	Entry number (Note: The "List Entry Number" is a unique number assigned to each listed building and scheduled monument by Historic England.)	Image	Wikidata
Cartshed at Chattisham Place	II	Chattisham Road			22 February 1955	TM0923242071; 52°02′15″N 1°02′57″E		1351621	Upload Photo	Q26634706
Chattisham Place	II	Chattisham Road			22 February 1955	TM0920342112; 52°02′17″N 1°02′56″E		1036951	Upload Photo	Q26288624
Church of All Saints	II*	Chattisham Road	church building		22 February 1955	TM0922642150; 52°02′18″N 1°02′57″E		1351620	Church of All Saints More images	Q17534527
Church Farmhouse	II	Lower Barn Road			29 January 1988	TM0930242186; 52°02′19″N 1°03′01″E		1036952	Upload Photo	Q26288626
Old Mill Cottage	II	Lower Barn Road			29 January 1988	TM1008942954; 52°02′43″N 1°03′44″E		1193444	Upload Photo	Q26488104
Chattisham Hall	II	Mill Lane			29 January 1988	TM0872242374; 52°02′26″N 1°02′31″E		1193450	Upload Photo	Q26488110
Doves Cottage	II	Mill Lane			29 January 1988	TM0914342776; 52°02′38″N 1°02′54″E		1036953	Upload Photo	Q26288628
The Clayes	II	The Street			29 January 1988	TM0896142114; 52°02′17″N 1°02′43″E		1193456	Upload Photo	Q26488116
The Old Rectory	II	The Street			29 January 1988	TM0913942198; 52°02′19″N 1°02′52″E		1351622	Upload Photo	Q26634707

== See also ==
- Grade I listed buildings in Suffolk
- Grade II* listed buildings in Suffolk

== Sources ==
- Bettely, James; Pevsner, Nikolaus (2015) [1961], Suffolk: West, The Buildings of England, New Haven and London: Yale University Press, ISBN 978-0-300-19655-9
