= John Lemon =

British politician

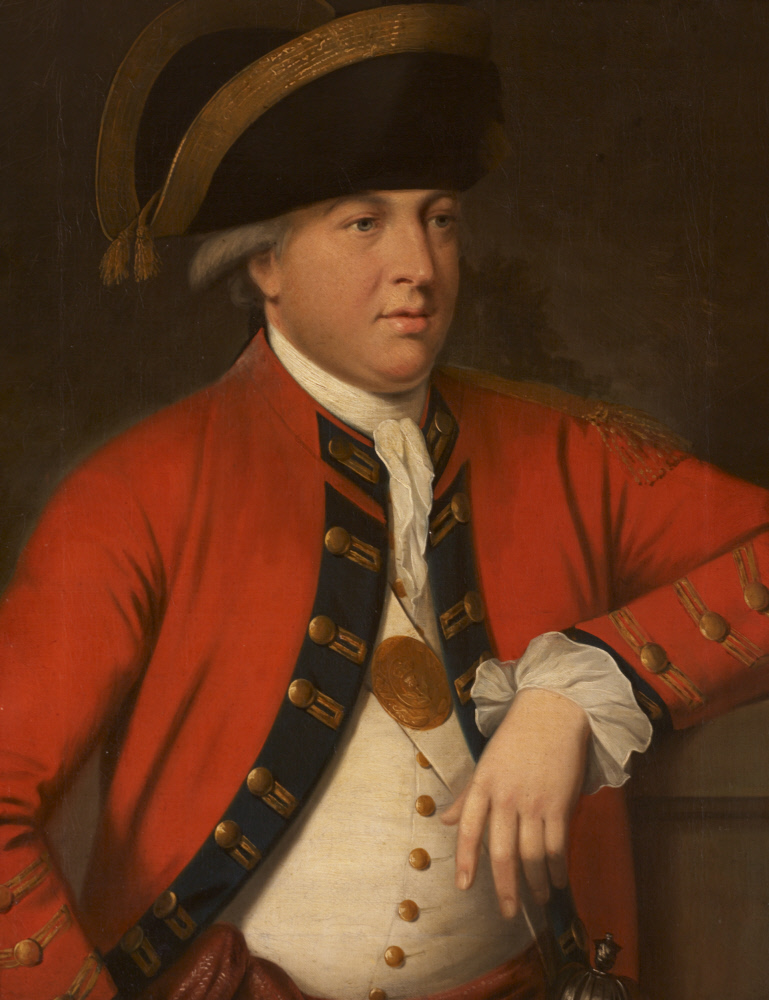

Member of the British Parliament for West Looe
- In office 1784

Member of the British Parliament for Saltash
- In office 1787–1790

Member of the British Parliament for Truro
- In office 1796–1814

Personal details
- Born: 6 November 1754
- Died: 5 April 1814 (aged 59)

Military service
- Rank: Lieutenant Colonel
- Unit: Horse Guards

John Lemon (6 November 1754 – 5 April 1814) was a British Whig Member of Parliament.

He was born in Truro, the second son of William Lemon by his marriage to Anne, the daughter of John Willyams of Carnanton House, and was the grandson of William Lemon the Elder (1696–1760), who had acquired a substantial estate at Carclew in 1749, and the younger brother of Sir William Lemon, 1st Baronet.

The young John Lemon was educated at Truro Grammar School and later at Harrow. He became a lieutenant colonel in the Horse Guards.

On 5 April 1814, he died unmarried in Polvellen, Cornwall.

== Political career ==
In 1784 he was elected to the House of Commons for West Looe, a seat he held only briefly. He returned to the Commons as a member for Saltash between 1787 and 1790. In 1796 he was able to buy from Viscount Falmouth a life interest in one of the seats at the pocket borough of Truro and was duly elected for Truro that year, holding the seat until his death in 1814.

On 17 January 1804 Lemon was appointed as one of the Lords Commissioners of the Admiralty, serving for only a month. According to convention, this meant he had to give up his Parliamentary seat on appointment to the Crown Office and seek re-election to his seat at a by-election in February, at which he was re-elected.

== Amateur musician and composer ==
Lemon was an amateur musician and composer. The Cathedral Psalter Chants (1874) included his Double Chant in G, while there is also a Chant in D. A Double Chant in F is in The Parish Psalter with Chants (1932).

Parliament of Great Britain
Preceded by John Somers Cocks; John Buller	Member of Parliament for West Looe; April 1784 – August 1784; With: John Scott	Succeeded by John Scott; James Adams
Preceded by Charles Ambler; Earl of Mornington	Member of Parliament for Saltash; 7 May 1787 – 1790; With: Charles Ambler	Succeeded by Edward Bearcroft; Viscount Garlies
Preceded by Charles Paulet; James Gordon	Member of Parliament for Truro; 1796–1801; With: John Leveson-Gower 1796–1801	Succeeded by Parliament of the United Kingdom
Parliament of the United Kingdom
Preceded by Parliament of Great Britain	Member of Parliament for Truro; 1801 – 5 April 1814 (death); With: John Leveson-Gower 1801–02; Edward Leveson-Gower 1802–07; Edward Boscawen 1807–08; Charles Powlett Townshend 1808–10; William John Bankes 1810–12; Sir George Warrender, Bt 1812–14	Succeeded by Sir George Warrender, Bt; George Dashwood
