= Samuel Trotman =

Samuel Trotman may refer to:

- Samuel Trotman (1650–1720), member of parliament for Bath
- Samuel Trotman (1686–1748), member of parliament for Woodstock
