= Kelland Courtenay =

British politician

Member of the Great Britain Parliament for Truro
- In office 1734–1741 Serving with Robert Trefusis
- Preceded by: Hugh Boscawen; Sidney Meadows
- Succeeded by: Charles Hamilton; James Hammond

Member of the Great Britain Parliament for Huntingdon
- In office 1747–1748 Serving with Edward Montagu
- Preceded by: Edward Montagu; Albert Nesbitt
- Succeeded by: Edward Montagu; John Montagu

Personal details
- Born: c.1707
- Died: 4 March 1748
- Resting place: Ashprington
- Spouse: Elizabeth Montagu
- Parents: William Courtenay; Susannah Kelland

Kelland Courtenay (c.1707–1748), of Painsford in Devon and Tremere and Trethurfe in Cornwall, was a British politician who represented the constituencies of Truro (1734–1741) and Huntingdon (1747–1748) in the Parliament of Great Britain.

== Family ==
Courtenay was the son of William Courtenay and Susannah Kelland daughter of John Kelland of Painsford, she was heir to her nephew, his paternal grandparents were Humphrey and Alice Courtenay who were distant cousins, Alice was the daughter of Peter Courtenay of Trethurfe and heir to her brother, both Alice and Humphrey were male-line descendants of the Earls of Devon.

Courtenay married on the 1 September 1737, Elizabeth Montagu daughter of Edward Montagu granddaughter of Edward Montagu, 3rd Earl of Sandwich and sister of John Montagu, 4th Earl of Sandwich, they had three children:

- Capt. Charles Kelland Courtenay, he was killed in Germany in 1761, during the Seven Years' War, he was serving under Sir David Cunningham, he died unmarried
- Isabella Courtenay (1742-1805), married William Poyntz they were the parents of William Stephen Poyntz
- Anne Courtenay (1743-1785), married Edmund Boyle, 7th Earl of Cork, the marriage was dissolved in 1782

Courtenay died in 1748 and was buried at Ashprington on the 8 March 1748, Charles inherited his estate but died unmarried so his sisters became co-heiresses of his estate.
