= Owen Fitzpen =

English merchant c. 1852 – 1636)

- Born: c. 1582; Melcombe Regis, Dorset, England
- Died: 17 March 1636 (aged 54); Lamorran, Cornwall, England
- Other name: Owen Phippen
- Occupation: Merchant
- Known for: Escape from enslavement in Algiers
- Spouse: Annie Coinie (m. 1603)
- Children: 3

Owen Fitzpen (c. 1852–1636), also known as Owen Phippen, was an English merchant who was captured by Barbary pirates and enslaved in Algiers. After seven years in captivity, he and a group of other Christian captives seized the ship on which they were being transported and sailed it to Cartagena, Spain. A memorial to him was later erected in St Mary's Church, Truro, Cornwall.

== Biography ==
=== Early life ===
Fitzpen was born in Melcombe Regis, Dorset, in 1582. He was the son of Robert Fitzpen (1555–1589) and Cecily Jordon (born 1559). His father died when Fitzpen was about seven years old.

Fitzpen later became a merchant seaman. He married Annie Coinie on 3 July 1603.

His brother George became master of Truro Grammar School from 1621 to 1635 and later rector of St Mary's Church in Truro. Another brother, David, emigrated to Hingham, Massachusetts.

=== Capture and escape ===
On 24 March 1620, Fitzpen was captured during a trading voyage in the Mediterranean Sea and taken to Algiers, where he was held in slavery for seven years.

On 17 June 1627, Fitzpen and ten other Christian captives, described as Dutch and French, were aboard a corsair vessel with 65 Turks. The captives fought the crew for about three hours. Five of the captives were killed before Fitzpen and the surviving captives took control of the ship. They sailed it to Cartagena, Spain.

Fitzpen was subsequently summoned to Madrid, where the king offered him a captaincy and royal favour if he converted to Catholicism. Fitzpen declined. He later sold the ship for £6,000 and returned to England.

He died at Lamorran, Cornwall, on 17 March 1636, aged 54. His brother George later had a memorial erected to him in St Mary's Church, Truro.

== Memorial inscription ==
The memorial inscription records Fitzpen's capture, enslavement and escape. It states:

To the pious and well-deserved memory of Owen Fitz-Pen, alias Phippen, who travelled over many parts of the world, and on the 24 Mar., 1620, was taken by the Turkes and made captive in Argier. He projected sundry plots for his libertie and on the 17 of June 1627 with ten other Christian captives, Dutch and French [perswaded by his counsel and courage] he began a cruel fight with sixty-five Turkes in their owne ship, which lasted three howers; in which five of his company were slaine, yet God made him conquer, and so he brought the ship into Cartagene, being of 400 tons and 22 ord.

The King sent for him to Madrid to see him; he was proffered a captaines place and the Kings favor if he would turne Papist, which he refused. He sold all for 6,000£ returned into England, and died at Lamorran 17 March 1636.

Melcombe in Dorset, was his place of birth,

Age 54, and here lies earth to earth.

A copy of the inscription appears in Lysons' Magna Britannia, volume III, Cornwall, p. 312; Hitchins' Cornwall, volume II, p. 648; and Orchard's Epitaphs.

== Family ==
Fitzpen and his wife, Annie, are said to have had at least three children born in Ireland before his capture. One son is said to have adopted the surname Thigpen.

The family name also appears in the form Phippen. Fitzpen's brother David emigrated to the Massachusetts Bay Colony, and a number of his descendants later served in the American Revolutionary War.

== See also ==
- List of slaves
