= John Spencer (British politician) =

British politician, an ancestor of the Earls Spencer (1708–1746)

The Honourable John Spencer
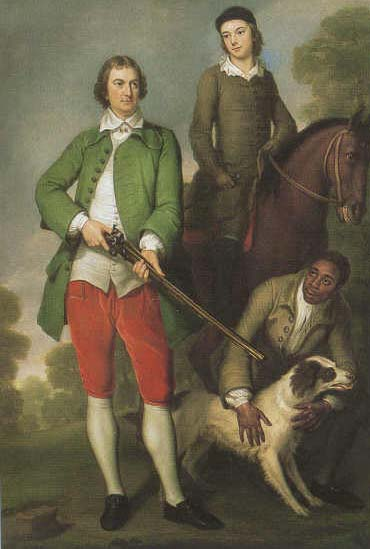
- John Spencer, his son and a servant, Caesar Shaw

Member of Parliament for Woodstock
- In office 1732–1746 Serving with Samuel Trotman 1732–1734; James Dawkins 1734–1746
- Preceded by: Samuel Trotman; Marquess of Blandford
- Succeeded by: James Dawkins; John Trevor

Personal details
- Born: 13 May 1708
- Died: 19 June 1746 (aged 38)
- Spouse: Georgiana Caroline Carteret
- Children: 2 (including John Spencer, 1st Earl Spencer)
- Parent(s): Charles Spencer, 3rd Earl of Sunderland; Lady Anne Churchill
- Occupation: Politician

John Spencer (13 May 1708 – 19 June 1746) was an English politician who sat in the House of Commons from 1732 to 1746.

== Early life ==
Spencer was born on 13 May 1708 and was the youngest son of the 3rd Earl of Sunderland, the First Lord of the Treasury and Lord President of the Council under George I, and his second wife, Lady Anne Churchill, who served as Lady of the Bedchamber to Queen Anne from 1702 to 1712. From his father's first marriage to Lady Arabella Cavendish, daughter of the 2nd Duke of Newcastle, he was a half brother to Lady Frances Spencer, the wife of the 4th Earl of Carlisle. From his parents' marriage, his older full siblings were: Robert Spencer, who died young; Robert Spencer, 4th Earl of Sunderland; Lady Anne Spencer, who married Viscount Bateman; Charles Spencer, 5th Earl of Sunderland, who succeeded their aunt, Henrietta Godolphin, 2nd Duchess of Marlborough, as 3rd Duke of Marlborough. His younger sister, Lady Diana Spencer, married the 4th Duke of Bedford.

His paternal grandparents were Robert Spencer, 2nd Earl of Sunderland, and Lady Anne Digby, daughter of George Digby, 2nd Earl of Bristol. His mother was the third daughter of John Churchill, 1st Duke of Marlborough, and Sarah Churchill, Duchess of Marlborough.

Spencer was only seven when his mother died, and he was brought up by his grandmother Sarah, Duchess of Marlborough. He was educated at Eton College in about 1722, and he undertook a Grand Tour through France, Switzerland and Italy between 1725 and 1727. His grandmother determined on a political career for him.

== Career ==
In 1732, Spencer succeeded his cousin, William Godolphin, Marquess of Blandford, as Member of Parliament (MP) for Woodstock, a seat he held until 1746. He was involved in the foundation of the Foundling Hospital, famously championed by Thomas Coram, William Hogarth and others. Spencer is listed alongside these gentlemen as one of the organisation's founding governors.

In mid-January 1734, Spencer inherited his father's family's estates in Bedfordshire, Northamptonshire (including Althorp) and Warwickshire and his grandmother, the Duchess of Marlborough's property, including Wimbledon Park.

== Personal life ==
On 14 February 1734, a month after inheriting his family's estates, he married Georgiana Caroline Carteret (the third daughter and co-heir of Viscount Carteret, later Earl Granville). The couple were the parents of two children, one son and one daughter:

- John Spencer, who was later created Earl Spencer in 1765.
- Diana Spencer, who died at eight years old.

Spencer died in 1746, three years after their daughter. After his death, his widow remarried four years later to the 2nd Earl Cowper. The Althorp estate remains the seat of the earls, but the Wimbledon estate was later sold by the 4th Earl in 1846.

== Ancestry ==
Ancestors of John Spencer (British politician)

16. William Spencer, 2nd Baron Spencer of Wormleighton
8. Henry Spencer, 1st Earl of Sunderland
17. Lady Penelope Wriothesley
4. Robert Spencer, 2nd Earl of Sunderland
18. Robert Sidney, 2nd Earl of Leicester
9. Lady Dorothy Sidney
19. Lady Dorothy Percy
2. Charles Spencer, 3rd Earl of Sunderland
20. John Digby, 1st Earl of Bristol
10. George Digby, 2nd Earl of Bristol
21. Beatrice Walcott
5. Lady Anne Digby
22. Francis Russell, 4th Earl of Bedford
11. Lady Anne Russell
23. The Hon. Catherine Brydges
1. Hon. John Spencer
24. Sir John Churchill
12. Sir Winston Churchill
25. Sarah Winston
6. John Churchill, 1st Duke of Marlborough
26. Sir John Drake
13. Elizabeth Drake
27. Hon. Eleanor Boteler
3. Lady Anne Churchill
28. Sir John Jennings
14. Sir Richard Jennings
29. Alice Spencer
7. Sarah Jennings
30. Sir Gifford Thornhurst, 1st Baronet
15. Frances Thornhurst
31. Susanna Temple

Parliament of Great Britain
Preceded by Samuel Trotman and Marquess of Blandford	Member of Parliament for Woodstock; 1732–1746; With: Samuel Trotman 1732–1734; James Dawkins 1734–1746	Succeeded by James Dawkins and John Trevor
Honorary titles
Preceded by The Duchess of Marlborough	Ranger of Windsor Great Park; 1744–1746	Succeeded by The Duke of Cumberland
