= Philip Meadows (died 1718) =

English diplomat and ambassador to Oliver Cromwell

Sir Philip Meadows (1626–1718) was an English diplomat and official, an ambassador for Oliver Cromwell.

== Life ==
He was the fifth son of Daniel Meadowe or Meadows (1571–1651) of Chattisham, and his wife Elizabeth, and was educated at Emmanuel College, Cambridge, graduating B.A. there in 1646. He took his M.A. in 1649 at Queens' College, where he was a Fellow. In October 1653 he was appointed, on John Thurloe's recommendation, Latin secretary to Cromwell's Council of State. The appointment was made for the benefit of John Milton, who was losing his sight (and who would have preferred Andrew Marvell). Meadows took on the bulk of the routine work in the department.

In March 1656 Meadows was chosen to represent the Lord Protector at Lisbon, for the ratification of the treaty between England and Portugal. He returned towards the end of November. In February 1657 he was chosen as envoy to Frederick III of Denmark. He sailed in the Assistance in August 1657. In March 1658 he gave an account to Thurloe of the Treaty of Roskilde (8 March) between Denmark and Sweden; Cromwell wanted protect Denmark's interests. Meadows had an interview with Charles X of Sweden after the treaty. Meadows was sent on to take part as a mediator in negotiations between the kings of Sweden and Poland, but shortly gave up the task. He was knighted, and went to the Swedish court in 1658, but on a fruitless mission.

After the English Restoration of 1660, Meadows retired from public life, but was once more knighted, by Charles II in 1662. The Glorious Revolution of 1688 brought him back to prominence, and he held official positions from 1692 to 1715.

In 1717, Sir Philip was visited by his newly-wed nephew and namesake, Philip Meadows (1679–1752) — later Mayor of Norwich (1734) — who ran upstairs to Sir Philip's observatory where he was able to further study "the vexed problem of the longitude".

== Works ==
Meadows published:

- A Narrative of the Principal Actions occurring in the Wars betwixt Sueden and Denmark before and after the Roschild Treaty, with the Counsels and Measures by which those actions were directed, together with a View of the Suedish and other Affairs as they stood in Germany in the year 1675, with relation to England (1677), dedicated to the Earl of Bristol.
- A Brief Enquiry into Leagues and Confederacies made betwixt Princes and Nations, with the Nature of their Obligations (1681).
- Observations concerning the Dominion and Sovereignty of the Seas, being an Abstract of the Marine Affairs of England (1689). It accepted the general conclusions of John Selden's Mare Clausum, but decries a policy of encroachment.

== Family ==
Meadows married, in April 1661, Constance, second daughter and coheiress of Francis Lucy of Westminster. They had a son and three daughters, including Elizabeth who married Sir Thomas Powys. A second daughter married Richard Dyott, commissioner of stamp duties from 1708 to 1710, convicted of fraud. The son, Sir Philip Meadows (1672–1757), was a commissioner of excise from 1698 to 1700, was on 2 July 1700 appointed Knight Marshal of the king's household. He was a diplomat and Member of Parliament.
