= Edward Leveson-Gower =

British naval officer (1776–1853)

Rear-Admiral Edward Leveson-Gower
- Born: 8 May 1776
- Died: 6 December 1853 (aged 77)
- Relatives: John Leveson-Gower, 1st Earl Gower (grandfather); Admiral John Leveson-Gower (father); Granville Leveson-Gower, 1st Marquess of Stafford (half-uncle); George Boscawen, 3rd Viscount Falmouth (uncle)
- Military career
- Allegiance: Great Britain; United Kingdom
- Branch: Royal Navy
- Service years: 1791–1821
- Rank: Rear-Admiral
- Commands: HMS Prompte; HMS Castor; HMS Pomone; HMS Shannon; HMS Elizabeth
- Conflicts: French Revolutionary Wars; Napoleonic Wars

Rear-Admiral Edward Leveson-Gower (8 May 1776 – 6 December 1853) was a British naval officer, the son of Admiral The Hon. John Leveson-Gower and Frances Boscawen.

== Naval and political career ==
Leveson-Gower entered the Navy in 1791, and was promoted to lieutenant on 19 March 1793. He took command of the sixth-rate prize frigate Prompte, when he was made post-captain on 1 June 1795, commanding her only until 6 February 1796. He commanded the frigate Castor from December 1798, until appointed to Pomone in January 1801. In her he took part in the capture of Carrere on 3 August 1801, and the destruction of Bravoure and the recapture of Success on 2 September 1801, before she struck a rock off St Aubin's Bay and sank on 23 September 1801.

Leveson-Gower was returned as the Member of Parliament for Truro through the influence of his uncle Viscount Falmouth in July 1802.

He was given command of the frigate Shannon upon her launch in September 1803. While attached to the Channel Fleet, Shannon was lost on 10 December 1803 when she ran aground in a gale off Barfleur. Leveson-Gower was captured and spent over three years as a prisoner of war before returning to England, where he was honourably acquitted by a court martial for the loss of his ship.

He was returned for Truro in the election of November 1806, and for Mitchell in May 1807 by Viscount Falmouth, in the Government interest, but resigned the seat shortly afterwards, taking the Chiltern Hundreds in July. Leveson-Gower commanded Elizabeth from 1811, and was serving in the Adriatic in 1813, when in late April, the boats of Elizabeth and Eagle attacked a convoy of seven merchant vessels off the River Po, capturing four, and driving the other three ashore. Of these one was brought off and another destroyed, while under fire from a shore battery, two schooners and three gun-boats.

Leveson-Gower was promoted to rear admiral in 1814 and resigned his commission in 1821.

== Personal life ==
On 13 November 1822, he married Charlotte Elizabeth Mount, by whom he had two daughters:

- Elizabeth Leveson-Gower (13 April 1824 – 4 April 1875), married Charles Patton Keele
- Frances Charlotte Leveson-Gower (13 December 1825 – 18 March 1915), married Georges-Xavier Papillon de la Ferté, Vicomte Papillon de la Ferté (grandson of Denis-Pierre-Jean Papillon de la Ferté)

Parliament of the United Kingdom
Preceded by John Leveson-Gower; John Lemon	Member of Parliament for Truro; 1802–1807; With: John Lemon	Succeeded by John Lemon; Edward Boscawen
Preceded by Sir Arthur Wellesley; Henry Conyngham Montgomery	Member of Parliament for Mitchell; 1807–1807; With: George Galway Mills	Succeeded by George Galway Mills; Sir James Hall
