= Lamorran =

Village in Cornwall, England

Coordinates: 50.24165°N 4.97462°W

Lamorran: Cornish: Lannvoren
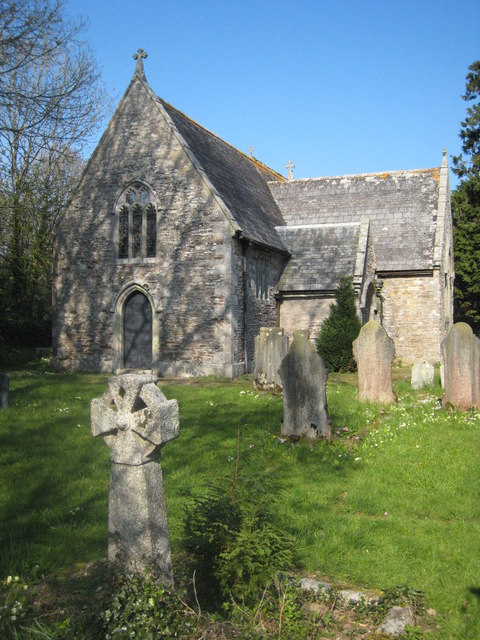
- Lamorran church

- Location within Cornwall
- Civil parish: St Michael Penkevil
- Unitary authority: Cornwall
- Shire county: Cornwall
- Region: South West
- Country: England
- Sovereign state: United Kingdom

Lamorran (Cornish: Lannvoren) is a village and former civil parish, now in the parish of St Michael Penkevil, in the Cornwall district, in the ceremonial county of Cornwall, England. Lamorran lies 3 1/2 miles (5.6 km) southeast of Truro, within the Cornwall Area of Outstanding Natural Beauty (AONB). In 1931 the parish had a population of 49.

Lamorran church was built in the mid-13th century and has never been enlarged. It was dedicated (to St Morenna) in 1261 and restored unsympathetically in 1845 (by William White) and 1853 (for Lord Falmouth; Evelyn Boscawen, 6th Viscount Falmouth (1819–1889)). The tower is separate from the church and the font of Catacleuse stone may be Norman (or 15th century work in the Norman style).

A large monument of 1658 commemorates John Verman and his wife. The churchyard cross is a fine example of a Gothic stone cross. This cross is made of Pentewan stone; the crosshead is now incomplete as the upper limb is missing.

Lamorran was an ancient parish, and became a civil parish in 1866. The civil parish was abolished on 1 April 1934 and absorbed into the civil parish of St Michael Penkevil. For ecclesiastical purposes the parish is now united with Merther to form the parish of Lamorran and Merther.

== Notable residents ==
- Owen Fitzpen (1580-1636) a merchant taken captive by Barbary pirates and sold into slavery. Seven years later, he later mounted a heroic escape and on return home lived at Lamorran.
- William Hals (1655–1737), a Cornish historian; he compiled a History of Cornwall, the first work of any magnitude that was printed in Cornwall. He was born in the parish of Merther.
- Rear-Admiral Robert Carthew Reynolds (1745–1811), naval commander with a long and distinguished career in the Royal Navy.
