= Philip Meadowes =

English diplomat and politician (1672–1757)

Sir Philip Meadowes or Meadows (1672–1757) was an English politician and diplomat.

== Early life ==
He was baptised on 21 May 1672, the second son of Sir Philip Meadows of Chattisham, Suffolk, and his wife Constance Lucy. He studied at Trinity College, Oxford, matriculating 1689, and at Lincoln's Inn, which he entered in 1690.

== Family and career ==
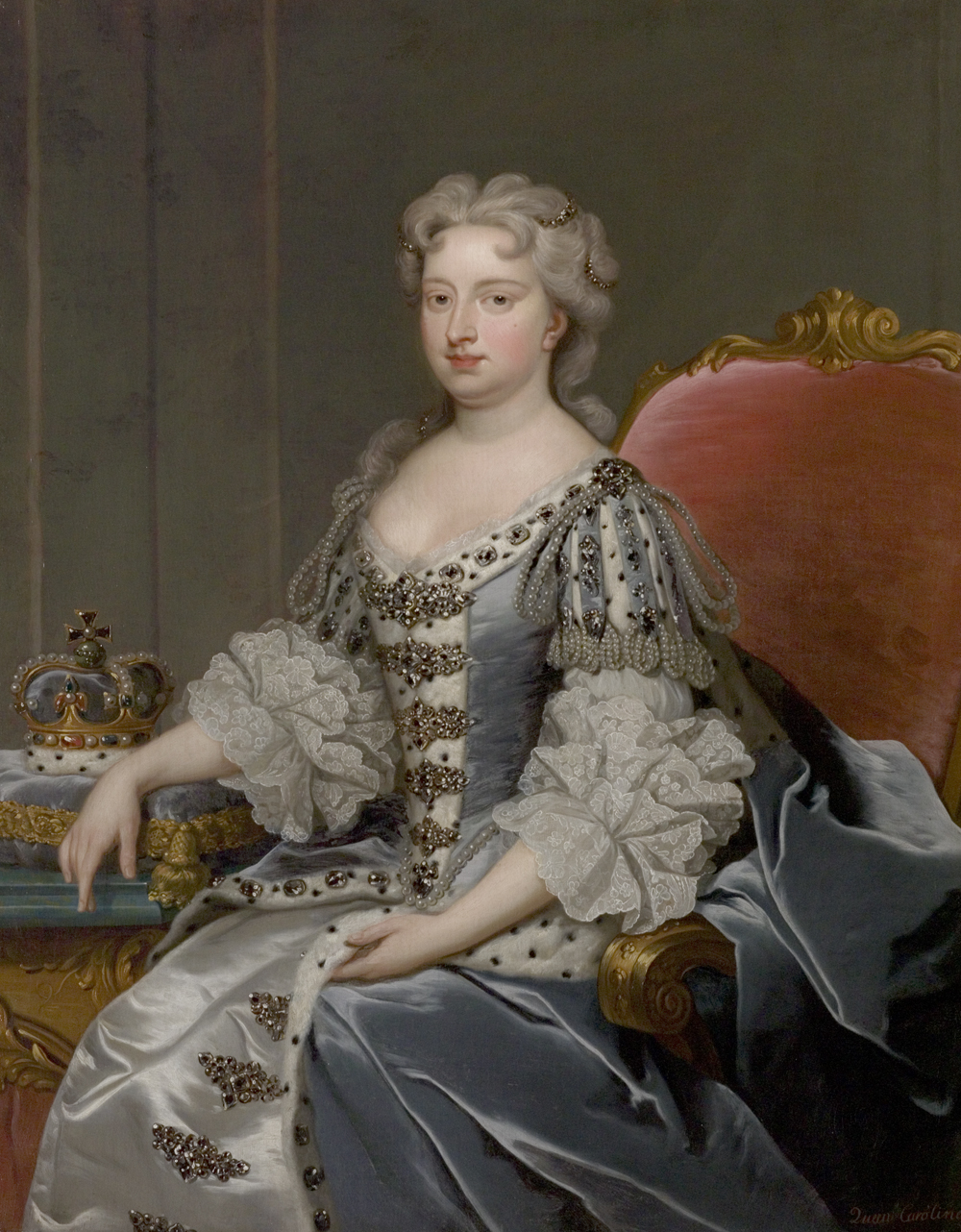
Sir Philip's daughter, Mary, was maid of honour to Queen Caroline.

Meadowes entered parliament as member for Tregony in 1698. He was a commissioner of excise from 1698 to 1700. He was on 2 July 1700 appointed Knight Marshal of the king's household, and was knighted by William III on 23 December 1700 at Hampton Court. His position as Knight Marshal was bought from Lord Jersey. He returned to parliament as member for Truro in 1702, and was elected again for Tregony in 1705.

In December 1706 Meadowes succeeded James Stanhope as envoy to Holland. He was in 1707 despatched on a special mission to Emperor Joseph I, and during his absence was appointed controller of army accounts; in November 1708 he presented a memorial to the Emperor in favour of the Protestants of Silesia. He was succeeded by Lord Raby in August 1709.

Sir Philip's daughter, Mary, was a maid of honour to Queen Caroline at the court of King George II. Caroline had died in 1737, the year her "character" was described in "affectionate and humorous correspondence" between Mary's second cousin, attorney Philip Meadows, Lord of the manor of Diss (1719–1783), and his "future brother-in-law" Richard Taylor (1719–1763). Philip Meadows' father, Philip Meadows (1679–1752), was Sheriff of Norwich in 1724 and Mayor of Norwich in 1734.

Sir Philip married Dorothy Boscawen, sister of Hugh Boscawen, 1st Viscount Falmouth. The wife of Sir Philip's nephew – the Hon. Admiral Edward Boscawen – was the Hon. Mrs Boscawen (1719–1805), a prominent member of the Blue Stockings Society. Also a member of the society was Sir Leonard Smelt who, like Meadows, had been a member of the court of King George II in 1720 when Meadows held the position of 'Comptroller of the Accounts of the Army' and Smelt held the position of 'Commissioner for Taking, Stating and Examining Debts Due to the Army'. In 1781, Smelt became Deputy Ranger of Richmond Park following the death that year of Sir Philip's son, Philip, who had held that position.

Sir Philip and Lady Meadows had three sons and five daughters, including:

- Sidney (1699–1792)
- Philip (1708–1781)
- Mary Meadows (1713–43)

Sir Philip later resided at Richmond, Surrey. He died at Brompton on 5 December 1757.
