= Merther =

Hamlet in Cornwall, England

Coordinates: 50.2639°N 5.0001°W

Merther: Cornish: Eglosverther
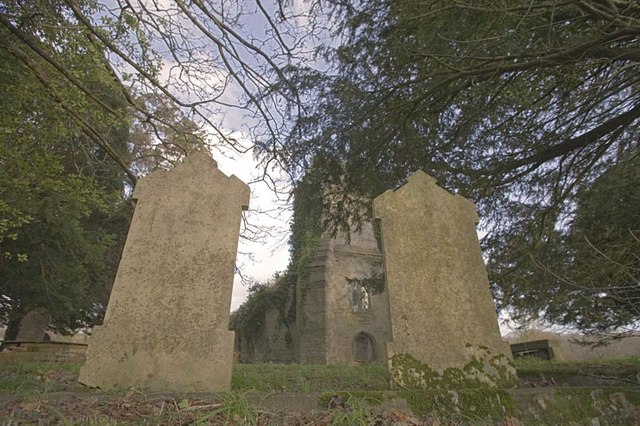
- Merther Church

- Location within Cornwall
- OS grid reference: SW862447
- Civil parish: St Michael Penkevil
- Unitary authority: Cornwall
- Ceremonial county: Cornwall
- Region: South West
- Country: England
- Sovereign state: United Kingdom
- Post town: TRURO
- Postcode district: TR
- Police: Devon and Cornwall
- Fire: Cornwall
- Ambulance: South Western

Merther (Cornish: Eglosverther, meaning martyr's church) is a small hamlet and former civil parish, now in the parish of St Michael Penkevil, in the Cornwall district, in the ceremonial county of Cornwall, England. It lies 2 miles (3 km) east of Truro, on the eastern side of the Tresillian River. In 1931 the parish had a population of 150. It was formerly the churchtown of the small parish of Merther, and also the site of a manor house and medieval chapel dedicated to St Cohan (also spelt Coan). The former parish church is now in ruins.

St Coan was a martyr; there were formerly at Merther a chapel and holy well dedicated to him. A new church was built at Tresillian Bridge in 1904 (the font, bells, statue of St Anthony and pulpit from Merther were moved to the new church). The church was abandoned in the mid-20th century.

== Geography ==
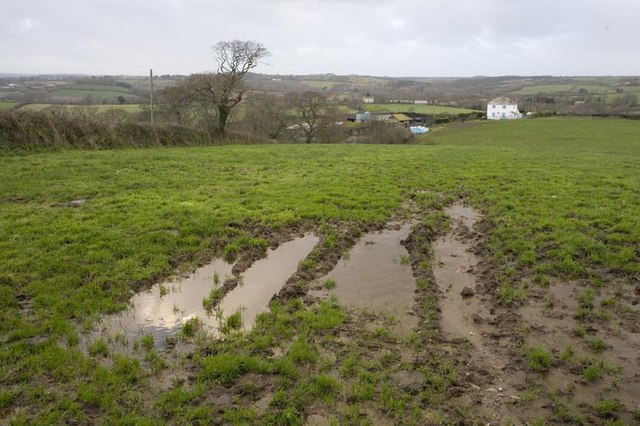
Tresawsan Farm

Merther (altitude:39 metres (128 ft)) is 200 metres (660 ft) from the eastern bank of the tidal, Treslllian River, a tributary of the Truro River which flows into the River Fal. It is 3 kilometres (1.9 mi) via the modern tarmac road to Tresillian Church (which replaced St Cohan's) and the A390 road, which connects Truro and St Austell. There is a shorter route to Tresillian Church, by foot via the farm at Treffry. The former churchtown now consists of Eglosmertha, School Cottage, Rectory Cottage, Penhale and a ruined church and churchyard.

Tresawsan is a hamlet in the former parish of Merther; the meaning of Tresawsan is "Englishmen's farm". The historian William Hals was born at Tresawsan.

== History ==
Eglosmerther is a Grade II listed building on the site of a manor house, and the barton was held in 1311 by the Reskymers. It is now a farm, and the farmhouse including the courtyard wall, was a rebuild in 1806–8 of an earlier house.

East of the parish church, in a field called St Coan (grid reference SW866448) which is the site of St Cohan's Chapel and well. By 1480 Cohan was regarded as a martyr and patron-saint of Merther. He may have been killed near here during the invasion of Cornwall by King Athelstan although there is no evidence that he was buried locally. His chapel was destroyed in about 1750 and by 1860 the last stones removed. An effigy of St Anthony probably from the 15th-century was moved to Merther Church.

The ruin of St Cohan's church is grade II listed and was built of slatestone walls with granite dressing. Dating from the 13th-century onwards it has a nave, chancel, west tower, south aisle and south porch. Said to be neglected in 1970, the church is now roofless and overgrown with vegetation. Until 1866, Merther was a chapelry to Probus, 5 kilometres (3.1 mi) to the north-east; it then became a civil parish. The ecclesiastical parish was combined with Lamorran in 1900 to form the parish of Lamorran and Merther, and the civil parish was abolished on 1 April 1934 and absorbed into the civil parish of St Michael Penkevil. In 1904 a more conveniently positioned church, at Tresillian Bridge was enlarged. The 12th-century Pentewan stone font, 17th-century polygonal oak pulpit and bells were removed to the new church, and St Cohan's became a mortuary chapel.
