= Hugh Boscawen, 2nd Viscount Falmouth =

British soldier and politician

Arms of Boscawen: Ermine, a rose gules barbed and seeded proper

General Hugh Boscawen, 2nd Viscount Falmouth, PC (20 March 1707 – 4 February 1782), styled The Honourable Hugh Boscawen between 1720 and 1734, was a British soldier and politician.

Boscawen was the eldest son of Hugh Boscawen, 1st Viscount Falmouth, by Charlotte Godfrey, daughter of Colonel Charles Godfrey, Master of Jewel Office, by Arabella Churchill, daughter of Sir Winston Churchill and sister of the Duke of Marlborough. Admiral Edward Boscawen was his younger brother. He was returned to Parliament for Truro in 1727, a seat he held until 1734, when he succeeded his father in the viscountcy. In 1747 he was appointed Captain of the Yeomen of the Guard, a post he held until his death 35 years later. He was sworn of the Privy Council in 1756. He also served in the British Army. He became a lieutenant-general in 1759 and a full general in 1772. From 1761 to 1782 he was Vice-Admiral of Cornwall.

Lord Falmouth married Hannah Catherine Maria Smith, daughter of Thomas Smith, of Worplesdon, Surrey, and widow of Richard Russel, in 1736. There were no children from the marriage. Falmouth died in February 1782, aged 74, and was succeeded in the title by his nephew, George.

He had no children in his marriage, but a family of three outside it: Hugh, Jane and Florentius (male) - apparently born in the 1750s. Lord Falmouth, was, it is understood, to have been very proud of his children and a wise, generous and devoted father. Only Hugh appears in the Boscawen tree, but he appears as the second son of his Uncle John. Hugh reached the rank and position of Knight Marshall and had four children.

"EXTRACT: Will of Hugh Boscawen, 2nd viscount Falmouth Dated 27 July 1778 “Whereas I have adopted Hugh Boscawen Esq. some time since (Clerk) of the (Cheque) of His Majesty’s Guard of Yeoman of the Guard and now (?Member) of Parliament for the Borough of St. Mawes in the County of Cornwall and given him a qualification to sit in Parliament and his brother Florentius Boscawen now a Lieutenant in his Majesty’s Third Regiment of Foot Guards and their sister Jane Boscawen late a Parlour Boarder at Blacklands School of Chelsea afterwards living with Lady Leith and now with Mrs. Hawksworth of Bromley Kent as my sons and daughter and given and directed them to take and use my name and Arms (the Arms of Boscawen) without any alteration or addition I also give my said adopted sons and daughter the said Hugh Jane and Florentius thirty thousand pounds stirling that is to say ten thousand pounds each to my said son Hugh Boscawen and daughter Jane ………..” [he then goes on to make special arrangements for payments to Florentius until he reaches the age of 21]. At different places in the Will later, he asks his wife, his trustees and his friends to ‘countenance’ his children.

Parliament of Great Britain
Preceded by Spencer Cowper; Thomas Wyndham	Member of Parliament for Truro; 1727–1734; With: Sidney Meadows	Succeeded by Kelland Courtenay; Robert Trefusis
Political offices
Preceded by The Viscount Torrington	Captain of the Yeomen of the Guard; 1747–1782	Succeeded by The Duke of Dorset
Honorary titles
Preceded by Edward Boscawen	Vice-Admiral of Cornwall; 1761–1782	Succeeded by The Viscount Mount Edgcumbe and Valletort
Peerage of Great Britain
Preceded by Hugh Boscawen	Viscount Falmouth; 1734–1782	Succeeded by George Evelyn Boscawen
