= James Dawkins (MP, died 1766) =

James Dawkins (c. 1696–1766) was an English landowner and politician.

== Life ==
He was the second son of Colonel Richard Dawkins of Clarendon, a plantation and slave owner in Jamaica, member of the Assembly (died c. 1698/1701/1705, of a Leicestershire family), and his second wife Mrs. Elizabeth Masters (d. 1702). He matriculated at Magdalen College, Oxford on 28 March 1713, at age 16.

Dawkins, of Rusley Park, Bishopstone, Wiltshire, bought land at Over Norton in Oxfordshire, the Busby estate. In the general election of 1734 he campaigned to become Member of Parliament for Oxford, but withdrew before the poll, despite having spent heavily. He was brought in unopposed, however, for New Woodstock, with the support of the Duchess of Marlborough. In 1747 he lost his seat, to John Bateman, 2nd Viscount Bateman, who was backed by Charles Spencer, 3rd Duke of Marlborough.

In the 1750s, Dawkins was considered a Jacobite. He died unmarried on 10 May 1766. His Over Norton Park estate went to Henry Dawkins, his nephew.

== Notes ==
Parliament of Great Britain
| Preceded by Samuel Trotman; John Spencer | Member of Parliament for Woodstock; 1734–1747; With: John Spencer 1734–1746; John Trevor 1746–1747 | Succeeded by John Bateman; John Trevor |
