= William John Bankes =

British politician (1786–1855)

William John Bankes FRS
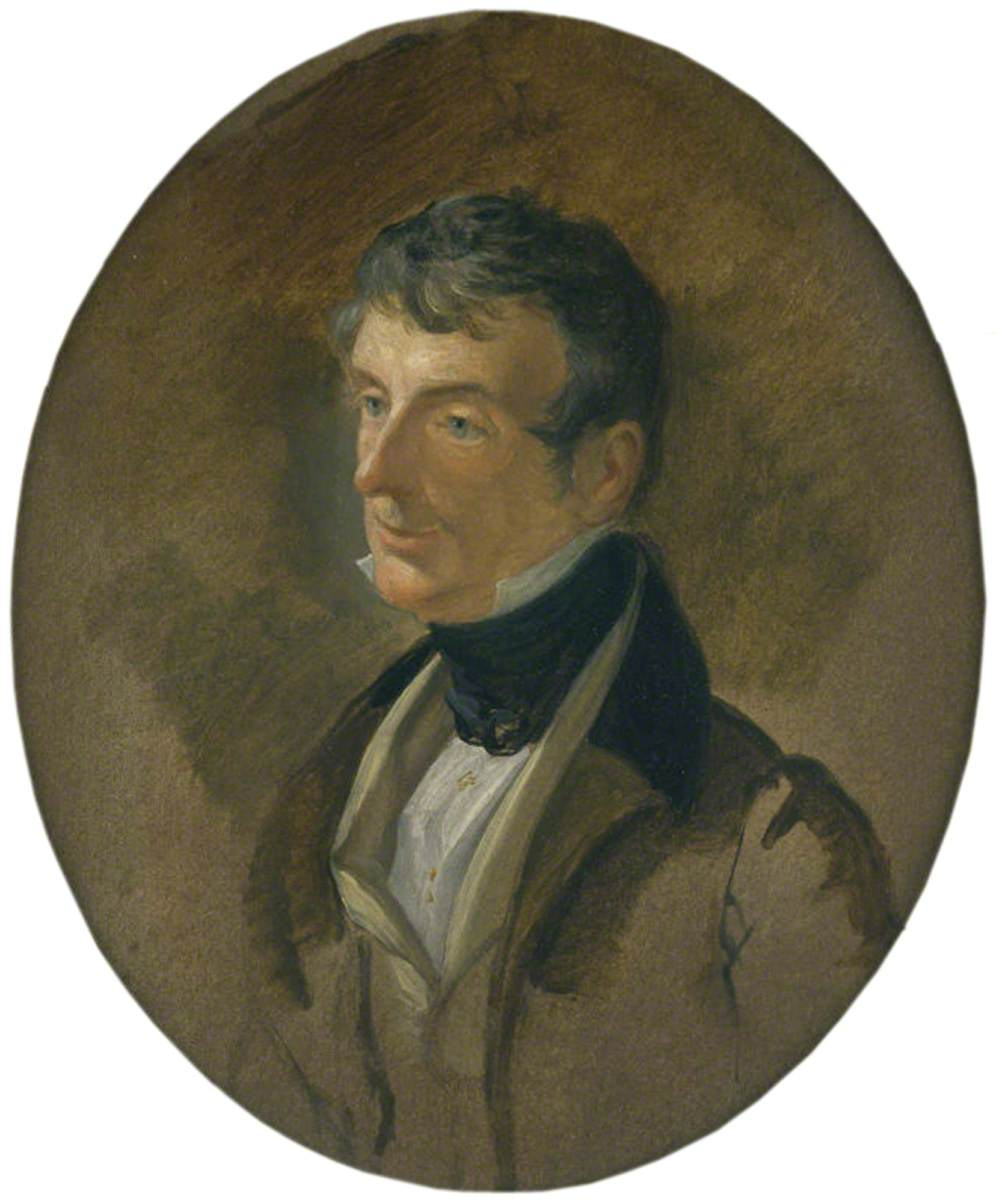
- Portrait by George Sandars, 1812

Member of Parliament for Truro
- In office 1810–1812
- Preceded by: Charles Powlett, 2nd Baron Bayning
- Succeeded by: Sir George Warrender, 4th Baronet

Member of Parliament for Cambridge University
- In office 1822–1826
- Preceded by: John Henry Smyth
- Succeeded by: John Copley, 1st Baron Lyndhurst

Member of Parliament for Marlborough
- In office 1829–1832
- Preceded by: James Brudenell, 7th Earl of Cardigan
- Succeeded by: Henry Bingham Baring

Member of Parliament for Dorset
- In office 1832–1835
- Preceded by: Edward Portman, 1st Viscount Portman
- Succeeded by: Anthony Ashley-Cooper, 7th Earl of Shaftesbury

Personal details
- Born: 11 December 1786
- Died: 15 April 1855 (aged 68) Venice, Kingdom of Lombardy–Venetia
- Party: Tory
- Relations: Henry Bankes (father), Frances Woodley (mother)
- Education: Trinity College, Cambridge
- Occupation: Explorer, egyptologist and adventurer

Military service
- Allegiance: United Kingdom
- Branch/service: British Army
- Rank: aide-de-camp

William John Bankes (11 December 1786 – 15 April 1855) was an English politician, explorer, Egyptologist and adventurer.

The second, but first surviving, son of Henry Bankes MP, he was a member of the Bankes family of Dorset. Sir Charles Barry reclad Kingston Lacy in stone as it is today. He travelled extensively to the Near East and Egypt and made an extensive individual collection of Egyptian artefacts. His work on Egypt, though not acknowledged until the 21st century, is regarded as important. He was a good friend of Lord Byron, Samuel Rogers and Sir Charles Barry. He sat as Tory Member of Parliament (MP) for Truro in 1810, for Cambridge University from 1822 to 1826, for Marlborough (the UK parliamentary constituency that his maternal grandfather, William Woodley, for whom he was named, had held from 1780 to 1784) from 1829 to 1832, and finally for Dorset from 1832 to 1835.

== Early life and education ==
William Bankes was born 11 December in 1786 to Frances Woodley (1760–1823) and Henry Bankes, MP, of Kingston Lacy and Corfe Castle in Dorset. Frances was the eldest daughter of William Woodley (MP for Great Bedwyn and Marlborough), a Caribbean sugar planter, Governor and Captain-General of the Leeward Islands (1766–1771 and 1791–1793), and his wife Frances Payne of St Kitts. William's aunt was Maria Banks (Woodley) Riddell, a well-known poet, who was known to be the chief benefactor of the Scottish poet Robert Burns. William's sister Anne Frances Bankes married Edward Boscawen, 1st Earl of Falmouth in 1810.

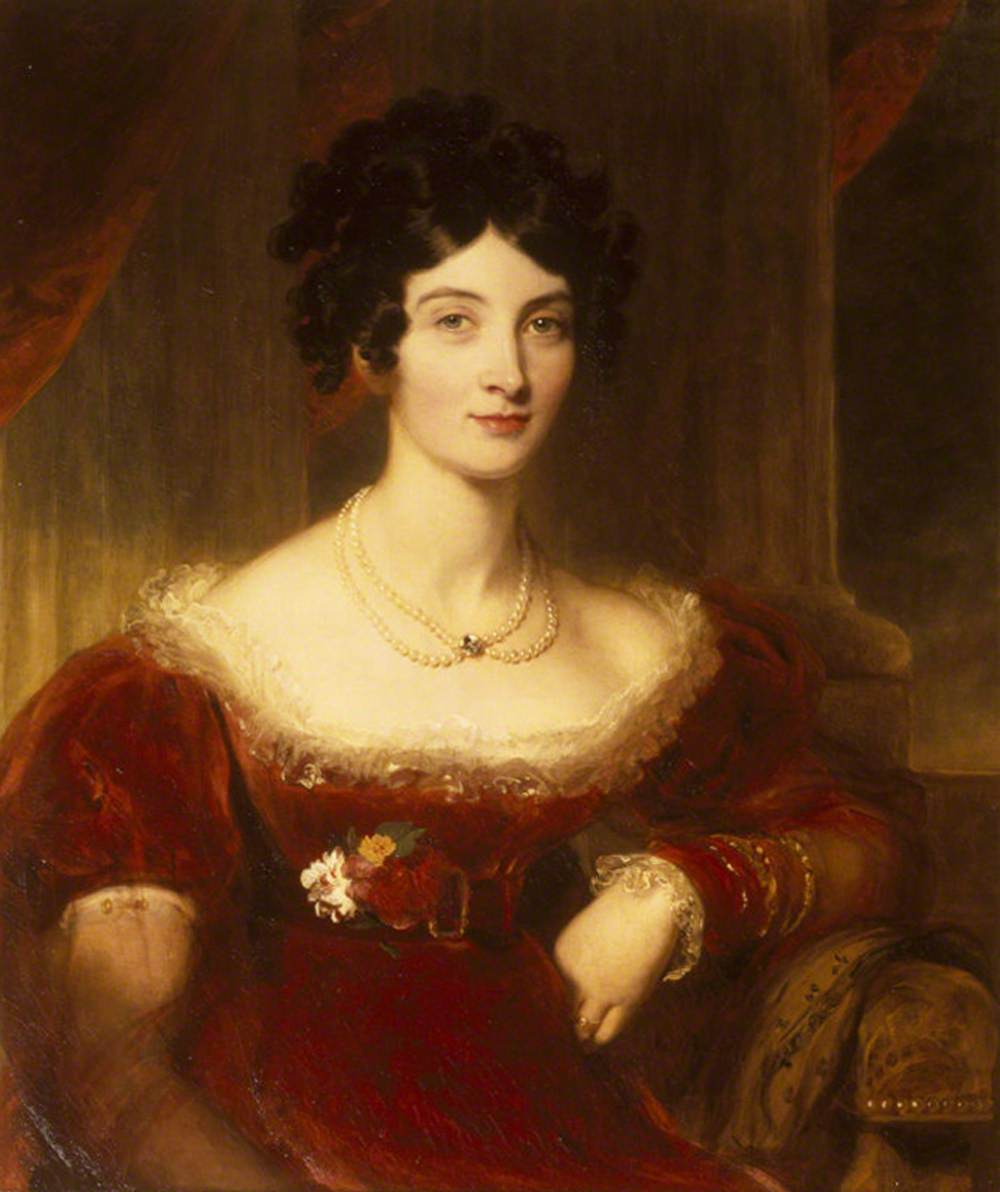
Anne Frances Bankes (1789–1864), Countess of Falmouth by Thomas Lawrence 1810-15 (at Kingston Lacy)

In 1841, on the death of her husband, Lady Falmouth returned to reside at Kingston Lacy. It was Lady Falmouth, in the absence of her brother William, who was responsible for continuing the re-decoration of Kingston Lacy which had been commenced by their mother, Frances (Woodley) Bankes, she was also helped by their younger brother George Bankes.

He was the second of five children and the eldest surviving son. He was educated first at home with visiting masters and then from age 9 at Westminster School. From 1803 he continued his studies at Trinity College, Cambridge where he received his BA in 1808 and his MA in 1811. Lord Byron, a fellow student at Trinity, became his lifelong friend. Bankes sometimes accompanied Byron in his European tours and was described by Lord Byron as the "father of all mischief".

== Parliamentary career ==
In 1810 he was elected MP for Truro, having gained the seat through the patronage of Edward Boscawen, 1st Earl of Falmouth, the previous MP who had entered the House of Lords. He was rarely involved in Parliamentary work and waited nearly two years before giving his maiden speech on the subject of delaying the return of rights to Catholics under Catholic emancipation. When parliament dissolved in 1812 he decided to give up his seat and instead travel abroad.

After completing several years of travel, Bankes as an opponent of Catholic emancipation, was urged to stand and subsequently returned as MP for Cambridge University. Again, he spoke in parliament only on a few occasions, mostly on the subject of Catholic rights and the erection of new churches. He served as MP for Cambridge until 1826 when he did not win reappointment to the seat.

== Adventures and friendships ==
Bankes became interested in exploration and discovery, and had an evident passion for ancient Egypt and fine art. His extensive portfolio of notes, manuscripts and drawings produced and collected during his travels along the Nile with explorations in Egypt, Nubia, and the Near East with Giovanni Finati, whose memoirs he translated, have significant historical value and provide the only historical record of some inscriptions and monuments.

Bankes inherited Soughton Hall in Flintshire, Wales from his great uncle, and in 1835 inherited his family's home, Kingston Lacy. The mansion was home to Bankes for many years and still houses his vast collections of art and artefacts.

Sir Charles Barry, a renowned architect in his day, was also a long-term friend of Bankes. The two men met in 1819 at the temple of Rameses in Abu Simbel, where Bankes made drawings and arranged for the transport of the bilingual obelisk from Philae that may be seen in the gardens of Kingston Lacy today. Bankes had great respect for Barry's talents and Barry accomplished much of the building work on the Bankes's family properties over the years. Barry is known for his work on the Palace of Westminster, St. Peter's Church in Brighton, the Victoria Tower and the Westminster Bridge. His work was inspired by Italian Renaissance architecture and contributed to the improved design of Bankes' home, Kingston Lacy.

While travelling in Spain and Portugal during the Peninsular War, Bankes served as aide-de-camp to the Duke of Wellington, who later came to Bankes' rescue when Bankes was put on trial and subsequently acquitted in 1833 for engaging in a homosexual act near Westminster Abbey. The Duke also celebrated Bankes' successes; he performed the ceremony at Kingston Lacy when the foundation was laid for one of Bankes' most notable discoveries, the Philae obelisk.

Bankes was an amateur architect, a careful epigrapher, and mastered the art of copying ancient inscriptions. He was very interested in Egypt and, though he was an opponent of Champollion, in deciphering ancient Egyptian hieroglyphs. Bankes dabbled in architecture and with the assistance of his friend Charles Barry, transformed Kingston Lacy by encasing the brick structure with stone. He collected numerous Spanish paintings, by Murillo and others, as well as artefacts from Ancient Egypt which are still housed at the house.

He was elected a Fellow of the Royal Society in March 1822.

== Exile and death ==
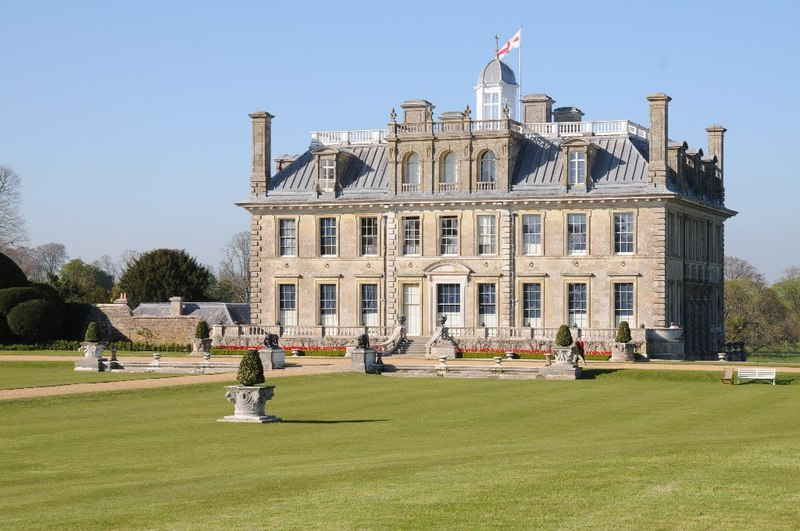
Kingston Lacy, the seat of Bankes family.

In 1841 Bankes left England, effectively exiled, after being legally declared an outlaw as a result of his failure to appear for a trial for homosexual activity. He sought refuge after being caught in compromising circumstances with a guardsman in Green Park in London. He was arrested and then released on bail, enabling him to flee. At the time, sodomy was a grave crime in England and carried with it the death penalty – the last executions in England for sodomy had occurred only six years earlier, in 1835. To avoid seizure of his house by the crown, he signed Kingston Lacy over to his brother, George Bankes. He settled as an exile in Venice.

Even though he was unable to return to Kingston Lacy, he continued to collect from abroad, sending his collections to be displayed in his beloved home. One of his commissions for Kingston Lacy in 1853 was a set of 16 bronze tortoises from the sculptor Carlo Marochetti as supporters for four decorative marble urns; their design was based on one of Bankes' pet tortoises. Four were stolen in 1992, but returned to the house in 2021.

He is believed to have secretly visited Kingston Lacy to admire his home and collections before his death in Venice. He was buried in the family vault in Wimborne Minster.

In 2017, the National Trust celebrated Bankes with an exhibition at Kingston Lacy, following the 50th anniversary of the passing of the Sexual Offences Act 1967.

Parliament of the United Kingdom
Preceded by Charles Townshend; John Lemon	Member of Parliament for Truro; 1810–1812; With: John Lemon	Succeeded by Sir George Warrender, 4th Baronet; John Lemon
Preceded by John Henry Smyth; Viscount Palmerston	Member of Parliament for Cambridge University; 1822–1826; With: Viscount Palmerston	Succeeded by Sir John Copley; Viscount Palmerston
Preceded by Lord Brudenell; Thomas Bucknall-Estcourt	Member of Parliament for Marlborough; 1829–1832; With: Thomas Bucknall-Estcourt	Succeeded by Lord Ernest Bruce; Henry Bingham Baring
Preceded by Edward Portman; Lord Ashley	Member of Parliament for Dorset; 1832–1835; With: Lord Ashley; William Ponsonby	Succeeded by Henry Sturt; Lord Ashley; William Ponsonby
