= Hugh Boscawen, 1st Viscount Falmouth =

English politician

Arms of Boscawen: Ermine, a rose gules barbed and seeded proper

Hugh Boscawen, 1st Viscount Falmouth PC (pronounced "Boscowen") (/bɒsˈkoʊ.ən/ bos-KOH-ən; ca. 1680 – 25 October 1734), was an English Whig politician who sat in the House of Commons for Cornish constituencies from 1702 until 1720 when he was raised to the peerage.

== Origins ==
Boscawen was the eldest son of Edward Boscawen (1628–1685), MP and merchant, by his wife Jael Godolphin, daughter of Sir Francis Godolphin (d. 1667). The Boscawens are an ancient Cornish family. His grandfather Hugh Boscawen (fl. 1620) of Tregothnan was thirteenth in descent from a certain Henry de Boscawen. He derived a huge income from his copper mines at Chacewater and Gwennap where he was the principal landowner. The Chacewater mine, now known as Wheal Busy, was located in what was known at the time as "the richest square mile on Earth". During its life, it produced over 100,000 tons of copper ore and 27,000 tons of arsenic. His uncles Hugh Boscawen (1625–1701) and Charles Boscawen (1627–1689) were also MPs in Cornwall.

== Early life ==
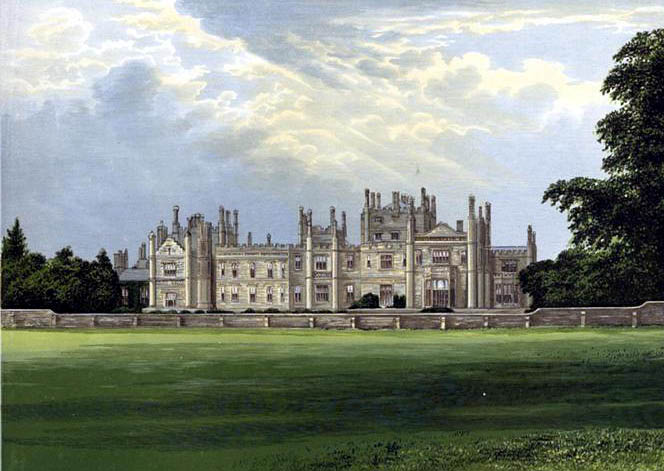
Tregothnan House, in 1880. Published in Morris, Rev. F. O. Picturesque Views of Seats of Noblemen & Gentlemen of Great Britain & Ireland, London, 1880

He matriculated as fellow-commoner at King's College, Cambridge, in 1697. In 1701 he inherited Tregothnan from his uncle, Hugh Boscawen.

== Career ==
Boscawen had absolute control of the parliamentary representation of the boroughs of Tregony and Truro, and he exercised considerable influence on the elections for Penryn. He was elected Member of Parliament for Tregony from 1702 to 1705, for the county of Cornwall from 1705 to 1710, for Truro from 1710 to 1713, and for Penryn from 1713 until June 1720. In 1720 he was raised to the peerage as Baron Boscawen and Viscount Falmouth, having been for some time discontented at the delay in his advancement to that position. Both before and after the accession of George I he spent large sums of money in support of Whig principles, and was rewarded on his party's triumph by many valuable offices.

Boscawen was a groom of the bedchamber to Prince George of Denmark, steward of the duchy of Cornwall and Lord Warden of the Stannaries in 1708, Comptroller of the Household from 1714 to 1720, and joint Vice-Treasurer of Ireland from 1717 until a few months before his death.

== Marriage and children ==
Boscawen married on 23 April 1700 in Henry VII's Chapel, Westminster Abbey, Charlotte Godfrey elder daughter and coheir of Colonel Charles Godfrey, master of the jewel office and his wife Arabella Churchill. Charlotte died on 22 March 1754, and was also buried at Penkivel. She had wanted to become a lady of the bedchamber to the wife of King George II, and tried to bribe Lady Sundon (Charlotte Clayton Sundon) into obtaining the post for her. Their children included:

- Anne (1703/4–1749), second daughter who married Sir Cecil Bishopp, 6th Baronet. Her children included: Cecil Bisshopp, 12th Baron Zouche, Harriett Lady Dunce, Anne wife of Hon. Robert Brudenell whose son was 6th Earl of Cardigan; Charlotte Lady Maynard, Frances Lady Warren Maid of honour to Queen Charlotte 1761–4, Catherine Bishopp, Countess of Liverpool, Baroness Hawkesbury among others.
- Hugh Boscawen, 2nd Viscount Falmouth (1707–1782), eldest son
- Edward Boscawen (1711–1761), MP, PC, Admiral, 3rd son.
- George Boscawen (1712–1775), MP, 4th son
- John Boscawen (1714–1767), MP, 5th son.
  - William Augustus Spencer Boscawen, MP (7 January 1750 – 1828). Son of John, and his wife Thomasine, who died before William's baptism at St James's Church, Piccadilly, on 30 January 1750.

== Death and burial ==
Boscawen died suddenly at Trefusis, in Cornwall, aged 54, and was buried at St Michael Penkivel.

== See also ==
- A. A. Hanham, 'Boscawen, Hugh, first Viscount Falmouth (c.1680–1734)’, Oxford Dictionary of National Biography, accessed 27 Aug 2007.

Parliament of England
Preceded by Francis Robartes; Hugh Fortescue	Member of Parliament for Tregony; 1702–1705; With: Joseph Sawle	Succeeded by John Trevanion; Sir Philip Meadowes
Preceded by Henry Vincent; Sir Philip Meadowes	Member of Parliament for Truro; 1705; With: Henry Vincent	Succeeded by Henry Vincent; Peregrine Bertie
Preceded by James Buller; Sir Richard Vyvyan, Bt	Member of Parliament for Cornwall; 1705–1707; With: Sir Richard Vyvyan, Bt	Succeeded by Parliament of Great Britain
Parliament of Great Britain
Preceded by Parliament of England	Member of Parliament for Cornwall; 1707–1710; With: Sir Richard Vyvyan, Bt 1707–1708; James Buller 1708–1710	Succeeded by George Granville; John Trevanion
Preceded by Henry Vincent; Robert Furnese	Member of Parliament for Truro; 1710–1713; With: Henry Vincent	Succeeded by Thomas Hare; William Collier
Preceded by Samuel Trefusis; Alexander Pendarves	Member of Parliament for Penryn; 1713–1720; With: Alexander Pendarves 1713–1714; Samuel Trefusis 1714–1720	Succeeded by Samuel Trefusis; Viscount Rialton
Political offices
Preceded by Viscount Rialton	Lord Warden of the Stannaries; 1708–1734	Succeeded by Richard Edgcumbe
Preceded by Sir John Stonhouse, Bt	Comptroller of the Household; 1714–1720	Succeeded by Paul Methuen
Peerage of Great Britain
New creation	Viscount Falmouth; 1720–1734	Succeeded by Hugh Boscawen
