= Richard Ashley Thigpen =

Richard A. Thigpen

President of the University of Alabama (acting)
- In office 1975–1977
- Preceded by: F. David Mathews
- Succeeded by: F. David Mathews

Personal details
- Born: March 22, 1943 (age 83) Birmingham, Alabama, U.S.
- Education: University of Alabama

Richard Ashley Thigpen (born March 22, 1943) is an American academic. He served as acting president of University of Alabama from 1975 to 1977. He is a lawyer and law professor, having attended the University of Alabama (B.A. 1963, M.A. 1965), University of Alabama Law School (J.D. 1968, LLM 1969), and Yale University (LLD 1976). Thigpen is a member of the Alabama Healthcare Hall of Fame.
