= Samuel Trotman (1686–1748) =

Samuel Trotman (7 March 1686 –2 February 1748), of Bucknell, Oxfordshire, was a British lawyer and politician who sat in the House of Commons from 1722 to 1734.

Trotman was the eldest son. of Lenthall Trotman of Bucknell and his wife Mary Phillips, daughter of Thomas Phillips of Ickford, Buckinghamshire. He matriculated at Trinity College, Oxford on 15 January 1702, aged 17, and was admitted at Inner Temple, He was called to the bar in 1710. Also in 1710, he succeeded his father to the family estate. He married, his cousin, Dorothea Trotman, daughter of Samuel Trotman of Siston Court, Gloucestershire on 16 October 1712.

Trotman was returned as Member of Parliament for New Woodstock at the 1722 general election with the support of the Tory Earl of Abingdon against the Duchess of Marlborough's candidates,. He was returned unopposed at the 1727 general election. There is no record of him voting and he did not stand again at the 1734 general election.

Trotman died without issue on 2 February 1748.

Parliament of Great Britain
Preceded by William Clayton; Charles Crisp	Member of Parliament for New Woodstock; 1722–1734; With: Sir Thomas Wheate; Marquess of Blandford; Hon. John Spencer	Succeeded by James Dawkins; Hon. John Spencer
