= St Michael Penkevil =

Village in Cornwall, England

Coordinates: 50.240°N 5.005°W

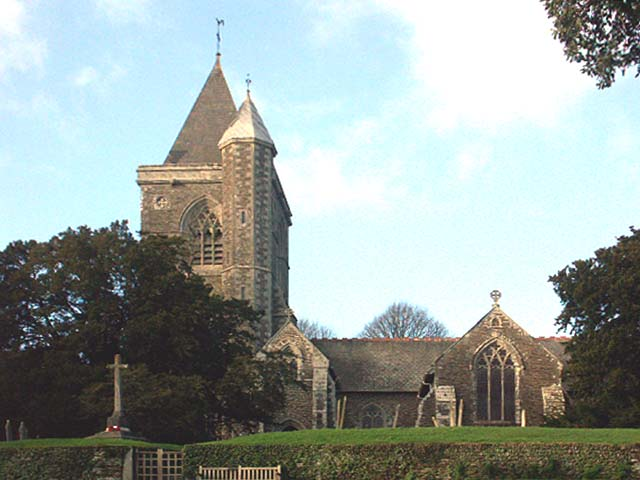
- St Michael Penkivel Church

- Location within Cornwall
- Population: 287 (2021 census)
- Civil parish: St Michael Penkevil
- Unitary authority: Cornwall
- Ceremonial county: Cornwall
- Region: South West
- Country: England
- Sovereign state: United Kingdom
- Post town: TRURO
- Postcode district: TR2

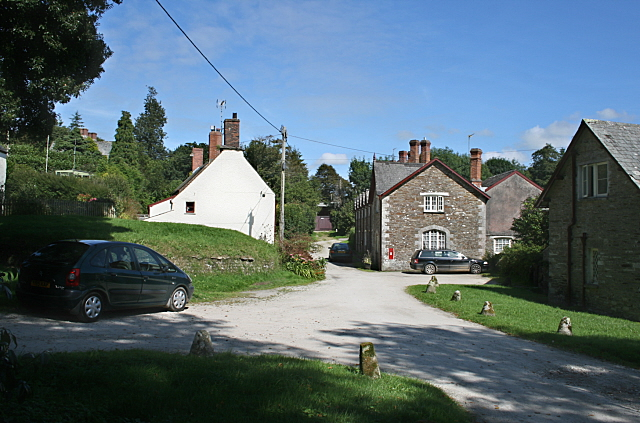
St Michael Penkivel

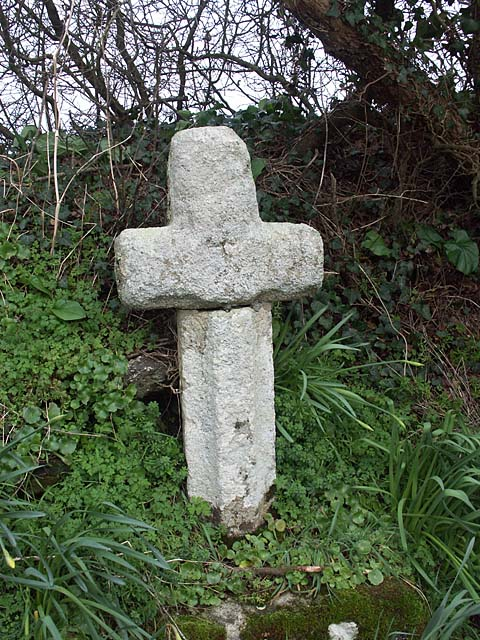
Fentongollan Cross

St Michael Penkivel (Cornish: Pennkevyl), sometimes spelt St Michael Penkevil, is a civil parish and village in Cornwall, England, United Kingdom. It is in the valley of the River Fal about three miles (5 km) southeast of Truro. The population at the 2021 census was 287. St Michael Penkivel lies within the Cornwall Area of Outstanding Natural Beauty (AONB). Merther and Lamorran are within the parish.

== History and description ==
The church is close to the Tregothnan estate in a wooded setting and was consecrated in 1261; probably consisting only of a nave and chancel. In 1319 a petition raised by the patron of the church, Sir John Trejagu, was granted by the Bishop of Exeter, Walter de Stapledon; to create a collegiate church by building a chantry for four chaplains. At the time of its restoration by George Street in the 19th century, the church was cruciform with a western tower and south porch. It was re-opened for services on Christmas Eve, 1865.

There are some monuments to members of the notable local family of Boscawen. The church contains the brass of John Trembras, rector of the parish, d. 1515, and others of John Trenowyth, 1498, Marie Coffin, née Boscawen, 1622, John Boscawen, d. 1564, engraved 1634.

Fentongollan Cross is a wayside Latin cross. Only the upper part of the cross is original. Another cross from this parish was taken to Canada in the 19th century and still exists at Greensville, Flamborough, Ontario.

The village was used as the main location for the 2005 feature film Keeping Mum which starred Rowan Atkinson, Patrick Swayze, Kristin Scott Thomas and Dame Maggie Smith.

== Notable people ==
Oliver Carminow (died 1597) from Fentongollan in the parish was a Member of the Parliament of England.
