= Philip Meadows (died 1781) =

Deputy ranger

Philip Meadows (1708–1781) was Deputy Ranger of Richmond Park (1761–1781).

== Family and early life ==
He was the third son of Sir Philip Meadowes and Dorothy, sister of Hugh Boscawen, 1st Viscount Falmouth. In 1734 he married Frances (born 1711), only daughter of William Pierrepoint, Earl of Kingston.

Meadows was a nephew of Hugh Boscawen, 1st Viscount Falmouth, and a first cousin of the Hon. Edward Boscawen, Admiral of the Blue, whose wife was Frances Boscawen. In 1766, their daughter Elizabeth married Henry Somerset, 5th Duke of Beaufort, becoming his Duchess.

Meadows's wife, Lady Frances Meadows, died in 1795, many years after her husband.

Philip Meadows and Lady Frances Meadows had two sons:

- Charles Pierrepoint, 1st Earl Manvers
- Sir William Medows
