= Edward Boscawen, 1st Earl of Falmouth =

British peer and politician

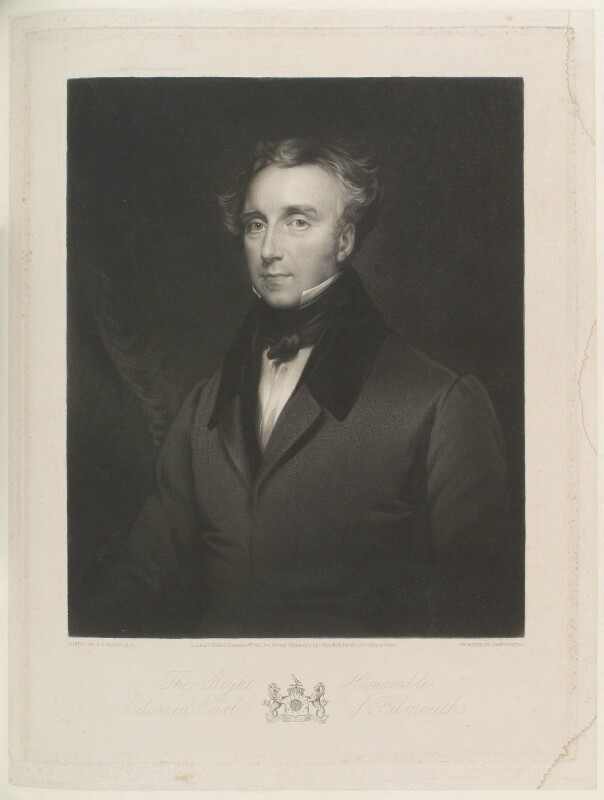
Edward Boscawen, 1st Earl of Falmouth, 4th Viscount Falmouth

Edward Boscawen, 1st Earl of Falmouth (10 May 1787 – 29 December 1841), known as the Viscount Falmouth between 1808 and 1821, was a British peer and politician.

== Background ==
Falmouth was the son of George Boscawen, 3rd Viscount Falmouth and Elizabeth Anne, the only daughter of John Crewe, of Cheshire. He was educated at Eton College and served briefly as an ensign in the Coldstream Guards.

== Career ==
In the General Election of 1807, Falmouth was elected Member of Parliament for Truro, standing as a Tory on the day before his 20th birthday. On the death of his father the following year, he resigned both his seat and his commission and took up his place in the House of Lords. He used his patronage to appoint his potential brother in law William John Bankes as his successor as MP for Truro. In 1821, on the coronation of George IV, he was created Earl of Falmouth.

As a member of the Ultra-Tory faction, he was vehemently opposed to parliamentary reform and Catholic emancipation. In 1829 he acted as second to Lord Winchilsea in his famous duel with the Duke of Wellington over the latter issue. He always insisted that he persuaded Winchelsea to fire into the air, and he had certainly prepared an apology, which Wellington accepted.

He was the last Recorder of Truro and the author of a pamphlet on the subject of stannary courts.

== Family ==
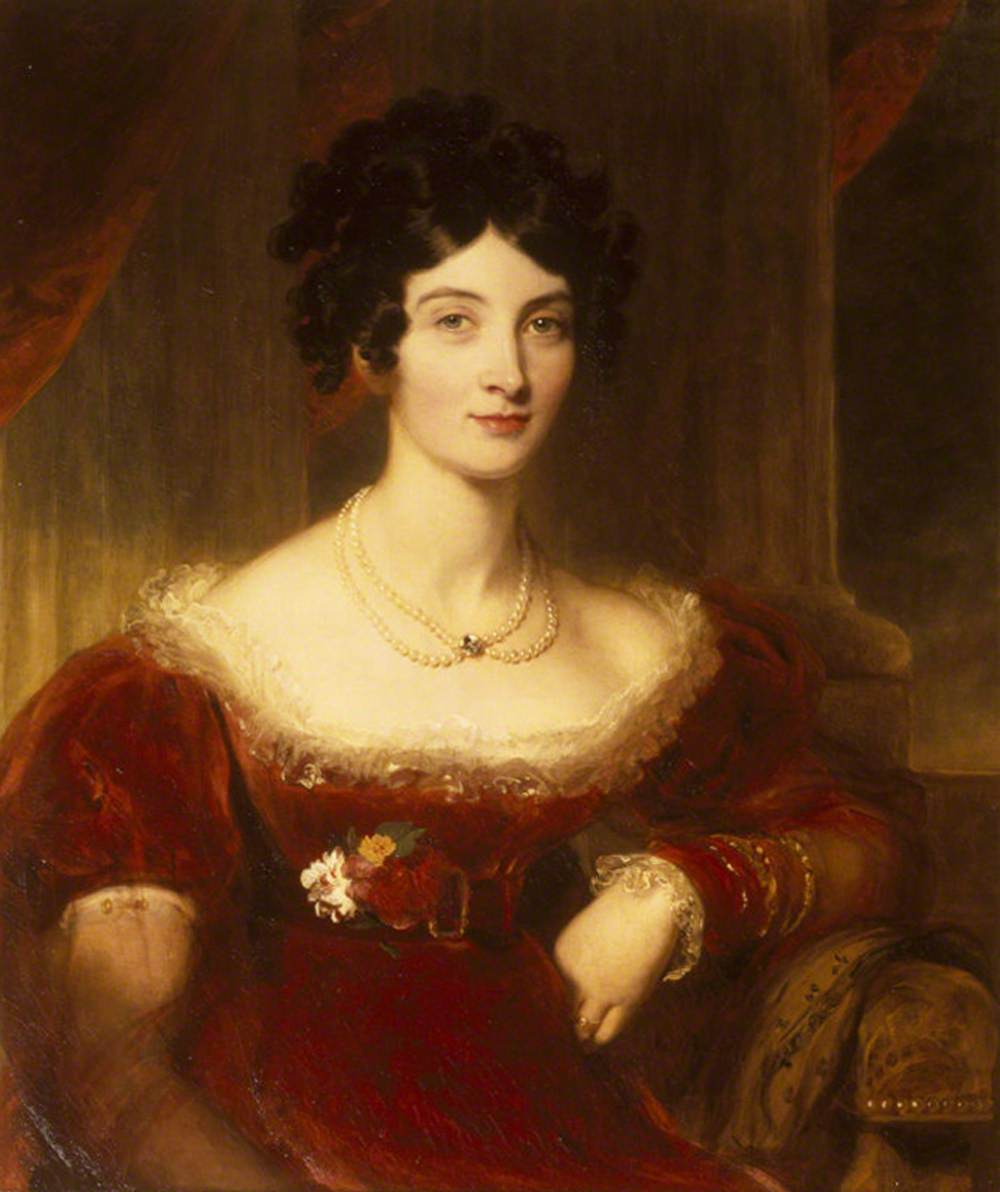
Anne Frances Bankes (1789–1864), Countess of Falmouth by Thomas Lawrence (Kingston Lacy)

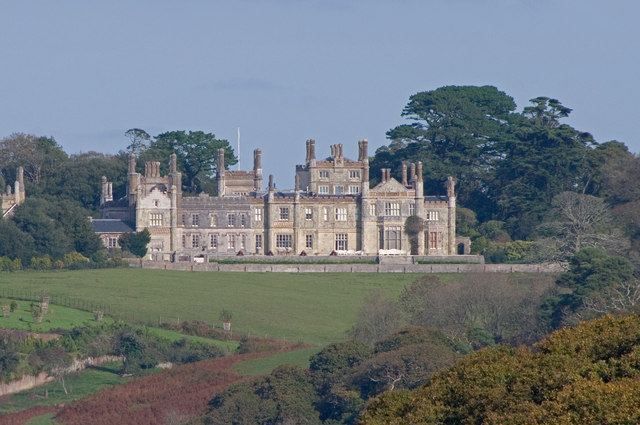
Tregothnan House

Lord Falmouth was married to Anne Frances Bankes (1790–1864), elder daughter of Henry Bankes of Kingston Lacy estate on 27 August 1810. She was from the old and prominent Bankes family, her brothers were "the exiled" William John Bankes and George Bankes.

He died at Tregothnan in December 1841, aged 54, and was succeeded by his only son, George.

After his death, his widow came to stay periodically at Kingston Lacy to help her exiled brother, William John Bankes (1786-1855) in the reorganisation of their family home. Lady Falmouth lived at 3 Whitehall Gardens, Westminster, until her death in 1864. A philanthropist, she endowed almshouses at Brimpton and a village school at Woolhampton, both in Berkshire.

Parliament of the United Kingdom
Preceded by John Lemon; Edward Leveson-Gower	Member of Parliament for Truro; 1807–1808; With: John Lemon	Succeeded by John Lemon; Hon. Charles Townshend
Peerage of the United Kingdom
New creation	Earl of Falmouth; 1821–1841	Succeeded by George Henry Boscawen
Peerage of Great Britain
Preceded by George Henry Boscawen	Viscount Falmouth; 1808–1841	Succeeded by George Henry Boscawen
