= Edward Boscawen (Truro MP, born 1628) =

English politician

Edward Boscawen (1628 – 28 October 1685) was an English politician who sat in the House of Commons variously between 1659 and 1685.

== Origins ==
Boscawen was the son of Hugh Boscawen of Tregothnan, Cornwall by his wife Margaret Rolle, daughter of Robert Rolle (1560–1633) of Heanton Satchville, Petrockstowe, Devon. He was baptised on 21 November 1628. His brothers were Hugh Boscawen (1625–1701), MP, and Charles Boscawen (1627–1689), MP, both of whom also represented Cornish constituencies. The Boscawens are an ancient Cornish family. His father Hugh Boscawen (fl.1620) of Tregothnan was thirteenth in descent from a certain Henry de Boscawen. He derived a huge income from his copper mines at Chacewater and Gwennap where he was the principal landowner. The Chacewater mine, now known as Wheal Busy, was located in what was known at one time as "the richest square mile on Earth". During its life it produced over 100,000 tons of copper ore, and 27,000 tons of arsenic.

== Career ==
He was apprenticed to a Turkey Merchant in 1648 and then to his uncle John Rolle (1598–1648), MP, who strongly resisted the Tonnage and poundage taxation. Boscawen prospered and acquired Worthevale and Roscarrock in North Cornwall. In 1659, Boscawen was elected Member of Parliament for Tregoney in the Third Protectorate Parliament. In 1660 Boscawen stood for parliament at Tregoney and at Truro and was returned for both seats. He chose to sit for Truro and was returned again in 1661 for the Cavalier Parliament. He held the seat until his death in 1685. He was relatively inactive in parliament in comparison with his brother Hugh.

Boscawen was commissioner for militia in Cornwall in March 1660. In 1661 he became a member of the Corporation for the Propagation of the Gospel in New England. He was commissioner for assessment in Cornwall from 1661 to 1680. He was Justice of the Peace for Cornwall from 1667 to 1670. In 1670 he became a freeman of the Levant Company and in 1673 stannator, Tywarnwhaile. He was a commissioner for recusants in Cornwall in 1675 and commissioner for assessment in Westminster from 1677 to 1680.

== Marriage and children ==
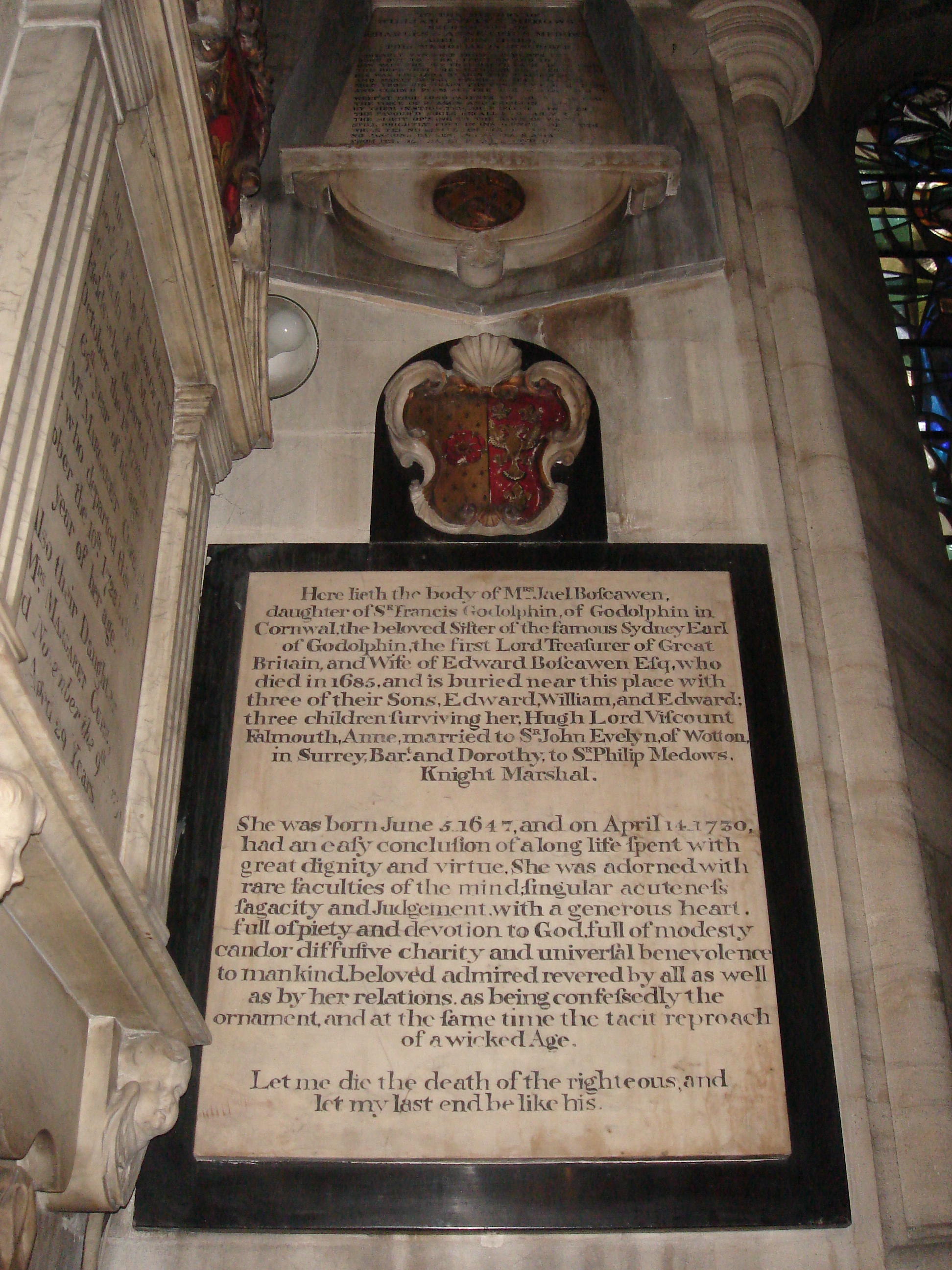
The memorial stone of Jael Boscawen at St Mary Abbots, Kensington: "...revered by all as well as by her relations as being confessedly the ornament, and at the same time the tacit reproach of a wicked Age."

On 5 January 1665 Boscawen married Jael Godolphin, daughter of Francis Godolphin (1605–1667) of Godolphin Breage Cornwall. They had one son and two daughters. His son was Hugh Boscawen, 1st Viscount Falmouth (1680–1734) who had served as a Cornish MP before his elevation to the peerage.

== Death and burial ==
Boscawen died at the age of 56 and was buried at St Mary Abbots, Kensington.

Parliament of England
Preceded by Not represented	Member of Parliament for Tregoney; 1659; With: John Thomas	Succeeded by Not represented in restored Rump
Preceded by Not represented in restored Rump	Member of Parliament for Tregoney; 1660; With: Sir John Temple	Succeeded by Sir John Temple; Peter Courtney
Preceded by Not represented in restored Rump	Member of Parliament for Truro; 1660–1685; With: Walter Vincent 1660; Nicholas Arundell; John Arundell; William Boscawen; Sir Henrry Ashurst, 1st Baronet	Succeeded by John Arundell; Henry Vincent
