= Tregothnan =

House and estate in Cornwall, England

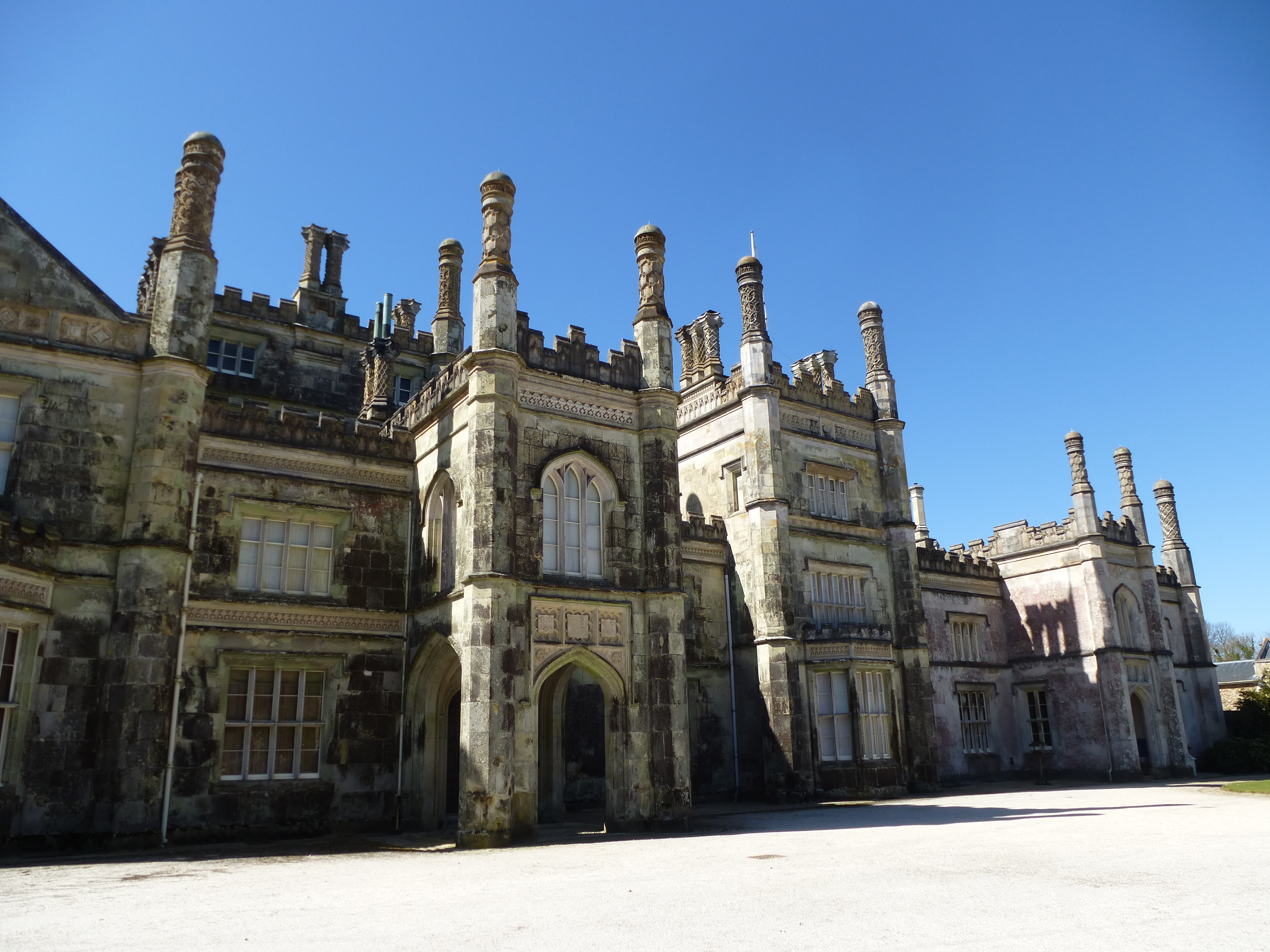
- Tregothnan House, entrance front

- Location within Cornwall

General information
- Location: St Michael Penkivel, Cornwall, United Kingdom
- Coordinates: 50.23527°N 5.00571°W
- Client: Hugh Boscawen (first build)

Design and construction
- Architects: William Wilkins; Lewis Vulliamy

Listed Building – Grade I
- Designated: 28 February 1952
- Reference no.: 1141069

National Register of Historic Parks and Gardens
- Designated: 11 June 1987
- Reference no.: 1000655

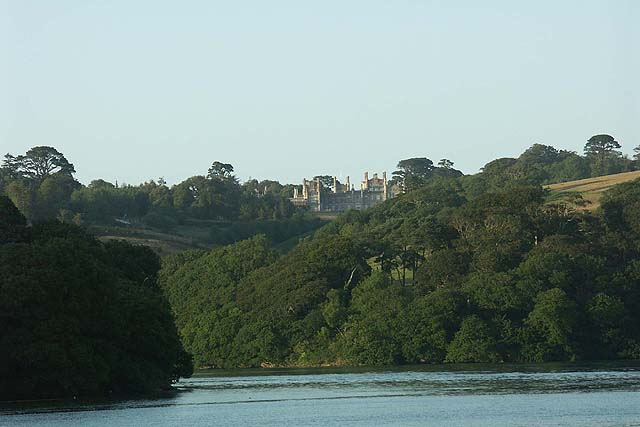
Tregothnan House, above an inlet of the Carrick Roads, at the southern end of which is the port-town of Falmouth

Tregothnan is a country house and estate near the village of St Michael Penkivel, 3 miles (4.8 km) southeast of Truro, Cornwall, England. The estate has for many centuries been a possession of the Boscawens, a prominent Cornish family, whose heads have held the title of Viscount Falmouth since 1720.

== Geography ==
=== Location ===
Tregothnan is located on a hill overlooking an inlet of the Truro River. It includes many varied grounds and wooded areas beyond the immediate environs of the house.

== History ==
The house and estate is the historic seat of the Boscawen family, Viscounts Falmouth. Tregothnan was acquired in 1334 (or 1335) by John de Boscawen when he married the heiress, Joan de Tregothnan. The medieval house then had a courtyard plan with a prominent gate-tower. The original medieval house was ransacked in the 17th century during the English Civil War.

The new house was built after 1650. This building was visited and described by Celia Fiennes, a cousin of Hugh Boscawen, the builder. In the 18th century, the house was the home of Admiral Edward Boscawen. In 1818, the house was enlarged by William Wilkins for the fourth Viscount Falmouth and in 1845–48 Lewis Vulliamy rebuilt it for the second Earl of Falmouth.

In 1872 the land holdings of Viscount Falmouth, of Mereworth Castle, Maidstone, Kent, were listed in the top ten land holdings in Cornwall, with an estate of 25,910 acres (10,490 ha), 3.41% of the total area of Cornwall.

A banner of the arms of the Boscawen family, flown atop the house

Tregothnan is still managed by the Boscawen family today.

== Description ==
The house is mainly the work of William Wilkins (the rebuilding of 1816–18) and Lewis Vulliamy (the enlargement of 1845–48). Wilkins adopted an East Anglian Tudor Gothic style of great picturesqueness and the project retained parts of the medieval house; however Vulliamy's enlargement involved the removal of what remained of the medieval house.

=== Gardens ===
Tregothnan is famous for its large private botanical garden and arboretum, which are not open to the public. Guided visits to the garden may be arranged.

A tea plantation was started on the grounds in 1999. Tregothnan was home to the first outdoor camellias in the UK, around 1800. The first commercial tea was developed from Camellia sinensis, the "Chinese tea plant", in 2001. The first 'English tea' was then sold in November 2005 to Fortnum & Mason of Piccadilly. The Tregothnan Estate plans on marketing a brand-named tea house franchise called Festival of Tea, to be opened as far afield as China. The first tea plants were established in the Kitchen Garden in 1999 although the conditions there were not suitable for expansion. Research was undertaken by Jonathon Jones, MD of Trading and botanist, on-site and in every tea region of the world with the support of a Nuffield Scholarship. Over 20,000 additional tea bushes are planted annually between April and October. The Tregothnan microclimate is the result of the 60 feet (18 metres) deep sea water creek that bisects the tea gardens, six miles inland and away from salt wind exposure.

Global media interest in the project to create the most British tea in history has helped develop the charity open weekend of the gardens into possibly the largest of its kind in the world.

There are custom-made bee hives among Leptospermum ("Manuka") bushes", producing honey with measurable methylglyoxal content.
