= Viscount Falmouth =

Viscountcy in the Peerage of Great Britain

Viscountcy Falmouth
- Arms of Boscawen: Ermine, a rose gules barbed and seeded proper
- Creation date: 1674 (first creation); 18 June 1720 (second creation)
- Peerage: Peerage of England (first creation); Peerage of Great Britain (second creation)
- First holder: George FitzRoy, 1st Duke of Northumberland (first creation); Hugh Boscawen, 1st Viscount Falmouth (second creation)
- Present holder: Evelyn Boscawen, 10th Viscount Falmouth
- Heir apparent: Evelyn George William Boscawen
- Remainder to: Heirs male of the first viscount's body lawfully begotten
- Subsidiary titles: Baron le Despencer; Baron Boscawen-Rose
- Status: Extant
- Extinction date: 1716 (first creation)
- Seat: Tregothnan
- Former seat: Mereworth Castle
- Motto: Patience Passe Science ("Patience Surpasses Knowledge"); In coelo quies ("In Heaven There is Rest")

Arms of the Boscawen family, Earls and Viscounts Falmouth: Ermine, a rose gules barbed and seeded proper; crest, per Debrett's Peerage, 1968: A falcon close proper; supporters: Two sea lions erect on their tails argent gutte de larmes

Viscount Falmouth is a title that has been created twice, first in the Peerage of England, and then in the Peerage of Great Britain. The first creation came in the Peerage of England in 1674 for George FitzRoy, an illegitimate son of King Charles II by Barbara Villiers. He was created Earl of Northumberland at the same time and in 1683 he was made Duke of Northumberland. However, he left no heirs, so the titles became extinct at his death in 1716.

The second creation came in the Peerage of Great Britain in 1720 for Hugh Boscawen (c.1680-1734). He was made Baron Boscawen-Rose at the same time, also in the Peerage of Great Britain. Boscawen had earlier represented Tregony, Cornwall, Truro and Penryn in Parliament and notably served as Comptroller of the Household and Vice-Treasurer of Ireland. His son, the second Viscount, was a General in the Army and also sat as a Member of Parliament for Truro. He later served as Captain of the Yeomen of the Guard. His nephew, the third Viscount, held office as Captain of the Honourable Band of Gentlemen Pensioners from 1797 to 1799. His son, the fourth Viscount, represented Truro in the House of Commons. In 1821 he was created Earl of Falmouth, in the County of Cornwall, in the Peerage of the United Kingdom. He was succeeded by his son, the second Earl. He briefly represented Cornwall West in the House of Commons.

On his death in 1852 the earldom became extinct while he was succeeded in the other titles by his first cousin, the sixth Viscount. He was the son of Reverend John Evelyn Boscawen, second son of the third Viscount. Lord Falmouth married in 1845 Mary Frances Elizabeth Boscawen, 17th Baroness le Despencer (see the Baron le Despencer). In 1872 Viscount Falmouth was listed as one of the top ten landowners in Cornwall, with an estate of 25,910 acres (104.9 km^{2}) or 3.41% of the total area of Cornwall. They were both succeeded by their son, the seventh Viscount and eighteenth Baron, who was a Major-General in the Army. He was allegedly the father of Lady Randolph Churchill's second son, John (1880–1947). Since 1889 the ancient barony of Le Despencer has been a subsidiary title of the viscountcy of Falmouth. As of 2022 the titles are held by his great-grandson, the tenth Viscount, who succeeded his 102-year-old father in March of that year.

The Conservative politician Robert Boscawen was the younger brother of the ninth Viscount.

The family seat is Tregothnan, near Truro, Cornwall.

== Viscount Falmouth, first creation (1674) ==
- George FitzRoy, 1st Duke of Northumberland (1665–1716)

== Viscount Falmouth, second creation (1720) ==
- Hugh Boscawen, 1st Viscount Falmouth (c. 1680 – 1734)
- Hugh Boscawen, 2nd Viscount Falmouth (1707–1782)
- George Evelyn Boscawen, 3rd Viscount Falmouth (1758–1808)
- Edward Boscawen, 4th Viscount Falmouth (1787–1841) (created Earl of Falmouth in 1821)

=== Earl of Falmouth (1821) ===
- Edward Boscawen, 1st Earl of Falmouth (1787–1841)
- George Henry Boscawen, 2nd Earl of Falmouth (1811–1852)

=== Viscount Falmouth (1720; reverted) ===
- Evelyn Boscawen, 6th Viscount Falmouth (1819–1889)
- Evelyn Edward Thomas Boscawen, 7th Viscount Falmouth (1847–1918)
- Evelyn Hugh John Boscawen, 8th Viscount Falmouth (1887–1962)
- George Hugh Boscawen, 9th Viscount Falmouth (1919–2022)
- Evelyn Arthur Hugh Boscawen, 10th Viscount Falmouth (born 1955)

The heir apparent is his son, Hon. Evelyn George William Boscawen (born 1979). The heir apparent's heir apparent is his son, Evelyn Ralph Constantine Boscawen (born 2015).

=== Male-line family tree ===
Male-line family tree, Viscounts Falmouth and Earls of Falmouth.

Hugh Boscawen; 1st Viscount Falmouth c. 1680 – 1734
Hugh Boscawen; 2nd Viscount Falmouth; 1707–1782	Adm. Rt Hon. Edward Boscawen; 1711–1761
Unknown son b. 1757 – ?	Unknown son b. 1757 – ?	George Boscawen; 3rd Viscount Falmouth; 1758–1808
Earl of Falmouth
Edward Boscawen; 1st Earl of Falmouth; 1787–1841	Rev. Hon. John Boscawen; 1790–1851
George Boscawen; 2nd Earl of Falmouth; 1811–1852	Evelyn Boscawen; 6th Viscount Falmouth; 1819–1889
Earldom extinct
Evelyn Boscawen; 7th Viscount Falmouth; 1847–1918
Evelyn Boscawen; 8th Viscount Falmouth; 1887–1962
Hon. Evelyn Boscawen; 1916–1940	George Boscawen; 9th Viscount Falmouth; 1919–2022
Evelyn Boscawen; 10th Viscount Falmouth born 1955
Hon. Evelyn Boscawen born 1979
Evelyn Boscawen born 2015

== See also ==
- Baron le Despencer
- Earl of Falmouth
