= Samuel Trefusis =

English politician

Samuel Trefusis (1676 – 1724) was an English Tory politician who sat as MP for Penryn from 1698 till 1713 and 15 March 1714 till 1722.

He was born into the noble Trefusis family, and baptised on 6 October 1676. He was the second son of Francis Trefusis and Bridget, the daughter of Robert Rolle. He was educated at St. Edmund Hall, Oxford and graduated in 1695. On 13 December 1702, he married Alice, the daughter of Sir Robert Cotton and they had one son and one daughter. On 9 July 1719, he married Margaret, the daughter of James Craggs I.
