= Chattisham =

Village and civil parish in Suffolk, England

Coordinates: 52.038°N 1.049°E

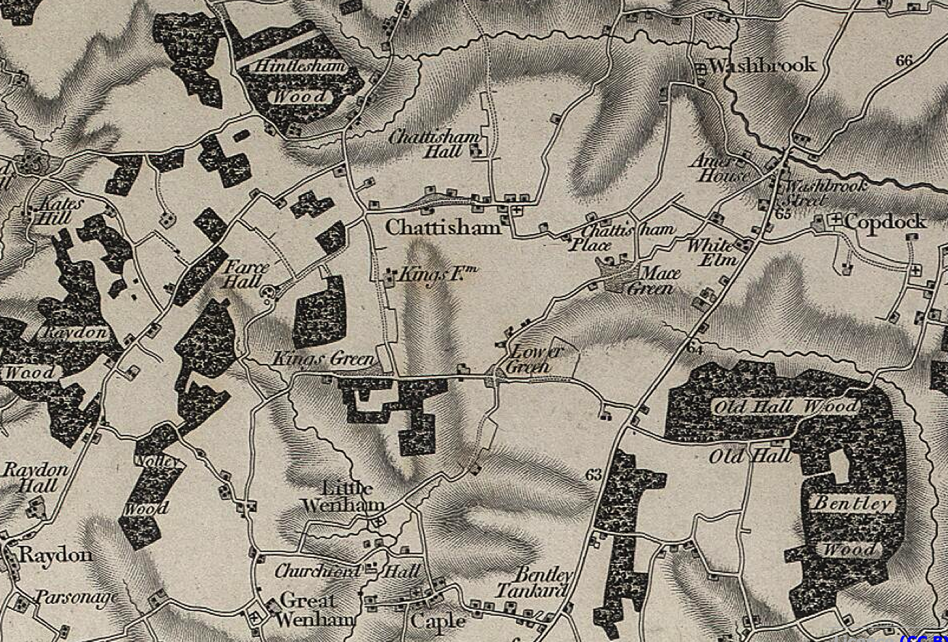
- Chattisham, Suffolk 1856

- Location within Suffolk
- Area: 2.95 km^{2} (1.14 sq mi)
- Population: 167 (2011)
  - Density: 57/km^{2} (150/sq mi)
- OS grid reference: TM092420
- District: Babergh
- Shire county: Suffolk
- Region: East
- Country: England
- Sovereign state: United Kingdom
- Post town: Ipswich
- Postcode district: IP8
- Dialling code: 01473

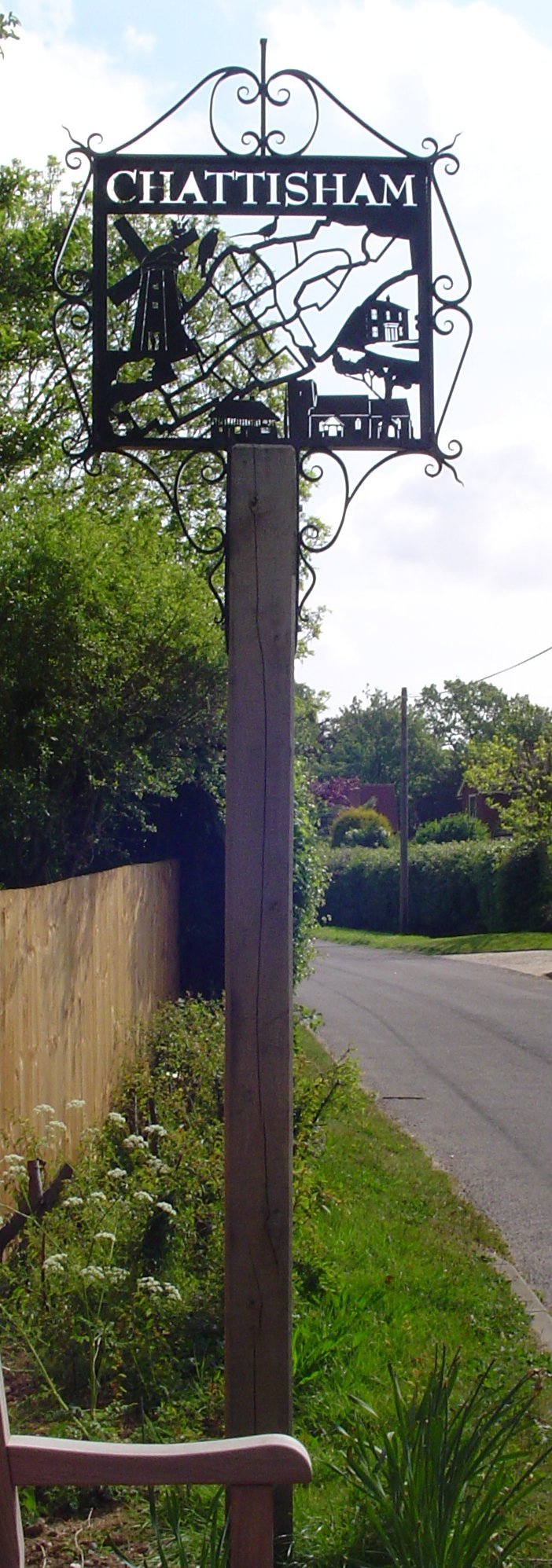
Village sign in Chattisham

Chattisham is a village and civil parish in Suffolk, England. Located around two miles west of Ipswich and half a mile south of the A1071, it is part of Babergh district. In 2006 its population was 140, increasing to 167 at the 2011 Census. It is in the Belstead Brook electoral division of Suffolk County Council. In the early 1870s, Chattisham was portrayed as: "CHATTISHAM, a parish in Samford district, Suffolk; 2¼ miles NE of Raydon r. station, and 5 SW by W of Ipswich. Post town, Ipswich. Acres, 713. Real property, £1, 427. Pop., 192. Houses, 47. The property is divided among a few. The living is a vicarage in the Diocese of Norwich. Value, £168.* Patron, Eton College. The church has a brass of 1592; and is good. There are a Wesleyan chapel, and charities £6."

== Population ==
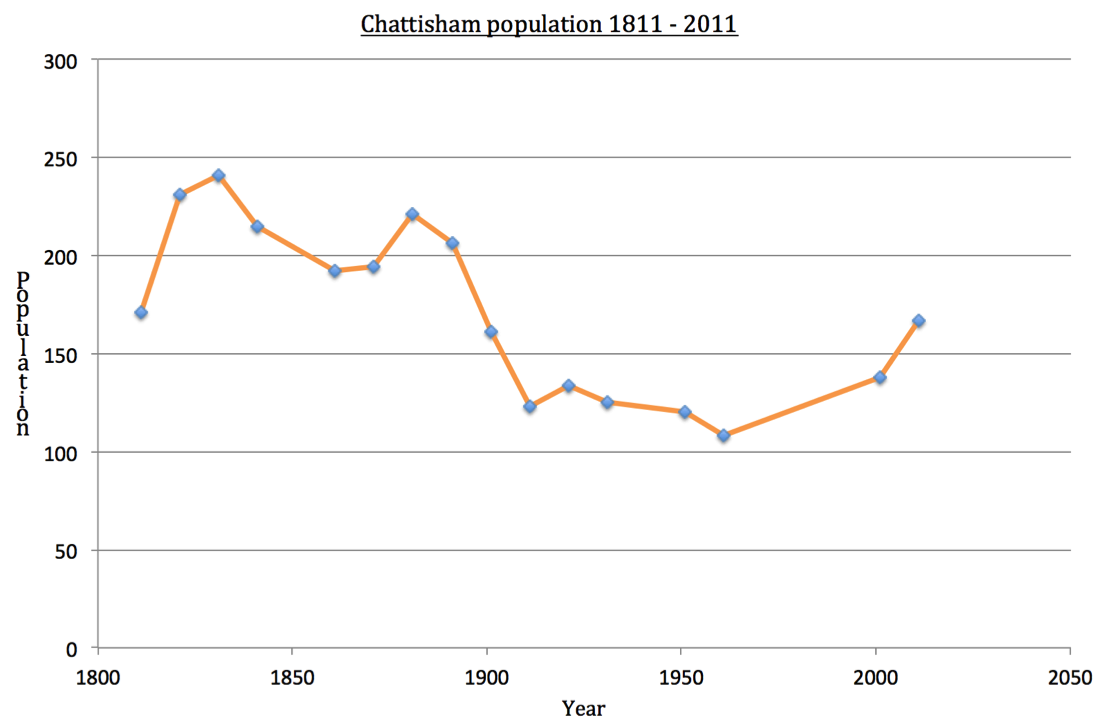
Chattisham population 1811–2011

Chattisham ethnicity

Chattisham had a population of "167" according to the 2011 census."Chattisham can be considered less ethnically diverse than the UK average." Approximately 86% of the UK's population is white. In Chattisham, the white population accounts for 98% of the total population. There are four main ethnic groups in Chattisham including, white, mixed ethnicity, Indian and other Asian. Down below are the numbers for each section of ethnic group within Chattisham.

White: 163, Mixed ethnicity: 1, Indian: 2, Other Asian: 1, Total population: 167

Country of birth has a variation in Chattisham, with 146 people born in England, 4 born in Wales, 8 born in Scotland, 2 in the European union and 7 people born in other parts of the world. The people of Chattisham also have different beliefs in terms of religion. These beliefs have been categorised into five main sections, as stated below. Christian: 116, No religion: 29, Hindu: 2, Other religion: 3, Not stated: 17, Total: 167 Since 1811, the population of Chattisham has encountered a fluctuation in numbers. The main trend of population data has a negative correlation, occurring overtime. The highest population recorded from the 1811 to 2011 censuses, was in 1831, with a population of 241 people. The lowest point in population numbers occurred in 1961, with the population being 108 people.

== Housing ==
Housing types in Chattisham:

Detached: 56, Semi- detached: 10, Terraced: 1, Flat (purpose built): 0, Flat (converted): 3 Total: 70 Housing Tenures: Owned outright: 32, owned with mortgage: 28, Shared ownership: 0, Rented from council: 1, Rented other social: 0, Rented private landlord: 7, Rented other: 1, Rent free: 0

Total: 69

The statistics for Chattisham's housing types and tenure's were taken from the 2011 census. The area contains many detached houses, with a number of '56'. Chattisham contains no 'Flat (purpose built)' buildings and only 1 'Terraced' house. The 'Owned outright' category stands as the highest within the tenure listings. 'Shared ownership', 'Rented other social' and 'Rent free' were the lowest in the 2011 census, as these housing tenures did not exist in Chattisham. The housing statistics potentially illustrate that Chattisham has a stable economy.

== Occupations and Economic activity ==
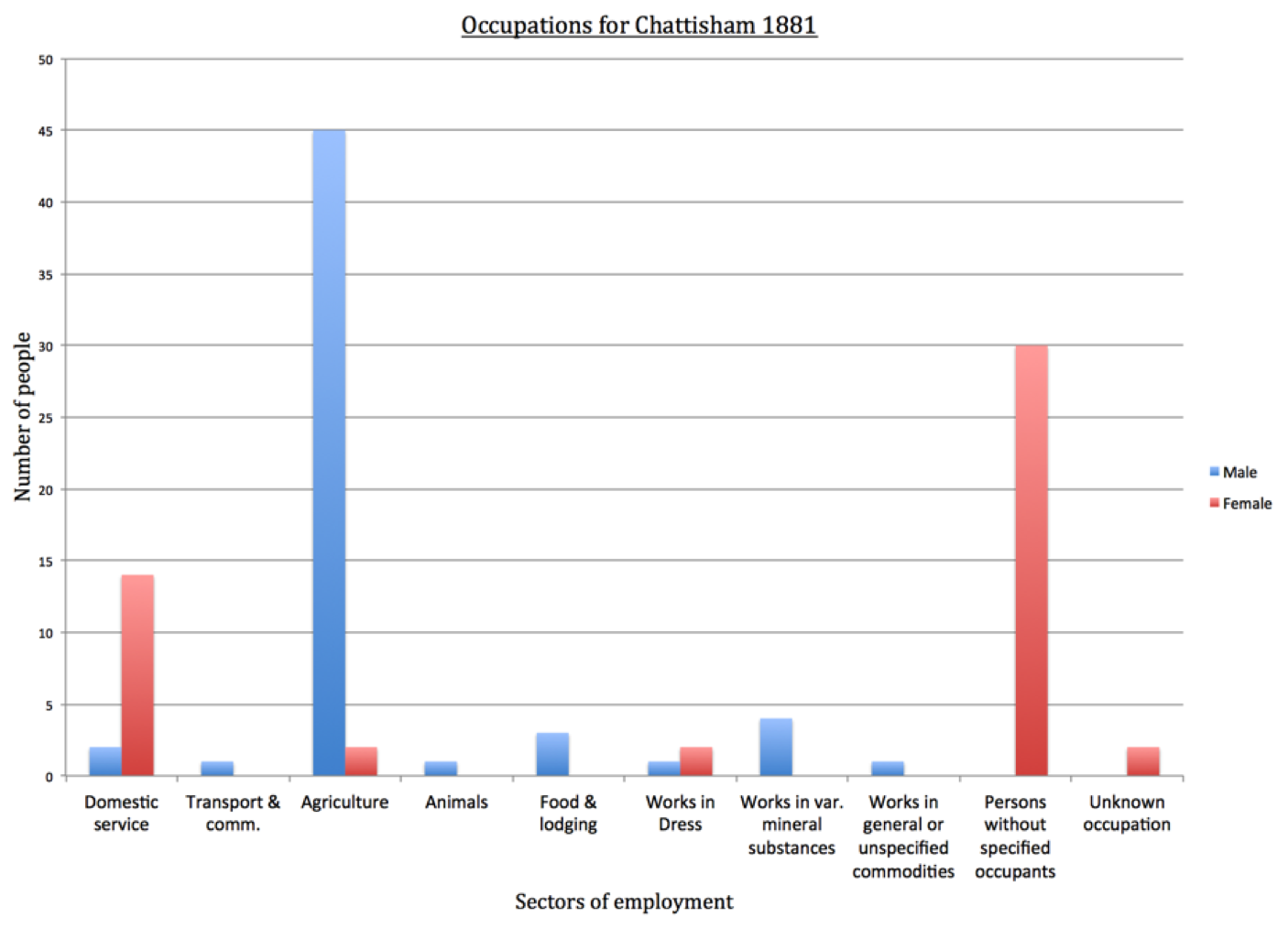
Occupational statistics for Chattisham, Suffolk 1881

The population of Chattisham's economic activity

Sectors of employment for the population of Chattisham

Overtime, the population of Chattisham has had a diverse range in job roles, as portrayed in the 1881 and 2011 data sets. From the 2011 census data of Chattisham, one person was unemployed. This can be seen as a positive for the village, as the other 127 people are involved in full/part-time jobs, study, care and retirement. This data does not include people under the age of 16. As shown in the 2011 employment industry chart, retail and manufacturing have the highest proportion of people. The industries with the lowest proportion of people include, 'Public administration & defence' and 'other'. This data set is based on resident's aged 16 to 74, on the 2011 census. The occupational statistics for 1881, suggest that 'agriculture' had the highest number of workers in total than any other sector. The agricultural sector mainly consisted of male workers, with an approximation of '45 males'. In 1881, '30 women' were under the sector 'Persons without specified occupants. In the late 1800s women were expected to stay at home while the men worked in labour based jobs, this is shown in the occupational graphs.

== Education ==
There is a variation in qualifications achieved in Chattisham's population. Statistics for the qualifications achieved are taken from the 2011 census and are as shown. Degree or similar: 50, Apprenticeship: 1, 2+ A levels: 18, 5+ GCSEs an A level or 1–2 AS levels: 24, 1–4 GCSEs: 17, No GCSEs: 21, Other: 9 Total: 140

As illustrated above the majority of residents within Chattisham have a degree or similar. Apprenticeships have the lowest number of residents, with only one person in the sector. Chattisham is served by Hintlesham and Chattisham Church of England Voluntary Controlled Primary School, a voluntary controlled school located in Hintlesham, England where 85 pupils ranging from 5–11 years of age attend. The school has 24.6 pupils per teacher pupils for each teacher, which is among the lowest of most schools. The students have earned a KS2 average point score of 31.8, putting them on the higher end of all schools."

== Church ==
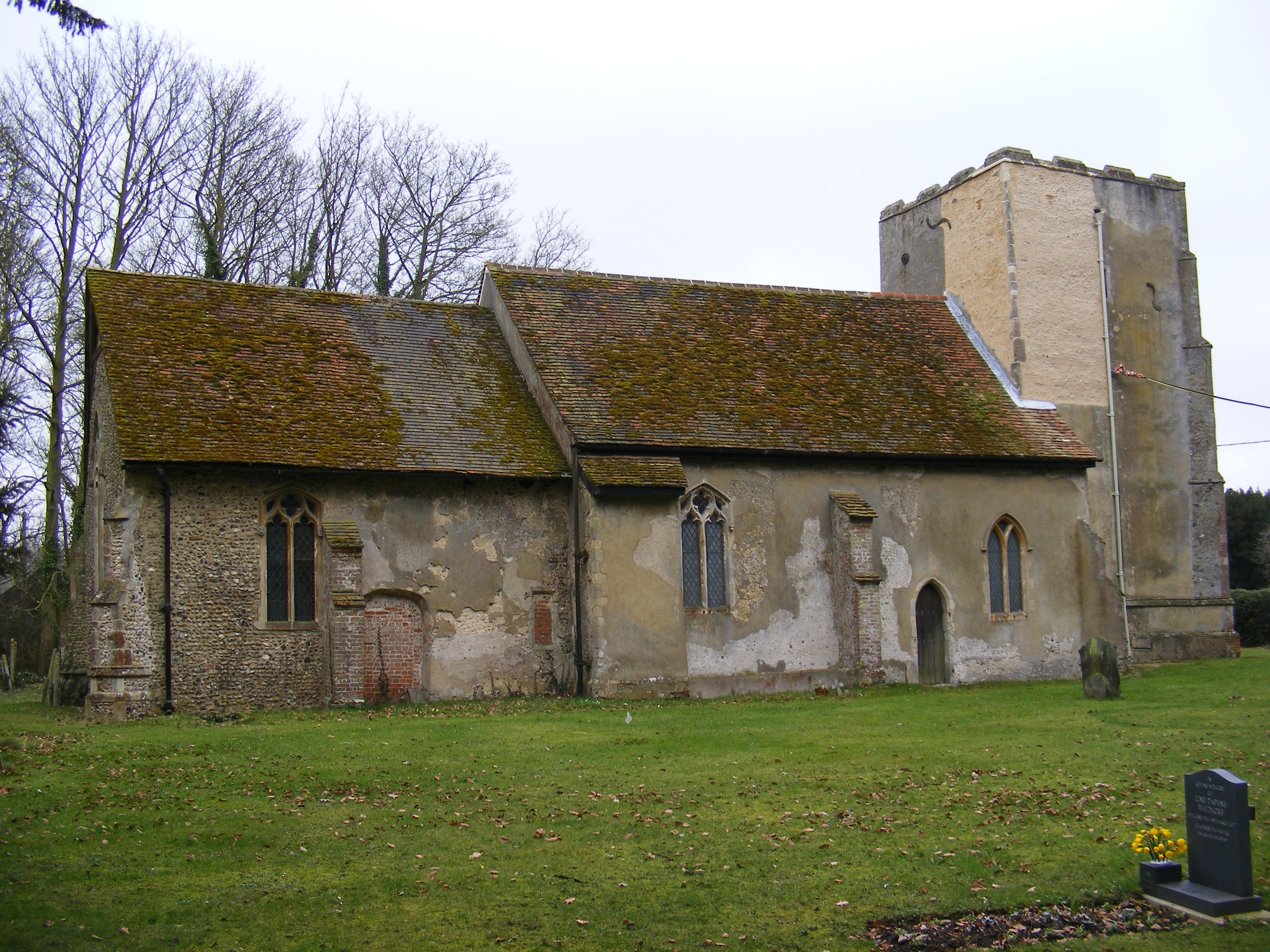
All Saints’ & St Margaret’s Church, Chattisham

All Saints’ and St Margaret's Church, located in Chattisham, has a historical essence and has been well respected for many centuries. The church is a grade II listed building and dates back to the 14th century. Throughout the ages the church has been damaged and restored. The top half of the tower was removed for safety reasons, as the structure had become frail. The exterior wall surrounding the west window of the church has been restored with red bricks showing through the previous cement render. It is visible to see each past restoration throughout the structure, as several parts are assembled together. The majority of restoration work took place in the 18th and 19th century, which has remained to this present day. Chattisham's church is a joint parish with Hintlesham church and has been for 350 years. "The churches stand a mile apart from each other, separated by a valley of meadows and woods." Regular fundraising events help with the maintenance and restoration of the church. In addition, this enables it to function properly and have a key role within Chattisham.
