= Calcutta Historical Society =

Indian nonprofit organization

- Formation: 27 April 1907; 119 years ago
- Type: Nonprofit
- Location: Calcutta, West Bengal, India
- Publication: Bengal, Past & Present

The Calcutta Historical Society is an Indian nonprofit learned society. Founded in 1907, it is dedicated to the preservation and promotion of the cultural heritage of Calcutta (now Kolkata). The society has contributed to the study and understanding of Indian history, particularly the history of Kolkata, through its publication Bengal, Past & Present. It is the oldest historical association in South Asia. The society is based in Calcutta, West Bengal, India.

== History ==
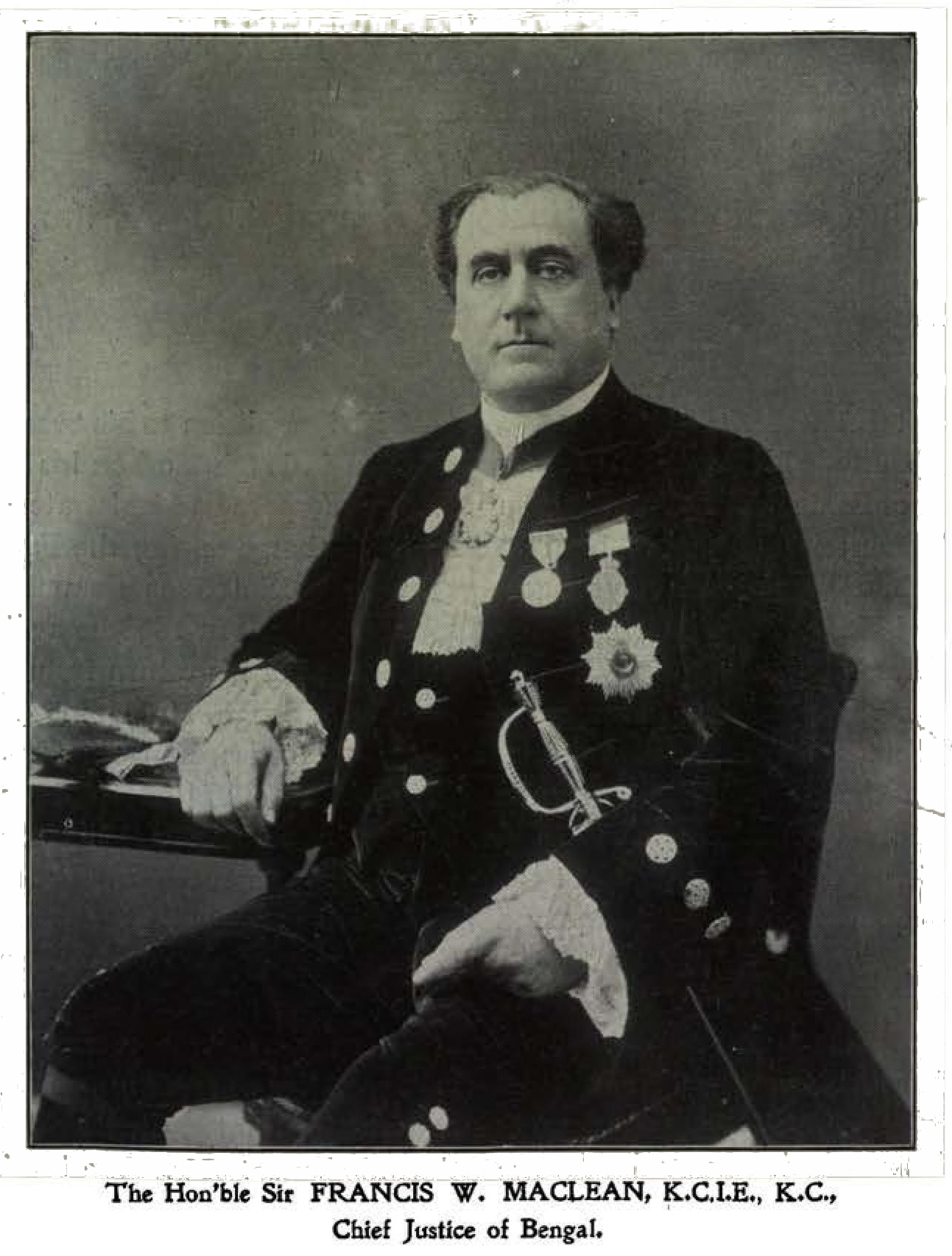
The Honorable Sir Francis Maclean, first president of the society

The Calcutta Historical Society is a learned society founded on 27 April 1907 at the Calcutta Town Hall in Calcutta (now Kolkata). Its founders included almost eighty of the leading Englishmen of the city. The society was "formed to preserve ancient and historical Institutions in Calcutta and its environs". Its founders focused on preserving historical monuments and buildings, and the ancient institutions of the city. The society's first president was Sir Francis Maclean, the chief justice of the Calcutta High Court.

In 1910, society members began a successful search for the grave of Walter Landor Dickens, son of the author Charles Dickens. Dickens's son died in India while serving with the 42nd Highlanders. On June 18, 1911, the Calcutta Historical Society installed a bust of William Makepeace Thackeray, at St. John's Church in Calcutta, where the author was baptized. The society commissioned the bust from London sculptor Leonard Jennings for the centennial of Thackeray's birth in Calcutta. The Royal Academy in London received a replica of the bust. The society held a dinner to celebrate the 218th anniversary of the founding of Calcutta on August 25, 1911.

The society's activities ceased by the end of 1911 as its leading members were transferred out of India. The society discussed a merger with the Asiatic Society of Bengal, but decided to close its offices in May 1912. In May 1913, Wilmot Corfield, the society's former treasurer, made a presentation to the East India Association in Westminster, England where he proposed forming the Calcutta Historical Society in London, along with establishing of an Indian Hall and Museum in England to serve as an imperial monument to India. However, the society reformed in Calcutta at the rooms of the Asiatic Society on February 4, 1914, under the leadership of president Lawrence Hugh Jenkins.

The Calcutta Historic Society is a nonprofit organization and is the oldest historical association in South Asia. The society is based in Calcutta, West Bengal, India.

== Publications ==
The society established a magazine at its first meeting and began publishing the journal, Bengal, Past & Present, in July 1907. Historian and researcher Walter K. Firminger, was the first editor of Bengal, Past & Present. Firminger defined the journal's early vision and direction of preserving "the British memory of Calcutta as the seat of the British Empire in India." Thus, its articles focused on the institutions and buildings from the era of colonialism. As history emerged as a profession and a discipline in the region's universities, the journal changed into a scholarly journal about Asian history and modern India, edited by professional historians such as Pratul Chandra Gupta and Narendra Krishna Sinha. Peter Gran, professor of history at Temple University, notes that Bengal, Past & Present was a "high-quality" journal that contributed to Calcutta's importance in professional history. The journal was published through 2012.

In 1925, the society republished The Original Letters from India 1779-1815 by Eliza Fay.

== Notable members ==
- Wilmot Corfield, philatelist
- Evan Cotton, presided over the Indian National Congress, member of Calcutta Municipal Corporation, and lawyer
- Walter K. Firminger, Archdeacon of Calcutta, editor, and historian
- Pratul Chandra Gupta, historian
- Syed Hossain, journalist and Indian activist
- Lawrence Hugh Jenkins, British judge in India
- Bijay Chand Mahtab, Maharaja of Bardhaman, ruler of Burdwan Estate, Bengal Presidency in British India
- Wasif Ali Mirza, Nawab of Murshidabad
- Ashutosh Mukherjee, Vice Chancellor of Calcutta University, founder of the university's law school, and chief justice of the Calcutta High Court
- Rajendra Nath Mookerjee, pioneering industrialist
- Prodyot Coomar Tagore, Maharaja Bahadur

== See also ==
- The Asiatic Society
- Asiatic Society of Bangladesh
- The Asiatic Society of Mumbai
