= Charnwood =

Charnwood may refer to:

== Leicestershire, England ==
- Borough of Charnwood, a local government district
- Charnwood (UK Parliament constituency), in the House of Commons
- Charnwood (ward), an electoral ward and administrative division in Leicester
- Charnwood College, Loughborough
- Charnwood Forest, within the borough

== Other uses ==
- Operation Charnwood, a Second World War Anglo-Canadian operation during the Battle of Normandy that captured northern Caen
- Charnwood, Australian Capital Territory, a suburb of Canberra, Australia
- The Barons Charnwood, barons in the Peerage of the United Kingdom
  - Godfrey Benson, 1st Baron Charnwood (1864–1945), British politician and biographer of Abraham Lincoln and Theodore Roosevelt; known as Lord Charnwood
