= Wheate baronets =

Extinct baronetcy in the Baronetage of England

The Wheate Baronetcy, of Glympton in the County of Oxford, was a title in the Baronetage of England.

It was created on 2 May 1696 for Thomas Wheate, Member of Parliament for Woodstock. The second Baronet also represented this constituency in Parliament. The title became extinct on the death of the sixth Baronet in 1816.

The family seat was Glympton Park, Glympton, Oxfordshire.

== Wheate baronets, of Glympton (1696) ==
Escutcheon of the Wheate baronets of Glympton

- Sir Thomas Wheate, 1st Baronet (1667–1721)
- Sir Thomas Wheate, 2nd Baronet (1693–1746)
- Sir George Wheate, 3rd Baronet (c. 1700–1751)
- Sir George Wheate, 4th Baronet (died 1760)
- Sir Jacob Wheate, 5th Baronet (died 1783)
- Sir John Thomas Wheate, 6th Baronet (1749–1816)
