= Thomas Wheate =

Thomas Wheate may refer to:

- Sir Thomas Wheate, 1st Baronet, English landowner and politician
- Sir Thomas Wheate, 2nd Baronet, English politician
