= Wightwick (surname) =

Wightwick is an English surname. Notable people with the surname include:

- George Wightwick (1802–1872), British architect
- Richard Wightwick (c. 1547–1629), English clergyman, co-founder of Pembroke College, Oxford
