= Charles Crisp =

Charles Crisp may refer to:

- Sir Charles Crisp, 5th Baronet, member of parliament for Woodstock
- Charles F. Crisp (1845–1896), US congressman from Georgia
- Charles R. Crisp (1870–1937), US representative from Georgia, son of Charles F. Crisp
