= Tracks in the Snow =

Tracks in the Snow may refer to:

- Tracks in the Snow (novel), a 1906 detective novel by Godfrey Benson
- Tracks in the Snow (1929 film), a German silent film
- Tracks in the Snow (1985 film), a Dutch drama film
