= Basil Scott =

British Indian judge

Sir Basil Scott
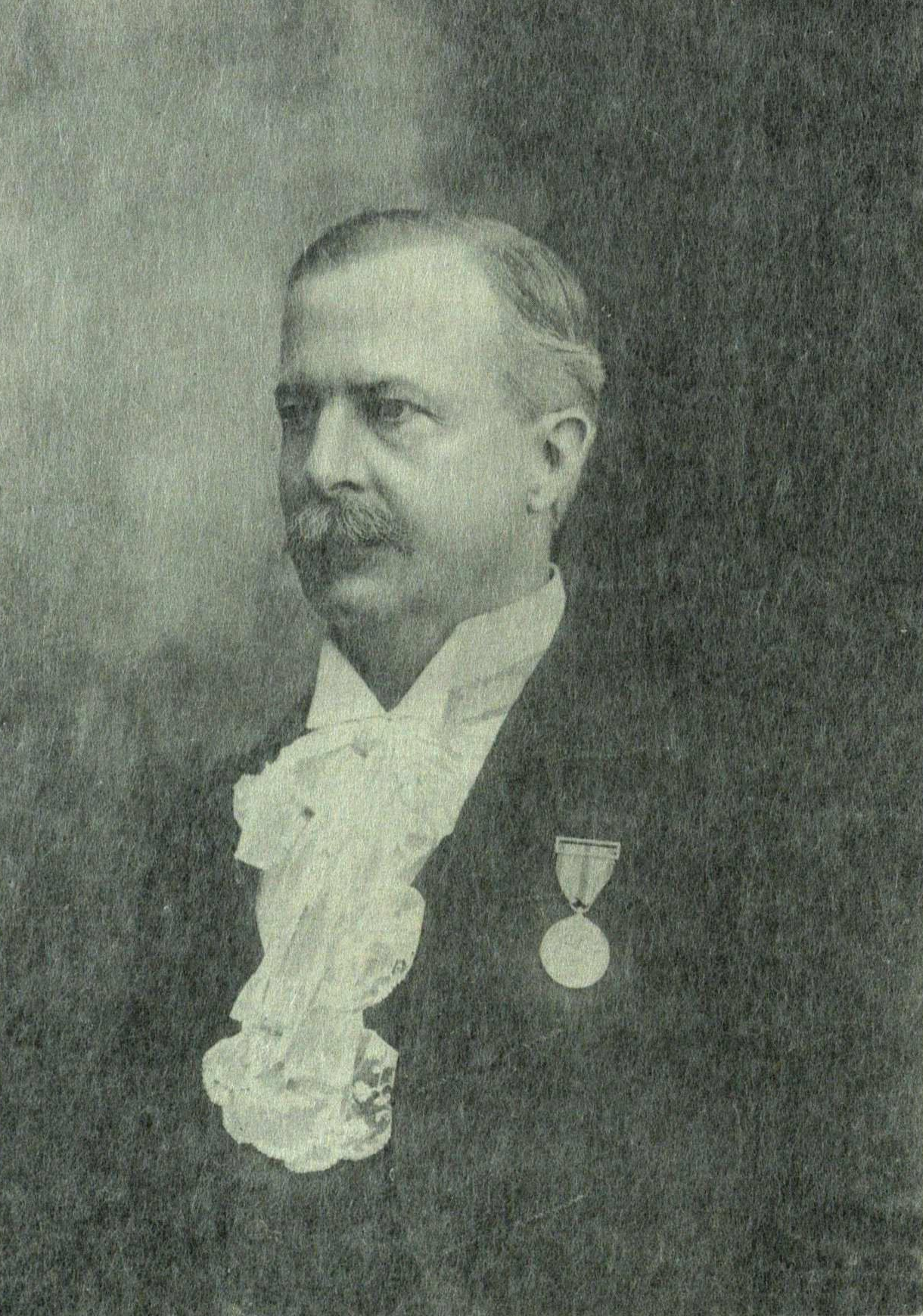

8th Chief Justice of Bombay High Court
- In office 22 April 1908 – 31 May 1919
- Appointed by: Edward VII
- Preceded by: Lawrence Hugh Jenkins
- Succeeded by: Norman Cranstoun Macleod

Advocate-General of Bombay
- In office 1903–1908
- Appointed by: Edward VII
- Preceded by: Basil Lang
- Succeeded by: Thomas Strangman

Acting Judge of Bombay High Court
- In office 1906
- Appointed by: Edward VII

Personal details
- Born: 1859
- Died: 1926 (aged 66–67)
- Relations: Basil Lang
- Parent: Henry Scott
- Education: B.A. and M.A.
- Alma mater: Balliol College, Oxford
- Occupation: Lawyer, Judge
- Profession: Chief Justice

Sir Basil Scott (1859 — 1926) was 8th Chief Justice of the Bombay High Court.

== Early life ==
Sir Basil Scott was the son of Henry Scott educated at Balliol College, Oxford. He passed B.A. in 1882 and M.A. in 1886. He was called to Bar Inner Temple and came out as a barrister to practice in the Bombay High Court in 1884.

== Career ==
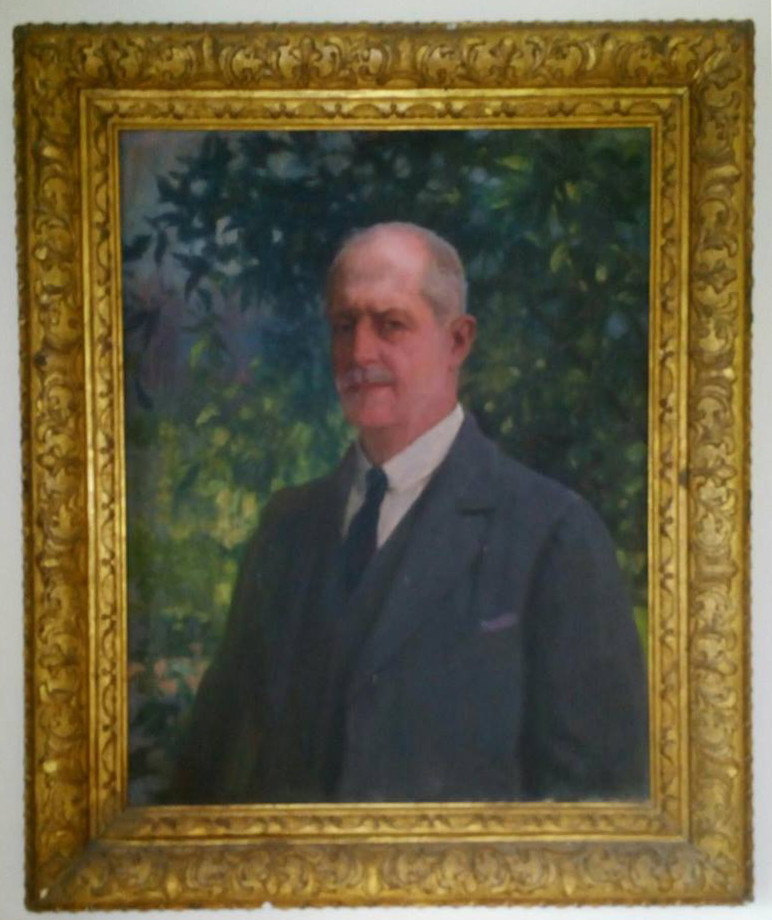

Scott's uncle Basil Lang was the Advocate General and leading in practitioner of the Bombay High Court. Scott became acting Advocate-General in 1899 and was also appointed permanent Advocate-General of Bombay. In 1906 he was elevated as Puisne Judge, and after retirement of Sir Lawrence Hugh Jenkins, appointed as Chief Justice on 22 April 1908. It is known that some of his decisions were reversed by the Privy Council and he had to some extent, the prevailing prejudices of the Anglo-Indians of his time. Scott was the member of the Rowlatt Commission and also the head of Special Tribunal under the Special Tribunal Act in 1910 to deal with the case against Vinayak Damodar Savarkar.
