= Henry Barnett (banker) =

British politician (1815–1896)

- Born: 14 February 1815
- Died: 5 May 1896 (aged 81); London
- Education: Eton College
- Alma mater: Christ Church, Oxford
- Occupations: banker, landowner, cricketer, politician
- Known for: MP for Woodstock 1865–74

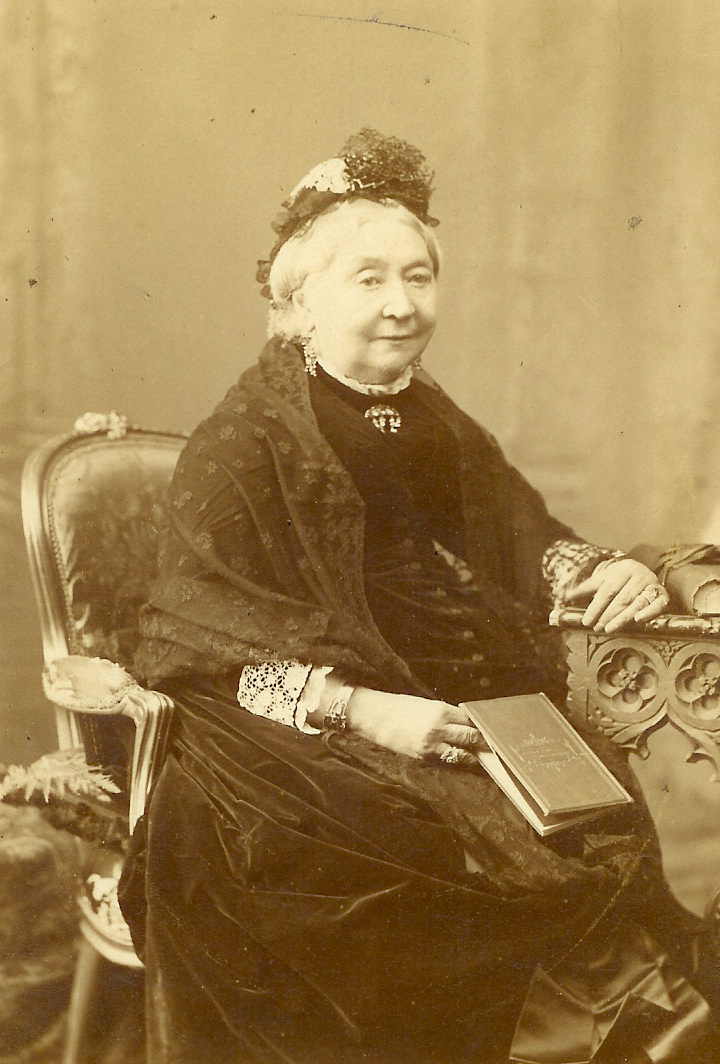
Emily Ann Barnett, née Stratton

Henry Barnett, MP, JP, DL (14 February 1815 – 5 May 1896) was an English banker, landowner, Conservative Party politician, and magistrate.

He lived at Glympton Park, near Woodstock, and was the son of George Henry Barnett (1780–1871) by his marriage to Elizabeth Canning (1777–1838), a first cousin of the prime minister George Canning.

Henry Barnett's education was at Eton and Christ Church, Oxford, and in his youth he was a cricketer.

He married Emily Ann Stratton on 18 September 1838; they had ten children, including the Reverend Herbert Walter Barnett who was Vicar of Bracknell 1886–1919.

He was an officer in the part-time Queen's Own Oxfordshire Hussars, being promoted to its command as Lieutenant-Colonel on 8 May 1866, and serving as its Honorary Colonel from 10 July 1878.

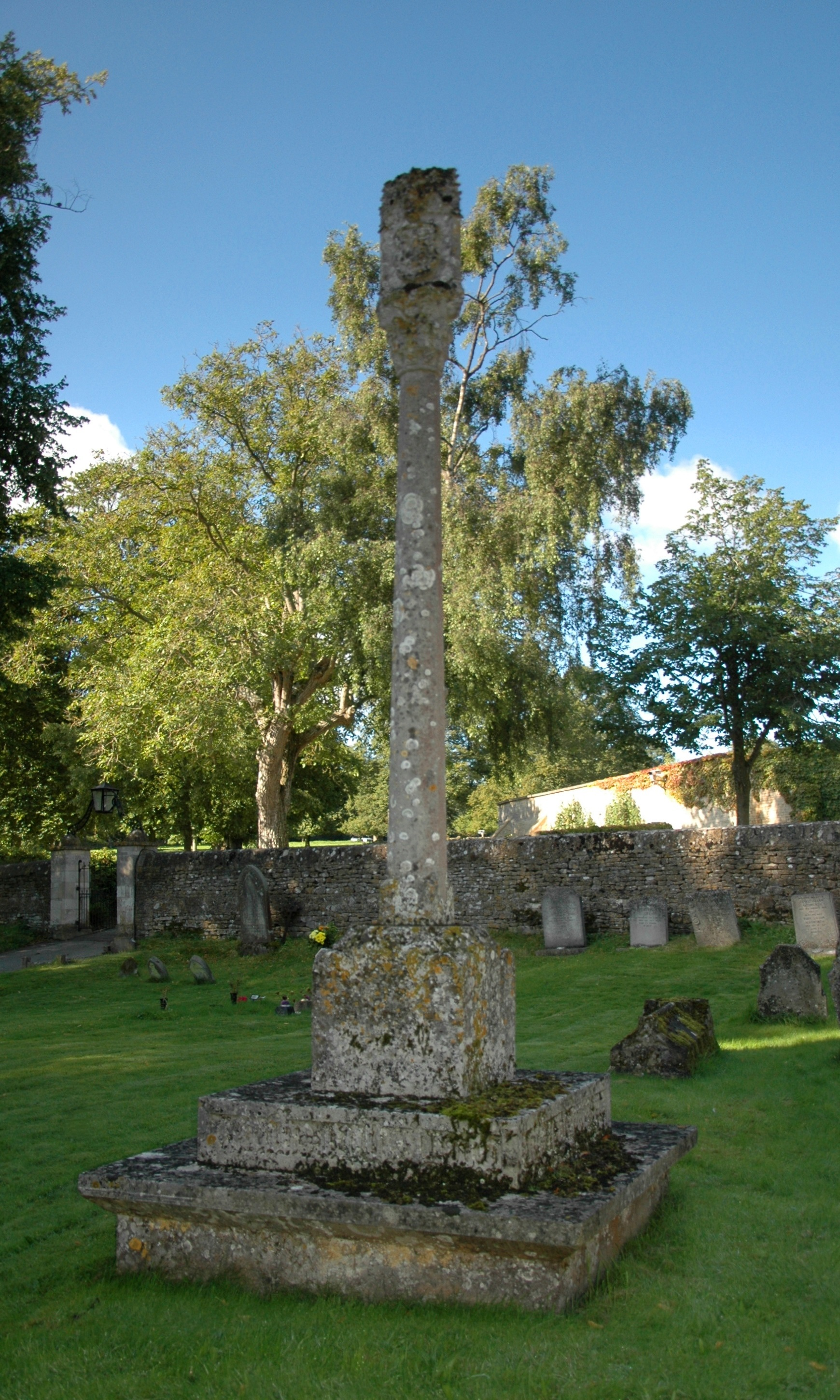
Churchyard cross at St Mary's parish church, Glympton, erected in 1897 as Henry Barnett's monument

He was a banker, Alderman of Oxfordshire, and at the 1865 general election was elected as the Member of Parliament for Woodstock, holding the seat until he stood down from the House of Commons at the 1874 general election.

Barnett played from 1836 to 1839, as a member of Marylebone Cricket Club, making four appearances and totalling 32 runs with a highest score of 17.

He was the principal partner of the bank Barnett, Hoares & Co. which in 1864 became part of Lloyds Bank. He purchased his mansion at 100, Hamilton Terrace, St John's Wood, in 1890.

He was born and died in London, but is buried at Glympton, Oxfordshire.

Parliament of the United Kingdom
Preceded by Lord Alfred Spencer-Churchill	Member of Parliament for Woodstock; 1865–1874	Succeeded by Lord Randolph Churchill
