= Glympton =

Village in Oxfordshire, England

Coordinates: 51.893°N 1.382°W

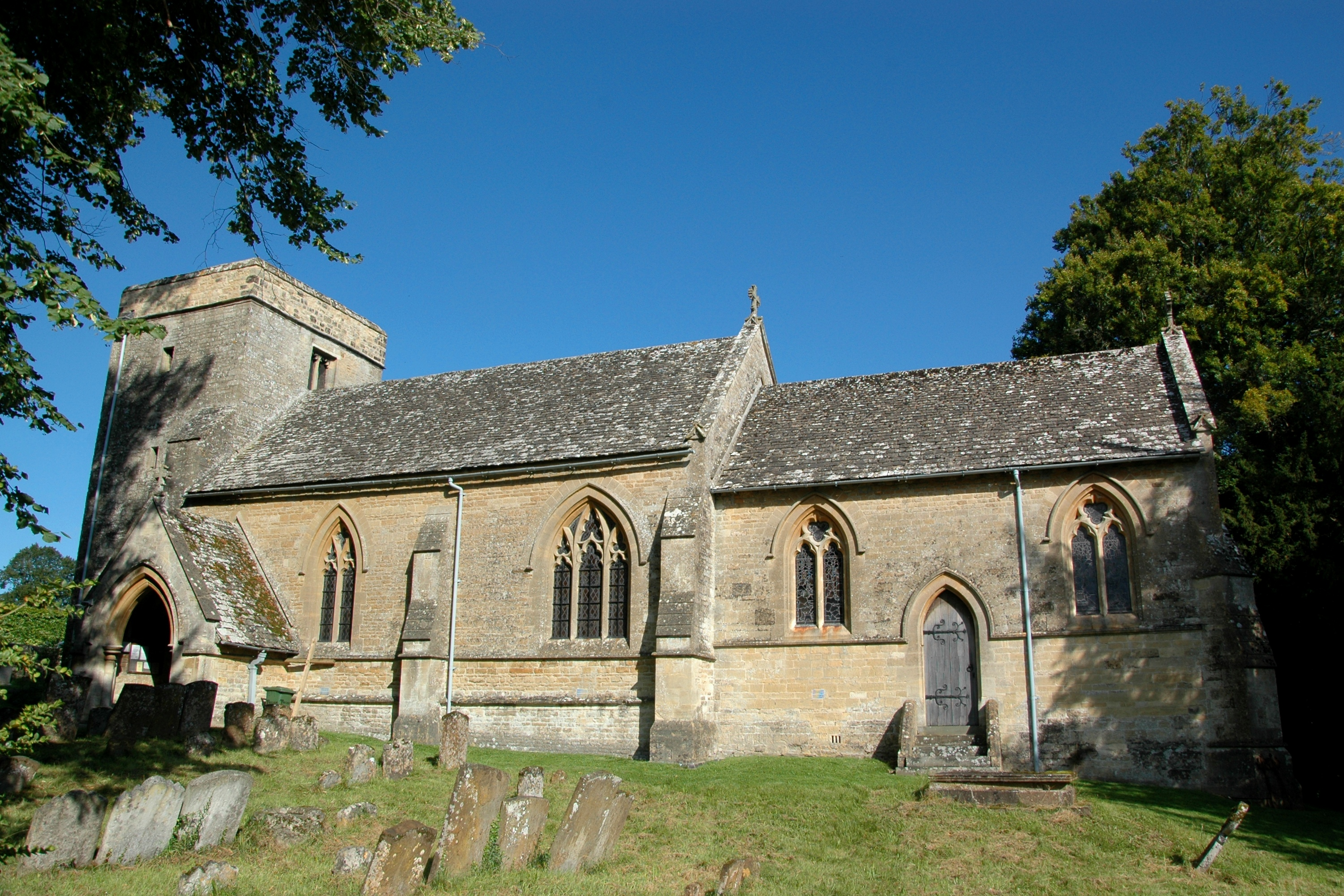
- St Mary's parish church

- Location within Oxfordshire
- Population: 80 (2001 Census)
- OS grid reference: SP4221
- Civil parish: Glympton
- District: West Oxfordshire
- Shire county: Oxfordshire
- Region: South East
- Country: England
- Sovereign state: United Kingdom
- Post town: Woodstock
- Postcode district: OX20
- Dialling code: 01993
- Police: Thames Valley
- Fire: Oxfordshire
- Ambulance: South Central
- UK Parliament: Bicester and Woodstock

Glympton is a village and civil parish on the River Glyme about 3 miles (5 km) north of Woodstock, Oxfordshire. The 2001 Census recorded the parish's population as 80. The village and church are owned by the Glympton Park estate.

== History ==
Grim's Ditch in the southern part of the parish, just north of Grim's Dyke Farm, was dug in the 1st century. The surviving section is about 1,100 yards (1 km) long and is a scheduled monument.

The first known record of Glympton's existence is a charter from about 1050 in which it is given as a witness's address. In the reign of King Edward the Confessor, Wulfward the White, a thegn of Edward's consort Queen Edith, held the manor of Glympton. Wulfward survived the Norman conquest of England but by 1086 King William I had granted the manor to Geoffrey de Montbray, Bishop of Coutances. By 1122 Geoffrey de Clinton, chamberlain of Henry I of England held the manor.

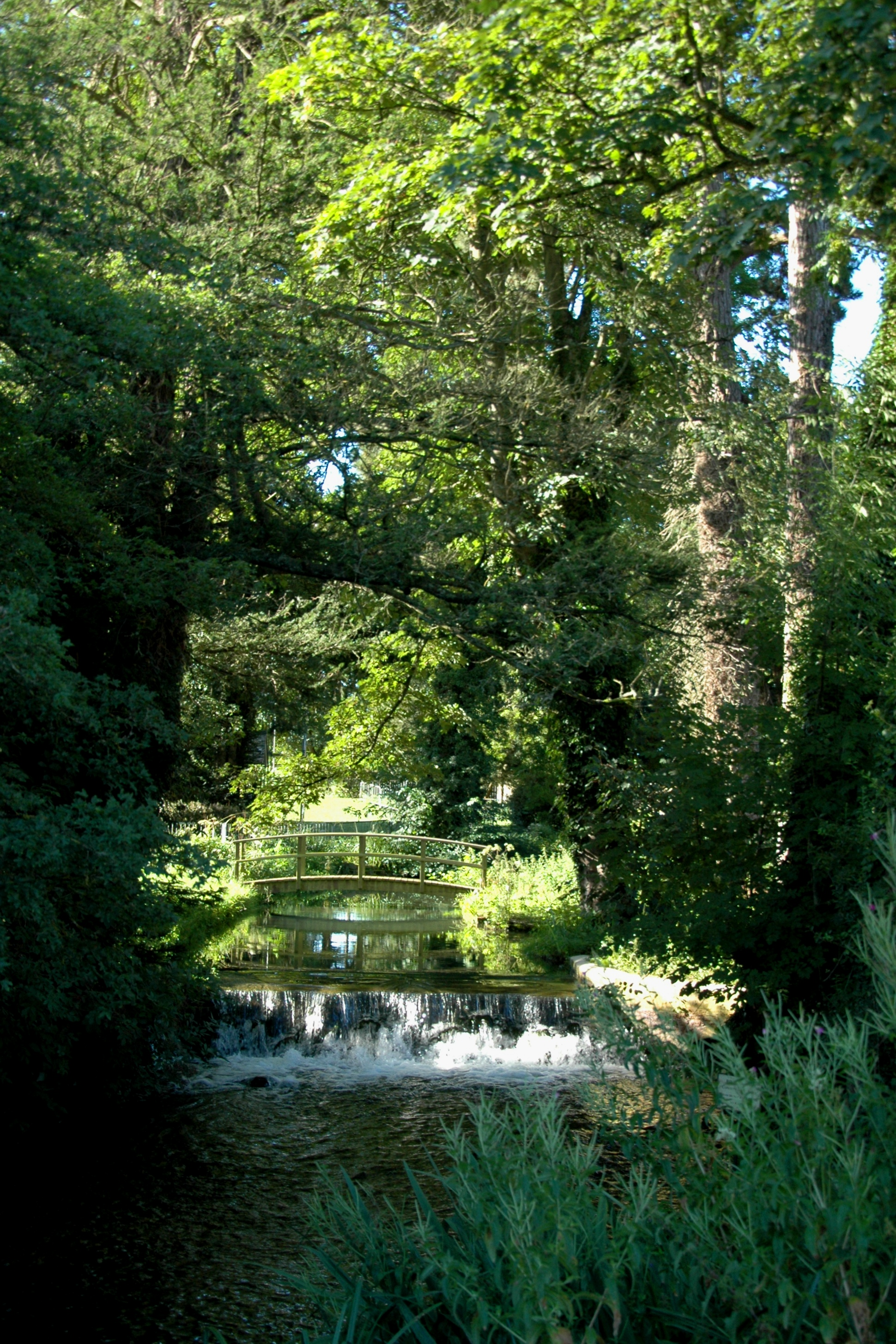
The River Glyme at Glympton

Both the Domesday Book of 1086 and the Hundred Rolls of 1279 record Glympton as having a watermill. The mill was rebuilt in 1292 and 1326, but by 1362 was in such disrepair as to be worthless. In 1632 Glympton was said to have two mills but in 1659 there was only one. It was last recorded in 1724 and had gone by 1767. In 1154 woodland in the south of the parish was taken into the royal forest of Wychwood. To some extent this was disafforested in about 1300. At about the same time villagers expanded their fields by assarting, which is the process of clearing woodland for cultivation. At least 23 acres (9 ha) of assart land changed hands in 1322, by 1426 one of the manors had 46 acres (19 ha) of assart land, and in 1631 the parish's assarts were estimated at 500 acres (200 ha). Fields or furlongs with names ending in "-ley" suggest an origin as assarts, including Lutches Ley, Edamesley, and Bradeley. The name of Glympton Assarts Farm, about 1 mile (1.6 km) south of the village, is further evidence that villagers assarted southwards into the Wychwood.

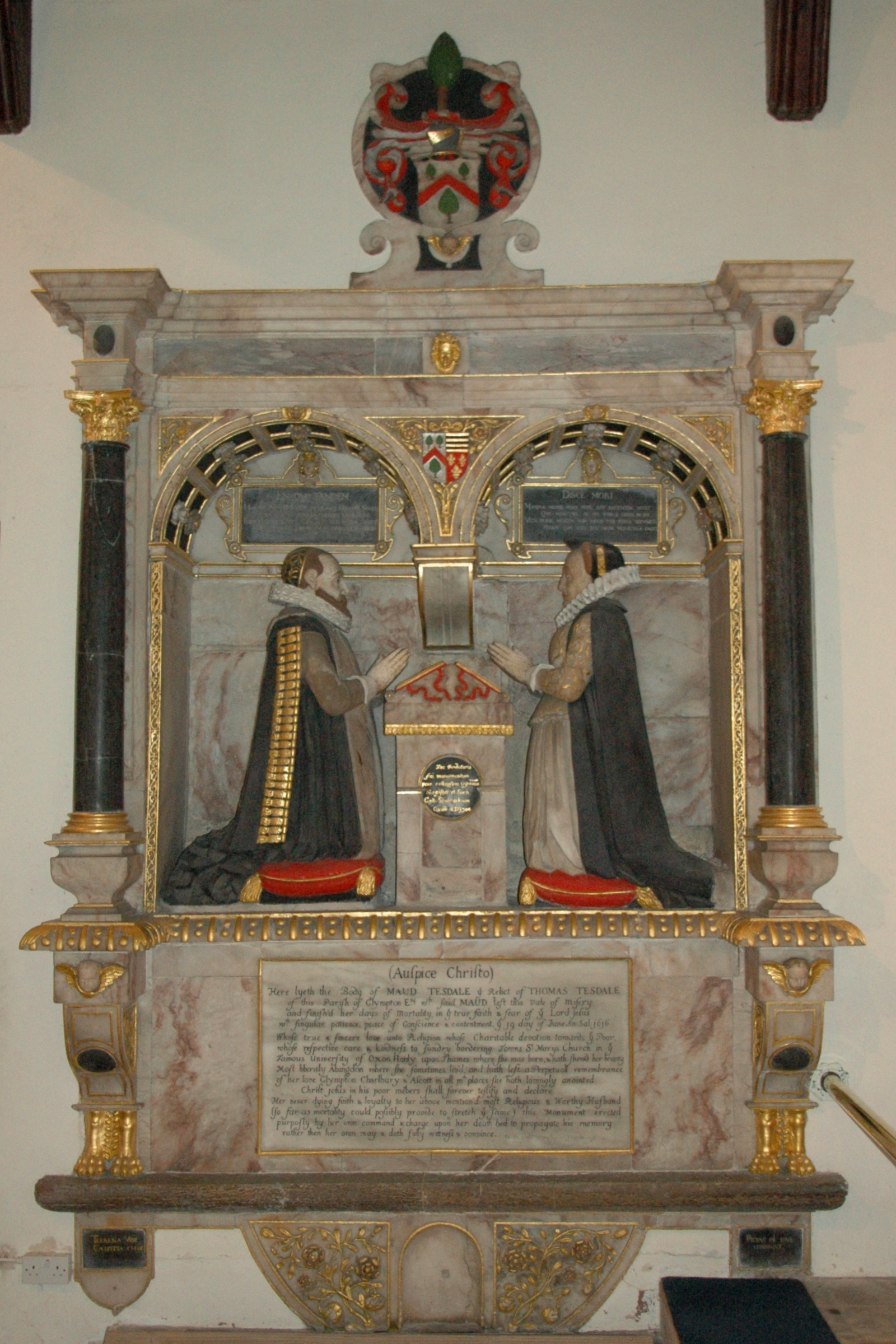
Alabaster monument to Thomas and Maud Tesdale in St Mary's chancel

From about 1585 Thomas Tesdale of Abingdon leased the manor from the Cupper family who had held it since John Cupper bought it in 1547. Tesdale was a maltster, but at Glympton he raised cattle and grew woad for dyeing. Tesdale died in 1610 leaving £5,000 for scholarships and fellowships from Abingdon School to Balliol College, Oxford. His widow Maud Tesdale died in 1616. Thomas is commemorated by a brass memorial on the chancel floor in St Nicholas' parish church. He and Maud are also commemorated by an alabaster double monument set into the north wall of the chancel, in which almost life-size effigies of the couple kneel opposite each other at a prayer desk.

In 1633 the manor was bought by William Wheate, whose grandson Thomas Wheate was created a baronet in 1696. The Wheate Baronetcy became extinct on the death of the 6th Baronet in 1816, but the family and their descendants continued to hold the estate until 1944. In the Second World War Major Frank Wheate Barnett (1906–40) was a staff officer in the King's Royal Rifle Corps and died of wounds at the Battle of Dunkirk on 2 June 1940.

Glympton village used to be grouped around the parish church. However, William Wheate moved the entire village about 1/4 mile (400 m) southeast to make way for the landscaping of Glympton Park, apparently in the 1630s or 1640s, leaving the parish church isolated in its original position. The gate lodge to Glympton Park was probably built at this time, and despite a restoration in 1880 the lodge remains essentially a 17th-century house. Glympton Park is a country house that was built for the Wheate family in the 18th century. At the same time the River Glyme was dammed to form the lake in the park. Apart from the parish church, no trace remains of the original village. Of the relocated 17th century village none of the original houses survives either. One 18th century inn survives as a private house. All the remaining houses in the relocated village were either remodelled in the 19th century or built new in the 20th century.

Glympton's farmland was enclosed earlier than that of many other parishes. There were records of some enclosures having taken place by the early parts of the 14th, 15th and 17th centuries. After William Wheate bought the manor in 1633 he began enclosing the remainder, and after 1690 Sir Thomas Wheate, 1st Baronet completed the process by agreement with his tenants. The main road through Glympton was once part of the main road between London and Aberystwyth. It and the Oxford — Stratford-upon-Avon main road through the parish were made into turnpikes in 1729. Both roads ceased to be turnpikes in 1878. Since the 1920s the road has been classified as the B4027 and the Oxford – Stratford road has been the A44.

Glympton's first record of a public house is from 1648. By 1780 it had two inns, the Pole Axe and the Swan, presumably deriving some of their trade from the then turnpike roads passing through the parish. The Pole Axe had closed by 1784 and The Swan in about 1853. In the 18th century a Middle Jurassic limestone, possibly part of the Taynton Limestone Formation, was quarried at Glympton and used to build parts of Glympton Park house and Blenheim Palace. It had poor resistance to frost, so at Blenheim John Vanbrugh used it only for internal walls or for backing external walls that were faced with better stone. If it was used originally for facing at Glympton Park, it must have been replaced when the house was rebuilt in 1849, as its facing is now entirely in Bath stone. The village school was built in 1849 and became a Church of England School in 1903. It was reorganised as a junior school in 1922 and closed in 1932. In 1950 the building was converted into the village hall.

By 1869 Glympton had 22 cottages. A government report found them to be soundly built, let at a rent of 30 shillings per year, and "often paid for by selling the product of the apricot tree planted against the side of their houses". The village post office was opened in 1887 and continues to serve the village. In 1949 the owner of Glympton Park had a row of four almshouses built at Glympton. When their site was being prepared, a hoard of coins from the reigns of James I and Charles I was found, possibly dating from the English Civil War. In 1646 Royalist troops requisitioned food and carts from the village and in 1648 up to 50 Parliamentarian soldiers were billeted here.

Prince Bandar bin Sultan of Saudi Arabia owned Glympton Park and its estate from 1992 to 2021, when it was sold to the King of Bahrain, Hamad bin Isa Al Khalifa.

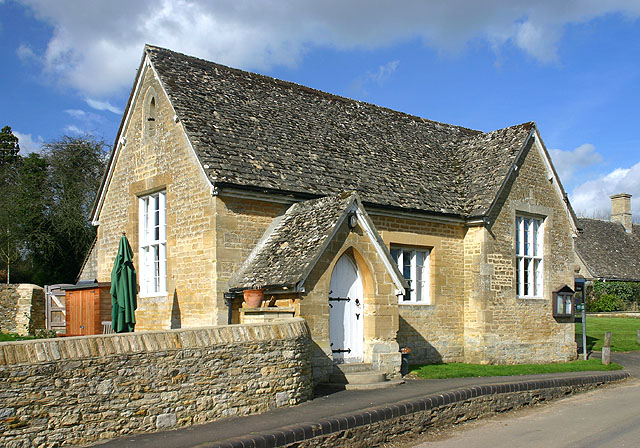
Former school at Glympton, now the village hall

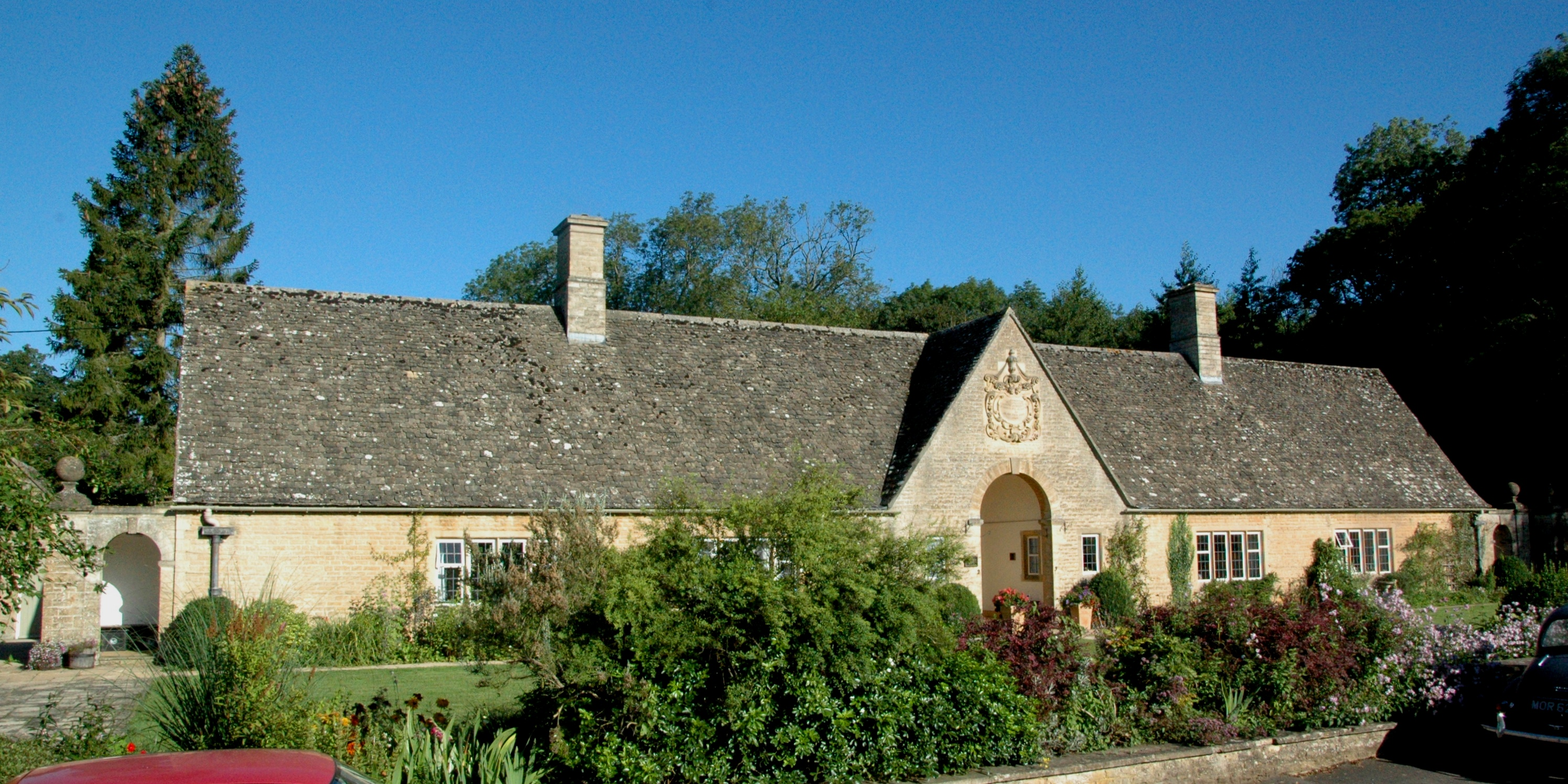
Glympton Almshouses, built in 1949

== Parish church ==
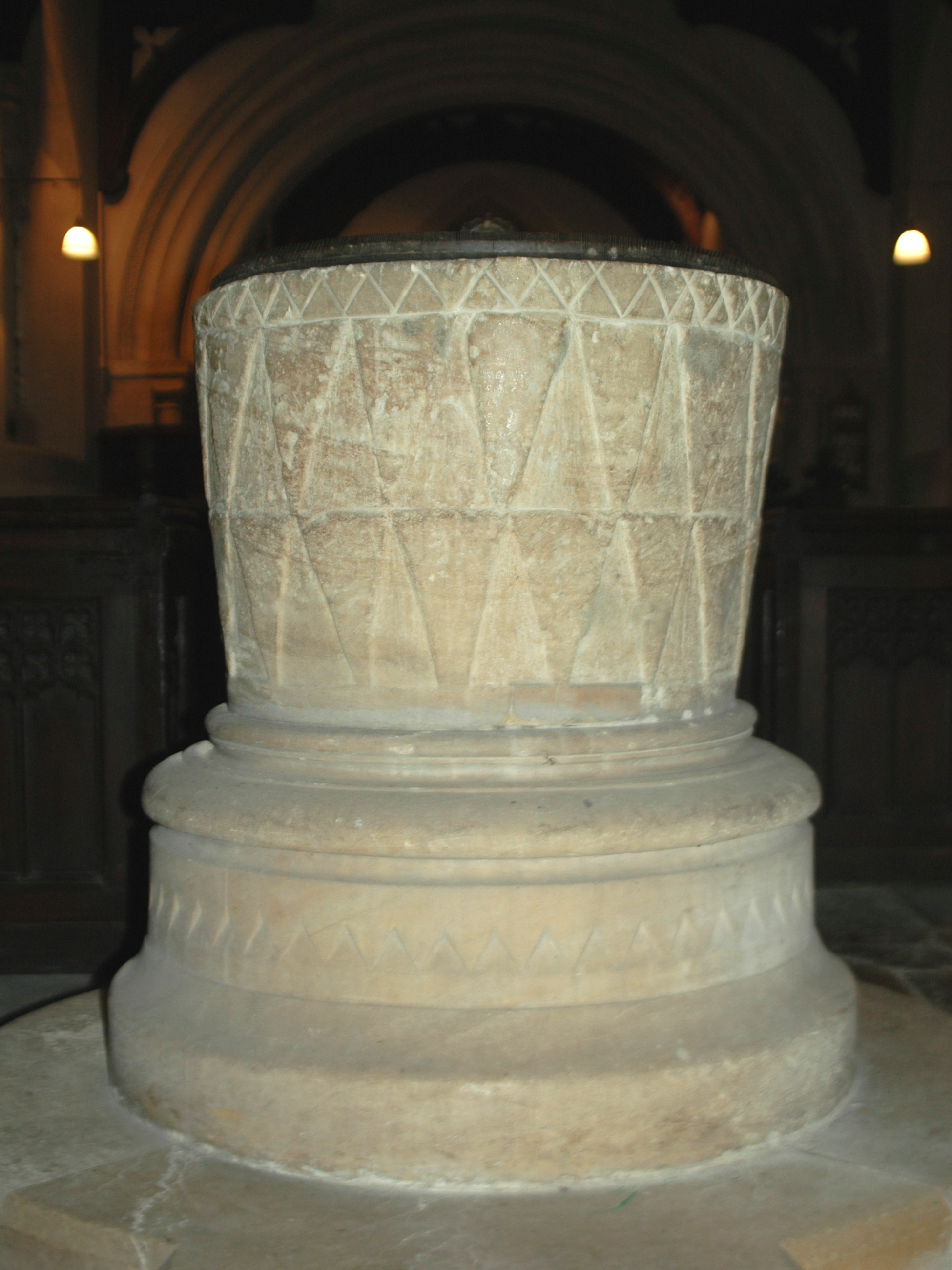
Norman font of St Mary's

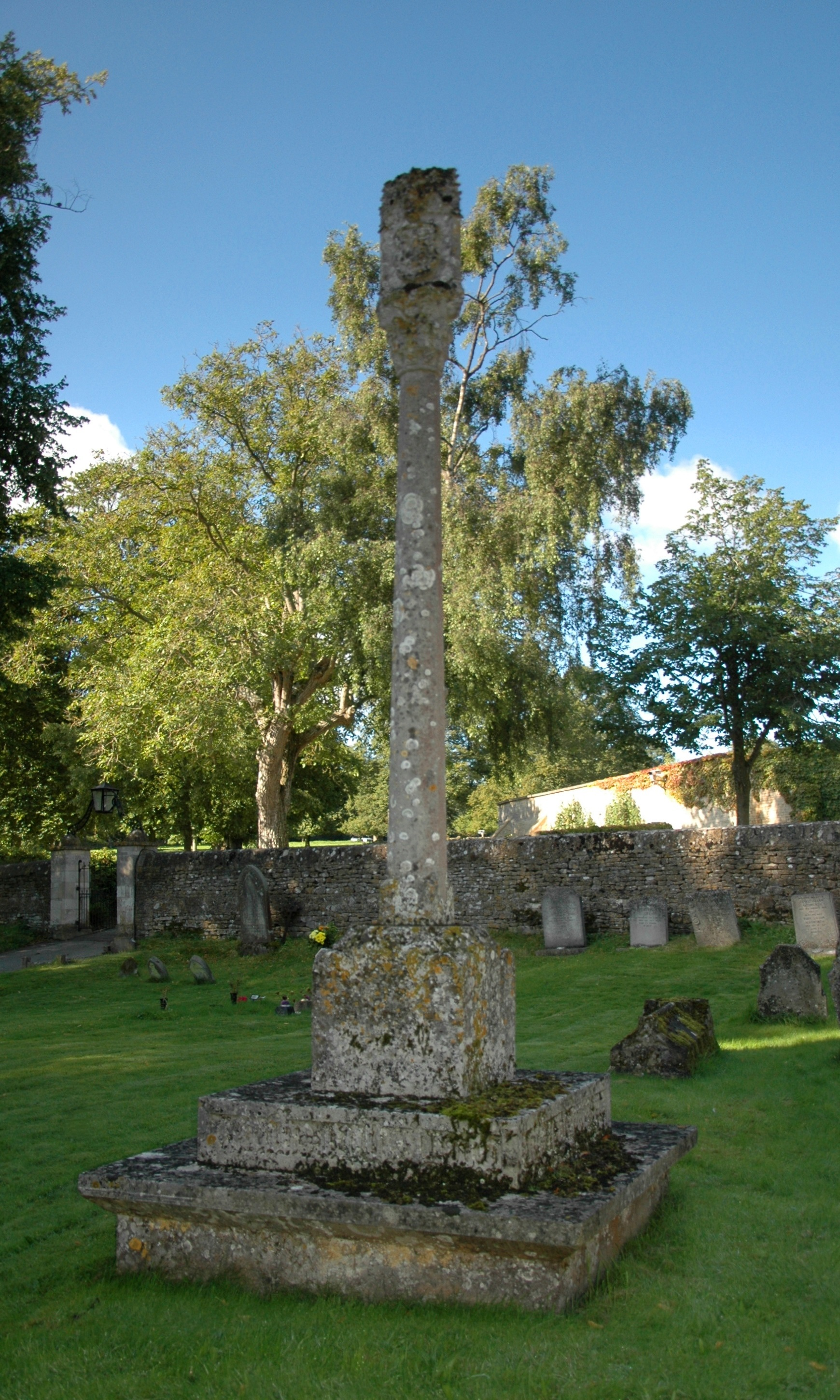
Churchyard cross erected in 1897 to the memory of Henry Barnett (1815–96)

The Church of England parish church of Saint Mary was originally Norman and still has its Norman font. The nave was rebuilt in the later Middle Ages. The bell tower was added in the 16th or 17th century. The chancel was rebuilt and the nave was rebuilt again in the 1730s. In 1872 the Gothic Revival architect G.E. Street had the chancel rebuilt, the Norman chancel arch enlarged, new windows inserted in the nave and a new porch and vestry added. The tower has a chime of five bells, the oldest of which was cast in 1784. The building also has a Sanctus bell that was cast in 1705. St Mary's is now part of a single benefice with Asterleigh, Kiddington and Wootton.

== See also ==
- Clinton

== Sources ==
- Arkell, W.J. (1948). "The building-stones of Blenheim Palace, Cornbury Park, Glympton Park and Heythrop House, Oxfordshire" (PDF). Oxoniensia. XIII. Oxford Architectural and Historical Society: 49–54. ISSN 0308-5562.
- Barnett, Rev. Herbert (1923). Glympton – the History of an Oxfordshire Manor. Oxford University Press.
- Crossley, Alan (ed.); Baggs, A.P.; Colvin, Christina; Colvin, H.M.; Cooper, Janet; Day, C.J.; Selwyn, Nesta; Tomkinson, A. (1983). A History of the County of Oxford. Victoria County History. Vol. 11: Wootton Hundred (northern part). London: Oxford University Press for the Institute of Historical Research. pp. 120–131. ISBN 978-0-19722-758-9.
- Emery, Frank (1974). The Oxfordshire Landscape. The Making of the English Landscape. London: Hodder & Stoughton. p. 172. ISBN 0-340-04301-6.
- Sherwood, Jennifer; Pevsner, Nikolaus (1974). Oxfordshire. The Buildings of England. Harmondsworth: Penguin Books. pp. 612–613. ISBN 0-14-071045-0.
- Thomas, Nicholas (1957). "Excavations at Callow Hill, Glympton and Stonesfield, Oxon" (PDF). Oxoniensia. XXII. Oxford Architectural and Historical Society: 11–53. ISSN 0308-5562.
- Taylor, Christopher (1982) [1975]. Fields in the English Landscape. Archaeology in the Field Series. London: J.M. Dent & Sons Ltd. pp. 75–77. ISBN 0-460-02232-6.
