= Thomas Tesdale =

English businessman (1547–1610)

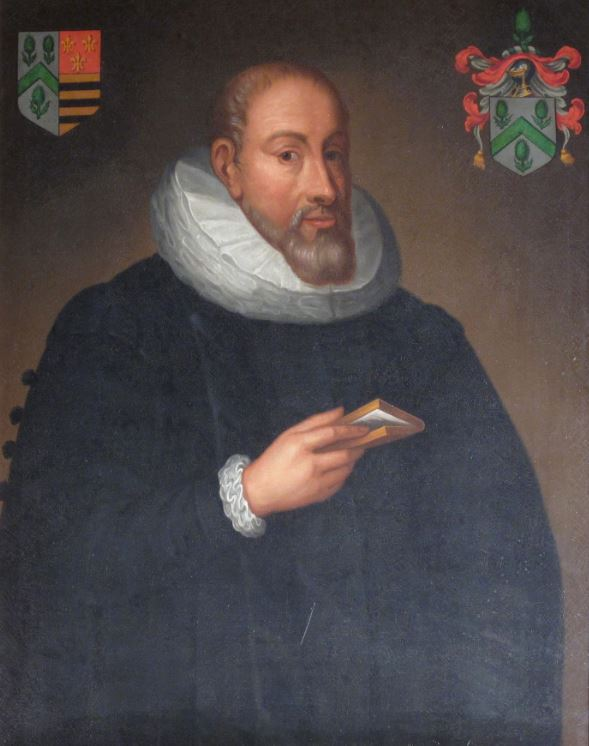
- Photograph of a Thomas Tesdale portrait, in the Amey Theatre at Abingdon School
- Born: 1547; Stanford Dingley, Berkshire
- Died: 13 June 1610; Glympton, Oxfordshire
- Occupation(s): Maltster, woad grower and dyer
- Known for: Benefactor of Abingdon School and Pembroke College, Oxford
- Spouse: Maud Stone

Thomas Tesdale (1547–1610) was an English maltster, benefactor of the town of Abingdon in the English county of Berkshire (now Oxfordshire) and the primary founding benefactor of Pembroke College, Oxford.

== Life and career ==
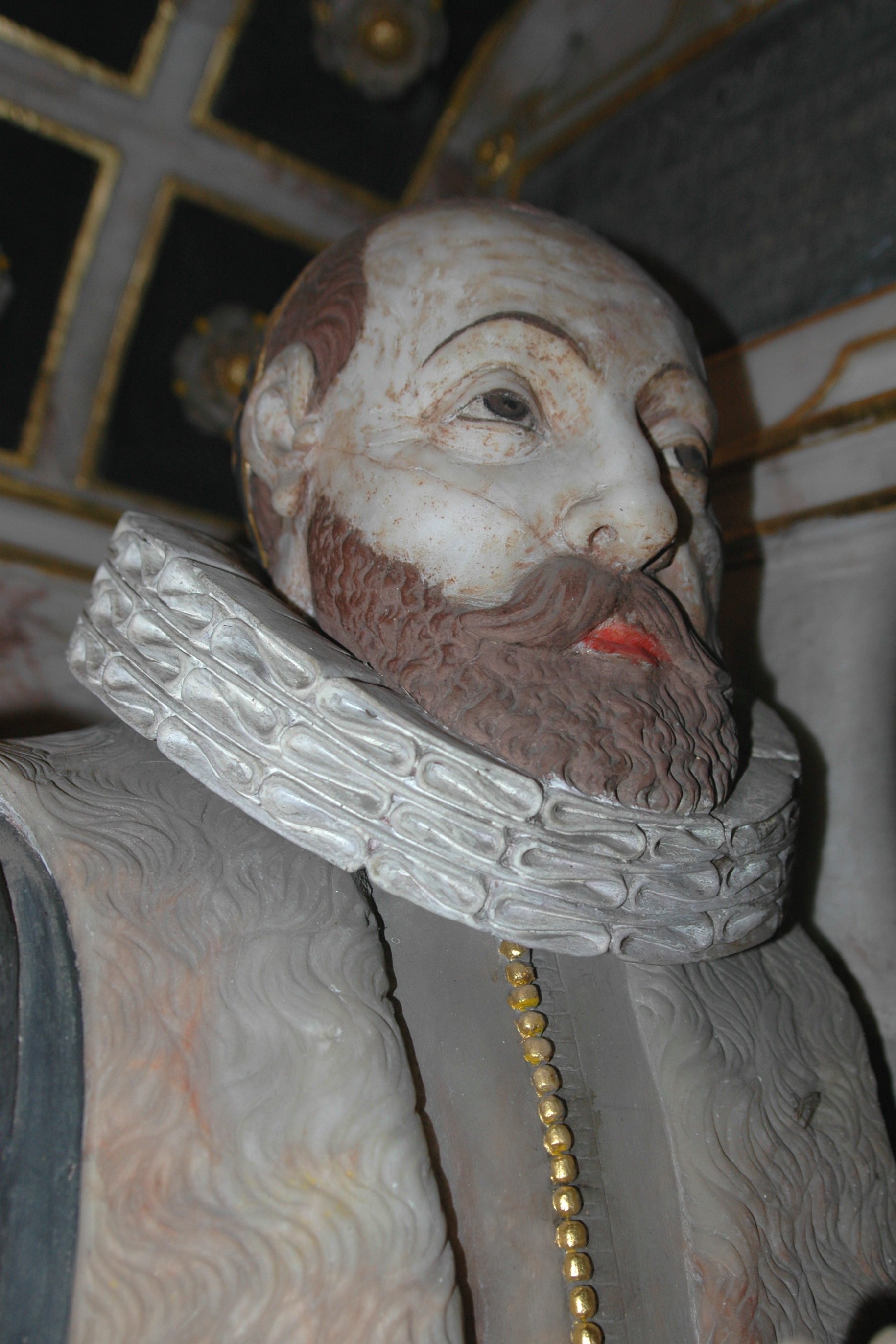
Alabaster likeness of Thomas Tesdale in the Tesdale monument in Glympton parish church

Thomas was born in Stanford Dingley in Berkshire and attended John Roysse's Free School in Abingdon (now Abingdon School). He became a rich maltster in the town, where he served as mayor, and purchased the manor of Ludwell in Oxfordshire.

Tesdale grew wealthy as maltster in Abingdon, and served as Master of Christ's Hospital of Abingdon. In 1581 he was elected mayor, but he did not serve his term as he had left the borough when he bought the manor of Ludwell in Oxfordshire. Soon after 1586 he moved to Glympton near Woodstock, Oxfordshire, where he rented the manor, raised livestock and grew and milled woad for dyeing.

== Death and legacy ==
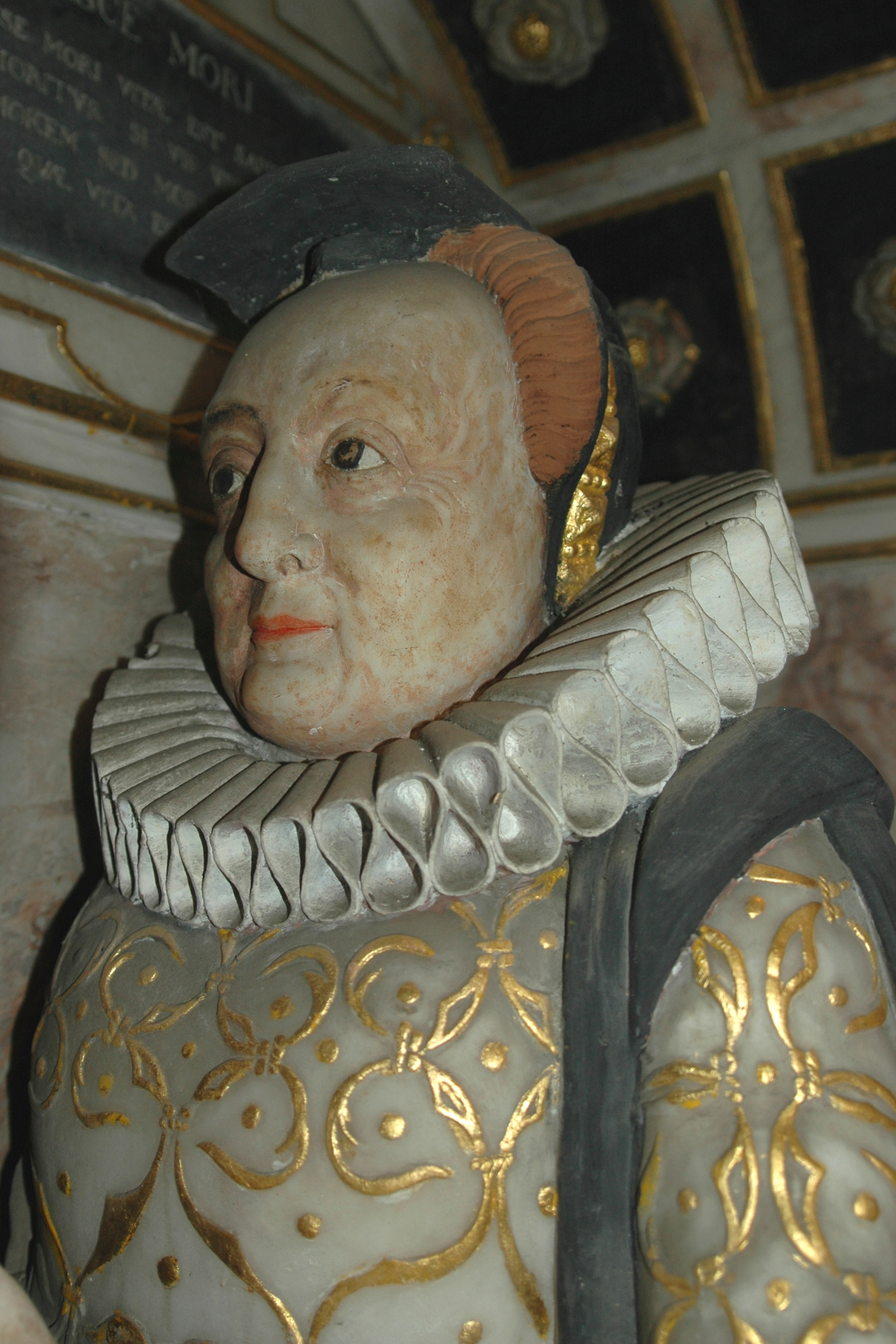
Alabaster likeness of Maud Tesdale in the Tesdale monument in Glympton parish church

He left no children of his marriage to Maud Stone when he died, but gave £5,000 for the education of Abingdon Scholars (seven fellows and six scholars) at Balliol College, Oxford. In 1623, this money was augmented by the Reverend Richard Wightwick of East Ilsley and used instead for the transformation of Broadgates Hall into Pembroke College, named after the Chancellor of Oxford University, William Herbert, 3rd Earl of Pembroke.

He also bequeathed an annual sum of money that allowed Roysses School (now Abingdon School) to employ an Usher (a second master), from 1610 to 1870. They became known as the Tesdale Ushers.

== See also ==
- List of Old Abingdonians

== Printed sources ==
- Crossley, Alan (ed.); Baggs, A.P.; Colvin, Christina; Colvin, H.M.; Cooper, Janet; Day, C.J.; Selwyn, Nesta; Tomkinson, A. (1983). A History of the County of Oxford, Volume 11: Wootton Hundred (northern part). Victoria County History. pp. 120–131.
- Macleane, Rev. Douglas (1897). A History of Pembroke College, Oxford, Recently Broadgates Hall. First Series. Vol. 33. Oxford Historical Society.
- Savage, H. (1668). Balliofergus, or, A commentary upon the foundation, founders, and affaires, of Balliol colledge.
