= Eliza Fay =

English traveller and writer (c.1755–1816)

Eliza Fay (1755 or 1756 – 9 September 1816) was an English letter writer and traveller. She is best known for her vivid accounts of her journeys and experiences in Europe, the Middle East, and India.

== Early life ==
Eliza Fay was born in 1755 or 1756, probably in Rotherhithe, Surrey. She was one of three known daughters of Edward Clement (died 1794), a shipwright from Rotherhithe. Her mother died in or before 1783. Little is known about her family. One of her sisters, Eleanor, married Thomas W. Preston.

Eliza married Anthony Fay, a barrister, on 6 February 1772 in London. The only son of Francis Fay of Rotherhithe, Surrey, and of Irish extraction, Anthony intended to practise as an advocate in the Calcutta Supreme Court. The couple set out for India in April 1779. He was admitted to practice there on 16 June 1780, but subsequently ran into debt and fathered an illegitimate child before returning to England, where he died some time before 1815. The couple separated in August 1781. There were no children from the marriage.

== Passages to India ==
Fay's graphic letters begin in Paris on 18 April 1779; her account suggests that she had visited France several times before. This is followed by an eventful journey across the Alps, then by sea to Egypt, and across the deserts of Egypt in a caravan that was attacked by bandits, culminating in imprisonment upon arrival in Calicut by Hyder Ali, ruler of the Kingdom of Mysore. Eventually escaping with the help of a Jewish merchant from Cochin, Mr Isaac, she and her husband arrived in Calcutta in May 1780.

The letters reveal considerable narrative power and include what E. M. Forster, her editor, described as "little character sketches... delightfully malicious." Fay appears to have had religious convictions and a distaste for indelicacy, along with a command of French and an ability to learn other languages, such as Italian, Portuguese, and Hindustani, with high speed, although she had little formal education. Eliza entered Calcutta society during her first stay there, meeting prominent figures including Warren Hastings. However, this goodwill may have been eroded by the wild behaviour of her husband, or possibly by her own ill temper.

Fay obtained a legal separation from her husband in August 1781, and returned to England via Madras and Saint Helena in 1782, but set out again for India in 1784. This time, her social status was lower; she supported herself with a millinery shop and by mantua making. Although she was declared bankrupt in 1788, she continued to trade and paid off her creditors by 1793.

Her observations and interpretations of Indian society continued. Of suttee (the immolation of widows), she opined that it was not a proof of feeling, but "entirely a political scheme intended to insure the care and good offices of wives to their husbands."

Her business partner, Avis Hicks, and Anthony Fay’s son, whom Hicks was accompanying to England, drowned at sea in September 1786. Returning to England in 1794, Eliza inherited property in Glamorgan following the death of her father, and became a merchant. However, she was dogged by misfortunes, and bankruptcy ensued again in 1800. Her third visit to Calcutta, in 1796, lasted only six months. She acquired another ship, loaded it with muslins, and set off for the United States, but the vessel sank at the mouth of the Hooghly. Nevertheless, she managed by other means to reach New York City, arriving on 3 September 1797.

Sailing again for Calcutta in August 1804, she returned the following year with 14 children to open a school at Ashburnham House, Blackheath. She continued to run the school with a partner, Maria Cousins, until 1814. She stayed in Blackheath with Mrs Preston in 1815, before embarking on a final voyage to Calcutta, where she began preparing her letters and papers for publication. She died at the age of 60 on 9 September 1816 in Calcutta.

== Editions of the letters ==
Fay died insolvent, and her invaluable letters were handled by the administrator of her estate as one of her few remaining assets. Her account of her first two voyages appeared in 1817 and, according to official records, generated a profit of 220 rupees for her creditors over four years. However, the administrator "lost enthusiasm," according to E. M. Forster, so that the published versions cover events only up to 1797. The volume was reprinted in 1821.

Later glimpses of her life, including surviving manuscript pages and materials from English court and other archives, come from notes compiled by her 1908 editor, Walter Kelly Firminger (1870–1940), author of the long-running Thacker's Guide to Calcutta. This edition was later superseded by a scholarly edition edited by E. M. Forster, published by the Hogarth Press in 1925. In 2010, Forster's edition was reprinted by New York Review Books, with a new introduction by Simon Winchester.

== See also ==
- Women letter writers

== Bibliography ==
- E. M. Forster: Introductory Notes. In: Original Letters from India (New York: NYRB, 2010 [1925]). ISBN 978-1-59017-336-7
- Joan Mickelson-Gaughan, The "incumberances" [sic]: British Women in India, 1615–1856, 1st ed., New Delhi: Oxford University Press, 2013

=== Primary Sources ===
- Eliza Fay, Original Letters from India, 1779–1815 (London, 1925)

== Additional reading ==
- Linda Colley, "Going Native, Telling Tales: Captivity, Collaborations and Empire", Past & Present, No. 168 (2000), pp. 170–193. Accessed 8 February 2021. http://www.jstor.org/stable/651308
- Matthew Lockwood, "The birth of British India". To Begin the World Over Again: How the American Revolution Devastated the Globe, pp. 274–313. New Haven/London: Yale University Press, 2019. Accessed 8 February 2021. doi:10.2307/j.ctvnwc044.15.
- Mohamad Ali Hachicho, "English Travel Books about the Arab near East in the Eighteenth Century". Die Welt des Islams, New Series 9, no. 1/4 (1964), pp. 1–206. Accessed 8 February 2021.
