= Norman Cranstoun Macleod =

Sir Norman Cranstoun Macleod

9th Chief justice of Bombay High Court
- In office 1 June 1919 – 6 June 1926
- Appointed by: George V
- Preceded by: Basil Scott
- Succeeded by: Amberson Barrington Marten

Judge of Bombay High Court
- In office 1910 – 31 May 1919
- Appointed by: George V

Personal details
- Born: 1866
- Died: 1945 (aged 78–79)

Sir Norman Cranstoun Macleod (1866–1945) was the 9th Chief Justice of the Bombay High Court in British India.

== Career ==
Norman Cranstoun Macleod, known by his middle name, was the son of Robert Macleod, V of Cadboll. In 1890, he came to British India as a barrister and started practice in Bombay. During this time, until 1898, he lived in a small house in Nana Chowk and had a small office first on Mint Road, then on Gunbow Street.

In 1900, Jamshedji Kanga joined him as his first junior. In 1898, after he started having a roaring practice, he bought a house in Kemp's Corner and a large Chambers (where Yusuf Building, Flora Fountain currently stands), taking on several Indian juniors, including future judges as Govind Magdavkar and Harilal Kania.

However, in 1904 he joined the Higher Judicial Services of Bombay. He held various charges in judicial and administrative offices. Cranstoun Macleod worked as Chief Judge of the Small Causes Court, Taxing Master and Commissioner for taking accounts. Elevated to the Bench as a Puisne Judge in 1910, after Sir Basil Scott he was appointed the Chief Justice of the Bombay High Court on 1 June 1919 and served until 1926.

On 17 January 1923, he passed the order of removal of Mahatma Gandhi's name from the Roll of Barristers due to his imprisonment.
