= Advocate-General of Bombay =

The Advocate-General of Bombay was charged with advising the Government of the British administered Bombay Presidency on legal matters. The Presidency existed from 1668 to 1947. Prior to 1858, when it was administered by the East India Company, the Advocate-General was the senior law officer of that company and also the Attorney-General of the Sovereign of Great Britain. He was an ex-officio member of the Legislative Council.

== List of Advocates-General of Bombay ==
East India Company

- Hugh George Macklin 1810-1820
- Ollyett Woodhouse 1820–1822
- George Norton 1827–1828 (afterwards Advocate-General of Madras, 1828)
- Richard Orlando Bridgeman 1828 (died in office of cholera)
- James Dewar (acting) 1828–
- Augustus Smith LeMesurier 1833–1856
- Sir Michael Roberts Westropp 1856–1857

British Raj

- Arthur James Lewis 1857–1865 (died in office)
- Sir Michael Roberts Westropp 1861–1862
- Lyttleton Holyoake Bayley 17 Mar 1866–1869
- James Sewell White 1869–
- Sir Andrew Richard Scoble 1872–1877
- John Marriott 1877–1884
- Francis Law Latham 1884–1893
- Basil Lang 1893–1902
- Basil Scott 4 Feb 1902–
- (Sir) Pherozeshah Mehta 1908–
- Thomas Joseph Strangman 1908–1915
- Malcolm Robert Jardine 1915–1916
- Thomas Joseph Strangman 1916–1922
- Sir Jamshedjee Kanga 1922–1935
  - Bhulabhai Desai Mar 1926 (acting)
- Sir Kenneth McIntyre Kemp 1935–
- Noshirwanji Engineer 1942–1945 (afterwards Advocate-General of India, 1945)

== See also ==
- History of Bombay under British rule
