= William Clayton, 1st Baron Sundon =

Member of the Parliament of Great Britain

The Right Honourable The Baron Sundon MP
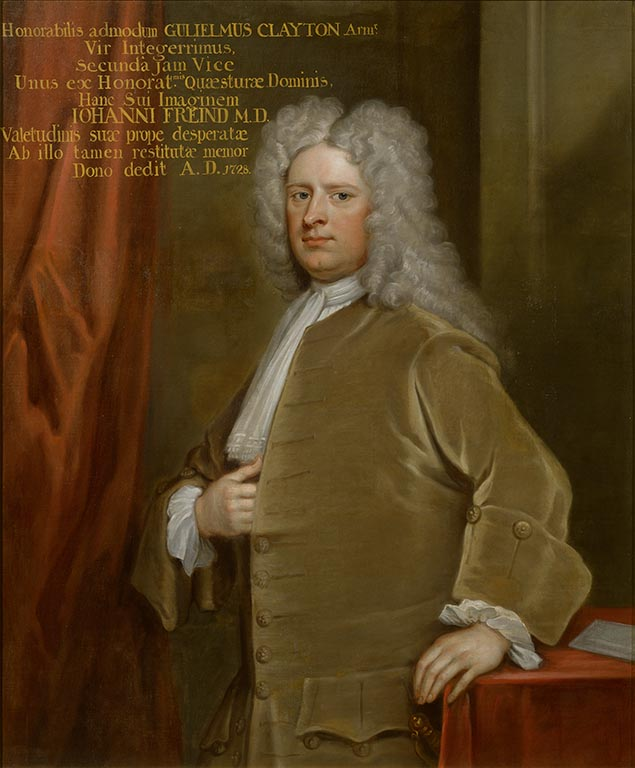
- Lord Sundon by Godfrey Kneller

Lord of the Treasury
- In office 1718–1720

Member of the House of Commons
- In office 1716–1752

Personal details
- Born: 1671
- Died: 29 April 1752 (aged 80–81)
- Spouse: Charlotte Dyve
- Occupation: politician

William Clayton, 1st Baron Sundon (1671 – 29 April 1752), of Sundon Hall, Sundon, Bedfordshire, was a British Treasury official and politician who sat in the House of Commons from 1716 to 1752.

== Early life ==
Clayton was baptized on 9 November 1671, the eldest surviving son of William Clayton of Newmarket, Suffolk, and Ann Haske, the daughter of John Haske of Newmarket. He married Charlotte, the daughter of John Dyve, clerk of the Privy Council, before 1714. He was the youngest son of Sir Lewis Dyve.

== Career ==
Clayton entered the Exchequer as clerk of receipts in 1688 and was deputy auditor of receipts by 1714. He was managing the Duke of Marlborough's estates during the Duke's exile and at the accession of George I, his wife was appointed woman of the bedchamber to the Princess of Wales on the recommendation of the Duchess of Marlborough. In 1715 the Prince and Princess, tried unsuccessfully to get Clayton made secretary to the Treasury under Walpole, but helped him to obtain a place as paymaster of the King's private pensions instead. Clayton purchased the estates of Sundon in 1716 and was returned unopposed as Member of Parliament for Woodstock by Marlborough at a by-election on 2 July 1716. The Duke's son-in-law, Lord Sunderland, made him a Lord of the Treasury in 1718. but he was turned out of the post to make room for Walpole's friends on the reunion of the Whig party in 1720. Clayton was elected to the South Sea committee of the House of Commons, and spoke against Walpole's proposals for restoring public credit and discharging a civil list debt in January and July 1721.

At the 1722 British general election was defeated at Woodstock but was returned in a contest for St Albans as the Duchess's nominee. Marlborough was dying at this time, and Clayton was one of his executors. In Parliament, Clayton spoke against the Government on a bill for taxing Roman Catholics in 1723, and on the dropping of bounties on wheat exports from Scotland in December 1724. Clayton was appointed auditor general to the Prince of Wales in 1725. In April 1727, he and Pulteney attacked Walpole's proposals for financing a budget deficit.

On the accession of George II, with Clayton's connection to the Queen, through his wife, he was reappointed Lord of the Treasury. However he had fallen out with the Duchess of Marlborough through taking office under Walpole, and at the 1727 British general election, he was returned unopposed as MP for Westminster. He spoke for the Government in the 1727 Parliament. He was returned unopposed again for Westminster at the 1734 British general election but thereafter was primarily concerned with his constituency. He was raised to the Peerage of Ireland on 2 June 1735 as Baron Sundon, of Ardagh in the County of Longford. At the 1741 British general election he was returned after a fierce contest, but the partiality of the high bailiff, who prematurely closed the poll, caused a riot and Sundon had to be rescued by the guards. The election was declared void by the House of Commons, which was a serious blow to Walpole's Administration. Clayton's wife, who had suffered bouts of madness since the death of the Queen, died at this time. After the fall of Walpole, Clayton lost his post at the Treasury, but was given a government seat at Plympton Erle where he was returned at a by-election on 3 May 1742. At the 1747 British general election, he was returned for St Mawes, another government seat.

== Death and legacy ==
Clayton died on 29 April 1752. He had no children and the peerage became extinct upon his death. Sundon Hall was inherited by 4 nieces, who sold the property.

Parliament of Great Britain
Preceded by William Cadogan; Sir Thomas Wheate, Bt	Member of Parliament for Woodstock; 1716–1722; With: Sir Thomas Wheate, Bt, to 1721; Charles Crisp 1721–22	Succeeded by Sir Thomas Wheate, Bt; Samuel Trotman
Preceded by William Grimston; Joshua Lomax	Member of Parliament for St Albans; 1722–1727; With: William Gore	Succeeded by The Viscount Grimston; Caleb Lomax
Preceded by George Carpenter; Charles Montagu	Member of Parliament for Westminster; 1727–1741; With: Lord Charles Cavendish 1727–1734; Sir Charles Wager 1734–1741	Succeeded by Viscount Perceval; Charles Edwin
Preceded by Richard Edgcumbe; Thomas Clutterbuck	Member of Parliament for Plympton Erle; May 1742 – July 1747; With: Thomas Clutterbuck to December 1742; Richard Edgcumbe (2) from December 1742	Succeeded by Hon. George Edgcumbe; Richard Edgcumbe (2)
Preceded by Robert Nugent; James Douglas	Member of Parliament for St Mawes; 1747–1753; With: Robert Nugent	Succeeded by Robert Nugent; Sir Thomas Clavering, Bt
Peerage of Ireland
New creation	Baron Sundon; 1735–1752	Extinct
