= Gerard Fleetwood =

Sir Gerard Fleetwood was an English landowner and politician who sat in the House of Commons from 1625 to 1626.

Fleetwood was the son of Thomas Fleetwood. He was knighted in July 1603 and was Ranger of Woodstock Park in 1611. In 1625, he was elected Member of Parliament for Woodstock. He was re-elected MP for Woodstock in 1626.

Fleetwood lived in Hampshire which was under Royalist control in the English Civil War. He was a Commissioner of Array and went to Winchester as he later claimed not through choice. His estates were sequestered by Parliament and on 22 February 1646, he requested "a moderate composition" because he "disliked the business, and was never in arms". He was willing to submit to a fine and on 7 April, a fine was set a £500. In addition to this, he was assessed by the Committee of Advance of Money at £400 on 29 January 1647. However his debts were judged to amount to £4476 on 16 November 1648 and his assessment was taken off on 24 November "as his debts are much more than the whole value of his estate."

Fleetwood was living in 1651.

Parliament of England
Preceded by Sir Philip Cary; William Lenthall	Member of Parliament for Woodstock; 1625–1626; With: Sir Philip Cary 1625; Edward Tavernor 1626	Succeeded by Edward Tavernor; William Fleetwood
