= Francis William Maclean =

English barrister and politician (1844-1913)

Sir Francis William Maclean KCIE, KC
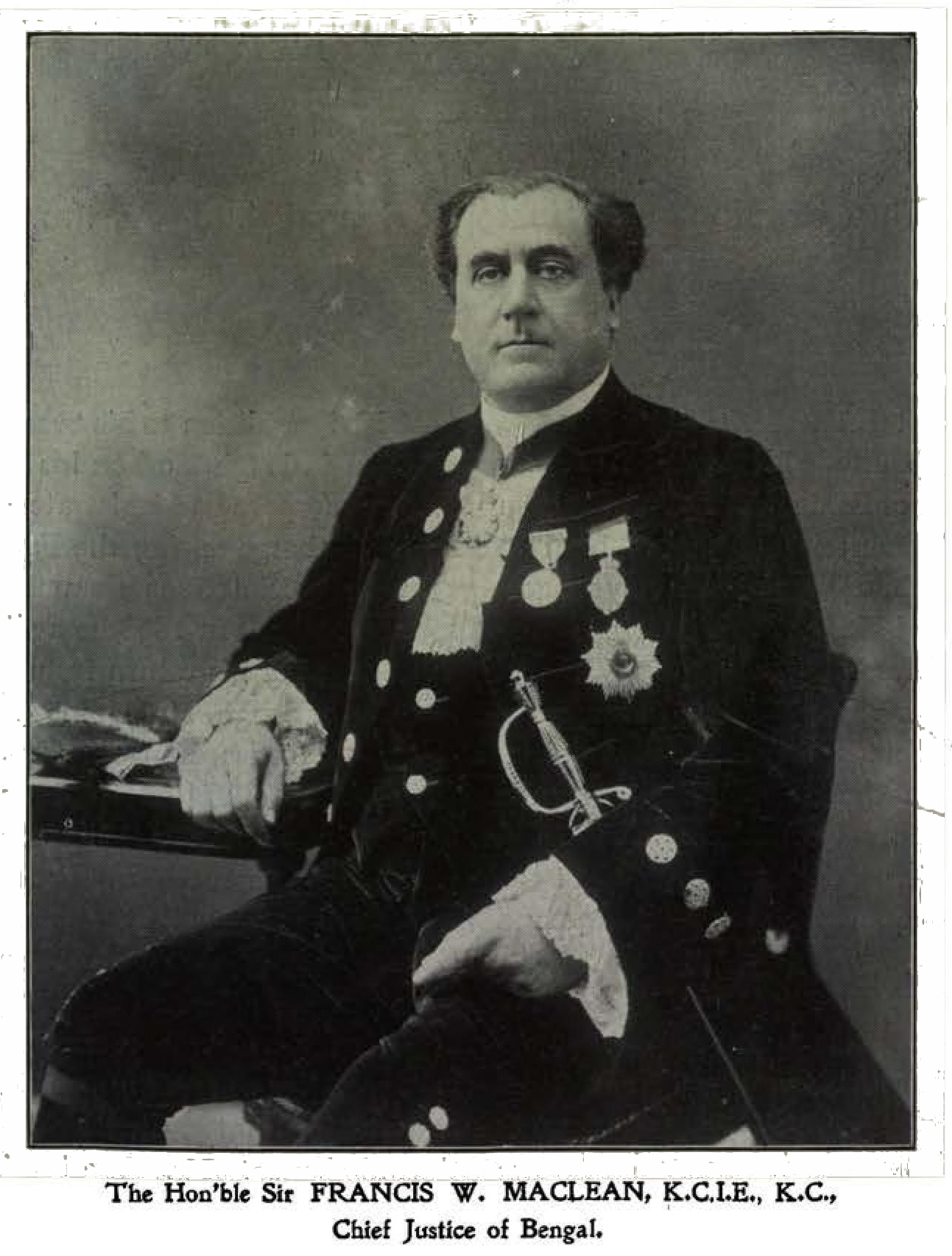

5th Chief Justice of Calcutta High Court
- In office 1896 – March 1909
- Appointed by: Queen Victoria
- Preceded by: William Comer Petheram
- Succeeded by: Lawrence Hugh Jenkins

Member of House of Commons
- In office 1885–1891
- Monarch: Queen Victoria
- Preceded by: Lord Randolph Churchill
- Succeeded by: George Herbert Morrell
- Constituency: Woodstock

Personal details
- Born: 13 December 1844
- Died: 11 November 1913 (aged 68) London
- Spouse: Mattie Sowerby
- Relations: John MacLean (grandson)
- Children: Montague MacLean
- Education: Westminster School, Trinity College, Dublin

Sir Francis William Maclean KCIE KC (13 December 1844 – 11 November 1913) was an English barrister and Liberal Party politician who sat in the House of Commons from 1885 to 1891.

Maclean was the third son of Alexander Maclean, of Barrow Hedges, Carshalton, Surrey. He was educated at Westminster School and at Trinity College, Cambridge. He was called to the bar at Inner Temple in 1868.

In 1885 Maclean was elected Member of Parliament for Woodstock. He became a Liberal Unionist member following the ructions of 1886. He held the seat until his resignation in 1891.

Maclean was made a Q.C. in 1886. After resigning his seat he was Master in Lunacy until 1896, becoming a bencher in 1892. From 1896 to 1909 he was Chief Justice of Bengal. He was knighted in 1896, appointed Knight Commander of the Indian Empire (KCIE) in 1898, and awarded the Kaisar-i-Hind Medal in 1900. His career in India included the chairmanship of famine relief committees in 1897, 1900 and 1907, as well as a short spell as Vice-Chancellor of the University of Calcutta between 1898 and 1900.

Maclean resided latterly in London and died at the age of 68.

Maclean married Mattie Sowerby of Benwell Tower, Northumberland in August 1869. Their son, Montague Francis Maclean, was a leading figure in the coal industry.

Parliament of the United Kingdom
Preceded by Lord Randolph Churchill	Member of Parliament for Woodstock; 1885–1891	Succeeded by George Herbert Morrell
Legal offices
Preceded by Sir William Comer Petheram	Chief Justice of Bengal; 1896–1909	Succeeded by Sir Lawrence Hugh Jenkins
