= Charlotte Clayton, Baroness Sundon =

English courtier

The Right Honourable The Baroness Sundon
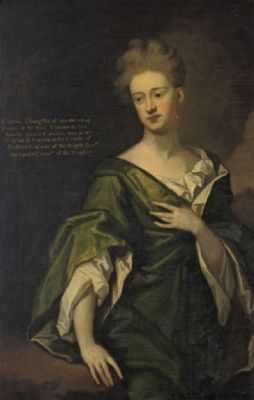
- Portrait by Godfrey Kneller, c. 1730s
- Born: Charlotte Dyve; 11 December c.1677
- Died: 1 January 1742; Cleveland Row, London
- Occupation: Courtier
- Spouse: William Clayton, 1st Baron Sundon

Charlotte Clayton, Baroness Sundon (née Dyve; 11 December c. 1677 – 1 January 1742) was a British Lady in Waiting. She is known as the influential favourite of queen regent Caroline. She concerned Robert Walpole who suspected that she was selling her influence.

== Life ==
Charlotte was the daughter of John Dyve, clerk of the Privy Council and Frances Wolseley, and granddaughter of Sir Lewis Dyve of Bromham in Bedfordshire. Her exact date of birth is unknown, although her birthday was given as 11 December in poems dedicated to Charlotte by the poet Mary Jones. There is a baptismal record for a "Charlot Dyves", daughter of John and Francis [sic], in Westminster, London which gives a baptism date of 10 August 1678. If Jones was correct about Charlotte's birthday, it is likely therefore that Charlotte was born on 11 December 1677. This would make her just under eight months old at the time of baptism.

She married William Clayton, a Treasury official, sometime before 1714. There is a banns record in Hatfield, Hertfordshire that shows a Charlotte Dyve marrying William Clayton on 30 December 1697, which is likely to have been them as Charlotte would have been eighteen at the time of the marriage. Her husband was an MP who was also employed to look after the interests of the Lord of Marlborough. In 1735 she became Lady Sundon when her husband was made first Baron Sundon of Ardagh. They had no children.

The Duchess of Marlborough is thought to have interceded so that Charlotte Clayton became a woman of the bedchamber to Queen Caroline from 1714 until 1737. She became very close to the Queen, who served as regent during the king's absence. She was mistrusted by Robert Walpole who accused her of taking a bribe of a pair of earrings to help the husband of Henrietta Fermor, Countess of Pomfret. He suspected that it was her opinions that were making the Queen uncooperative in state affairs. It was alleged that she even proposed that she and Walpole could rule the country. The Queen's death was a great blow to her, and in her last years, she was afflicted with a painful tumour as well as (according to gossip) bouts of insanity.

She died on the first day of 1742 at her home in Cleveland Row, St James's. She was buried at Sundon Hall on 20 January.
