= Edward Tavernor =

Edward Tavernor was an English politician who sat in the House of Commons between 1626 and 1629.

Tavernor may have been the son of John Tavernor, surveyor of the King's Woods in 1605. In 1626, he was elected Member of Parliament for Woodstock. He was re-elected MP for Woodstock in 1628 and sat until 1629 when King Charles dispensed with parliament for eleven years. His name appears in the Calendar of State Papers receiving reimbursement for royal expenses at this time. He was Secretary to the Lord Chamberlain, Philip Herbert, Earl of Pembroke and Montgomery, in December 1630, and was still held the post in 1637.

Parliament of England
Preceded by Sir Philip Cary; Sir Gerard Fleetwood	Member of Parliament for Woodstock; 1626–1629; With: Sir Gerard Fleetwood 1626; William Fleetwood 1628–1629	Parliament suspended until 1640
