= George Herbert Morrell =

British politician

Morrell in 1895.

George Herbert Morrell (1845, Adderbury – 30 September 1906, Bad Nauheim) was an English politician and lawyer.

George Herbert Morrell was the son of the Rev. G. K. Morrell, fellow of St John's College, Oxford. He was educated at Rugby School and Exeter College, Oxford, where he took honours in natural science as well as a B.C.L. in 1870. Morrell became a demonstrator in physiology at the Oxford university museum under George Rolleston. In 1874 he married his third cousin, Emilia Alicia Morrell (1854–1938), granddaughter of one of the founder of Morrells Brewery and the richest heiress in Oxfordshire. He was the Conservative Member of Parliament for Woodstock, from 1891 to 1892 and again from 1895 till 1906.

Parliament of the United Kingdom
Preceded by Francis William Maclean	Member of Parliament for Woodstock; 1891 – 1892	Succeeded by Godfrey Benson
Preceded by Godfrey Benson	Member of Parliament for Woodstock; 1895 – 1906	Succeeded by Ernest Bennett
