= Sir Charles Crisp, 5th Baronet =

English politician; (1680–1740)

Sir Charles Crisp, 5th Baronet, or Crispe (c. 1680–1740), of Dornford, Oxfordshire was an English landowner and politician, who sat in the House of Commons from 1721 to 1722.

== Early life ==
Crisp was the second son of Sir Nicholas Crisp, 2nd Baronet, of Hammersmith and Squerryes, Westerham, Kent, and his wife Judith Adrian. daughter of John Adrian, merchant.of London. He married, on 21 April 1714, Anne Crispe, daughter of Thomas Crispe of Dornford, Oxfordshire, a first cousin once removed on his father's side. His father in law died in 1714 and his wife in 1718, so he gained possession of the estate at Dornford. In 1715 he became High Sheriff of Oxfordshire.

== Career ==
Crisp was elected Member of Parliament for New Woodstock at a by-election on, 27 October 1721, with the backing of the Duchess of Marlborough. However he lost the seat, at the 1722 general election, to Sir Thomas Wheate, 2nd Baronet whom he had defeated a year earlier.

Crisp became a baronet on 1 June 1730, when his nephew Sir Nicholas Crispe, 4th Baronet died.

== Death and legacy ==
Crisp died without issue on 9 July 1740 and the baronetcy became extinct. His estate, including Dornford, passed to female relations, among them Mary Crispe, daughter of Sir John Crispe, 3rd Baronet. She had married George Stonehouse, in 1739.

== Notes ==
Parliament of Great Britain
Preceded by William Clayton; Sir Thomas Wheate, 1st Bt	Member of Parliament for New Woodstock; 1721–1722; With: William Clayton	Succeeded by Samuel Trotman; Sir Thomas Wheate, 2nd Bt
Baronetage of England
Preceded by Nicholas Crispe	Baronet (of Hammersmith); 1730-1740	Extinct
