= Pratul Chandra Gupta =

Indian historian (1910–1990)

- Born: 16 January 1910; Teota, Manikganj District, Bangladesh
- Died: 11 March 1990 (aged 80); Kolkata, India
- Occupations: Historian; Writer; Academic; Vice-Chancellor
- Known for: Maratha history
- Awards: Padma Bhushan

Pratul Chandra Gupta (16 January 1910 – 11 March 1990) was an Indian historian, writer and the author of Nana Sahib and the Rising at Cawnpore, a historical account of the siege of Cawnpore. Considered by many as an authority on Maratha history, he translated The Maharashta Purana, an 18th-century Bengali text written by Gangaram into English, Edward C. Dimock, a known Indologist, being his co-translator. One of his books, INA in Military Operation, was commissioned by Jawaharlal Nehru but the book could not be published, reportedly due to political objections. The Last Peshwa and the English Commissioners, 1818–1851 and Shah Alam II and His Court are some of his other notable works. The Government of India awarded him the third highest civilian honour of the Padma Bhushan, in 1975, for his contributions to Literature.

== Career ==
Pratul Chandra Gupta was born in the Teota Rajbari (the home of his mother's family) in 1910. He started school in Rangpur and then attended Calcutta's South Suburban School. He attained an BA Hons. and MA in history from Presidency College Calcutta, and, after further study of law, he returned to history. He was one of the first Indians to receive a PhD from a UK university (School of Oriental Studies, University of London, 1936).

On his return to India, he became lecturer (1939–1956), and then reader (1957–1961) at the University of Calcutta, and then Professor and Head of the Department of History at Jadavpur University (1961–1970). He was Vice-Chancellor at Visva-Bharati University, Santiniketan (1971–1975) and Vice Chancellor at Rabindra Bharati University, Calcutta (1975–1979).

Pratul Chandra Gupta was active in several learned societies, and especially in The Asiatic Society (Calcutta) where he was President 1981–1983. He was a member of the Trustees of the Victoria Memorial, Calcutta 1972–1980. As well as writing scholarly works in English, he published extensively in Bengali, writing stories for children and adults. His autobiography, Dinguli Mor, was published by Ananda Publishers, Calcutta, in 1985.

He died in Calcutta in 1990.

== Family ==
Pratul Chandra Gupta was the eldest son of Atul Chandra Gupta and Savitri Ray. He married Supriya Roy, and had two children, Avijit (1942–2023) and Ishani (born 1949). Supriya died in 1956.

== See also ==
- Siege of Cawnpore
