= Richard Wightwick =

Richard Wightwick

Richard Wightwick (c. 1547–1629) was a Church of England clergyman, co-founder of Pembroke College, Oxford. His name is also spelt Wyghtwicke.

Wightwick was educated at Balliol College, Oxford, where he graduated BA on 2 July 1580, MA on 4 July 1583, and Bachelor of Divinity on 31 May 1593.

In 1595, Wightwick was appointed as rector of Albury, Oxfordshire, and in 1607 as rector of East Ilsley, Berkshire.

In 1610, Thomas Tesdale on his death gave £5,000 for six scholarships and seven fellowships at Balliol College for the benefit of men from Abingdon School. In 1623, Wightwick added to this fund, and their money was used for the conversion of Broadgates Hall into Pembroke College.

Broadgates Hall had been an academic hall for law students. King James I signed letters patent to create the college in 1624, and it was named for William Herbert, 3rd Earl of Pembroke, Chancellor of the university.

Wightwick died in 1629.

Men related to Wightwick, such as William Adams (1706–1789) were thereafter given preferential admission to Pembroke College, as founder's kin.
