= Woodstock (UK Parliament constituency) =

UK parliamentary constituency in England 1553–1918

Oxfordshire, Mid or Woodstock Division
- Former county constituency for the House of Commons

1885–1918
- Seats: one

Woodstock
- Former borough constituency for the House of Commons

1553–1885
- Seats: two to 1832, then one
- Replaced by: Banbury and Henley

Woodstock, sometimes called New Woodstock, was a parliamentary constituency in the United Kingdom named after the town of Woodstock in the county of Oxfordshire.

== History ==
The Parliamentary Borough comprised the town of Woodstock and (from 1832) the surrounding countryside and villages. It elected two Members of Parliament to the House of Commons of the Parliament of England from its re-enfranchisement in 1553 until 1707, then of the Parliament of Great Britain from 1707 to 1800 and of the Parliament of the United Kingdom from 1801. Under the Great Reform Act 1832, the representation of the borough was reduced to one member.

Under the Redistribution of Seats Act 1885, the borough was abolished and was reconstituted as the Mid or Woodstock Division of Oxfordshire when the three-member Parliamentary County of Oxfordshire was divided into the three single-member constituencies of Banbury, Woodstock and Henley. It comprised the middle part of Oxfordshire, including Witney and Bicester as well as the abolished borough.

The constituency was abolished under the Representation of the People Act 1918. The western half, including Witney and Woodstock, was added to the Banbury Division and the eastern half, including Bicester, to the Henley Division.

== Boundaries ==
=== 1885–1918 ===
- The Municipal Borough of Woodstock;
- The Sessional Divisions of Bampton East, Bampton West, Ploughley, and Wooton South; and
- Part of the Sessional Division of Bullingdon.

Only non-resident freeholders of the Parliamentary Borough of Oxford (which included the Municipal Borough thereof) were entitled to vote.

== Members of Parliament ==
=== 1553–1640 ===
Parliament	First member	Second member
1553 (Oct)	William Cooke	Sir Ralph Chamberlain
1554 (Apr)	Sir Ralph Chamberlain	William Johnson
1554 (Nov)	Anthony Restwold	George Chamberlain
1571	Thomas Peniston	Martin Johnson
1572	George Whiton	Martin Johnson
1584	Lawrence Tanfield	Henry Unton
1586	Lawrence Tanfield	Francis Stonor
1588	Lawrence Tanfield	John Lee
1593	Lawrence Tanfield	John Lee
1597	Lawrence Tanfield	John Lee
1601	Lawrence Tanfield	William Scott
1604	Sir Richard Lee	Thomas Spencer
1609	Sir James Whitelocke	Thomas Spencer
1614	Sir James Whitelocke	Sir Philip Cary
1621	Sir James Whitelocke	Sir Philip Cary
1624	Sir Philip Cary	William Lenthall
1625	Sir Philip Cary	Sir Gerard Fleetwood
1626	Edward Tavernor	Sir Gerard Fleetwood
1628	Edward Tavernor	Sir Miles Fleetwood
1629–1640	No Parliaments summoned	

=== 1640–1832 ===
Year	First member	First party	Second member	Second party
April 1640	William Lenthall	Parliamentarian	William Fleetwood	
November 1640	William Lenthall	Parliamentarian	Hon. William Herbert	Royalist
December 1640	William Lenthall	Parliamentarian	Sir Robert Pye	Parliamentarian
December 1648	William Lenthall	Parliamentarian	Pye excluded in Pride's Purge – seat vacant	
1653	Woodstock was unrepresented in the Barebones Parliament			
1654	Lieutenant General Charles Fleetwood		Woodstock had only one seat in the First and Second Parliaments of the Protectorate	
1656	Major General William Packer		Woodstock had only one seat in the First and Second Parliaments of the Protectorate	
January 1659	Sir Jerome Sankey		Miles Fleetwood	
May 1659	William Lenthall		One seat vacant	
April 1660	Sir Thomas Spencer		Edward Atkyns	
1661	Sir Thomas Spencer		Sir William Fleetwood	
1674	Sir Thomas Spencer		Thomas Howard	
1679	Sir Littleton Osbaldeston		Nicholas Bayntun	
1681	Henry Bertie		Nicholas Bayntun	
1685	Richard Bertie		Sir Littleton Osbaldeston	
1689	Sir Thomas Littleton		Sir John D'Oyly	
1690	Sir Thomas Littleton		Thomas Wheate	
1695	Sir Thomas Littleton		James Bertie	
1702	Sir William Glynne		James Bertie	
1705	Lieutenant General William Cadogan	Whig	Hon. Charles Bertie	
1708	Lieutenant General William Cadogan	Whig	Sir Thomas Wheate	
1716	William Clayton		Sir Thomas Wheate	
1721	William Clayton		Charles Crisp	
1722	Samuel Trotman		Sir Thomas Wheate	
1727	Samuel Trotman		Marquess of Blandford	Whig
1732	Samuel Trotman		Hon. John Spencer	
1734	James Dawkins		Hon. John Spencer	
1746	James Dawkins		Hon. John Trevor, KC	
1747	John Bateman		Hon. John Trevor, KC	
1753	John Bateman		Anthony Keck	
1767	John Bateman		Hon. William Gordon	
1768	Lord Robert Spencer		Hon. William Gordon	
1771	John Skynner		Hon. William Gordon	
1774	John Skynner		William Eden	
1777	Viscount Parker	Tory	William Eden	
1784	Sir Henry Dashwood	Tory	Francis Burton	
1790	Sir Henry Dashwood	Tory	Lord Henry Spencer	
1795	Sir Henry Dashwood	Tory	The Lord Lavington	
1799	Sir Henry Dashwood	Tory	Charles Moore	
1802	Sir Henry Dashwood	Tory	Charles Abbot	Speaker
1806	Sir Henry Dashwood	Tory	Hon. William Eden	
1810	Sir Henry Dashwood	Tory	Hon. George Eden	Whig
1812	Sir Henry Dashwood	Tory	William Thornton	
1813	Sir Henry Dashwood	Tory	Hon. George Eden	Whig
1814	Sir Henry Dashwood	Tory	William Thornton	
1818	Sir Henry Dashwood	Tory	Lord Robert Spencer	
1820	John Gladstone	Tory	James Langston	Whig
1826	Marquess of Blandford	Tory	Lord Ashley	Tory
1830	Marquess of Blandford	Tory	Lord Charles Spencer-Churchill	Tory
1831	Viscount Stormont	Tory	Lord Charles Spencer-Churchill	Tory
1832	Constituency abolished			

=== 1832–1918 ===
Year	Member	Party
1832	George Spencer-Churchill, Marquess of Blandford	Conservative
1835	Lord Charles Spencer-Churchill	Conservative
1837	Henry Peyton	Conservative
1838	George Spencer-Churchill, Marquess of Blandford	Conservative
1840	Frederic Thesiger	Conservative
1844	John Spencer-Churchill, Marquess of Blandford	Conservative
May 1845	John Loftus, Viscount Loftus	Conservative
December 1845	Lord Alfred Spencer-Churchill	Conservative
1847	John Spencer-Churchill, Marquess of Blandford	Conservative
1857	Lord Alfred Spencer-Churchill	Conservative
1865	Henry Barnett	Conservative
1874	Lord Randolph Churchill	Conservative
1885	Francis William Maclean	Liberal
1886	Francis William Maclean	Liberal Unionist
1891	George Herbert Morrell	Conservative
1892	Godfrey Benson	Liberal
1895	George Herbert Morrell	Conservative
1906	Ernest Bennett	Liberal
January 1910	Alfred Hamersley	Conservative
1918	Constituency abolished	

== Elections ==
Decades:	1840s; 1850s; 1860s; 1870s; 1880s; 1880s; 1890s; 1900s; 1910s

=== Elections in the 1830s ===
General election 1830: Woodstock
Party	Candidate	Votes	%
Tory	Charles Spencer-Churchill	Unopposed	
Tory	George Spencer-Churchill	Unopposed	
Registered electors		c. 200	
Tory hold			
Tory hold			

General election 1831: Woodstock
Party	Candidate	Votes	%
Tory	Charles Spencer-Churchill	81	46.8
Tory	William Murray	74	42.8
Whig	James Silk Buckingham	12	6.9
Whig	Charles Richardson	6	3.5
Majority		62	35.9
Turnout		c. 87	c. 43.5
Registered electors		c. 200	
Tory hold			
Tory hold			

- Buckingham and Richardson each received 138 householder votes, but these were declared ineligible

General election 1832: Woodstock
Party	Candidate	Votes	%
Tory	George Spencer-Churchill	Unopposed	
Registered electors		317	
Tory hold			

General election 1835: Woodstock
Party	Candidate	Votes	%
Conservative	Charles Spencer-Churchill	Unopposed	
Registered electors		306	
Conservative hold			

General election 1837: Woodstock
Party	Candidate	Votes	%
Conservative	Henry Peyton	126	51.9
Whig	Charles Spencer-Churchill	117	48.1
Majority		9	3.8
Turnout		243	73.6
Registered electors		330	
Conservative hold			

Peyton resigned, causing a by-election.

By-election, 11 May 1838: Woodstock
Party	Candidate	Votes	%	±%
Conservative	George Spencer-Churchill	160	50.8	−1.1
Whig	Henry John Spencer-Churchill	155	49.2	+1.1
Majority		5	1.6	−2.2
Turnout		315	81.8	+8.2
Registered electors		385		
Conservative hold		Swing	−1.1	

=== Elections in the 1840s ===
Spencer-Churchill succeeded to the peerage, becoming 6th Duke of Marlborough and causing a by-election.

By-election, 20 March 1840: Woodstock
Party	Candidate	Votes	%	±%
Conservative	Frederic Thesiger	Unopposed		
Conservative hold				

General election 1841: Woodstock
Party	Candidate	Votes	%	±%
Conservative	Frederic Thesiger	Unopposed		
Registered electors		356		
Conservative hold				

Thesiger was appointed Solicitor General for England and Wales and decided to contest Abingdon, causing a by-election.

By-election, 22 April 1844: Woodstock
Party	Candidate	Votes	%	±%
Conservative	John Spencer-Churchill	Unopposed		
Conservative hold				

Spencer-Churchill resigned by accepting the office of Steward of the Chiltern Hundreds, causing a by-election.

By-election, 1 May 1845: Woodstock
Party	Candidate	Votes	%	±%
Conservative	John Loftus	Unopposed		
Conservative hold				

Loftus succeeded to the peerage, becoming 3rd Marquess of Ely and causing a by-election.

By-election, 18 December 1845: Woodstock
Party	Candidate	Votes	%	±%
Conservative	Alfred Spencer-Churchill	Unopposed		
Conservative hold				

General election 1847: Woodstock
Party	Candidate	Votes	%	±%
Conservative	John Spencer-Churchill	Unopposed		
Registered electors		404		
Conservative hold				

=== Elections in the 1850s ===
General election 1852: Woodstock
Party	Candidate	Votes	%	±%
Conservative	John Spencer-Churchill	Unopposed		
Registered electors		347		
Conservative hold				

General election 1857: Woodstock
Party	Candidate	Votes	%	±%
Conservative	John Spencer-Churchill	Unopposed		
Registered electors		336		
Conservative hold				

Spencer-Churchill succeeded to the peerage, becoming 7th Duke of Marlborough and causing a by-election.

By-election, 24 July 1857: Woodstock
Party	Candidate	Votes	%	±%
Conservative	Alfred Spencer-Churchill	Unopposed		
Conservative hold				

General election 1859: Woodstock
Party	Candidate	Votes	%	±%
Conservative	Alfred Spencer-Churchill	Unopposed		
Registered electors		310		
Conservative hold				

=== Elections in the 1860s ===
General election 1865: Woodstock
Party	Candidate	Votes	%	±%
Conservative	Henry Barnett	143	54.6	N/A
Liberal	Mitchell Henry	119	45.4	New
Majority		24	9.2	N/A
Turnout		262	91.6	N/A
Registered electors		286		
Conservative hold		Swing	N/A	

General election 1868: Woodstock
Party	Candidate	Votes	%	±%
Conservative	Henry Barnett	502	51.1	−3.5
Liberal	George Charles Brodrick	481	48.9	+3.5
Majority		21	2.2	−7.0
Turnout		983	87.2	−4.4
Registered electors		1,127		
Conservative hold		Swing	−3.5	

=== Elections in the 1870s ===
General election 1874: Woodstock
Party	Candidate	Votes	%	±%
Conservative	Randolph Churchill	569	58.5	+7.4
Liberal	George Charles Brodrick	404	41.5	−7.4
Majority		165	17.0	+14.8
Turnout		973	90.8	+3.6
Registered electors		1,071		
Conservative hold		Swing	+7.4	

=== Elections in the 1880s ===
General election 1880: Woodstock
Party	Candidate	Votes	%	±%
Conservative	Randolph Churchill	512	53.1	−5.4
Liberal	William Hall	452	46.9	+5.4
Majority		60	6.2	−10.8
Turnout		964	90.9	+0.1
Registered electors		1,060		
Conservative hold		Swing	−5.4	

Churchill was appointed Secretary of State for India, requiring a by-election.

By-election, 6 July 1885: Woodstock
Party	Candidate	Votes	%	±%
Conservative	Randolph Churchill	532	56.8	+3.7
Liberal	Corrie Grant	405	43.2	−3.7
Majority		127	13.6	+7.4
Turnout		937	86.4	−4.5
Registered electors		1,084		
Conservative hold		Swing	+3.7	

General election 1885: Woodstock
Party	Candidate	Votes	%	±%
Liberal	Francis William Maclean	4,327	51.1	+4.2
Conservative	Arthur Annesley	4,138	48.9	−4.2
Majority		189	2.2	N/A
Turnout		8,465	84.5	−6.4
Registered electors		10,012		
Liberal gain from Conservative		Swing	+4.2	

General election 1886: Woodstock
Party	Candidate	Votes	%	±%
Liberal Unionist	Francis William Maclean	Unopposed		
Liberal Unionist gain from Liberal				

=== Elections in the 1890s ===
Maclean resigned after being appointed a Master in Lunacy.

Morrell

By-election, 21 Apr 1891: Woodstock
Party	Candidate	Votes	%	±%
Conservative	George Herbert Morrell	4,448	54.2	N/A
Liberal	Godfrey Benson	3,760	45.8	New
Majority		688	8.4	N/A
Turnout		8,208	84.4	N/A
Registered electors		9,725		
Conservative hold				

General election 1892: Woodstock
Party	Candidate	Votes	%	±%
Liberal	Godfrey Benson	4,278	50.7	N/A
Conservative	George Herbert Morrell	4,167	49.3	N/A
Majority		111	1.4	N/A
Turnout		8,445	86.6	N/A
Registered electors		9,756		
Liberal gain from Liberal Unionist		Swing	N/A	

General election 1895: Woodstock
Party	Candidate	Votes	%	±%
Conservative	George Herbert Morrell	4,669	55.5	+6.2
Liberal	Godfrey Benson	3,740	44.5	−6.2
Majority		929	11.0	N/A
Turnout		8,409	86.1	−0.5
Registered electors		9,767		
Conservative gain from Liberal		Swing	+6.2	

=== Elections in the 1900s ===
General election 1900: Woodstock
Party	Candidate	Votes	%	±%
Conservative	George Herbert Morrell	Unopposed		
Conservative hold				

General election 1906: Woodstock
Party	Candidate	Votes	%	±%
Liberal	Ernest Bennett	4,585	52.5	New
Conservative	George Herbert Morrell	4,144	47.5	N/A
Majority		441	5.0	N/A
Turnout		8,729	87.4	N/A
Registered electors		9,985		
Liberal gain from Conservative				

=== Elections in the 1910s ===
General election January 1910: Woodstock
Party	Candidate	Votes	%	±%
Conservative	Alfred Hamersley	5,098	53.8	+6.3
Liberal	Ernest Bennett	4,378	46.2	−6.3
Majority		720	7.6	12.6
Turnout		9,476	90.0	+2.6
Registered electors		10,525		
Conservative gain from Liberal		Swing	+6.3	

General election December 1910: Woodstock
Party	Candidate	Votes	%	±%
Conservative	Alfred Hamersley	4,773	52.1	−1.7
Liberal	Ernest Bennett	4,381	47.9	+1.7
Majority		392	4.2	−3.4
Turnout		9,154	87.0	−3.0
Registered electors		10,525		
Conservative hold		Swing	-1.7	

General Election 1914–15:

Another General Election was required to take place before the end of 1915. The political parties had been making preparations for an election to take place and by July 1914, the following candidates had been selected;

- Unionist: Henderson
- Liberal:

== Sources ==
- Robert Beatson, A Chronological Register of Both Houses of Parliament (London: Longman, Hurst, Res & Orme, 1807)
- D Brunton & D H Pennington, Members of the Long Parliament (London: George Allen & Unwin, 1954)
- Cobbett's Parliamentary history of England, from the Norman Conquest in 1066 to the year 1803 (London: Thomas Hansard, 1808)
- The Constitutional Year Book for 1913 (London: National Union of Conservative and Unionist Associations, 1913)
- F W S Craig, British Parliamentary Election Results 1832–1885 (2nd edition, Aldershot: Parliamentary Research Services, 1989)
- J Holladay Philbin, Parliamentary Representation 1832 – England and Wales (New Haven: Yale University Press, 1965)
- Leigh Rayment's Historical List of MPs – Constituencies beginning with "W" (part 5)
