= Walter K. Firminger =

British churchman and historian

- Born: Walter Kelly Firminger; 28 September 1870; Edmonton, Middlesex
- Died: 27 February 1940 (aged 69); Hampton Court
- Occupation: Churchman
- Known for: Historian of India

Walter Kelly Firminger (28 September 1870 – 1940) was archdeacon of Calcutta and a historian of India who was the first editor of Bengal, Past & Present, the journal of Calcutta Historical Society. He was a fellow of the Royal Geographical Society.

== Early life ==
Walter Firminger was born on 28 September 1870 in Lower Edmonton, Middlesex, the son of Captain, the Reverend, Thomas Augustus Charles Firminger (died 1884), East India Company chaplain and Georgiana Firminger., née Buckner. He had two brothers, both clergymen and four sisters. He was educated at Lancing College and Bury St. Edmunds Grammar School before going up to Merton College, University of Oxford. He married Eveleen Sarah Miles in 1898. They did not have children. At the time of the 1891 British census, while Firminger was at Merton, the family were living at Went House, Uley Green, Uley, in Gloucestershire, England.

== Career ==
Firminger was ordained deacon at Hereford in 1893. He served as a UMCA missionary in Zanzibar from 1893 to 1897 and was subdean in 1896. He was a curate in Margate from 1897 to 1898. He had clerical appointments in India from 1899 to 1923 being Archdeacon of Calcutta from 1914 to 1923. He was editor of the Indian Churchman from 1900 to 1905. He was Vicar of Padbury, Bucks from 1923 to 1926. He was Chaplain to the King at Hampton Court Palace from 1926 until he died in 1940. B.Litt. and D.D.

He was the first editor of Bengal, Past & Present, the journal of Calcutta Historical Society, and a fellow of the Royal Geographical Society.

== Selected publications ==
=== Authored works ===
- Over-population, facts and figures. 1891.
- The idea of an Oxford modern ethical society. Oxford, 1891. (With W. Gibson)
- A criticism of Böhm-Bawerk's doctrine of capital and interest. Oxford: Printed by J. Parker, (1892?)
- Some thoughts on the recent criticism of the life and works of John Henry Cardinal Newman. Oxford: Printed for private circulation by James Parker, 1892.
- What then did Dr. Newman do? Being an inquiry into his share in the church revival and a brief statement of the leading features of his religious teaching. Oxford: Blackwell, 1892.
- Thacker's guide to Calcutta. Calcutta: Thacker, Spink & Co. 1906.

=== Edited and translated works ===
- Molinari, G. (1894) Religion. London: S. Sonnenschein; New York: Macmillan. (Translator)
- Missionary sermons by various writers. London, 1898. (Editor)
- Fullarton, William, Peter Campbell, and William Anderson. (1909) The Diaries of three surgeons of Patna, 1763. Calcutta: Calcutta Historical Society. (Editor)
- Grand, George Francois. (1910) The narrative of the life of a gentleman long resident in India. Calcutta: Calcutta Historical Society, 1910. (Editor)
- The Sylhet District records. Shillong: Assam Secretariat Printing Office, 1913-1919. (Editor)
- The fifth report from the Select Committee of the House of Commons on the affairs of the East India Company, dated 28th July, 1812. Calcutta: R. Cambray, 1917-18. (Editor)
