= Godfrey Benson, 1st Baron Charnwood =

British politician (1864–1945)

Godfrey Rathbone Benson, 1st Baron Charnwood (6 November 1864 – 3 February 1945), was an English author, academic, Liberal politician and philanthropist.

Benson was born in Alresford, Hampshire, the fourth son of William Benson, a barrister, and Elizabeth Soulsby Smith. The actor-manager Sir Frank Benson and the designer William Arthur Smith Benson were his brothers. He was educated at Winchester and Balliol College, Oxford, graduating in 1887 with a First in literae humaniores, and would later become a Philosophy lecturer at Balliol. He was called to the bar by the Inner Temple in 1898.

Benson was involved in Liberal politics and represented Woodstock in the House of Commons from 1892 to 1895, when he was defeated. He then unsuccessfully stood in St. Pancras West in 1900 and Worcestershire West in 1906. He served as Mayor of Lichfield between 1909 and 1911. In the latter year Benson was raised to the peerage as Baron Charnwood, of Castle Donington in the County of Leicester.

Lord Charnwood was the author of many works, including two biographies, the much-acclaimed Abraham Lincoln (1916) and Theodore Roosevelt (1923), and a detective novel, Tracks in the Snow (1906), which was reviewed in The Bookman He also wrote a useful look into early modern Biblical criticism trends, and presented his own viewpoints in According To Saint John, which he dedicated to George Ridding. He was also involved in charitable work with the deaf and disabled, becoming the first President of the National Institute for the Deaf from 1924 until 1935.

On 25 July 1934, Lord Charnwood gave a speech about the Holodomor (the famine in Ukraine) at the debates in British parliament. His speech was based on the information he received from Theodor Innitzer, Cardinal Archbishop of Vienna, and British journalists William Henry Chamberlin and Malcolm Muggeridge. He stressed the artificial nature of the Holodomor.

He married Dorothea Mary Roby Thorpe, daughter of Roby Thorpe, in 1897. They had four children, including Hon. Eleanor Theodora Roby Benson, John Roby Benson (2nd Baron Charnwood) and Antonia Mary, Viscountess Radcliffe. Lady Charnwood died in 1942.

Charnwood died in London in February 1945, aged 80, and was succeeded in the barony by his second but only surviving son, John.

== Works ==
- Tracks in the Snow (London: Longmans, Green and Company, 1906; repub. Macmillan & Co., Toronto, Ernest Benn Limited, London, 1927, Dial Press, NY. 1928)
- Considerations on a Scheme of a Federal Government for the United Kingdom (London : William Clowes & Sons, 1902)
- Legislation for the Protection of Women (London: P.S. King & Son, 1912)
- The Federal Solution c-authored with John Archibald Murray Macdonald (London, T. Fisher Unwin, 1914)
- Abraham Lincoln (London: Constable & Co., 1916, New York: Henry Holt & Co., 1917)
- Abraham Lincoln; address ... at the dedication of the statue of Abraham Lincoln on the State house grounds, Oct. 6, 1918 (Springfield, Illinois State Historical Society. 1920)
- Concerning Abraham Lincoln serial (Anglo-French review, vol. III, no.1 February 1920; vol. III, no. 2 March 1920; vol. III, no. 4 May 1920; vol. III, no. 5 June 1920; vol. III, no. 6 July 1920; vol. IV, no. 1 August 1920; vol. IV, no. 3, October 1920; vol. IV, no. 4 November 1920) and in "The Living Age" volume 306, number 3966, July 10, 1920, Boston, MA)
- Walt Whitman and America, published in Essays by Divers Hands : Being the Transactions of the Royal Society of Literature of the United Kingdom, p. 103-123, (New Series [i.e. 3rd] Vol. 1 Oxford University Press, London, 1921)
- His talk with Lincoln : being a letter written by James M. Stradling, (Cambridge, MA: Riverside Press, 1922)
- Theodore Roosevelt (London:Constable & Co., 1923, Boston, MA: The Atlantic Monthly Press (1923)
- According To Saint John (London: Hodder and Stoughton, 1925, Boston, MA: Little, Brown and Co., 1925)

- As Editor-

- Philosophical lectures and remains of Richard Lewis Nettleship, fellow and tutor of Balliol College, Oxford [Published in Two Volumes. Vol.1 co-edited with Andrew Cecil Bradley. Vol 2 republished as "Lectures on the Republic of Plato"] (London, Macmillan & Co., 1897)
- Recalled to life; A journal devoted to the care, re-education, and return to civil life of disabled sailors and soldiers (London : Bale, Sons & Danielsson, 1917)

Parliament of the United Kingdom
Preceded by George Morrell	Member of Parliament for Woodstock; 1892–1895	Succeeded by George Morrell
Peerage of the United Kingdom
New creation	Baron Charnwood; 1911–1945	Succeeded by John Benson
