= Baron Charnwood =

Title in the Peerage of the United Kingdom

Baron Charnwood, of Castle Donington in the County of Leicester, was a title in the Peerage of the United Kingdom. It was created on 29 June 1911 for the author, academic, Liberal politician and philanthropist Godfrey Benson. The title became extinct on the death of his son, the second Baron, on 1 February 1955.

== Barons Charnwood (1911) ==
- Godfrey Rathbone Benson, 1st Baron Charnwood (1864–1945)
- John Roby Benson, 2nd Baron Charnwood (1901–1955)
