= Thomas Strangman =

British barrister (1873–1971)

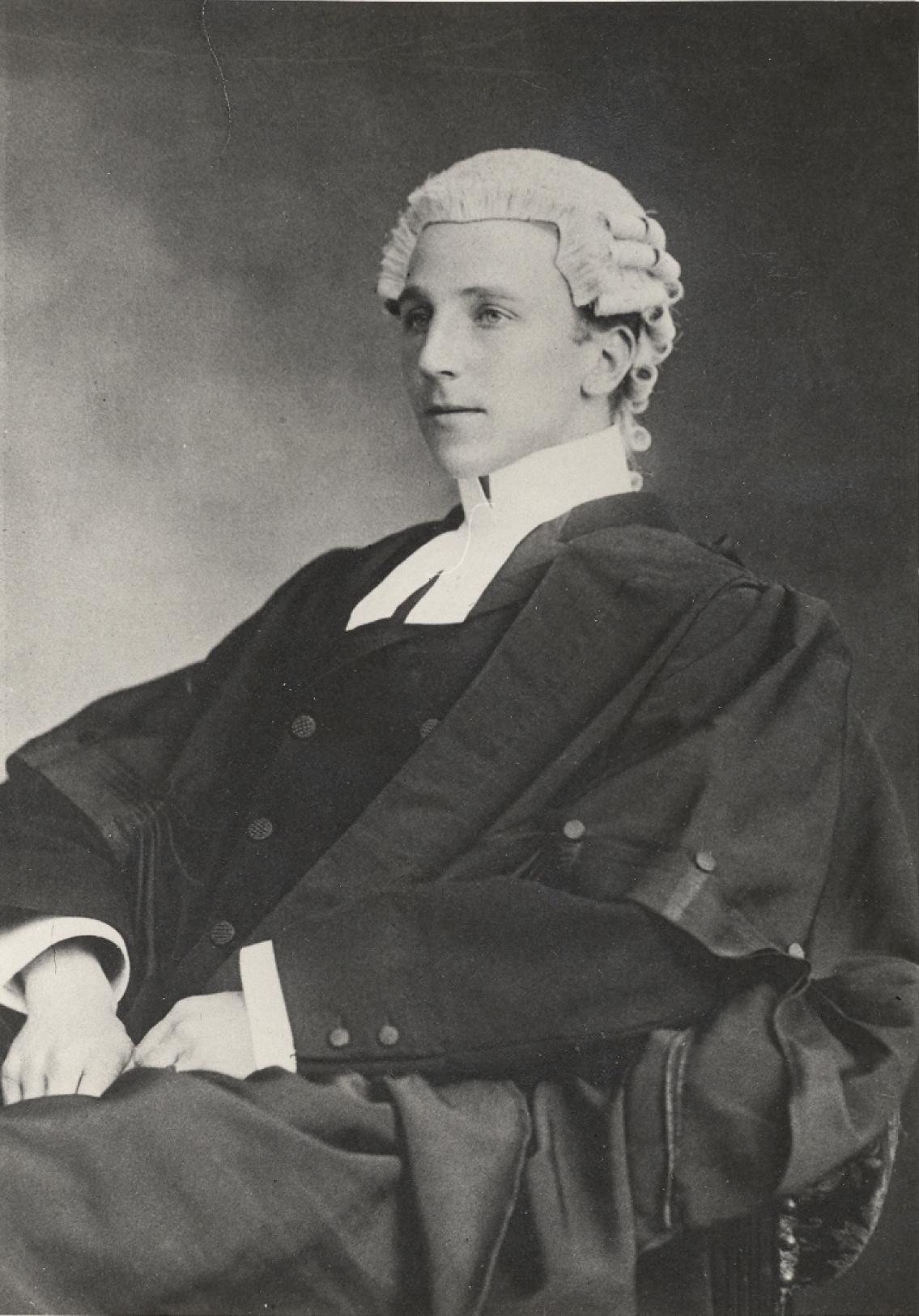
Sir Thomas Strangman in his wig and gown

Sir Thomas Joseph Strangman QC (7 January 1873 – 8 October 1971) was a British barrister who spent much of his career in India.

Strangman was educated at Charterhouse School and Trinity Hall, Cambridge and was called to the bar by the Middle Temple in 1896. He practised in Bombay, twice served as Advocate-General of Bombay (1908–1915 and 1916–1922), and as such was an ex officio member of the Bombay Legislative Council. As Advocate-General he was the first lawyer to successfully prosecute Gandhi. He was knighted in the 1920 New Year Honours.

In 1922 he returned to England and attempted to enter politics for the Conservative Party, unsuccessfully contesting Crewe in 1923 and Wolverhampton East in 1924. He then returned to practise in Bombay.

In about 1929 he returned to England permanently and specialised in Indian appeals before the Judicial Committee of the Privy Council. He was highly successful in this practice and took silk in 1938. He became a bencher of Lincoln's Inn in 1944.

He was also at various times chairman of the Eastern Bank, the Banque Belge pour l'Etranger, the Shanghai Electric Corporation and the Singapore Traction Company.

In January 1928 Strangman's younger daughter, Josephine, married Kenelm Lee Guinness of the Guinness brewing family. The marriage was dissolved in 1936.
