= Tracks in the Snow (novel) =

1906 novel

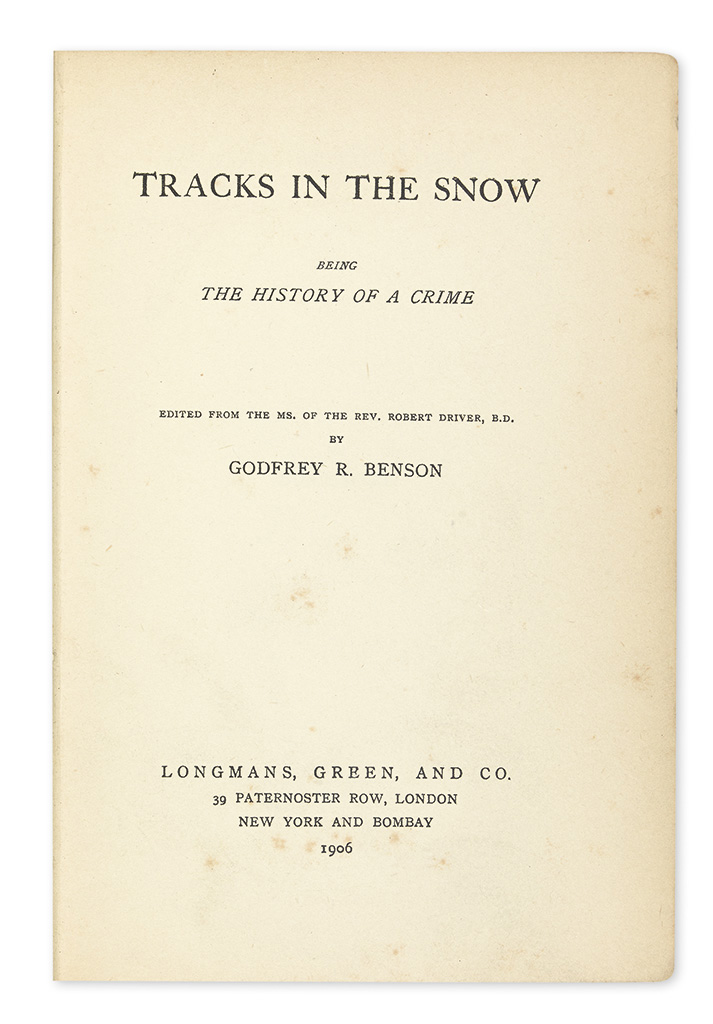
- Author: Godfrey Benson
- Language: English
- Genre: Detective
- Publisher: Longman, Green & Co.
- Publication date: 1906
- Publication place: United Kingdom
- Media type: Print

Tracks in the Snow is a 1906 detective novel by the British writer and politician Godfrey Benson. It was his only crime novel, he later became better known for his non-fiction works such as biographies of Abraham Lincoln (1916) and Theodore Roosevelt (1923). A popular success, it was republished in 1928, but it later fell into obscurity. Martin Edwards included it in his list of a hundred classic crime novels and noted "Benson's thoughtful, well-crafted prose, his insights into human behaviour, and the way in which the story touches on issues such as free will and the ramifications of Britain's imperial past combine to make his brief venture into the crime genre notable".

Set in 1896, the story is narrated by Robert Driver, a rector in rural England, and recounts a recent dinner party hosted by the former diplomat Eustace Peters at his country estate. The following morning Peters is found in his bed, stabbed to death. The footprints in the thick snow outside appear to implicate the gardener, Reuben Trethewy, of murder. The case takes Driver more than a year to solve and eventually turns out to be connected to Peters's life abroad.

== Bibliography ==
- Tracks in the Snow itself
- Edwards, Martin. The Story of Classic Crime in 100 Books. Poisoned Pen Press, 2017.
- Herbert, Rosemary. Whodunit?: A Who's Who in Crime & Mystery Writing. Oxford University Press, 2003.
- Kestner, Joseph A. The Edwardian Detective: 1901-15. Routledge, 2017.
