= Sir Thomas Wheate, 2nd Baronet =

English politician (1693–1746)

Sir Thomas Wheate, 2nd Baronet (2 March 1693 – 1 May 1746) was an English politician who was the Member of Parliament for Woodstock from 1722 to 1727.

He was the eldest son of Sir Thomas Wheate, 1st Baronet, whom he succeeded in 1721, inheriting Glympton Park, near Woodstock.

He served briefly as a cornet in Col. William Stanhope's Dragoons in 1715. He was elected Member of Parliament for Woodstock in 1722, sitting until 1727.

He married Mary Gould, the daughter and coheiress of Thomas Gould of Oak End, Iver, Buckinghamshire, with whom he had four daughters. On his death in 1746 he was buried at Glympton, Oxfordshire and succeeded by his brother, George Wheate.

Parliament of Great Britain
Preceded by Charles Crisp	Member of Parliament for Woodstock; 1722–1727	Succeeded by William Godolphin, Marquess of Blandford
Baronetage of England
Preceded by Thomas Wheate	Baronet (of Glympton); 1721–1746	Succeeded by George Wheate
