= Lawrence Hugh Jenkins =

British Indian judge

The Right Honourable Sir Lawrence Hugh Jenkins KCIE
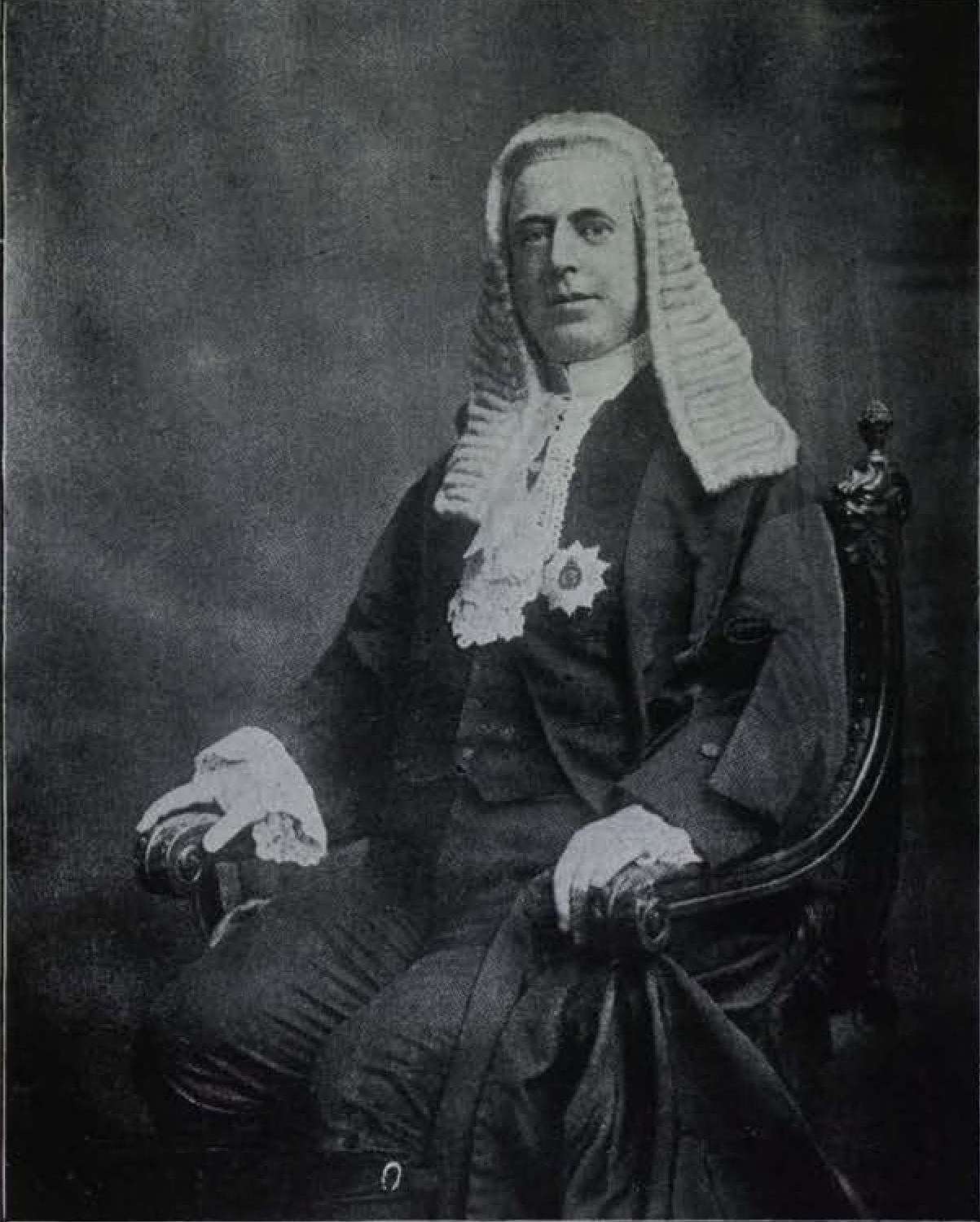

6th Chief Justice of Calcutta High Court
- In office 19 April 1909 – 13 November 1915
- Appointed by: Edward VII
- Preceded by: Francis William Maclean
- Succeeded by: Lancelot Sanderson

7th Chief Justice of Bombay High Court
- In office 20 April 1899 – 14 March 1909
- Appointed by: Queen Victoria
- Preceded by: Louis Addin Kershaw
- Succeeded by: Basil Scott

Judge of Calcutta High Court
- In office 24 April 1896 – 19 April 1899
- Appointed by: Queen Victoria

Personal details
- Born: 22 December 1857 Cardigan, Wales
- Died: 1 October 1928 (aged 70) London, England
- Education: Cheltenham College
- Occupation: Jurist

Sir Lawrence Hugh Jenkins, KCIE (22 December 1857 – 1 October 1928), was a British judge. He was the chief justice of the Calcutta and Bombay High Court in British India, as well as a member of the Judicial Committee of the Privy Council.

== Family ==
Jenkins was born in 1857 at The Priory, Cardigan. He was the younger son of solicitor Richard David Jenkins and Elizabeth, daughter of Thomas Lewis.

== Career ==
Jenkins passed from Cheltenham College to the University of Oxford, and was called to the Bar at Lincoln's Inn in 1883.

He was appointed as puisne judge of Calcutta High Court on 24 April 1896, thereafter became the chief justice of the Bombay High Court for on 20 April 1898 and after serving as such for nearly a decade he was transferred back to Calcutta High Court as chief justice on 19 April 1909 and served as such till 13 November 1915.

Thereafter, Jenkins was selected as a member of the Council of India. On 17 August 1899 he was knighted, and appointed a Knight Commander of the Order of the Indian Empire (KCIE) in the 1903 Durbar Honours. Between 1909 and 1915 he was the chief justice of the Calcutta High Court after Justice Francis William Maclean. He also served as District Grand Master of Freemasons for Bombay and Bengal and took an active part in all important public movements on social questions relating to British India.

In his judgeship, Jenkins delivered several verdicts in relation to high-profile conspiracy and bombings, including the Alipore Bomb conspiracy case.

He was sworn of the Privy Council in 1916 and served as a member of the Judicial Committee of the Privy Council.

== Death ==
He died at his home in London on 1 October 1928.

Legal offices
Preceded by Sir Francis William Maclean	Chief Justice of Bengal; 1909–1915	Succeeded by Sir Lancelot Sanderson
