= Glympton Park =

Former deer park in Oxfordshire, England

Coordinates: 51.8930°N 1.3853°W

Glympton Park is a former deer park at Glympton, 3.5 miles (5.6 km) north of Woodstock, Oxfordshire, England. It includes Glympton House (an 18th-century country house) and has a 2,000 acres (810 ha) estate including the village of Glympton, its Norman parish church of St. Mary, 32 stone cottages and 167 acres (68 ha) of parkland.

The house and attached summerhouse are Grade II listed.

== History ==
Glympton House is the successor to a manor house that had occupied the site since the 16th century or earlier. The property was owned by John Cupper and his wife, Audrey Peyto, and their descendants from 1547 to 1632. William Wheate bought the manor in 1633 and either he or one of his successors had the house remodelled later in the 17th century. By the early part of the 18th century it had an H-shaped plan with north and south courtyards each flanked on three sides by wings of the house.

In the first half of the 18th century either Sir Thomas Wheate, 1st Baronet or Sir Thomas Wheate, 2nd Baronet had the house remodelled with a Georgian elevation of seven bays. By the early part of the 19th century the western range of the old house had been demolished. When the 2nd Baronet died without a male heir in 1746, the baronetcy passed to his brother Sir George Wheate, 3rd Baronet but Glympton Park became the dower house of his widow Mary.

George Henry Barnett, the nephew of Sir Jacob Wheate, 5th Baronet, inherited Glympton Park in 1846. In 1849 Barnett removed the east and west wings from the main front, re-faced the main front in Bath stone in mid-18th century style and added an Italianate kitchen block on the east side. Barnett moved the main entrance to the west side, and gave the new entrance a Tuscan porch. Glympton Park remained in the Barnett family until Benjamin Barnett sold it in 1944.

It was purchased in 1944 by Alan Paul Good, owner of Lagonda. When Good died in 1953, it was purchased by W. Garfield Weston. In 1957 it was purchased by mining magnate Eric William Towler. When Towler died in 1988 it was purchased by Alan Bond.

In 1992, Glympton Park was bought for £8 million by Prince Bandar bin Sultan, then Saudi ambassador to the US, after Alan Bond went bankrupt. Bandar spent £42m on restoration work, installing security features and a replica English pub inside the house.

In February 2021, Glympton Estates Ltd was sold to the King of Bahrain, Hamad bin Isa Al Khalifa and his son Salman bin Hamad bin Isa al-Khalifa for £120 million.

== Sources and further reading ==
- Arkell, W.J. (1948). "The building-stones of Blenheim Palace, Cornbury Park, Glympton Park and Heythrop House, Oxfordshire" (PDF). Oxoniensia. XIII. Oxford Architectural and Historical Society: 49–54. ISSN 0308-5562.
- Barnett, Rev. Herbert (1923). Glympton – the History of an Oxfordshire Manor. Oxford: Oxford University Press.
- Crossley, Alan (ed.); Baggs, A.P.; Colvin, Christina; Colvin, H.M.; Cooper, Janet; Day, C.J.; Selwyn, Nesta; Tomkinson, A. (1983). A History of the County of Oxford. Victoria County History. Vol. 11: Wootton Hundred (northern part). pp. 120–131.
- Robinson, John Martin (1998). Glympton Park Estate. London: Phoebe Phillips Editions. ISBN 978-1-86077-077-7.
- Sherwood, Jennifer; Pevsner, Nikolaus (1974). Oxfordshire. The Buildings of England. Harmondsworth: Penguin Books. p. 613. ISBN 0-14-071045-0.
