= Sir Thomas Wheate, 1st Baronet =

English landowner and Whig politician

Sir Thomas Wheate, 1st Baronet (6 September 1667 – 25 August 1721), of Glympton Park, Oxfordshire was an English landowner and Whig politician who sat in the English and British House of Commons between 1695 and 1721.

== Early life ==
Wheate was the only son of Thomas Wheate of Glympton Park, near Woodstock and his wife Frances Jenkinson (died 1706), daughter of Sir Robert Jenkinson, 1st Baronet. In 1668, at a year old, he succeeded his father, inheriting Glympton Park. He married Anne Sawbridge, daughter of George Sawbridge, bookseller, of London, by licence dated 24 May 1687.

== Career ==
In 1689, Wheate was made freeman and bailiff of Oxford and appointed a Gentleman of the Privy Chamber, which post he held until 1702. He was returned unopposed as Member of Parliament for Woodstock at the 1690 English general election and three weeks later also stood unsuccessfully for Oxfordshire, where he had a bitter contest with his uncle Sir Robert Jenkinson, the 2nd baronet. He was recognized as a Whig, and Court supporter. In the face of a big electoral challenge at Woodstock, he decided not to stand at the 1695 English general election. He was created a baronet on 2 May 1696 and served as High Sheriff of Oxfordshire for the year 1696 to 1697. His further attempts to enter parliament as a Whig, in a Tory dominated county, over the next few years met with failure. At the 1698 English general election his backing by Thomas Wharton was insufficient to win Oxfordshire, where he failed again in a by-election in November 1699. In the first general election of 1701 he considered standing again but declined to face a contest. In November 1701 he was put up for Oxford by the city's Whigs, but received a very low number of votes, and at the 1702 English general election he was beaten into fourth place in the poll.

When Queen Anne granted the manor of Woodstock to the Duke of Marlborough in 1705, this was a particular piece of good fortune for Wheate. Stone from his quarries at Glympton was used in large quantities to build Blenheim Palace, and with the Duke's Whig views, Wheate became a close political associate and one of the leading Whigs in the county. Marlborough returned him for Woodstock at the 1708 British general election. He voted for the naturalization of the Palatine refugees in 1709, and for the impeachment of Dr Sacheverell in 1710 but was otherwise inactive. He was returned again at the 1710 British general election and on 7 December 1711, voted for the ‘No Peace Without Spain’ motion. On 18 June 1713 he voted against the French commerce bill. Marlborough was in temporary exile from November 1712, and Wheate was virtually the custodian of the Duke's electoral interests at Woodstock. He supervised the repaving the town, which Marlborough had undertaken in preparation for the 1713 British general election when Wheate was returned again for Woodstock. The election was declared void on 15 March 1714 but he was re-elected a week later.

Wheate was returned for Woodstock again at the 1715 British general election and voted with the Administration in every recorded division. He was appointed Storekeeper of the Ordnance in 1717 and held the post for the rest of his life. He was assistant and magistrate for Banbury in 1718.

== Death and legacy ==
Wheate died at Glympton on 25 August 1721 and was buried at Glympton church, as was his wife, Anne who predeceased him in 1719. He was succeeded by his eldest son Thomas Wheate.

Parliament of England
Preceded by Sir Thomas Littleton; Sir John D'Oyly	Member of Parliament for Woodstock; 1690–1695; With: Sir Thomas Littleton	Succeeded by Sir Thomas Littleton; Hon. James Bertie
Parliament of Great Britain
Preceded by William Cadogan; Hon. Charles Bertie	Member of Parliament for Woodstock; 1708–1721; With: William Cadogan 1708–16; William Clayton 1716–21	Succeeded by William Clayton; Charles Crisp
Political offices
Preceded by Hon. Dixie Windsor	Storekeeper of the Ordnance; 1717–1721	Succeeded by George Gregory
Baronetage of England
New creation	Baronet (of Glympton); 1696–1721	Succeeded by Thomas Wheate
