= Cadogan (surname) =

Cadogan (English: /kəˈdʌɡən/) is a surname of Welsh or Irish origin and is a variant of the Welsh name Cadwgan (Welsh pronunciation: [kaˈduːɡan]), as well as an anglicisation of the Irish surname Ó Ceadagáin. Notable people with the surname include:

- Alan Cadogan (born 1993), Irish hurling player
- Alexander Cadogan (1884–1968), British civil servant and Chairman of Board of Governors of the BBC
- Charles Cadogan (disambiguation), multiple people
- Edward Cadogan (disambiguation), multiple people
- Eoin Cadogan (born 1986), Irish Gaelic football and hurling player
- Frederick William Cadogan (1821–1904), British barrister and politician
- George Cadogan (disambiguation), multiple people
- Gerald Cadogan (born 1986), American footballer
- Gerald Cadogan, 6th Earl Cadogan (1869–1933), British soldier
- Henry Cadogan (disambiguation), multiple people
- John Cadogan (1930–2020), British organic chemistry professor
- Kevin Cadogan (born 1970), American guitarist and founding member of Third Eye Blind
- Kieron Cadogan (born 1990), English footballer
- León Cadogan (1899–1973), Paraguayan ethnologist
- Mary Cadogan (1928–2014), English writer on children's fiction
- Nancy Cadogan (born 1979), British figurative painter
- Peter Cadogan (1921–2007), English writer and political activist
- Sean Cadogan, Australian physicist, working in Canada
- Susan Cadogan (born 1951), Jamaican reggae singer
- William Cadogan (disambiguation), multiple people
