= Frank Cadogan Cowper =

English painter (1877–1958)

Frank Cadogan Cowper RA
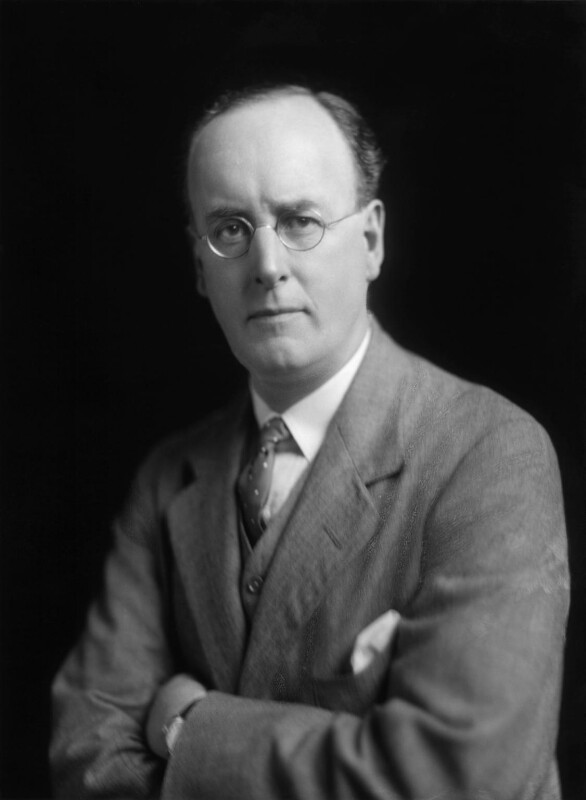
- Cowper in 1932
- Born: 16 October 1877; Wicken, Northamptonshire, England, United Kingdom
- Died: 17 November 1958 (aged 81); Cirencester, Gloucestershire, England, United Kingdom
- Education: Royal Academy Schools
- Known for: Painting
- Notable work: Vanity (1907), The young Duchess (1917), La Belle Dame sans Merci (1926)
- Movement: Pre-Raphaelite Romanticism
- Parents: Frank Cowper; E. E. Cowper
- Relatives: Edward Cadogan (grandfather); Edward Cadogan (cousin); Sir William Carlile (uncle)
- Awards: Royal Academician RWA Academician
- Patron: Evelyn Waugh

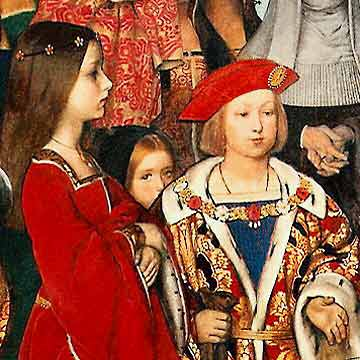
Detail of Margaret, Henry VIII, and Princess Mary being visited by Erasmus, dated c. 1910

Frank Cadogan Cowper RA RWS RP RWA (16 October 1877 – 17 November 1958) was an English painter and illustrator of portraits, historical and literary scenes, also described as "The Last Pre-Raphaelite".

== Life and work ==
Lucretia Borgia Reigns in the Vatican in the Absence of Pope Alexander VI, ca. 1910

Frank Cadogan Cowper was born in Wicken, Northamptonshire, the son of an author and early pioneer of coastal cruising in yachts, Frank Cowper, and grandson of Edward Cadogan, the Rector of Wicken.

Cadogan Cowper was educated at Cranleigh before going on to study art, first at St John's Wood Art School in 1896 and then at the Royal Academy Schools from 1897 to 1902. He first exhibited at the Royal Academy in 1899 and achieved critical acclaim two years later with his An Aristocrat Answering the Summons to Execution, Paris 1791 (1901). In 1902, Cadogan Cowper spent six months as an apprentice helping Edwin Austin Abbey RA complete a monumental canvas painting The Coronation of King Edward VII (now in the Royal Collection) before travelling to Italy to continue his studies.

Cadogan Cowper worked in oils, tempera and watercolours, and simultaneously worked as a book illustrator, providing the illustrations for Sir Sidney Lee's The Imperial Shakespeare. He contributed to a mural in the Houses of Parliament in 1910-12 along with John Byam Liston Shaw, Ernest Board and Henry Arthur Payne.

As art trends changed, Cadogan Cowper increasingly exhibited his portrait paintings and still continued to produce historical and literary works of art.

Cadogan Cowper retired from London and moved to Gloucestershire. One of his paintings, The Ugly Duckling, was voted "their favourite painting" by visitors to the Cheltenham Art Gallery & Museum in 2005.

The record price for a Cadogan Cowper painting at sale is £469,250 for Our Lady of the Fruits of the Earth (1917) at Christie's in London on 17 December, 2011.

The National Gallery of London staged an exhibition Saint Francis of Assisi which included the work of Frank Cadogan Cowper in 2023.

In 2024, the Musei di San Domenico in Forlì, Italy, hosted the exhibition Pre-Raphaelites: A Modern Renaissance that featured the work of Cadogan Cowper Vanity.

== Awards ==
- Royal Academy / ARA 1907 / RA 1934
- Royal Watercolour Society / ARWS 1904 / RWS 1911
- Royal Society of Portrait Painters / RP 1921
- Royal West of England Academy / RWA Academician
- Society of Graphic Fine Art / From the early days of the Society: Hon. Member 1920
- Royal Academy Schools Competition silver medal and Armitage Prize, 1899

== Patron(s) ==
- Evelyn Waugh
- The Wills Family of Miserden Park

== Studio Locations ==
- 1902 (6 mos)》 Morgan Hall, Fairford, Gloucestershire
- 1903 – 1905 》 1 Edwardes Square Studios, Kensington, London
- 1905 – 1909 》 38 Barrow Hill Road, St John's Wood, N.W., London
- 1909 – 1924 》 2 Edwardes Square Studios, Kensington, London
- 1924 – 1940 》 3 Tite Street, SW3, London
- 1940 – 1944 》 The Studio, Les Blanches, St Martin's, Jersey
- 1944 – 1951 》 Hughenden House, Fairford, Gloucestershire
- 1951 – 1958 》 Summerton, Berkeley Road, Cirencester, Wiltshire

== Gallery ==
Vanity (1907)

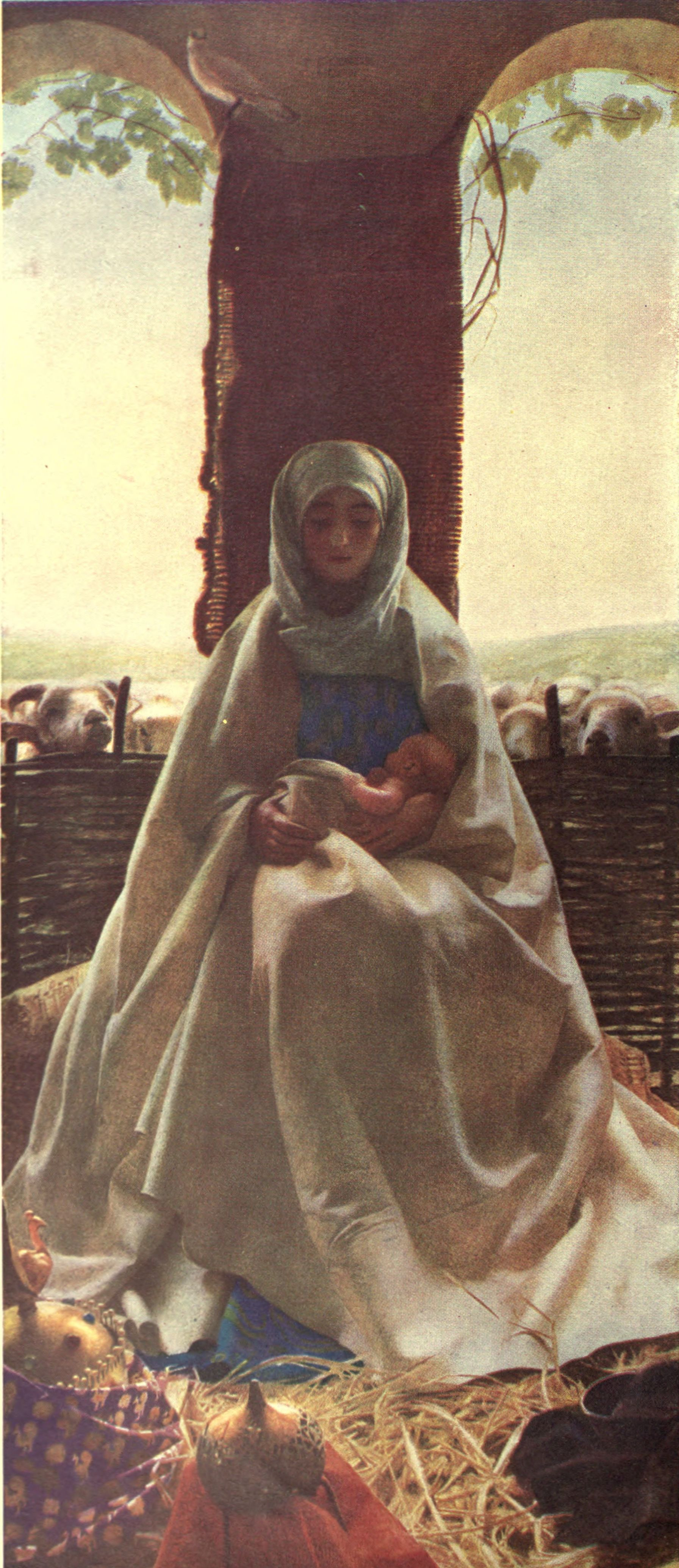
The Morning of the Nativity (1912)

== List of paintings (selection) ==
- Rapunzel (Singing from the Tower) (1900)
- Hamlet - The churchyard scene (1902)
- Lady Clare and her lily-white doe (1902)
- Francis of Assisi and the Heavenly Melody (1904) Exhibited at the National Gallery, London in 2023.
- St Agnes in Prison Receiving from Heaven the 'Shining White Garment' (1905)
- La Belle Dame sans Merci (1905) Exhibited at the Royal Society of Painters in Water Colours the same year; The International Fine Arts Exhibition, Rome, Italy in 1911.
- Molly, Duchess of Nona (1905)
- A Merciless Beauty (1906)
- Mariana in the South (1906) Exhibited at the Royal Society of Painters in Water Colours the same year.
- Vanity (1907) Diploma Work for the Royal Academy
- Love Potion (1907) Exhibited at the Royal Society of Painters in Water Colours the same year.
- How the Devil, Disguised (1907) Exhibited at the Royal Academy and Fine Arts Society the same year.
- Venetian Ladies Listening to the Serenade (1909) Exhibited at the Royal Academy the same year.
- Erasmus and Thomas More Visit the Children of Henry VII at Greenwich, 1499 (1910)
- Lucretia Borgia Reigns in the Vatican in the Absence of Pope Alexander VI (1908–14)
- The Love Letter (1911) Exhibited at the Royal Academy the same year.
- Sir William Walter Carlile, 1st Baronet, OBE, DL, JP (1862–1950) (1913)
- The Hon. Mrs. Hanbury-Tracy (1914) Exhibited at the Royal Academy the same year.
- Faust's first sight of Marguerite (1915) Exhibited at the Royal Academy the same year.
- Our Lady of the Fruits of the Earth (1917)
- The Blue Bird (1918) Exhibited at the Royal Academy the same year
- The Cathedral Scene from 'Faust': Margaret tormented by the Evil Spirit (1919)
- Vanity (1919)
- Fair Rosamund and Queen Eleanor (1920) Exhibited at the Royal Academy the same year.
- Violet Miriam Nightingale Clay, Lady Vernon (1920)
- Mrs E.H. Evans–Combe (1920)
- Lady Gordon Taylor (1923) Private Collection
- The Damozel of the Lake, called Nimue the Enchantress (Malory's "Le Morte d'Arthur") (1924)
- Lady Hildebrand Harmsworth (1925) Exhibited at the Royal Academy the same year.
- La Belle Dame sans Merci (1926) Exhibited at the Royal Academy the same year.
- Margaret, Daughter of Montague Napier, Esq. (1926)
- The Hon. Vita Sackville-West (1927) Exhibited at the Royal Academy the same year.
- Titania Sleeps (1928)
- Sir Havilland De Sausmarez (1930) Exhibited at the Royal Academy the same year.
- Mrs. Albert S. Kerry (1930) Exhibited at the Royal Academy the same year.
- Pamela, Daughter of Lieut. Col. M.F. Halford (1930) Exhibited at the Royal Academy the same year.
- Lilla, Daughter of E.M. Maclaurin, Esq. Married to N.H. Signor Sacra De Jordanow. (1930)
- Miss Mona Sayer, Grand-daughter of Sir Walter Maude, KCIE CSI (1936)
- The Fortune–Teller: "Beware of a Dark Lady" (1940)
- La Belle Dame sans Merci (1946)
- The Ugly Duckling (1950)
- The Legend of Sir Perceval (1952–53)
- The Four Queens Find Lancelot Sleeping (1954)
- Elizabeth, Daughter of Major General F.V.B. Willis (1955) Exhibited at the Royal Academy the same year.
- The Golden Bowl (1956) Exhibited at the Royal Academy the same year.
- Self-Portrait (1957) Exhibited at the Royal Academy the same year.
- The Patient Griselda
- Portrait of Professor Rey
- Lancelot slays the Caitiff Knight Sir Tarquin and rescues the fair lady and the knight in captivity
- Eve
