= Edward Cadogan (rower) =

British rower (1833–1890)

Edward Cadogan (1833–1890) was a British clergyman and rower who won Silver Goblets at Henley Royal Regatta.

Cadogan was born at Caerfyrddin Sain Pedr, Carmarthenshire, Wales, the son of Colonel Edward Cadogan and his wife Virginie de Beaumassoir. He was educated at Christ Church, Oxford and was a rower at the university. In 1854 he partnered Walter Francis Short to win Silver Goblets at Henley. In 1855 the pair were runners up in Silver Goblets to A. A. Casamajor and Josias Nottidge.

Cadogan took holy orders and in 1872 became Rural Dean and Rector of Wicken, Northamptonshire. He added a new wing at the Rectory at cost of £300 in 1873, not long after his arrival in the parish. Cadogan was concerned with the village school which, in 1875, he claimed that he found 'struggling into life and health'. Within three years Cadogan placed it on a sound footing and there were about 80 children on the books. He appealed for increased subscriptions and threatened a school board if these were not forthcoming. He offered to hand the management over to the subscribers or their elected representatives.

Cadogan killed himself at his Rectory in Wicken on 16 April 1890, an inquest jury returned a verdict of "suicide whilst temporarily insane".

Cadogan married Alice Smith in 1856. Their daughter Blanche Ann married Sir William Carlile, MP for Buckingham. Their son, Lieutenant-Colonel Henry Osbert Samuel Cadogan, 1st Battalion, Royal Welch Fusiliers, was killed in action on 30 October 1914. A grandson, Edward Henry Cadogan, played first-class cricket for Hampshire. Cadogan's second daughter Edith Elise married fellow author and yachtsman Francis Cowper; their eldest son Frank Cadogan Cowper became a noted artist.
