= Lord George Lennox =

British Army officer and politician

General Lord George Lennox
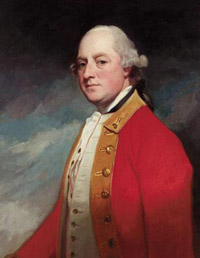
- Portrait by George Romney
- Born: 29 November 1737
- Died: 25 March 1805 (aged 67)
- Spouse: Lady Louisa Kerr
- Military career
- Allegiance: Great Britain
- Branch: British Army
- Rank: General
- Commands: 33rd Regiment of Foot
- Conflicts: Seven Years' War

General Lord George Henry Lennox (29 November 1737 – 25 March 1805) was a British Army officer and politician who sat in the House of Commons of Great Britain from 1761 to 1790.

== Early life ==
He was the second son of Charles Lennox, 2nd Duke of Richmond, and was a great-grandson of King Charles II of England. He was a brother of the famous Lennox sisters.

== Military career ==
On 17 December 1751, Lennox was commissioned an ensign in the 2nd Regiment of Foot Guards. He was promoted to be captain of a company in the 25th Regiment of Foot on 23 March 1756. From 1758 to 1762 George Lennox was the Colonel of the 33rd Regiment of Foot. In 1757 a second battalion (2nd/33rd) of the 33rd Regiment had been raised. In 1758, this battalion became an independent regiment, the 72nd Regiment of Foot. At that time, his elder brother Charles Lennox had been the Colonel of the 33rd and was then appointed Colonel of the new regiment. George Lennox took command of the 33rd Regiment (1st/33rd). At the beginning of May 1758 the 33rd Regiment was stationed in Blandford, Dorset and was then moved to the Isle of Wight to take part in an attack on the French coast at St Malo on 5 May in the Seven Years' War.

On 1 August, both Brothers Regiments (33rd & 72nd) were involved in a highly successful raid on Cherbourg, which resulted in the destruction of 30 French ships, and the capture of 200 guns and rockets, plus a number of French Regimental Colours and a large quantity of booty. After this raid George Lennox and the 33rd Regiment remained inactive, garrisoned on the Isle of Wight on internal security duties.

On 29 December 1762, he was appointed Colonel of the 25th Regiment of Foot, which he commanded until his death. On 16 February 1784, he was appointed Constable of the Tower of London.

== Parliamentary career ==
He was the Member of Parliament for Chichester from 1761 to 1767 and for Sussex from 1767 to 1790. He was succeeded in the latter seat by his son. He was appointed a member of the Privy Council in 1784.

== Later life ==
In 1772, he was elected Mayor of Chichester.

== Family ==
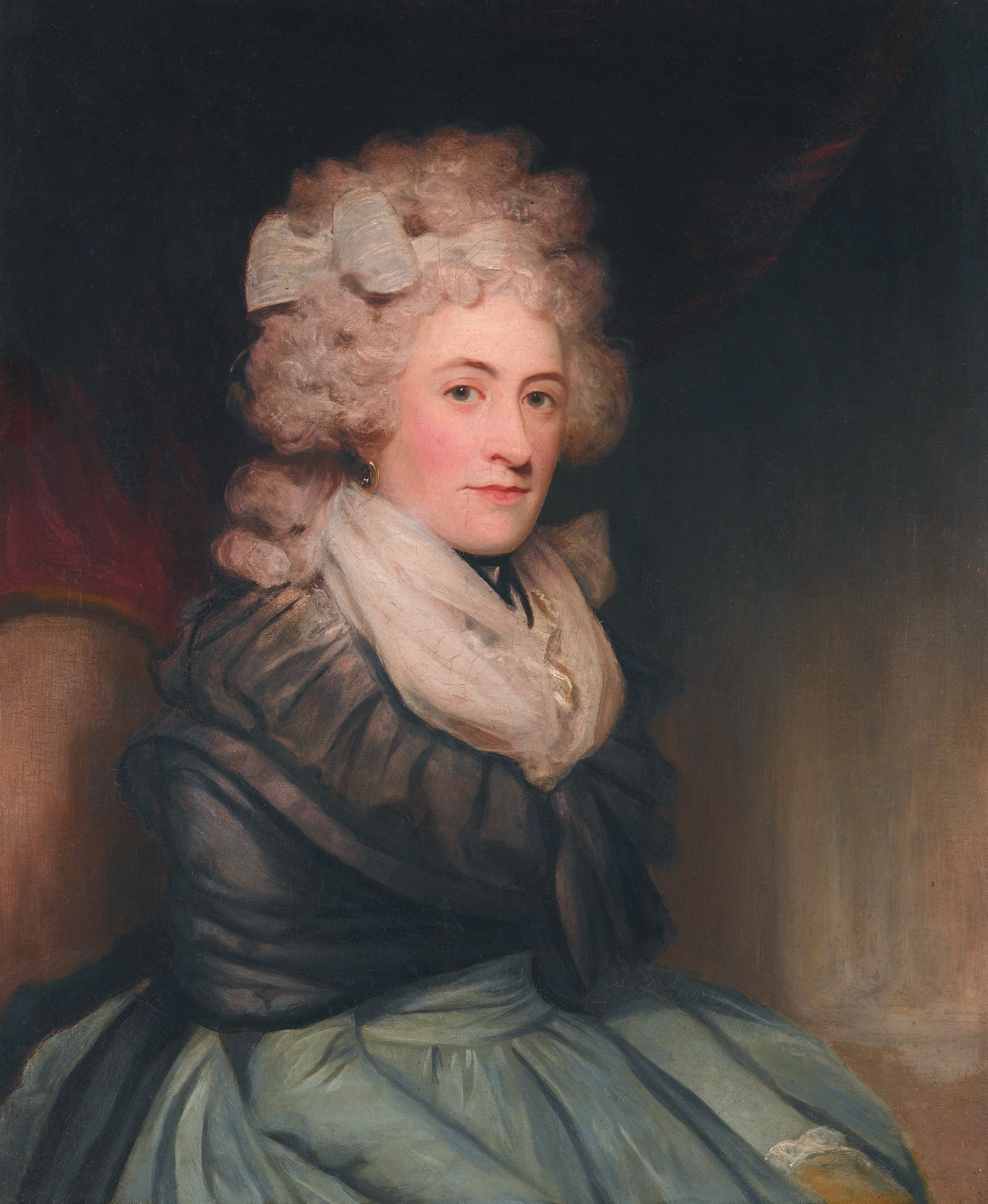
Emilia Charlotte Lennox (John Hoppner)

Lord George Lennox married Lady Louisa Kerr, daughter of William Kerr, 4th Marquess of Lothian in 1759, and they had four children:

- Lady Maria Louisa Lennox (2 November 1760 – July 1843).
- Lady Emily Charlotte Lennox (December 1763 – 19 October 1832), married Adm. Hon. Sir George Cranfield Berkeley and had issue.
- Charles Lennox, 4th Duke of Richmond (9 September 1764 – 28 August 1819).
- Lady Georgiana Lennox (6 December 1765 – 20 January 1841), married Henry Bathurst, 3rd Earl Bathurst.

Despite the Hanoverian side taken by his father, George made an arranged marriage for his own son Charles with the heiress of Clan Gordon, a notable Jacobite family.

== Ancestry ==
Ancestors of Lord George Lennox

16. Charles I of England
8. Charles II of England
17. Henrietta Maria of France
4. Charles Lennox, 1st Duke of Richmond
18. Guillaume de Penancoët, Seigneur de Kérouaille
9. Louise Renée de Penancoët de Kérouaille, Duchess of Portsmouth
19. Marie de Ploeuc de Timeur
2. Charles Lennox, 2nd Duke of Richmond
20. Robert Brudenell, 2nd Earl of Cardigan
10. Francis Brudenell, Lord Brudenell
21. Anne Savage
5. Anne Brudenell
22. Thomas Savile, 1st Earl of Sussex
11. Frances Savile
23. Anne Villiers
1. Lord George Lennox
24. William Cadogan
12. Henry Cadogan
25. Elizabeth Roberts
6. William Cadogan, 1st Earl Cadogan
26. Hardress Waller
13. Bridget Waller
27. Mary (Elizabeth) Dowdall
3. Sarah Cadogan
28. Joan Munter
14. Jan Munter
29. Margaretha Geelvinck
7. Margaret Cecilia Munter
30. Hendrick Trip
15. Margaretha Trip
31. Cecilia Godin

Parliament of Great Britain
Preceded by John Page; Hon. Augustus Keppel	Member of Parliament for Chichester with John Page; 1761–1767	Succeeded by John Page; William Keppel
Preceded by John Butler; Thomas Pelham	Member of Parliament for Sussex; 1767–1790; With: Thomas Pelham 1767–1768; Richard Harcourt 1768–1774; Sir Thomas Spencer Wilson 1774–1780; Thomas Pelham 1780–1790	Succeeded by Thomas Pelham; Charles Lennox
Military offices
Preceded by Sir Henry Erskine, Bt	Colonel of the 25th Regiment of Foot; 1762–1805	Succeeded by Hon. Charles FitzRoy
Preceded by The Earl Waldegrave	Governor of Plymouth; 1784–1805	Succeeded by The Earl of Chatham
Honorary titles
Preceded by The Earl Cornwallis	Constable of the Tower; Lord Lieutenant of the Tower Hamlets; 1784	Succeeded by The Earl Cornwallis
