= Archibald Webb =

- Born: 19 February 1866; Kensington, London
- Died: 23 January 1947 (aged 80); Hackney, London
- Other names: Signed his works as arch webb
- Occupations: Painter and illustrator
- Years active: 1884–1935
- Known for: Illustrating boys' adventure books
- Notable work: Drawing of a Viking long-ship

John Archibald Webb RBA (1866–1947) was a British painter and illustrator who illustrated over 150 books.

== Three artists called Archibald Webb ==
There were three artists named Archibald Webb, which sometimes creates confusion:

- Archibald Webb (1792–1883), a painter, largely of maritime scenes, with two works in national collections in the UK and father to painter James Webb (1825–1895).
- John Archibald Webb RBA (1866–1947), about whom this article is about. He was the grandson of Archibald Webb (1792–1883) and the nephew of James Webb (1835–1895). He signed his work arch webb, or aw enclosed by a rectangular border in small drawings surrounded by with text. Some of his paintings (landscapes mainly) are signed arch webb rba.
- Archibald Bertram Webb (1887–1944), a wood engraver, poster and landscape painter who emigrated to Australia in 1915, but briefly returned to the UK in 1934. He signed his work A. B. Webb, and can be seen in his famous poster advertising Wales for the Great Western Railway. A.B. Webb was known for his pictures of the Australian landscape and his use of woodcuts.

Unfortunately, John Archibald Webb and Archibald Bertram Webb are sometimes confused and the former's work is often attributed to the latter, even in reference books on illustrators, even though illustrations by arch webb were published in 1895, when A. B. Webb as only 8. Unfortunately the confusion even extends to such sources as Peppin and Micklethwait who not only ascribed Webb's book illustrations to W. B. Webb, but also illustrate the section with a drawing by Webb (clearly signed arch webb).

== Early life ==
Webb was born in Kensington on 19 February 1866 in Kensington, to John Warburton Webb (1792–1869) and Eliza née Mitchell who had married less than a year earlier on 20 May 1865. Webb's grandfather, Archibald Webb (1792–1883), was an artist who specialised in marine scenes, his uncles Byron and James were also artists. His father died when Webb was three and his uncle James Webb adopted him, as shown in the 1871 Census. His grandfather also lives with James.

It is not clear what training Webb had, but as both his uncle and grandfather were distinguished artists Kirkpatrick says that it was highly likely that they taught him. He may gave spent some time in Holland given that so many of his earliest paintings had Dutch themes including: Evening in Dordrecht, Holland; Dutch Coasters; and Dordrecht.

== Marriage and family ==
He married Florence Charlotte Daniels, born on 11 February 1866, at Holy Trinity Church in South Hampstead, London on 21 February 1889. Both bride and groom were 23 years of age. The wedding announcement named him as Arch Webb and said that he was James Webb's adopted son. The 1891 census found the new couple living with the bride's parents. They had five children, one girl, Florence Mary Ellen (1891), and three boys: Henry James Frederick (1894); Robert John (1900); and Archibald David (1905). All of the children survived their parents.

== Work ==
Webb was exhibiting in London in at age 18 in 1884. He was sometimes distinguished from his grandfather (who only died in 1883 at 91 years) with the suffix Junior He was elected a member of the Royal Society of British Artists in 1890, entitling him to use RBA after his name. He signed some of his paintings Arch Webb RBA. Webb seems to have stopped exhibiting in the mid 1890s.

Kirkpatrick states his first book illustration was for The Life and Strange Surprising Adventures of Robinson Crusoe by Defoe. This reissue of the work was from publisher Ernest Nister of London. Webb, together with J Finnemore and D. Thompson, illustrated this "very beautifully printed and in every way luxurious edition" – Bristol Mercury. While Kirkpatrick give 1896 as the year of publication, it was already on the desk of the Bristol Mercury in 1895.

Nister also brought out My Robinson Crusoe Story Book: retold for the little ones by L. L. Weedon with colour plates by an unidentified artist, and black and white drawings by Webb. This book is in the digital archive of the Baldwin Library of Historical Children's Literature in the University of Florida, here it has been dated as c. 1890. The book was reissued several times. Kirkpatrick lists the 1910 reissue, and The English Catalogue of Books for 1912 lists another reissue in September 1912.

=== Sample illustrations by Webb ===
The following illustrations were prepared by Webb for the 1910 New Edition of Roger Willoughby: a Story of the Times of Benbow by William Henry Giles Kingston, published by Henry Frowde, Hodder and Stoughton.

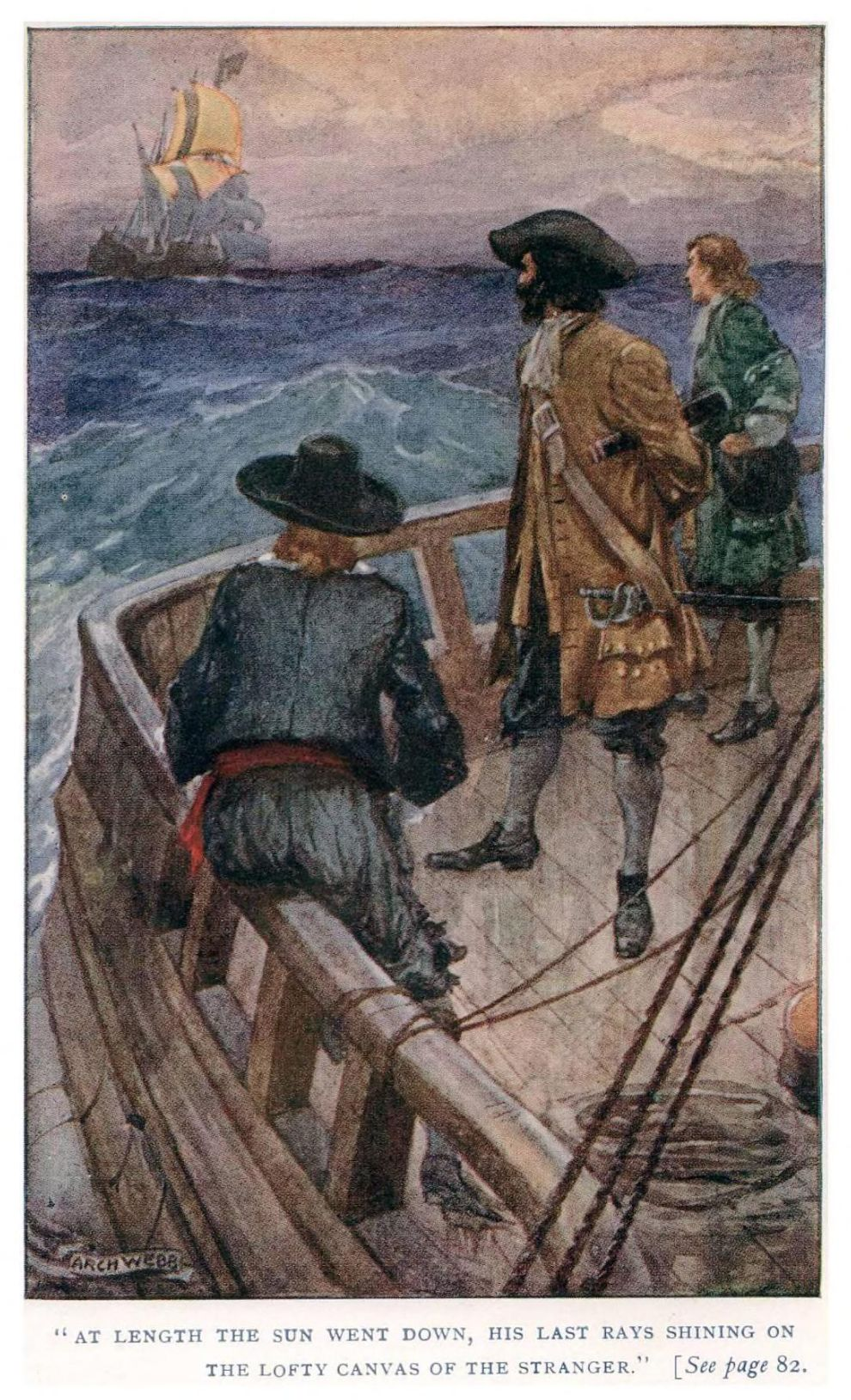
At length the sun went down.

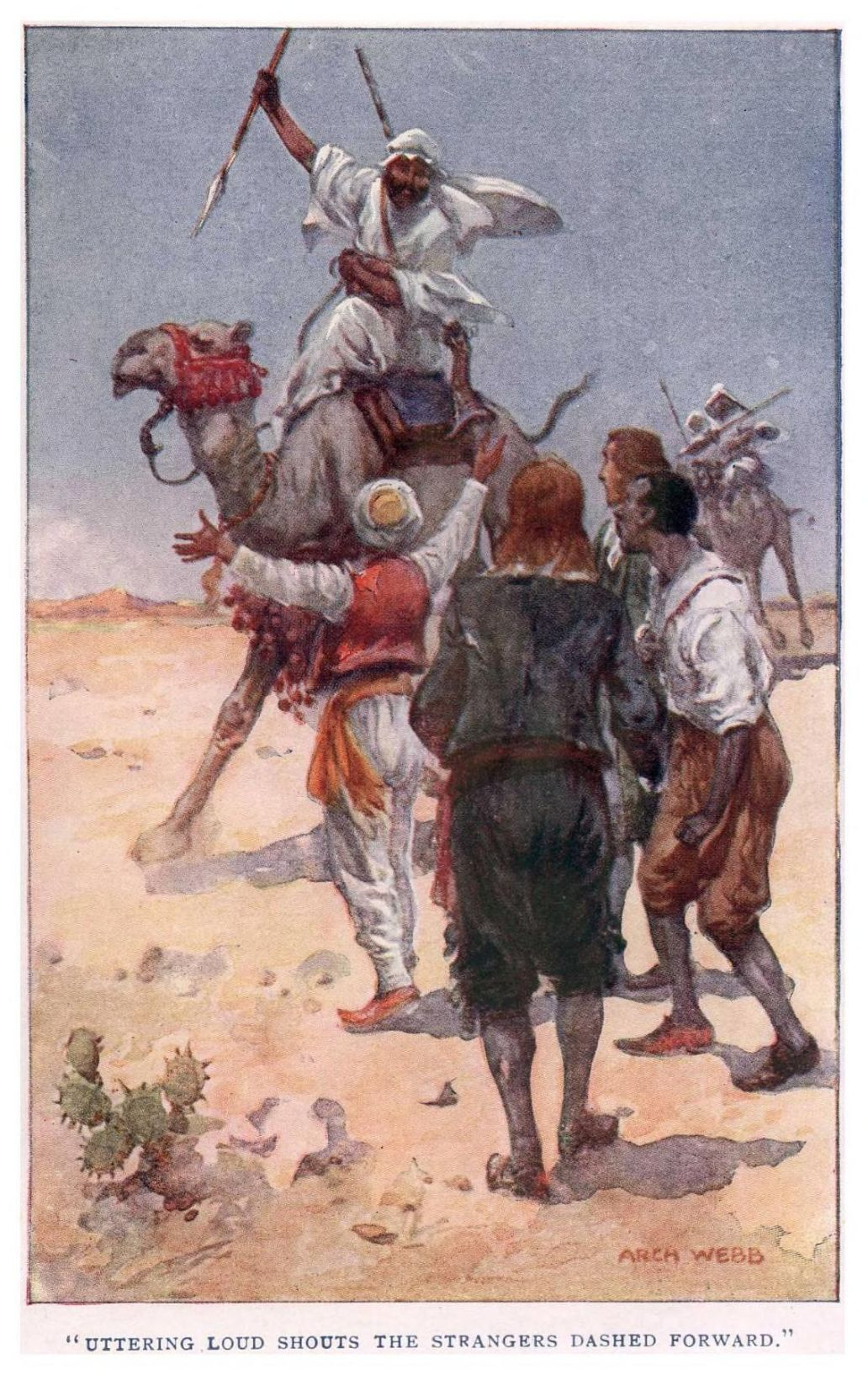
The strangers rushed up

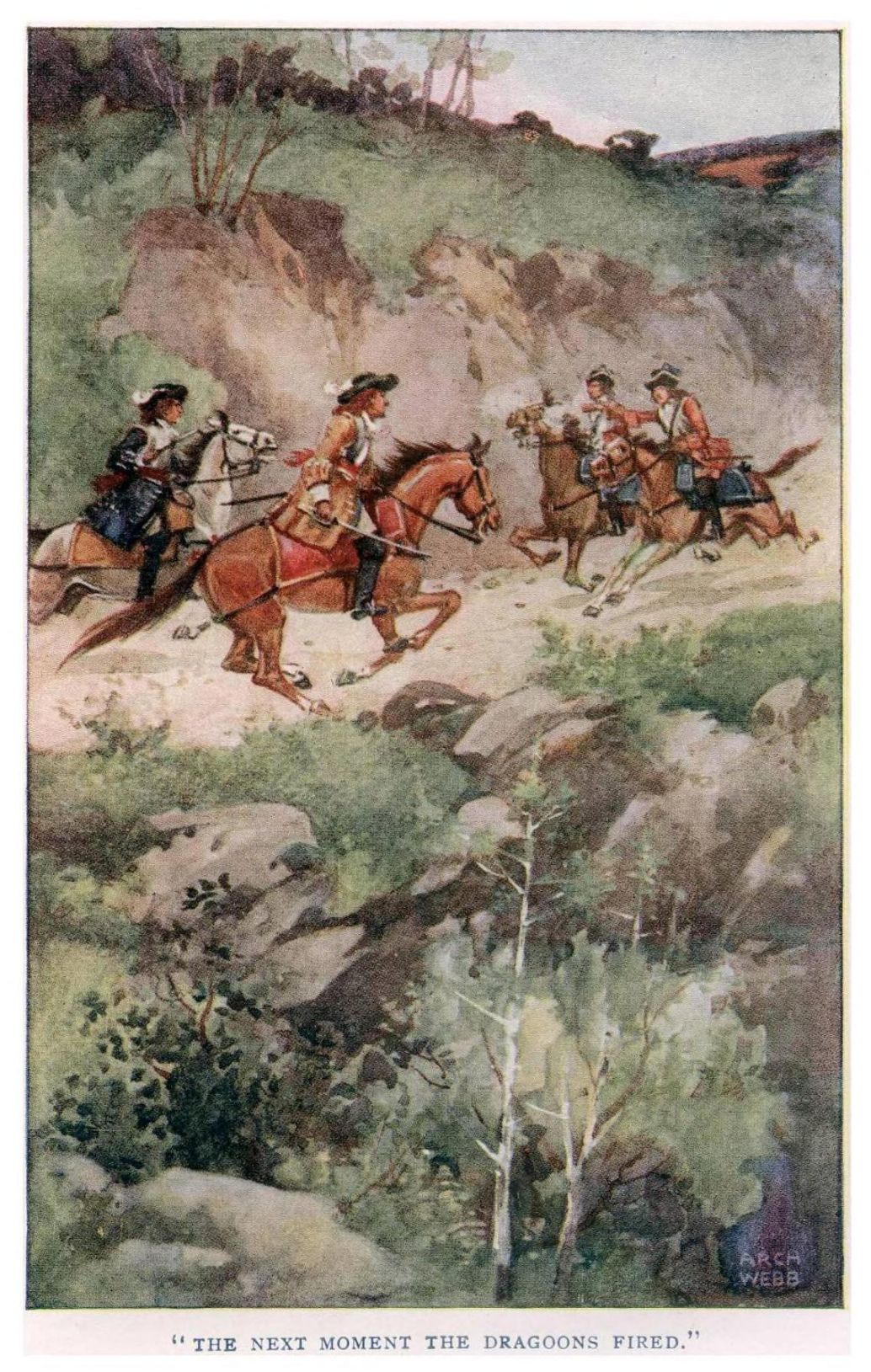
The Dragoons fired

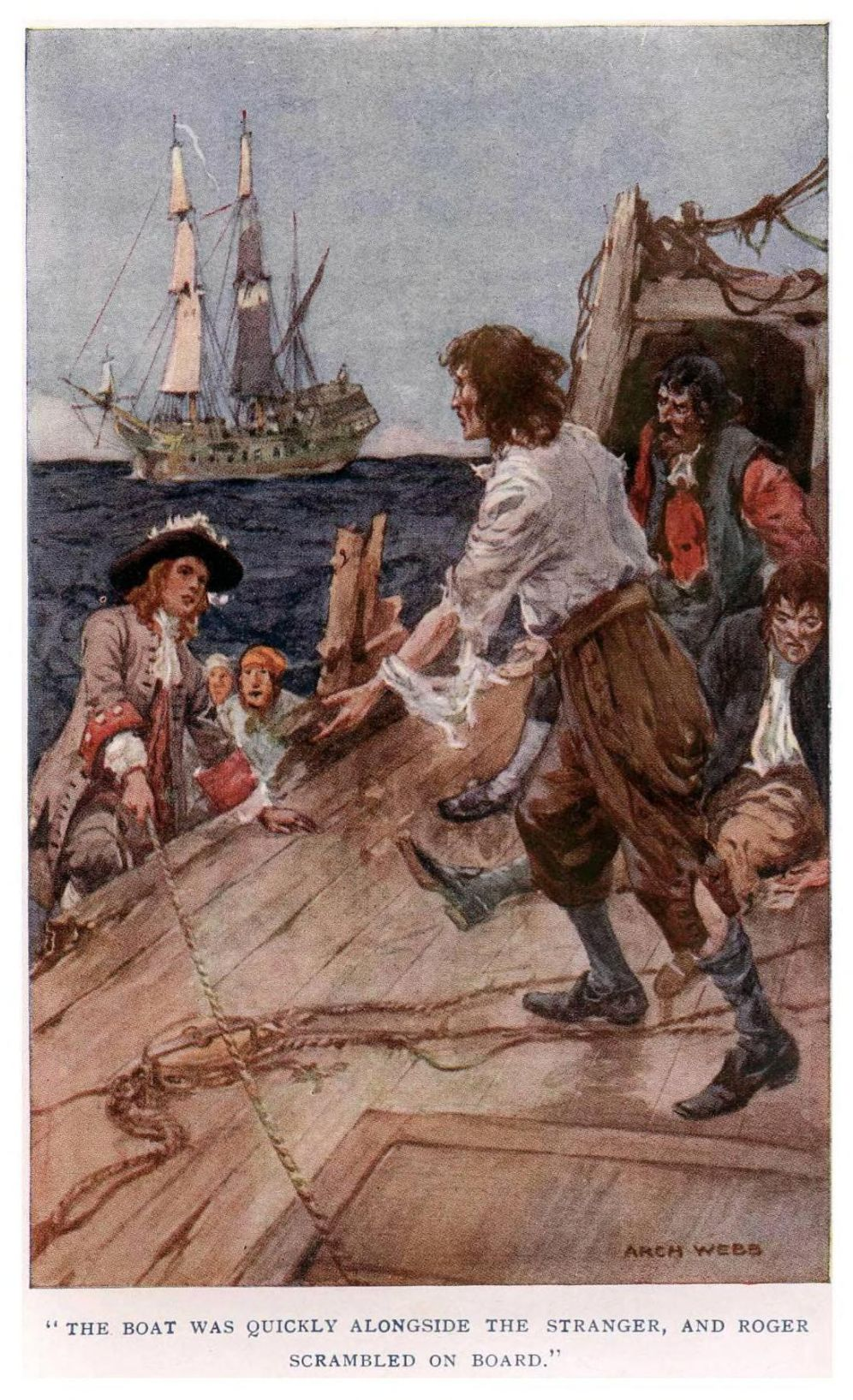
He scrambled aboard

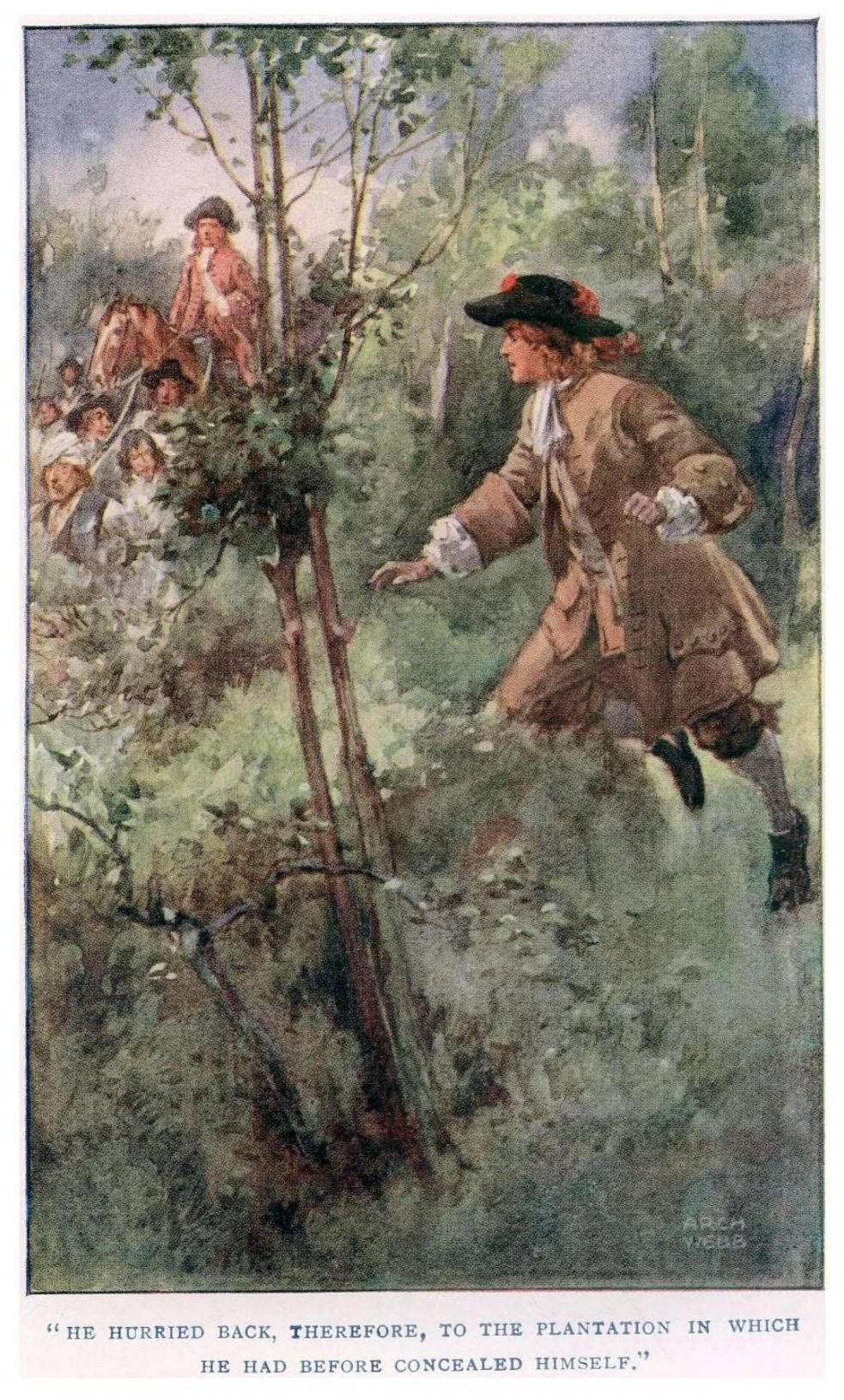
He hurried back

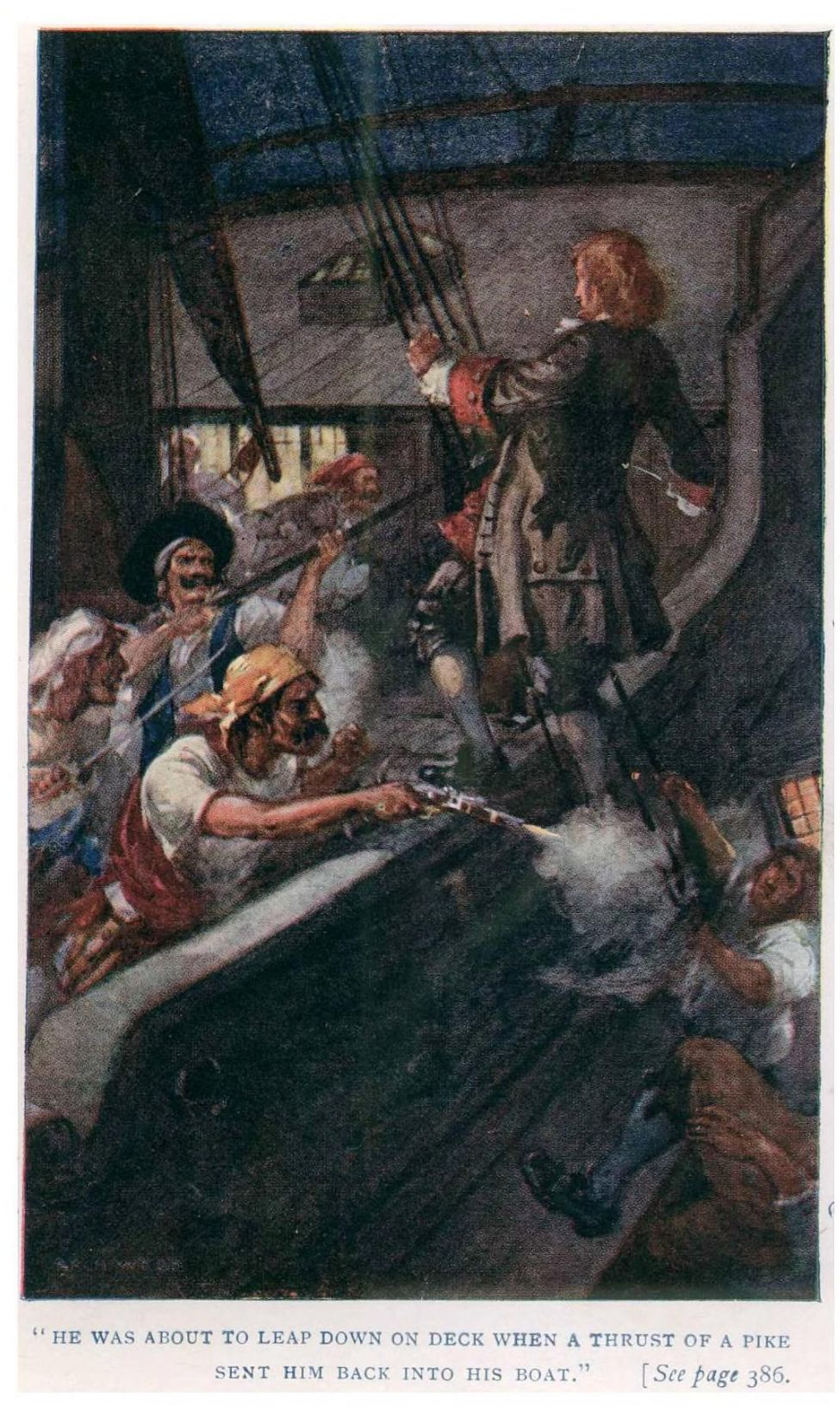
A stab of a pike

==== Authors illustrated by Webb ====
Webb was popular as an illustrator for boys' adventure stories Webb illustrated around 150 books for a range of authors, either in first editions or reissues, including:

- Harold Avery (1867–1943), who wrote school stories for both boys and girls.
- R. M. Ballantyne (1825–1894), a prolific Scottish author of juvenile fiction and an accomplished water-colourist.
- M. C. Barnard (1885–1968), an English schoolteacher who wrote girls' school stories and published about ten of them in the 1920s.
- Reginald Berkeley (1890–1935), a British Army officer, awarded a Military Cross in the First World War, served as Liberal Party MP, who wrote mostly dramas and screenplays.
- Walter Besant (1836–1901), an English novelist and historian, most famous for his series on the history of London, usually wrote novels together with James Rice.
- Tom Bevan (1868–1938), a British author of boys' adventure fiction.
- Joseph Bowes (1852–1928), an Australian Methodist cleric who wrote juvenile fiction, mostly with Australian themes.
- F. S. Brereton (1872–1957), who wrote tales of Imperial heroism for children.
- T. C. Bridges (1868–1944), Thomas Charles Bridges, was born in France, educated at Marlborough College, spent the first eight years of his adult life in Florida before returning penniless to England. He looked to his pen to make his living, and having his first boy's story well received he became a prolific contribut to boys' papers, and published at least thirty books of adventure fiction.
- E. L. Bryson, who wrote non-fiction books for children for the McDougall's Educational Co., starting in the 1920s. (Note: Kirkpatrick gives the name as E. L. Byron in his list of works illustrated by Webb, but the only work with that title was written by E. L. Bryson)
- Harry Collingwood (1843–1922), a writer of boys' adventure fiction, usually in a nautical setting.
- James Fenimore Cooper (1789–1851), who created a unique form of American literature with his historical fiction with frontier and Native American themes.
- E. E. Cowper (1859–1933), Edith Eliza Cowper, a prolific English author of juvenile fiction, much of which was published by the SPCK, who had eight children by Frank Cowper, yachtsman and author, from whom she separated shortly after the last of her children was born.
- Ridgwell Cullum (1867–1943), a pseudonym for Sidney Groves Burghard, a British writer of adventure fiction usually set in the wilds of the United States and Canada, unlike many other writers of cowboy stories he actually had been one.
- H. B. Davidson (1898–1998), Helene Beatrice Davidson, who wrote over two dozen books in the 1920s and 1930s, mostly about Girl Guides and Brownies, with a few featuring Boy Scouts.
- Daniel Defoe (c. 1659 – 1731), who wrote Robinson Crusoe and A Journal of the Plague Year among other works.
- Charles Deslys (1821–1885), a French writer who wrote historical fiction, some of which was translated into English.
- James Dixon (1882–1981), one of many pseudonyms used by Cecil Henry Bullivant, a UK editor, including of some British boys' magazines, author, and scriptwriter.
- George Manville Fenn (1831–1909), a prolific author of fiction for young adults.
- John Finbarr, who wrote adventure fiction for boys.
- F. B. Forester (1864–1946), real name Sarah Baird (Sally) Bennie, who wrote cowboy and other juvenile fiction much of if for the SPCK, and emigrated to New Zealand c. 1912, where she continued writing.
- Henry Frowde (1841–1927), publisher to University of Oxford who introduced juvenile literature and edited some books aimed at juveniles.
- Richard Le Gallienne (1866–1947), an English poet and author who write at least one work of juvenile fiction
- Charles Gilson (1878–1943), who wrote science fiction and historical fiction for children.
- Edward P. Gough (1877–1945), an Anglican cleric who published one book with the SPCK in 1923, and vicar of Tewkesbury Abbey in 1930.
- John Percy Groves (1850–1916), a soldier who wrote stirring stories for boys.
- Capt. J. E. Gurdon (1898–1973), a decorated World War I flying ace who wrote juvenile fiction in an effort to discharge his 1925 bankruptcy.
- Gunby Hadath (1880–1954), a school master and songwriter, and a prolific author of boys' school stories, and also of girls' school stories.
- Robert Harding (1897–1978), an English editor and prolific author of juvenile fiction who served in both World Wars and was an expert on military and police matters.
- J. C. Hardwick (1885–1953), John Charlton Hardwick, who wrote mainly on religious and historical topics.
- Herbert Hayens (1861–1944), who wrote juvenile fiction and school-books
- G. A. Henty (1832–1902), a prolific writer of boy's adventure fiction, often set in a historical context, who had himself served in the military and been a war correspondent.
- William Holt-White (1878–1937), an English novelist and biographer, who wrote at least seven Science fiction stories.
- Sydney Horler (1888–1954), who wrote thrillers which exhibited his many prejudices.
- John C. Hutcheson (1840–1897), a British writer about life at sea.
- Alfred Judd (1882–1932), Alfred John Judd was an English bookseller, who, having won a writing competition in Chums exchanged selling books for writing them, producing more than 30 works of juvenile fiction in the last twenty years of his life, mainly school stories, which were usually published first as serials.
- E. C. Kenyon (1854–1925), Edith Caroline Kenton, published more than 50 novels, mainly juvenile fiction, and mostly with the Religious Tract Society as well as translations, biographies, and tracts.
- W. H. G. Kingston (1814–1880), who wrote boy's adventure fiction.
- Charles and Mary Lamb (1775–1834), who wrote Tales From Shakespeare for children.
- Dr. Macaulay (1817–1902), James Macaulay, a Scottish doctor, journalist, and author, who edited a number of weekly periodicals wit0h moral and religious aims.
- Robert Maclauchlan Macdonald (1874–1942), a Scottish traveller, prospector, and a Fellow of the Royal Scottish Geographical Society who wrote juvenile fiction.
- Elizabeth Marc, who wrote adventure fiction set in remote places, typically the Arctic.
- John Strong Margerison (1887–1925), one of the pseudonyms of Joseph Margerison, an English writer who ran away to join the Royal Navy age fourteen, and became a prolific writer on nautical topics in both books and British boys' magazines when he was invalided out of the service in 1916.
- Frederick Marryat (1792–1848), a Royal Navy officer who wrote adventure books for children.
- William James Marx, who wrote juvenile fiction both as novels and as serial stories.
- B. W. Matz (1865–1925), Bertram Waldrom Matz, a Dickens scholar and the first editor of the Dickensian.
- W. H. McHaffie, a teacher who wrote about history.
- G. B. McKean (1888–1926), Captain George Burdon McKean, a Canadian soldier who won the Victoria Cross in World War I who wrote about his experience in the war.
- Dorothea Moore (1881–1993), an English actress, wartime nurse's aide, and the author of more than sixty works of juvenile fiction including both historical fiction and school stories.
- F. O. H. Nash (1887–1953), Frances Olivia Hartopp Nash who wrote girl's juvenile fiction, mostly guiding and school stories.
- E. Nesbit (1858–1924), an English poet and novelist who wrote The Railway Children among other works.
- Frederick Niven (1878–1944), a Canadian novelist of Scottish origin, he wrote over 30 novels, usually set in Scotland or Canada.
- D. H. Parry (1868–1950), David Harold Parry, who also wrote as Morton Pike and Captain Eilton Blacke, a prolific English writer of serial stories and other juvenile fiction, wrote for Chums from 1892 to 1935, from a family of painters and a painter himself, was an expert on the Napoleonic Wars.
- E. J. Rath (1885–1922), whose real name was Edith Rathbone Jacobs Brainerd, and was sometimes assisted by her husband Chauncey Corey Brainerd (1874–1922), an American who wrote serial stories, adventure novels and science fiction, had ten films based on her work.
- James Rice (1843–1882), an English historian of racing and a magazine editor, who wore a number of successful novels together with Walter Besant.
- Arthur T. Rich (1895–1967), Arthur Thomas Rich, an English Wesleyan Methodist minister who wrote several novels while assigned to Burntisland, Scotland.
- William Clark Russell (1844–1911), an English writer, best known for his novels in nautical settings.
- Godfrey Sellick, who wrote juvenile fiction for The Boy's Own Paper.
- Anna Sewell (1820–1878), an English novelist now best remembered for Black Beauty.
- Frank Hubert Shaw (1878–1960), a Royal Navy officer who saw service in World War One and a prolific author who wrote some seventy books and estimated 7,000 boys' magazine stories writing as Frank H. Shaw, Frank Cleveland, Archibald Guthrie, Grenville Hammerton, Frank Hubert, and Ernest Winchfield.
- W. P. Shervill (1877–1975), a British Post Official who wrote juvenile fiction.
- Lewis Spence (1874–1955), a Scottish editor, journalist, poet, author, folklorist, and student of the occult.
- Gordon Stables (1840–1910), a Scottish medical doctor in the Royal Navy who wrote boys' adventure fiction.
- R. L. Stevenson (1850–1894), the Scottish poet and novelist who wrote Treasure Island and other adventure fiction.
- Herbert Strang (1866–1958), a pair of writers producing adventure fiction for boys, both historical and modern-day.
- Samuel Walkey (1871–1953), a Cornish senior bank official who turned to writing boys stories to occupy him while travelling for work.
- Lucy L. Weedon (1862–1939), a prolific author of stories for small children and simplified accounts of stories from Dickens, the Bible etc.
- H. G. Wells (1866–1946), a prolific English writer, now best remembered for his science fiction.
- Eric Wood (1855–1940), F. Knowles Campling, an English editor of juvenile magazines, including Chums (1915–1918), and wrote both juvenile fiction and non-fiction.
- May Wynne (1875–1949), a prolific author of formulaic juvenile fiction, mostly animal and school stories who also wrote some adult historical fiction, with nearly 200 books in total.
- Charlotte Mary Yonge (1823–1901), who became a Sunday School teacher aged seven and remained one for the next seventy one years, she wrote to promote her religious views.

Webb also illustrated annuals, part books, and serials including for Chums, the Boy's Own Paper, Young England, and The Strand Magazine.

== Death ==
On 29 September 1939, when the 1939 register was taken, Webb was at home in Hackney without his wife. She was registered in Brookwood Hospital at Woking in Surrey. This must have been recent as she was still on the Register of Electors for 1939. Brookwood was a mental hospital, although part of the hospital was turned into a war hospital during the Second World War. Webb died at home of a heart attack on 23 January 1947, at 80 years of age. It is not clear when his wife died.
