= Edward Cadogan =

Edward Cadogan may refer to:

- Edward Cadogan (politician) (1880–1962), British politician
- Edward Cadogan (rower) (1833–1890), British clergyman and rower who won Silver Goblets at Henley Royal Regatta
- Edward Cadogan (cricketer) (1908–1993), English cricketer
