= Cadogan =

Cadogan (English: /kəˈdʌɡən/) is a name of Welsh or Irish origin and is a variant of the name Cadwgan (Welsh pronunciation: [kaˈduːɡan]). Cadogan is also an anglicisation of the Irish surname Ó Ceadagáin. It may refer to:

== People ==
- Cadogan (surname)
- Earl Cadogan, a peerage of Great Britain

== Places ==
- Cadogan, Alberta, Canada
- Cadogan Township, Armstrong County, Pennsylvania, United States

=== Chelsea, London ===
- Cadogan Hall
- Cadogan Place
- Cadogan Hotel, famous for the arrest of playwright Oscar Wilde
- Cadogan Square

== Other ==
- Cadogen West, a victim in the Sherlock Holmes story "The Adventure of the Bruce-Partington Plans" by Sir Arthur Conan Doyle
- Cadogan Estates, a property company
- Cadogan pot, a style of teapot produced by the Rockingham Pottery
- Cadogan Guides, a series of travel books
- Cadogan Chess, a publisher of chess books, now known as Everyman Chess
- Cadogan, Hong Kong, a private residential building in Kennedy Town, Hong Kong
