= William Cadogan =

William Cadogan may refer to:

- William Cadogan (politician) (1601–1661)
- William Cadogan, 1st Earl Cadogan (1675–1726)
- William Cadogan (childcare writer) (1711–1797), British physician and childcare writer
- William Bromley Cadogan (1751–1797), English priest
- William G. S. Cadogan (1879–1914), British Army officer
- William Cadogan, 7th Earl Cadogan (1914–1997)
