= Charles Bertie (1683–1727) =

English Tory politician

Charles Bertie (1683–1727) was an English Tory politician who sat for the borough of New Woodstock for a few years on a family interest.

He was the sixth son of Robert Bertie, 3rd Earl of Lindsey, and the eldest son by Lindsey's third wife, Lady Elizabeth Pope. In 1698, he was made a freeman of Appleby-in-Westmorland. In the 1705 election, he contested the borough of New Woodstock, Oxfordshire on the interest of his half-first cousin Lord Abingdon, then Lord Lieutenant of Oxfordshire. Like the rest of his family, he was a Tory, and he voted against the Court candidate for the Speakership, John Smith, in 1705.

At the 1705 election, the Duke of Marlborough, to whom the royal gift of Blenheim Palace had brought great influence in Woodstock, had arranged for the return of his trusted lieutenant, General William Cadogan, as the other member for the borough. By the 1708 election, Marlborough had replaced Abingdon as lord lieutenant of the county, and his influence was such that Bertie did not bother to contest the borough. Abingdon may have considered nominating him for Oxfordshire at the 1710 election, but ultimately chose Francis Clerke, whose nephew had married Bertie's first cousin Catherine. Under the Harley Ministry, Bertie attempted to obtain a captaincy in the foot guards, but was not successful.

On 29 April 1714, he married Mary (d. 1725), daughter of Thomas Browne of Addlethorpe and widow of Nicholas Newcomen of Theddlethorpe. After her death, on 13 February 1726, he married Mary, daughter of Rev. Henry Marshall. Neither marriage produced children. After his death on 15 August 1727, he was buried at Theddlethorpe, leaving his estate to Lord Albemarle Bertie, his half-great-nephew.

Parliament of England
Preceded by Hon. James Bertie; Sir William Glynne	Member of Parliament for New Woodstock; 1705–1707; With: William Cadogan	Succeeded by Parliament of Great Britain
Parliament of Great Britain
Preceded by Parliament of England	Member of Parliament for New Woodstock; 1707–1708; With: William Cadogan	Succeeded by William Cadogan; Sir Thomas Wheate
