= Sir William Glynne, 2nd Baronet =

Sir William Glynne, 2nd Baronet (17 May 1663 – 3 September 1721) was a Welsh lawyer and politician.

The elder son of Sir William Glynne, 1st Baronet (whom he succeeded in 1690), he was educated at St Edmund Hall, Oxford.

He was a Gentleman of the privy chamber from 1691 to 1702. He was Member of Parliament for Oxford University from 1698 until 1701 and then represented the borough of Woodstock from 1702 until 1705. He was awarded a D.C.L. from Oxford in 1706 and was appointed High Sheriff of Oxfordshire for 1706–7.

On 5 July 1688, Glynne married Mary Evelyn, daughter of Sir Edward Evelyn, 1st Baronet of Long Ditton. They had two children:

- William Glynne (1698–1719), a Fellow of All Souls College, Oxford
- Mary Glynne

Predeceased by his only son, he was succeeded on his death in 1721 by his brother Stephen.

Parliament of England
Preceded by Heneage Finch; Sir William Trumbull	Member of Parliament for Oxford University; 1698–1701; With: Sir Christopher Musgrave, Bt	Succeeded by Sir Christopher Musgrave, Bt; Heneage Finch
Preceded by Sir Thomas Littleton, Bt; James Bertie	Member of Parliament for Woodstock; 1702–1705; With: James Bertie	Succeeded by William Cadogan; Charles Bertie
Baronetage of England
Preceded by William Glynne	Baronet (of Bisseter, Oxfordshire); 1690–1721	Succeeded by Stephen Glynne
