= Henry Cadogan (disambiguation) =

Henry Cadogan (1642–1713/14) was an Anglo-Irish lawyer and father of the first Earl Cadogan.

Henry Cadogan may also refer to:

- Henry Cadogan, 4th Earl Cadogan (1812–1873), styled Viscount Chelsea between 1820 and 1864, British diplomat and politician
- Henry Cadogan, Viscount Chelsea (1868–1908), British politician
- Henry Cadogan (British Army officer) (1780–1813) who fell leading British troops at the Battle of Vittoria
