= William Carlile =

British politician

The Right Honourable Sir William Walter Carlile Bt OBE DL JP
- Carlile in 1895

Member of Parliament for Buckingham
- In office 13 July 1895 – 12 January 1906
- Preceded by: Sir Herbert Samuel Leon
- Succeeded by: Frederick William Verney

Personal details
- Born: William Walter Carlile; 15 June 1862
- Died: 3 January 1950 (aged 87)
- Party: Conservative
- Spouse(s): Blanche Ann Cadogan (1861–1939) then Elizabeth (nee Hawksfield)
- Parent(s): James William Carlile, Esq. of Ponsbourne Park, Herts.
- Education: Clare College, Cambridge
- Occupation: British Army officer and Conservative Party politician
- Profession: British Army officer, politician
- Website: website

Sir William Walter Carlile, 1st Baronet, OBE, DL, JP (15 June 1862 – 3 January 1950) was a British Conservative Party politician from Gayhurst in Buckinghamshire who served from 1895 to 1906 as the Member of Parliament (MP) for the Buckingham or (Northern) division of Buckinghamshire.

== Biography ==
Carlile was the only son of James William Carlile (1823-1909), a prosperous sewing thread manufacturer of Ponsbourne Park in Hertfordshire, and his wife Mary (née Whiteman) from Glengarr in Argyll. He was educated at Harrow and at Clare College, Cambridge, and later became a lieutenant of the 3rd Volunteer Battalion of the Oxfordshire Light Infantry (the former Royal Buckinghamshire Militia (King's Own).

He held several offices in the county: as a justice of the peace, a deputy lieutenant (having been appointed in 1897), and an Alderman of Buckinghamshire County Council. In early 1900 he received a commission as major of the 1st Battalion, Buckinghamshire Rifle Volunteers.

Carlile first stood for Parliament at the 1892 general election, when he was defeated in Buckingham by the sitting Liberal Party MP Herbert Samuel Leon. He won the seat at the next election, in 1895, on a swing of 4.5%, and was re-elected in 1900. He stood down from the House of Commons at the 1906 general election, when Buckingham was won by the Liberal Frederick William Verney.

== Honours ==
Having been appointed an Officer of the Order of the British Empire (OBE) in 1918, Carlile was made a baronet, of Gayhurst in the County of Buckingham, in the 1928 Birthday Honours. The baronetcy became extinct on his death.

== Personal ==
In 1885, Carlile married Blanche Anne Cadogan, daughter of the Rev. Edward Cadogan of Wicken, Northamptonshire, and sister of the author E. E. Cowper. After her death (1896?) he quickly remarried Elizabeth (nee Hawksfield).

His residence was listed in 1901 as Gayhurst House in Newport Pagnell, Buckinghamshire, a late-Elizabethan stone mansion house formerly owned by Everard Digby, one of the conspirators in the Gunpowder Plot of 1605. Set in well-wooded park of 250 acres (1.0 km^{2}), it has been described as "one of the most charming examples of Elizabethan architecture in the county".

Parliament of the United Kingdom
Preceded by Herbert Leon	Member of Parliament for Buckingham; 1895 – 1906	Succeeded by Frederick Verney
Baronetage of the United Kingdom
New creation	Baronet of Gayhurst, Buckinghamshire; 1928–1950	Extinct
