= William Cadogan (politician) =

Irish politician, and a cavalry major in Oliver Cromwell's army

Major William Cadogan
- Born: 1601; Dunster, Somerset
- Died: March 14, 1661 (aged 59–60); Dublin
- Occupation: politician
- Known for: cavalry major in Oliver Cromwell's army

Major William Cadogan (1601–1661), of Liscarton, County Meath, was born at Dunster, Somerset, to Henry Cadogan of Llanbetter, Pembrokeshire. His great-grandfather, Thomas Cadogan, of Dunster, claimed descent from the ancient princes of Wales (called Cadwgan). He was the father of the Dublin barrister Henry Cadogan and the grandfather of William Cadogan, 1st Earl Cadogan.

He served as MP for Monaghan Borough from 1639 to 1649 and was a cavalry major in Oliver Cromwell's army. In 1649, he ordered the destruction of Trim's old Augustinian abbey's belfry, known as the Yellow Steeple, as it had been used as a watch-tower by the Catholic rebels. As a reward for defending Trim Castle, County Meath, during the English Civil War and for putting down revolts around Dublin, he was given the governorship of Trim Castle. In 1658 he was appointed High Sheriff of Meath.

He died in Dublin on 14 March 1661. He had married Elizabeth Roberts and had a son Henry.
