= E. E. Cowper =

Journalist and author of Juvenile Fiction

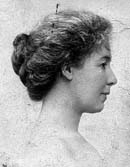
- Born: 21 July 1859; Stevenage, Hertfordshire, England
- Died: 18 November 1933 (aged 74); Milford on Sea, Hampshire, England
- Other names: Edith Eliza Cadogan, Edith Eliza Cooper, Edith Elise Cowper
- Occupation: Author
- Years active: 1879–1932
- Notable work: The House with Dragon Gates (1908); The Moonrakers (1910); Anne's Great Adventure (1923); White Wings to the Rescue (1924); The Girl of the North-West (1925); The Haunted Trail (1926); Camilla's Castle (1928)
- Spouse: Frank Cowper (m. 1877)
- Children: Frank Cadogan Cowper
- Parents: Edward Cadogan (father); Alice Smith (mother)

Edith Elise Cadogan Cowper (Note: Her name is subject to the following variations. Frank Cooper initially spelled his name Cooper, but changed it to Cowper by Deed Poll in 1885. Cadogan was baptised Edith Eliza, and still used this form of her second name at the time of her marriage, and for the 1911 census, but later came to be known as Edith Elise, and this was the form of her name at the time of her death.) (21 July 1859 – 18 November 1933) was a prolific and popular author of adventure stories for girls. She married yachtsman and fellow writer Frank Cowper and had eight children by him before the marriage fell apart.

== Early life ==
Cowper was born on 21 July 1859 at Stevenage, Hertfordshire. Her parents were the Reverend Edward Cadogan (1833 – 16 April 1890) and stockbroker's daughter Alice Smith (25 January 1833 – 24 March 1913). Cowper was the second of the couple's ten children. By the 1861 census her father was the Rector at Walton, Warwickshire, England, but moved to take up the Rectorship at Wickham in 1873, where he was to remain until his death in 1890.

Cowper married Frank Cooper (14 January 1849 – 28 May 1930) at her father's church in Wicken, Northamptonshire, England on 28 December 1877. She was seventeen at the time, and her husband was ten years older. He was a yachtsman, famous for single-handed cruising, and author, both of novels and of books on sailing. The couple had eight children, four boys and four girls: Frank Cadogan Cowper, Edith Alice Magdalen Cowper, Earnest Lionel Cadogen Cowper, Gerald Audrey Cadogan Cooper, Gladys Blanche Katherine Cowper, Gwenllyan Sybilla Mary Cowper, Henry Evelyn Cadogan Cowper, and Nesta Evelyn Dorothea Cowper. The first five children were registered as Cooper and had their names changed to Cowper when their father changed his name. The youngest three, being born after the name change in 1885, were registered with the surname Cowper.

Some sources suggest that Cowper had ten children, with two of them, Lois and Edward, dying in infancy, in addition to Henry. However, there is no record of such births in the birth index of the Government Record Office, and Cowpers's own account of the number of children she has had in the 1911 census, with eight children born and six surviving, suggests that there were no such births.

The couple lived first in Hordle, Hampshire, where they ran a small preparatory school. Later, they built Lisle Court at Wootton in the Isle of Wight, which also served as a school. The 1891 census shows Cowper living at Lisle Court with six of her children, Gerald, age 9 at the time is absent for some reason. The census shows that the house was no longer working as a school.

The marriage was not a happy one. The summary of Frank Cadogan Cowper's letters to his mother in the Royal Academy Collections states that Cowper divorced her on the grounds of violence and infidelity, but Sims and Clare says that while the marriage broke up, they may never have divorced. Cowper still describes herself as married in the 1911 census.

By 1901, Cowper was living in Acton in London with her four daughters, aged 12 to 21 and with her profession listed as authoress. The 1911 census found Cowper living with her daughter Nesta at Flat 7, Fairlawn Court, Acton Lane, Chiswick, London. Her other three daughters had already married, and Nesta would do so in 1914.

Cowper was living at Milford on Sea, Hampshire when she died on 18 November 1933. Her estate was valued at £977 6s.7d.

== Writing ==
The Evening Post (New Zealand) says that Cowper published her first, book, set in the New Forest before she was 20. However, the first book recorded in the Jisc Library Hub Discover database (Note: The Jisc Library Hub Discover brings together the catalogues of 165 Major UK and Irish libraries.) Additional libraries are being added all the time, and the catalogue collates national, university, and research libraries. is Hide and Seek, published in 1881. She followed this with Hasselaers in 1883. It is note clear who published the first book, but the second was published by the Society for Promoting Christian Knowledge (SPCK). The SPCK published all but three of her books until 1915, after which she began to use other publishers. She first published with Blackie & Son in 1917, and Blackie would publish nearly half of her output from then on.

Cowper wrote adventures stories for teenage girls. Many of the feature sailing. (Note: Her estranged husband Frank Cowper was a noted yachtsman, and was a leader in the field of single-handed cruising.) The wilds of Canada, where one of her sons had settled before the First World War, feature in many of here stories, whether searching for gold, or trapping. Smuggling is another repeated trope, even featuring in her school story Fifth Form Adventurers.

== Assessment ==
Cowper was writing for what Alice Corkran called the Modern Girl in her Chat with the Girl of the Period in The Girl's Realm.

Kate Flint said that while researching for the Woman Reader, she was hardly surprised to find how many girls in the nineteenth century openly preferred their brothers' books, with the active role models that they offered. Cowper offered here girl readers active role models. The Yorkshire Post when speaking of Cowper and similar girls' authors, said that Girls need no longer impound their brothers’ books for such stories fortunately they can now see themselves as the protagonists in these romances. and that Cowper can always be relied on for action.

== Works ==
The following bibliography is based on a search on the Jisc Library Hub Discover database for books authored by Cowper. In all, there are 69 books listed in the table, (Note: The matches the number given by Sims and Clare.) as two of the items are derivatives. Cowper contributed to a number of anthologies and annuals but these are not included here, nor in any reissues of her work. She also wrote some short fiction for magazines, but again, there are not listed here.

Books by Cowper
Ser	Year	Title	Illustrator	Place	Publisher	Pages	Notes
1	1881	Hide and seek		London		8º	
2	1883	The Hasselaers		London	SPCK	156 p., 4 p., 3. ill., 8º	(Note: Subtitled A tale of courage and endurance. Almost no details on Jisc, details instead from second-hand books page.)
3	1899	The Misadventures of I.M.P. A story for little girls		London	SPCK	80 p., 8º	
4	1899	Theckla Jansen. The story of a lonely girl		London	SPCK	80 p., 8º	
5	1900	Bessie	Walter Sidney Stacey (Note: William Sydney Stacey (Sidney on his baptismal record) (30 June 1846 – 15 September 1929) was a prolific painter and illustrator who illustrated over 300 children's books, mostly for boy's adventure books. Stacey illustrated six of Cowper's books, matching the number illustrated by Gordon Browne.)	London	SPCK	224 p., 8º	
6	1900	Red, White, and Blue; or Dick's enemy		London	SPCK	94 p., 8º	
7	1901	The brown bird and her owners, a story of adventure off the South Coast	Walter Sidney Stacey	London	SPCK	256 p., 8º	
8	1903	Calder Creek, a story of smuggling on the South Coast	Walter Sidney Stacey	London	SPCK	246 p., ill., 8º	
9	1904	'Viva Christina!' The adventures of a young Scot with the British legion	W. H. C. Groome (Note: William Henry Charles Groome (17 November 1884 – 14 October 1913) was a prolific illustrator of children's books and a skilled watercolourist who appears to have been self-taught.)	London	Chambers	292 p., 6 ill., 8º	
10	1904	The Witches of Westover Combe, a story of the South Coast, etc.	Harold Piffard	London	SPCK	221 p., 8º	
11	1905	The Haunted Mill on Birley River: the story of a South Coast creek	Harold Piffard	London	SPCK	254 p., 8º	
12	1906	The disappearance of David Pendarve	Harold Piffard	London	SPCK	254 p., ill., 8º	
13	1907	The invaders of Fairford	Adolf Thiede	London	SPCK	253 p., col. fs., 8º	(Note: Sheldon Press was an imprint of the SPCK.)
14	1908	The House with Dragon Gates, a story of old Chiswick in 1745	Harold Piffard	London	SPCK	245 p., 8º	
15	1909	Lady Fabia, a story of adventure on the South Coast in 1805, etc.	Adolf Thiede	London	SPCK	221 p., 8º	
16	1910	Andrew Garnett's Will, etc.	Thomas Heath Robinson (Note: Thomas Heath Robinson (19 June 1869 – 13 September 1944) was a talented and versatile painter, illustrator and etcher who was overshadowed by his more famous younger brothers Charles and William Heath Robinson.)	London	SPCK	223 p., 8º	
17	1910	The moonrakers, a story of smugglers in the New Forest in 1747	Walter Sidney Stacey	London	SPCK	256 p., 2 ill., 8º	
18	1910	Three girls on a yacht	Edward Smith Hodgson (Note: Edward Smith Hodgson (25 April 1866 – April 1923) was a well-known Scottish artist who became better knows as an issustrator of boy's adventure books.)	London	Cassell	vi, 343 p., 8 ill., 8º	
19	1911	The Captain of the Waterguard	Adolf Thiede	London	SPCK	252 p., 8º	
20	1911	The island of rushes: the strange story of a holiday mystery	Walter Sidney Stacey	London	SPCK	251 p., 8º	
21	1913	Enter Patricia, being an account of her strange adventures on a visit to the Cornish coast	Noël Harrold	London	Cassell	304 p., 4 ill., 8º	
22	1913	Leo Lousada, Gentleman Adventurer	Adolf Thiede	London	SPCK	256 p., 8º	
23	1913	The Strange Story of Kittiwake's Castle	Gordon Browne	London	SPCK	120 p., 8º	
24	1913	Two Girls and a Secret	Walter Sidney Stacey	London	SPCK	254 p., 4 pl., 8º	
25	1914	The crew of the "Silver Fish"	Walter Paget	London	SPCK	VI, 223p, 8º	
26	1915	The King's Double, etc.	Archibald Webb	London	SPCK	254 p., 8º	
27	1915	The Mystery of Castle Veor; or, the Spies in our midst	Archibald Webb	London	SPCK	vi, 222 p., 3 ill. (1 col.), 8º	
28	1915	The strange girl from the sea	Noël Harrold	London	Cassell	vii, 312 p., 4 ill., 8º	(Note: Cassell's Empire library.)
29	1916	Three Sailor Girls	N. Tenison	London	Henry Frowde	288 p., 4pl., 8º	
30	1916	The valley of dreams	Norah Schlegel (Note: Nora Schlegel (18 January 1879 – 15 November 1963) was a magazine illustrator, particularly for the Windsor Magazine who also illustrated books and book covers. Most of her illustrations seem to be in half-tone. The Artist did a piece on her in December 1938)	London	Cassell	279 p., 4 ill., 8º	
31	1917	Hill of Broom. A Guernsey mystery	Elizabeth Earnshaw	London	Cassell	312 p., 4 ill., 8º	
32	1917	Jane in Command. The story of a girl's war work and its strange results	Gordon Browne	London	Blackie & Son	284 p., 8º	
33	1919	The black dog's rider	John W. Campbell (Note: John William Campbell (1886 – 4 May 1935) was a magazine and book illustrator who illustrated some 25 children's books, mostly girls' school stories.)	London	SPCK	v, 322 p., 8º	
34	1919	Maids of the “Mermaid.” A story of adventure on the coast of England	C. Dudley Tennant (Note: Charles Dudley Tennant (1866–1952), active 1898 – 1918. Painter and Illustrator in black and white, full colour, and half-tone. The sculptor Trevor Tenant (2 July 1900 – last quarter 1980) was his son.)	London	Blackie & Son	288 p., 8º	
35	1920	Corporal Ida's floating camp	C. E. Brock	London	SPCK	123 p., 8º	
36	1920	Pam and the Countess	Gordon Browne	London	Blackie & Son	287 p., 6 ill., 8º	(Note: Available as an E-book on Project Gutenberg.)
37	1921	Celia wins	Rosa Petherick	London	Collins	320 p., 8º	
38	1921	The mystery of Saffron Manor	Gordon Browne	London	Blackie & Son	284 p., 6 ill., 8º	
39	1921	Wild Rose to the Rescue	C. E. Brock	London	SPCK	154 p. 6 pl, 8º	
40	1922	The Brushwood Hut	Gordon Browne	London	Blackie & Son	207 p., 8º	
41	1922	The island of secrets	Gordon Browne	London	Blackie & Son	207 p., 4 ill., 8º	(Note: Dramatised as a 45 minute radio play by Olive Dehn for The Children's Hour in 1936.)
42	1922	Two on the Trail. A story of Canada snows, etc.	Walter Paget	London	Sheldon Press	160 p., 8º	
43	1923	Ann's Great Adventure	John Dewar Mills (Note: John (Jock) Dewar Mills (8 November 1883 – 24 June 1966) was a book illustrator who worked mainly on books for girls, ecpecially school stories.)	London	Blackie & Son	320 p., 8º	(Note: A 98 page abridged edition was published in 1935 as Anna Goes Sailing, a Blackie Graded Story Reader.)
44	1924	Girls on the Gold Trail. A story of strange adventures in the northlands		London	Nelson	327 p., 8º	
45	1924	The mystery term	R. H. Brock	London	Blackie & Son	255 p., 6 ill., 8º	(Note: Listed as a school story by Sims and Clare)
46	1924	White Wings to the Rescue	C. R. Fleming-Williams (Note: Clifford Roger Flemming Williams (11 April 1880 – 27 December 1940)) was a black and white artist and watercolourist. He contributed to several magazines, as well as to a small number of books.)	London	Blackie & Son	320 p., 8º	
47	1925	The girl from the North-West	Henry Coller	London	Blackie & Son	319 p., 6 ill., 8º	
48	1925	Hunted, and the Hunter	Stanley L. Wood	London	Sheldon Press	iii, 122 p., fs., 8º	
49	1925	Witch of the wilds, a story of adventure in the northern snows		London	Nelson	312 p., fs., 8º	
50	1926	The Haunted Trail	Henry Coller	London	Blackie & Son	224 p., 8º	
51	1926	That Troublesome Term	Elizabeth Earnshaw	London	Cassell	215 p., 4 ill., 8º	(Note: Part of Cassell's new girls' library.)
52	1927	Cross Winds Farm; or, the Adventure of the silver foxes		London	Chambers	154 p., 8º	
53	1927	Hit the Trail. A wild west story	Archibald Stevenson Forrest	London	Nelson	335 p., 8º	
54	1927	The Holiday School	Norman Sutcliffe	London	Cassell	215 p., 4 ill. (2 col.), 8º	
55	1927	Nancy's Fox Farm	Norman Sutcliffe	London	Blackie & Son	256 p., 8º	
56	1928	Camilla's Castle	Roger Oak	London	Blackie & Son	255 p., 8º	
57	1928	Peterina on the rescue trail	R. H. Brock	London	Nelson	320 p., 1 col. ill., 8°	
58	1929	The fifth form adventurers		London	Cassell	215 p., ill., 8º	
59	1929	The Forbidden Island	Francis Ernest Hiley (Note: Francis Ernest Hiley (12 February 1878 – 20 December 1965) was an illustrator who worked on magazines as well as on children's books.)	London	Blackie & Son	208 p., 8º	
60	1929	Gill and the Beanstalk		London	Blackie & Son	191 p., 8º	
61	1929	That Joyous Adventure		London	Nelson	95 p., 8º	(Note: Captain Series.)
62	1929	The Wolf Runner	William Bryce Hamilton (Note: William Bryce Hamilton (Brice on baptismal record) (28 October 1894 – 26 May 1955) illustrated only about 30 children's books. He was more famous for his work illustrating Sexton Blake and his earlier work for The Sphere.)	London	Nelson	318 p., 8º	
63	1930	The Crow's Nest, etc.		London	Sheldon Press	153 p., 8º	
64	1930	The Invincible Fifth	Percy Bell Hickling (Note: Percy Bell Hickling (22 September 1976 – 10 June 1951 was an illustrator with a large magazine output, as well as illustrating children's books, especially girls' school stories.)	London	Cassell	215 p., 4 ill., 8º	
65	1930	Rosamond takes the Lead	Hugh Radcliffe-Wilson	London	Blackie & Son	223 p., 8º	(Note: Reissued in 1954 in a 168 page abridged edition, edited and adapted for school reading as No.5 in the Girls' section of Blackie's Life and Adventure Series.)
66	1931	Girls on the Trap-Line	A. Leo Knopf	London	Nelson	292 p., 8º	
67	1932	The Lodge in the Wood, etc.		London	Sheldon Press	125 p., 8º	
68	1933	Elsie and the Grey Thief		London	Blackie & Son	64 p., 8º	(Note: Blackie's Graded Story Readers.)
69	1933	The Girls of Mystery Gorge	R. H. Brock	London	Nelson	295 p., 8º	
