= Cadwgan =

Cadwgan [kaˈduːɡan] or Cadwgawn is a Welsh given name, meaning "battle glory" (from cad "battle" and gwogawn "glory"). The name occurs in the Mabinogion as the son of Iddon. Cadogan is the anglicised form of Cadwgan.

Bearers of the name include:

- Cadwgan ap Bleddyn (1051–1111)
- Cadwgan ap Meurig (c. 1045 – 1074)
- Cadwgan of Llandyfai (died 1241)
- Cadwgan ap Cadwaladr ap Gruffydd (c. 1110 – 1172)

== See also ==
Cadogan
