= Frank Cowper =

British writer and journalist (1849–1930)

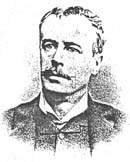
- Born: 18 January 1849; London, England
- Died: 28 May 1930 (aged 81); St Cross, Winchester, Hampshire, England
- Education: Aldenham; Brentwood; Blackheath Proprietary School; The Queen's College, Oxford
- Occupations: Yachtsman; writer; illustrator; journalist; novelist; historian
- Spouse: E. E. Cowper
- Children: 10, including Frank Cadogan Cowper
- Writing career
- Period: 1870–1930
- Genres: Travelogue, novel, non-fiction
- Notable works: Sailing Tours series The Captain of the Wight; Xmas Eve on a Haunted Hulk

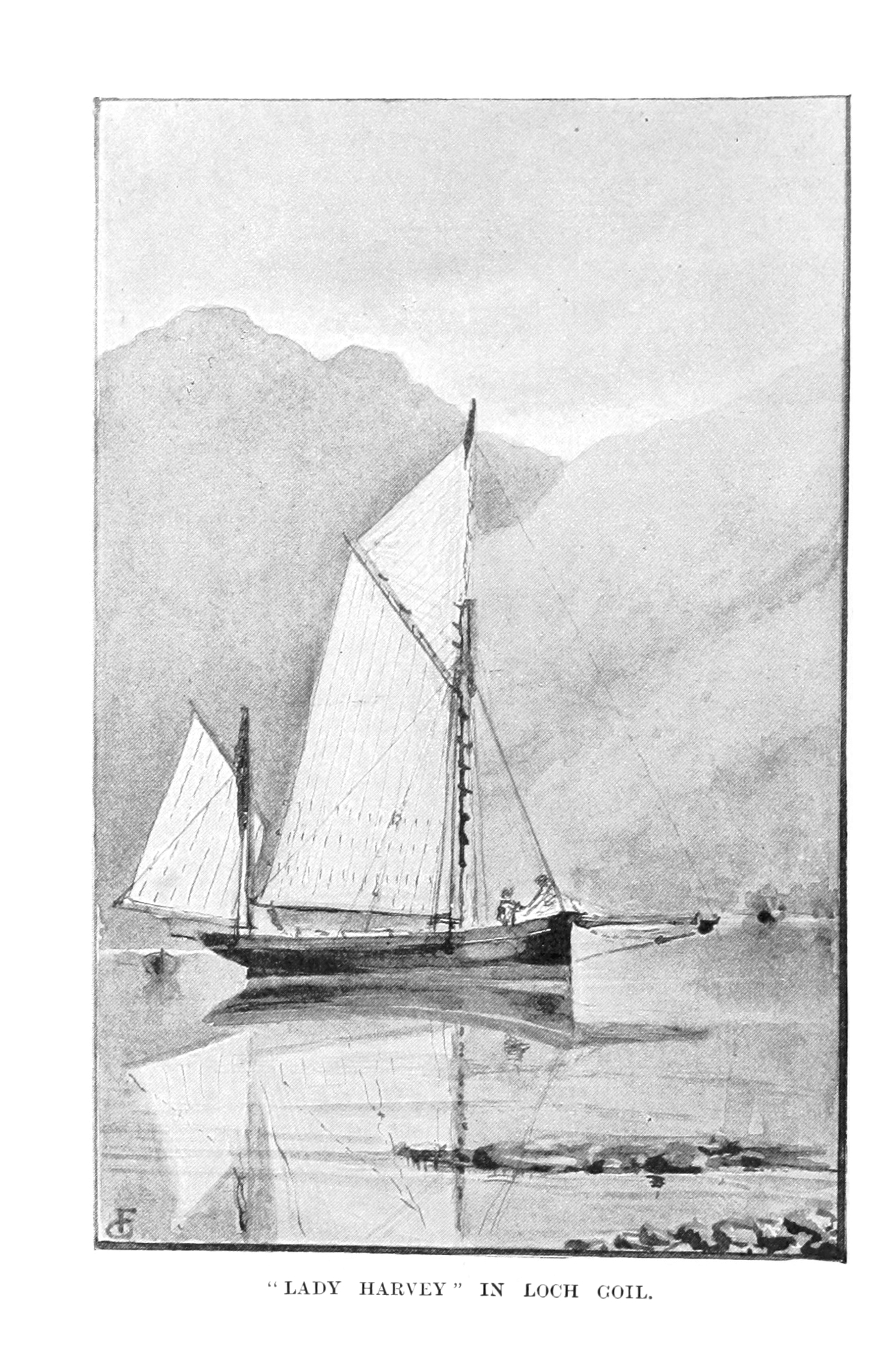
Lady Harvey on Loch Goil. An illustration of Cowper's yacht, by the author, from his book Jack-All-Alone.

Frank Cowper (18 January 1849 – 28 May 1930) was an English single-handed yachtsman, explorer, author, illustrator, artist, and journalist who was influential in popularizing single-handed cruising. He has been credited as "the forefather of modern cruising", following the publication of his five books, Sailing Tours, describing his circumnavigation of the British Isles, the East coast of Ireland, and the French coast of Brittany in a converted 29-ton, 48-foot Dover Fishing boat named Lady Harvey. In a review of the last of his sailing books published in the year of his passing, recognition of his achievements during and after his eventful life are summarized with the following accolades. His books "laid the foundation" of the pilot guides used by yachtsmen today.

== Early life ==
He was initially Frank Cooper but assumed the spelling of Cowper by deed-poll in 1885, and was the second son of five children to Henry Cooper of London. He studied classical history at The Queen's College, Oxford, where he matriculated in 1867, graduating B.A. in 1871 and M.A. in 1875.

== Yachting ==
Cowper learned to sail on the Upper Thames, hiring catboats with friends when he was an undergraduate at Oxford. In 1870, in his final year at university, he spent his summer vacation in Auray, Brittany in northern France, sailing a small dinghy in the Gulf of Morbihan and out into Quiberon Bay.

Between 1892 and 1895, Cowper circumnavigated the British Isles, exploring practically every river and creek along the coast. He also crossed the English Channel to France and Belgium.

Cowper's most well-known work, Sailing Tours, describes these voyages and was published in five volumes between 1892 and 1896. Original copies are now quite collectable, and a full set can fetch as much as £500. In 1985, Ashford Press published a facsimile reprint of all five volumes.

Cowper originally undertook the voyages documented in Sailing Tours, mostly single-handed, in the yawl Lady Harvey, a 44 foot (13 m) Dover fishing lugger built in 1867. In his 1921 book Single-Handed Cruising, Francis B. Cooke claimed that no amateur yachtsman had ever single-handed a larger vessel. Cowper sold Lady Harvey in 1895, then building a ketch of his own design, Undine II, which became his favourite but which he sold in 1899. He next owned a yawl named Zayda, followed by a French fishing lugger, Idéal, and a 14-ton cutter Little Windflower. In 1921, Cowper purchased the 41 foot (12 m) cutter Ailsa, which was to be the last boat he owned.

Sailing Tours continued to be cited in sailing guides, with Neville Featherstone describing Cowper's writing as "a rich blend of navigational facts laced with his own semi-libellous observations on the world around him". Alan Titchmarsh described it as a "rich source of inspiration" for his 1999 novel, The Last Lighthouse Keeper.

== Fiction ==
Cowper also wrote several adventure and romance novels. One of these, The Island of the English (1898), was described as having "a strong, compelling note of verity" and "a vivid, flexible style".

== Family ==
On 28 December 1876, Cowper married fellow author Edith Elise Cadogan, daughter of the Rector of Wicken. They made their home on the Isle of Wight and Edith bore eight children; one did not survive infancy but their eldest son, Frank Cadogan Cowper, grew up to become a recognised Pre-Raphaelite artist. The marriage broke down — and they separated in 1890. His brother, Colonel Harry Cooper CMG CBE, became ADC to Queen Victoria from 1898 to 1901 and to King Edward Vll from 1901 to 1904.

== Books ==
=== Sailing ===
- Sailing Tours Part 1 - The Coasts of Essex and Suffolk (1892)
- Sailing Tours Part 2 - The Nore to the Scilly Isles (1893)
- Sailing Tours Part 3 - Falmouth to the Loire (1894)
- Sailing Tours Part 4 - Lands End to the Mull of Galloway including the East Coast of Ireland (1895)
- Sailing Tours Part 5 - The Clyde to the Thames Round North (1896)
- Jack-All-Alone, His Cruises (1897)
- Yachting and Cruising for Amateurs (1911)
- Cruising Sails and Yachting Tales (1921)
- Vagaries of Lady Harvey - The Meanderings of a Freak among the Orkneys (1930)

=== Fiction ===
- Caedwalla - The Saxons in the Isle of Wight (1888)
- The Captain of the Wight - A Romance of Carisbrooke Castle in 1488 (1889)
- The Hunting of the Auk (1895)
- The Island of the English - A Story of Napoleon's Days (1898)
- The Forgotten Door (1900)

=== Short fiction ===
- "Christmas Eve on a Haunted Hulk" (1889)

=== Nonfiction ===
- Ye Lay of ye Lady Harvey and ye Little Blue Dragon - Private publication of 50 Copies (1908)

== Boats ==
- Aristide Marie
- Undine I
- Lady Harvey
- Undine II
- Zayda
- Anonyma
- Guardian Angel
- Ruby
- Ideal
- Little Windflower
- Ailsa
