= George Cadogan (disambiguation) =

George Cadogan (1814–1880) was a British Army general.

George Cadogan may also refer to:

- George Cadogan, 3rd Earl Cadogan (1783–1864), British Royal Navy officer and politician
- George Cadogan, 5th Earl Cadogan (1840–1915), British politician
