= Liscartan =

Townland and civil parish in County Meath, Ireland

Coordinates: 53°40′N 6°43′W

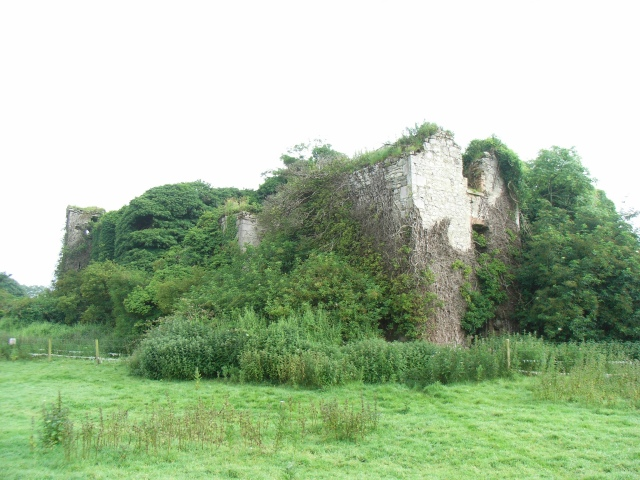
Liscartan Castle, described as "a pair of conjoined towerhouses of the 15th century" (15 July 2007)

Liscartan (Irish: Lios Cartáin, meaning 'Cartan's fort'), or Liscarton, is a townland and civil parish in County Meath, Ireland. It is about 3 miles (5 km) northwest of Navan, on the river Blackwater, and on the former mail road from Dublin to Enniskillen (now the R147 road).

== History ==
The name Liscartan has been translated as "Cartan's fort", which likely indicates it was a defensive site from the 12th century. Some of the earliest references to Liscartan suggest that the lands were part of lands granted to the original Abbey in Navan by the O'Rourkes of Breffni. After the Norman Conquest, the lands were included in the grant of the Barony of Navan made to the knight Jocelyn de Angulo by Hugh de Lacy, Lord of Meath.

A mid-17th-century civil survey shows that Sir Robert Talbot of Carton (brother of the 1st Earl of Tyrconnell, the Lord Lieutenant under King James II) and the Irish Papist Adam Missett of Bellewstown owned lands at Liscarton. The last recorded owner of Liscartan Castle was Sir Richard Talbot, Bt., in 1633.

In the 18th century, Liscarton was the birthplace of the 1st Earl Cadogan as his father, Henry Cadogan, the High Sheriff of Meath, owned the property by 1703. Lord Cadogan was an army officer whose active military service began during the Williamite War in Ireland in 1689 and ended with the suppression of the 1715 Jacobite Rebellion. A close associate and confidant of the 1st Duke of Marlborough, he was also a diplomat and Whig politician who sat in the English and British House of Commons from 1705 until 1716, when he was raised to the peerage. Lord Cadogan succeeded Marlborough in 1722 as Master-General of the Ordnance and senior army commander.

Reportedly, the prosperous Anglo-Irish Gerrard family of Gibbstown occupied Liscarton for much of the 18th century and the first half of the 19th century. Thomas Gerrard operated a substantial flour mill nearby. A deed from 1841 records "a dwelling house, corn mills, kilns, water courses and stores". The lease was made between Thomas Gerrard and William Gerrard and James Cullen, Michael Cullen and Thomas Cullen. The Cullens, all from the village of Narraghmore in the south of County Kildare, were the brothers of the then Paul Monsignor Cullen (1803-1878), the then Rector of the Irish College in Rome. Monsignor Cullen later became His Eminence Paul Cardinal Cullen, being appointed Archbishop of Armagh in 1850 and Archbishop of Dublin in 1852; he became the first Irish-born person to be created a cardinal, in 1866. Cardinal Cullen addressed several letters from Liscarton Castle. "The Cullens operated the mill as a profitable enterprise for the rest of the 19th century."

In 1834, there were 14 Protestants and 222 Catholics in Liscarton. In 1842, the Lewis Topographical Directory listed "Bachelor's Lodge" as the residence of John Wade, Esq., in this parish. According to Slater's Directory in 1894, Liscartan consisted of 1,303 acres and the population in 1891 was 144 and Liscartan Castle, a modernised ancient building, was the seat of Hugh J. Cullen, Esq., J.P.

=== Liscartan Castle ===
Liscarton Castle is a 15th-century castellated building that originally consisted of 2 towers connected by a large hall. Around 1800, one of the towers was shortened and converted into living accommodations. The remaining tower is 4 stories high featuring multiple carved heads in the stonework.

In the 15th century, Jane Taafe was recorded as having inherited lands at Liscarton. In 1403, Taafe sought permission to take scrub from Barfotstown to produce lime for the construction of a castle at Liscarton. According to George Victor Du Noyer, Taafe's husband built the manorial church the following year, which according to Sir William Wilde: ""the church is remarkable for the extreme beauty of its eastern and western windows, each of which consists of one great light.... an exquisite variety of tracery, in the decorated style of gothic architecture, fills the head of both windows, and the mouldings are deep and well executed. Upon the exterior face may be observed well carved human heads projecting from the dripstone." Following Taafe's death, the castle passed to Nicholas Rowe (Jane's son from her first marriage to Peter Rowe).

== See also ==
- Sir Robert Talbot, 2nd Baronet
- Henry Cadogan
- William Cadogan, 1st Earl Cadogan
- Paul Cullen
