= Charles Cadogan =

Charles Cadogan may refer to:

- Charles Cadogan, 2nd Baron Cadogan (1685–1776), British peer and Member of Parliament for Reading
- Charles Cadogan, 1st Earl Cadogan (1728–1807), British peer and Whig politician
- Charles Cadogan, 2nd Earl Cadogan (1749–1832), British nobleman, styled Viscount Chelsea from 1800 to 1807
- Charles Cadogan, 8th Earl Cadogan (born 1937), British peer, landowner and philanthropist
