= Henry Cadogan =

Irish barrister

High Sheriff of Meath
- In office 1700–1702
- Preceded by: Joseph Pratt
- Succeeded by: James Naper of Loughcrew

Personal details
- Born: 1642 Ireland
- Died: 13 January 1713/14 Dublin, Ireland
- Spouse: Bridget Waller (after 1671)
- Relations: Sarah Lennox, Duchess of Richmond (granddaughter); Charles Cadogan, 1st Earl Cadogan (grandson); Sir Thomas Prendergast, 2nd Baronet (grandson)
- Children: 5, including William, Charles
- Parent(s): William Cadogan; Elizabeth Roberts
- Education: Trinity College, Dublin

Henry Cadogan (1642 – 13 January 1713/14) of Liscartan, County Meath was an Irish barrister.

== Early life ==
Cadogan was the son of Maj. William Cadogan and Elizabeth Roberts. His father was born at Dunster, Somerset to an old Pembrokeshire family. He served with Oliver Cromwell in Ireland, and was rewarded for his services with the estate of Liscarton, where Henry grew up. Henry also acquired lands in County Limerick.

His paternal grandfather was Henry Cadogan of Llanbetter, a grandson of Thomas Cadogan, of Dunster, who claimed descent from the ancient princes of Wales (called Cadwgan ap Elystan Glodrydd "The Renowned", Prince of Fferreg, of Dol-y-Gaer, Breconshire).

== Career ==
Educated at Trinity College, Dublin, he was a barrister and also High Sheriff of Meath in 1700. Unlike his eldest son William, he did not play a leading part in public life.

== Personal life ==
On about 31 July 1671, he married Bridget Waller, the second daughter of the regicide Sir Hardress Waller and Elizabeth Dowdall, by whom he had five children:

- William Cadogan, 1st Earl Cadogan (1672–1726), (Note: William Cadogan, 1st Earl Cadogan was a noted soldier, politician and diplomat. He was a general in the army and fought in the War of the Spanish Succession and also served as Ambassador to the Netherlands and as Master-General of the Ordnance. In 1716, he was raised to the Peerage of Great Britain as Baron Cadogan, of Reading in the County of Berkshire, with normal remainder to the heirs male of his body. In 1718, he was further honoured when he was made Baron Cadogan, of Oakley in the County of Buckingham, with remainder, failing heirs male of his own, to his younger brother Charles Cadogan and the heirs male of his body, and Viscount Caversham, in the County of Oxford, and Earl Cadogan, in the County of Denbigh, with remainder to the heirs male of his body. These titles were also in the Peerage of Great Britain.) who married Dutch heiress Margaretta Munter in 1704.
- Ambrose Cadogan (d. 1693), who died unmarried.
- Charles Cadogan, 2nd Baron Cadogan (1685–1776), who married Elizabeth Sloane, a daughter of the Irish-born physician and landowner Sir Hans Sloane.
- Frances Cadogan, who died aged 9.
- Penelope Cadogan (d. 1746), who married Sir Thomas Prendergast, 1st Baronet.

Cadogan on 13 January 1714/15 at Dublin.

=== Descendants ===
Through his eldest son William, he had two granddaughters: Lady Sarah Cadogan (b. 1705), who married Charles Lennox, 2nd Duke of Richmond; (Note: Sarah Lennox, Duchess of Richmond had twenty-three pregnancies, from which twelve children were born, including: Lady Georgiana Carolina Lennox (who married Henry Fox, 1st Baron Holland); Lady Emilia Mary Lennox (wife of James FitzGerald, 1st Duke of Leinster and, secondly, William Ogilvie); Charles Lennox, 3rd Duke of Richmond; Lord George Lennox; Lady Louisa Augusta Lennox (wife of Thomas Connolly); and Lady Sarah Lennox (wife of Sir Charles Bunbury, 6th Baronet and, secondly, George Napier).) and Margaret Cadogan (b. 1707), who married the Hon. Charles John Bentinck (fourth son of William Bentinck, 1st Earl of Portland).
