= Edward Cadogan (cricketer) =

English cricketer and soldier

Edward Cadogan CBE
Personal information
- Full name: Edward Henry Cadogan
- Born: 11 September 1908; Kasauli, Punjab, British India
- Died: 7 February 1993 (aged 84); Lymington, Hampshire, England
- Batting: Right-handed
- Bowling: Right-arm fast

Domestic team information
- Years: Team
- 1929: Europeans
- 1933–1935: Hampshire

Career statistics
Competition	First-class
Matches	9
Runs scored	148
Batting average	14.80
100s/50s	0/0
Top score	36*
Balls bowled	1,254
Wickets	29
Bowling average	22.48
5 wickets in innings	1
10 wickets in match	0
Best bowling	5/52
Catches/stumpings	4/–
- Source: ESPNcricinfo, 14 February 2010
- Military career
- Allegiance: United Kingdom
- Branch: British Army
- Service years: 1928-1960
- Rank: Colonel
- Unit: Royal Welch Fusiliers
- Conflicts: World War II; Normandy Campaign
- Education: Winchester College; Royal Military College, Sandhurst
- Spouse: Lady Mary Veronica Lambart (m. 1934; died 1989)
- Father: Henry Osbert Samuel Cadogan
- Relatives: Edward Cadogan (grandfather); Horace Lambart (father-in-law)

Edward Henry Cadogan CBE (11 September 1908 – 7 February 1993) was an English first-class cricketer and British Army officer.

The son of Lieutenant Colonel Henry Osbert Samuel Cadogan, he was born in British India at Kasauli. He was educated in England at Winchester College, before attending the Royal Military College, Sandhurst. He graduated from there into the Royal Welch Fusiliers as a second lieutenant in August 1928. Whilst serving in British India, Cadogan made his debut in first-class cricket for the Europeans cricket team against the Parsees at Bombay in the 1929–30 Bombay Quadrangular. This was his only first-class appearance whilst serving in India.

Cadogan was promoted to lieutenant in August 1931. Having returned to England from his service in India, Cadogan featured in inter-services matches for the British Army cricket team in 1931. In 1933, he was selected to play for Hampshire, debuting in the County Championship against Derbyshire at Portsmouth. He played first-class cricket for Hampshire until 1935, making five appearances for the county. In addition to playing at first-class level for the Europeans and Hampshire, Cadogan also played first-class cricket for the British Army, making four appearances between 1933 and 1936, including one appearance against the touring West Indians. In first-class cricket, Cadogan had most success as a right-arm fast bowler, taking 29 wickets at an average of 22.48. He took one five wicket haul, with figures of 5 for 52 for Hampshire against Middlesex in 1934.

In the army, he was promoted to captain in August 1938, having been seconded for service with the Colonial Office in February 1937. Cadogan served in the Second World War with the Royal Welch Fusiliers, during which he was wounded in action in the Normandy campaign. Following the war, he was promoted to lieutenant colonel in January 1949, and was promoted to colonel in January 1955. Cadogan was made a CBE in January 1957, prior to retiring from active service in April 1960. He died at Lymington on 7 February 1993. He had married Lady Mary Veronica Lambart (daughter of Horace Lambart, 11th Earl of Cavan) in April 1934, with the young 3rd Baron Montagu of Beaulieu acting as her page; she predeceased Cadogan by four years. His grandfather was the noted rower Edward Cadogan.
