= William Cadogan, 1st Earl Cadogan =

British army officer, diplomat and politician (1672–1726)

General The Right Honourable The Earl Cadogan KT PC
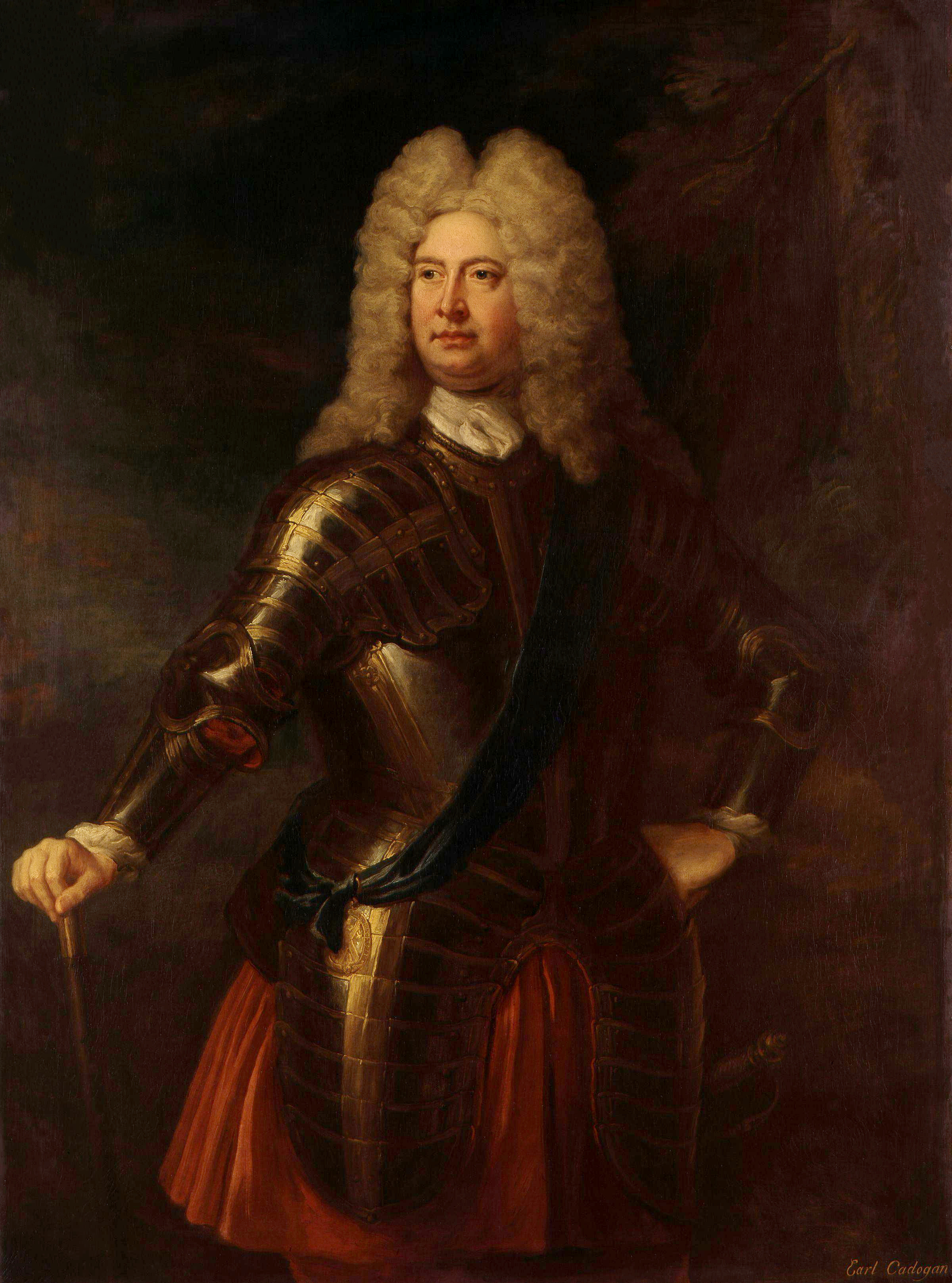
- Portrait by Louis Laguerre, c. 1716
- Born: 1672; Liscartan, County Meath
- Died: 17 July 1726 (aged 53–54); Kensington, London
- Burial place: Westminster Abbey, London
- Military career
- Allegiance: Williamites; England; Great Britain
- Branch: Army of the North; English Army; British Army
- Service years: 1689–1726
- Rank: General
- Units: James Wynne's Regiment of Dragoons; Thomas Erle's Regiment of Foot; 1st Foot Guards
- Commands: William Cadogan's Regiment of Horse
- Conflicts: Williamite War in Ireland; Battle of the Boyne; Siege of Cork; Siege of Limerick (1691); Nine Years War; Siege of Namur (1695); War of the Spanish Succession; Capture of Liège (1702); Passage of the Lines of Brabant; Battle of Schellenberg; Battle of Blenheim; Battle of Ramillies; Battle of Oudenarde; Siege of Lille (1708); Battle of Malplaquet; Bombardment of Arras; Jacobite rising of 1715

General William Cadogan, 1st Earl Cadogan, KT, PC (c. 1672 – 17 July 1726) was a British army officer, diplomat and Whig politician. He began his military career during the Williamite War in Ireland in 1689 and ended it with the suppression of the Jacobite rising of 1715. A close associate and confidant of John Churchill, 1st Duke of Marlborough, Cadogan also sat in the English and British House of Commons from 1705 until 1716, when he was raised to the peerage of Great Britain as Baron Cadogan. A strong supporter of the Hanoverian Succession, Cadogan succeeded Marlborough in 1722 as Master-General of the Ordnance and senior army commander.

== Early life ==
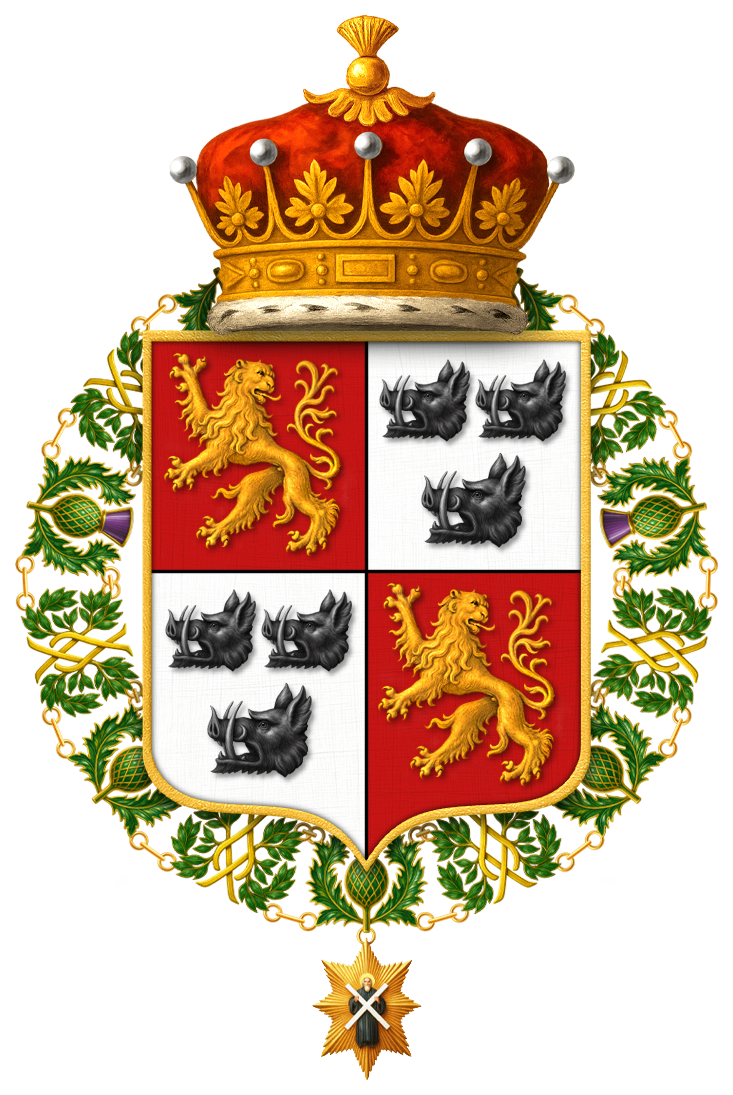
Cadogan's coat of arms

William Cadogan was born c. 1672 in his family's estate of Liscartan in County Meath. He was the son of the Anglo-Irish barrister Henry Cadogan and his wife Bridget. Cadogan was one of five children, including two brothers Ambrose and Charles and two sisters: Frances, who died young, and Penelope, who married Sir Thomas Prendergast. Cadogan's father served as high sheriff of County Meath and owned property in County Limerick. At the age of ten, Cadogan was sent to England to be educated at Westminster School, then run by Richard Busby. Cadogan's father intended him to take up a law career like himself and in March 1687 Cadogan was accepted as a student at Trinity College, Dublin.

== Williamite War in Ireland ==
Midway through Cadogan's studies the Glorious Revolution occurred when William of Orange invaded England in November 1688 and overthrew the Catholic James II, being crowned as William III in early 1689. In Ireland the largely Catholic Irish Army remained loyal to James as Jacobites while Irish Protestants declared their support for William as Williamites. In early 1689 the Williamite War in Ireland began and Ulster Protestants raised the Army of the North, which Cadogan joined as a cornet in a dragoon regiment. Though the Army of the North dispersed by mid-1689 after suffering repeated defeats at the hands of Irish Army troops, Cadogan subsequently took part in the successful defence of Enniskillen against the Irish army.

Following the relief of Derry and Enniskillen in July by a Williamite expeditionary force under Major-general Percy Kirke, Cadogan joined James Wynne's Regiment of Dragoons as an officer and served with the regiment for the rest of the war. Cadogan was present at Dundalk Camp during the autumn of 1689 when Dutch and Williamite troops under William III suffered heavy casualties from disease. On 1 July 1690 Cadogan fought at the Battle of the Boyne, a major victory in which William III personally led his forces to victory over a Jacobite army, resulting in the capture of Dublin. In September Cadogan took part in the siege of Cork where he served alongside Lieutenant-general Lord Marlborough. It was possible at this siege that Cadogan, though only a junior officer, came to the attention of his future commander through his conduct.

Following the decisive Williamite victory at the siege of Limerick in October 1691, which ended the war, Cadogan served in Ireland for a further three years, having decided to become a professional soldier rather than return to his law studies. In 1694 he joined the English Army by purchasing a captaincy in Thomas Erle's Regiment of Foot, which was then stationed in Flanders as part of the Nine Years' War. In 1695 Cadogan took part in the siege of Namur, an important Grand Alliance victory. Following the 1697 Peace of Ryswick he returned to Ireland where in 1698 Cadogan was promoted to major in James Wynne's Regiment of Dragoons, which had been renamed Charles Ross' Regiment of Dragoons in 1695 after its new colonel.

== War of the Spanish Succession ==
In March 1701 the War of the Spanish Succession broke out and in June Cadogan was appointed as quartermaster general to Marlborough when the latter was chosen to command the British troops in the Low Countries. In July Cadogan accompanied Marlborough and William III to Holland. Though England had not yet officially entered the war military preparations were already underway, and Cadogan learnt to speak Dutch during this period, having earlier become fluent in French. During his time in Amsterdam he fell in love with the Dutch heiress Margaretta Munter and married her two years later.

England officially entered the war in May 1702 following William III's death and Queen Anne's ascension to the English throne. Cadogan was appointed as Marlborough's chief of staff and soon became a trusted figure to his commander. Demonstrating a flair for logistics and administration, Cadogan also came to oversee intelligence-gathering operations. In October an Anglo-Dutch army under Marlborough captured Liège from France which resulted in the French Royal Army retreating behind the Mehaigne river. For his services in the campaign which led to the city's capture Cadogan was made colonel of his own regiment of horse.

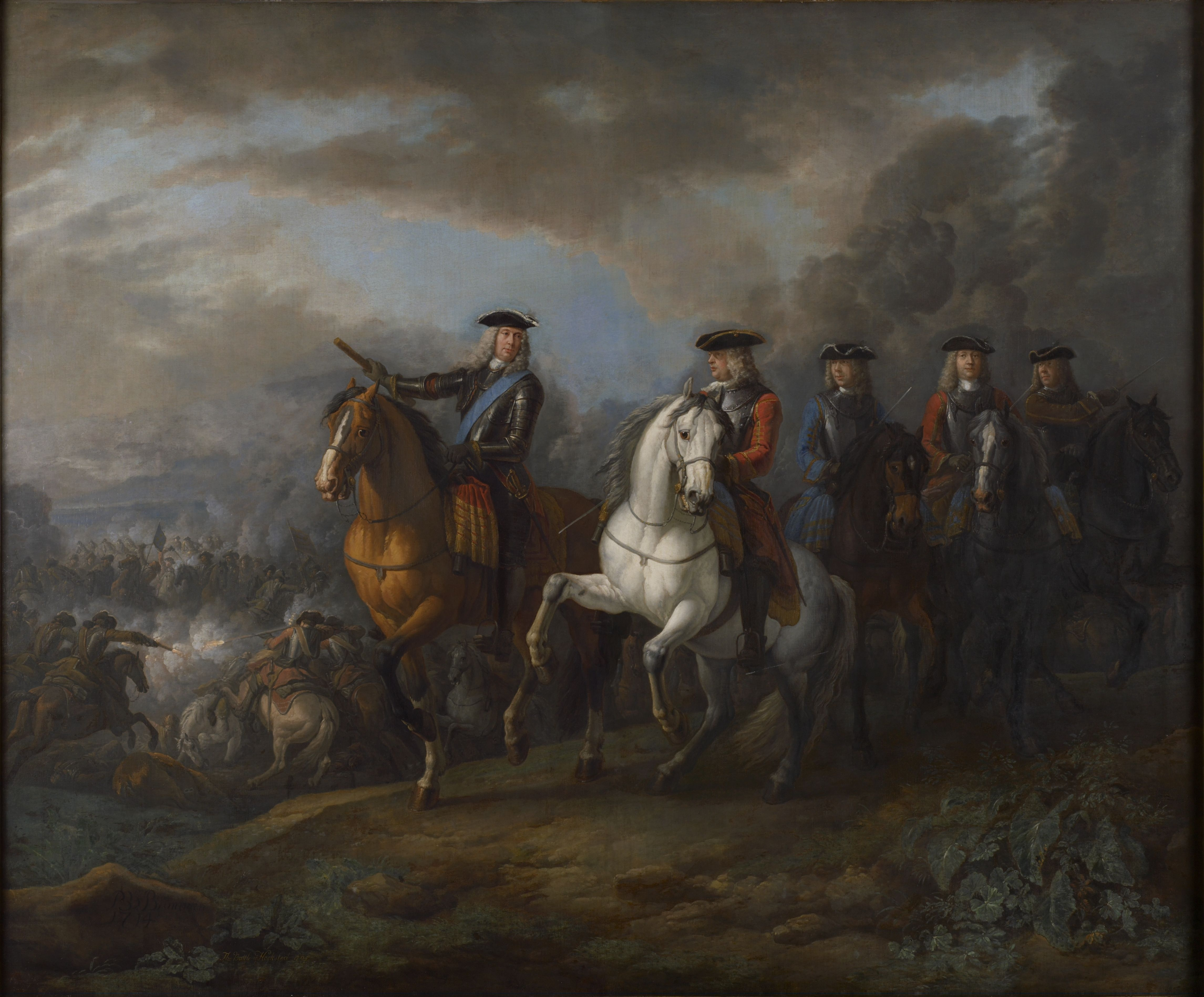
1714 painting of Cadogan (fourth from right) at the Battle of Blenheim

In early 1704 Cadogan returned to England to organise reinforcements to send to the continent, having an audience with Queen Anne in London before returning to the Dutch Republic. Following his return he was one of the few men entrusted with the truth of Marlborough's march to the Danube from the Spanish Netherlands and played a major role in organising it. Writing that "This march has hardly left me time to eat or sleep", Cadogan fought at the Battle of Schellenberg on 2 July, where his horse was shot out from under him. He subsequently fought at the Battle of Blenheim on 13 August as part of Marlborough's battlefield staff. On 25 August Cadogan was promoted to brigadier general.

On 11 May 1705 Cadogan was elected to the House of Commons for Woodstock and on 18 July he fought at the Battle of Elixheim, where his regiment led a successful charge against the Bavarian Army. Later in the year Cadogan was sent to Vienna and then Hanover as a diplomatic envoy to Austria and the Electorate of Hanover. On the morning of 23 May 1706 Cadogan commanded the Allied army's scouts which located a French army, beginning the Battle of Ramillies; he acted as a senior messenger for Marlborough during the battle. Immediately after the battle Cadogan occupied Ghent with a force of infantry and cavalry along with successfully demanding Antwerp's Franco-Spanish garrison to evacuate the city.

Promoted to major general on 1 June 1706 Cadogan was captured by French troops while scouting their positions on 16 August and taken as a prisoner to Tournai. Marlborough was distressed when he heard that Cadogan was missing, proclaiming "I shall not be quiet till I know his fate". Within two days an exchange had been agreed upon, with Cadogan being released on parole the day after the agreement and eventually being exchanged for a French general captured at Ramillies. In late 1706 he played a leading role in preparing the Allied army to go into winter quarters and in February 1707 Cadogan explained English military plans to the Dutch field deputies before being appointed as England's ambassador to the Dutch Republic later in the year; Cadogan retained his military appointments and was rarely present at the Hague.

In February 1708 Cadogan supervised at Ostend the embarkation of ten British cavalry regiments for England to defend against the planned French invasion of Britain. On 11 July 1708 he commanded the Allied vanguard at the Battle of Oudenarde, crossing the River Scheldt and capturing four French battalions. In late 1708 Cadogan oversaw the delivery of supplies to the Anglo-Dutch army besieging Lille and on 1 January 1709 was promoted to lieutenant-general. On 11 September he fought at the Battle of Malplaquet before participating in the siege of Mons, where he was wounded in the neck but quickly recovered. In December 1709 he was appointed as the Lieutenant of the Tower of London. During the siege of Bouchain Cadogan again commanded the Allied vanguard and established a bridgehead prior to Marlborough's arrival with the main army.

Cadogan was present at a diplomatic conference with the field deputies at the Hague in January 1710. Having been replaced as ambassador to the Dutch Republic by Charles Townshend, 2nd Viscount Townshend in 1709, much to Marlborough's displeasure, Cadogan returned to his staff duties and in mid-1710 participated in the siege of Douai before commanding several cavalry squadrons at the siege of Bouchain in 1711. The capture of Bouchain proved to Marlborough's last engagement as both he and his fellow Whig Cadogan were becoming rapidly unpopular among the Tory Harley ministry, who accused the pair of being war profiteers. When Marlborough was replaced by Captain-general Lord Ormonde in 1712 Cadogan was not given a command but successfully requested to stay in the field as a quartermaster general. When British troops in the Low Countries were recalled to Britain Cadogan retired to the Dutch Republic, with Marlborough following him in November 1712.

== Exile ==
Cadogan's retirement had cost him his rank, positions and emoluments under the Crown. He was strongly opposed to the terms of the Peace of Utrecht which the Harley ministry agreed to, siding with opposition Whigs who called for "No Peace Without Spain". During Marlborough's voluntary exile during the last years of Queen Anne's reign Cadogan accompanied him and often acted as a go-between to maintain Marlborough's links with Britain. When George I of Hanover succeeded to the British throne in 1714 he reinstated Cadogan to his military offices. Marlborough was reappointed commander-in-chief, although as his deputy Cadogan had increasingly to take on much of Marlborough's workload. Cadogan was rewarded by the new regime by being again made the ambassador to the Dutch Republic. He was tasked with restoring Anglo-Dutch relations which had been badly damaged by Britain's withdrawal from the War of the Spanish Succession in 1712. Cadogan oversaw negotiations for a fresh Barrier Treaty which was concluded in 1715.

== Jacobite rising of 1715 ==
In 1715 he replaced Lieutenant-general John Campbell, 2nd Duke of Argyll as commander of the troops involved in suppressing the Jacobite rising of 1715. The rebellion had broken out in Autumn 1715 in the Scottish Highlands. Argyll, then serving as the Commander-in-Chief, Scotland, led the initial attempts to defeat the Jacobite rebels from his position at Stirling Castle. In November Argyll fought an intense but indecisive battle against the Jacobites at the Battle of Sherrifmuir, after which it was decided in London that he was insufficiently committed to the Hanoverian cause.

Cadogan was then sent north by Marlborough to provide effective leadership. He brought with him many of the 6,000 Dutch troops supplied as part of a treaty commitment, whose shipping to Britain he had overseen. During his absence from The Hague, the diplomat Horatio Walpole fulfilled his duties there. Cadogan found that Argyll remained reluctant to move against the Jacobites due to the wintery conditions. This continued even after James Stuart, who proclaimed himself to be King, arrived near Aberdeen in December.

Argyll and Cadogan worked together for a while, although the Duke no longer enjoyed the confidence of the government in London. Cadogan established better supply lines for the Army, personally took part in scouting operations, and organised the advance on the rebel capital at Perth. Rather than face a siege of the city, the Jacobites withdrew to Dundee. In February 1716, James abandoned the attempt to personally lead the rebellion in Scotland and sailed for the Continent.

Soon afterwards, Argyll resigned and went to London, turning over total command to Cadogan. He was shortly afterwards dismissed from all his military and political roles, amidst allegations that he had Jacobite sympathies. Cadogan's task was to oversee continued military operations across northern Scotland, forcing the leading Clan chiefs to submit. In April Cadogan declared the rebellion to be over, and returned to London the following month. Marlborough was instrumental in securing him a peerage as a reward for his efforts during the campaign.

== Later life ==
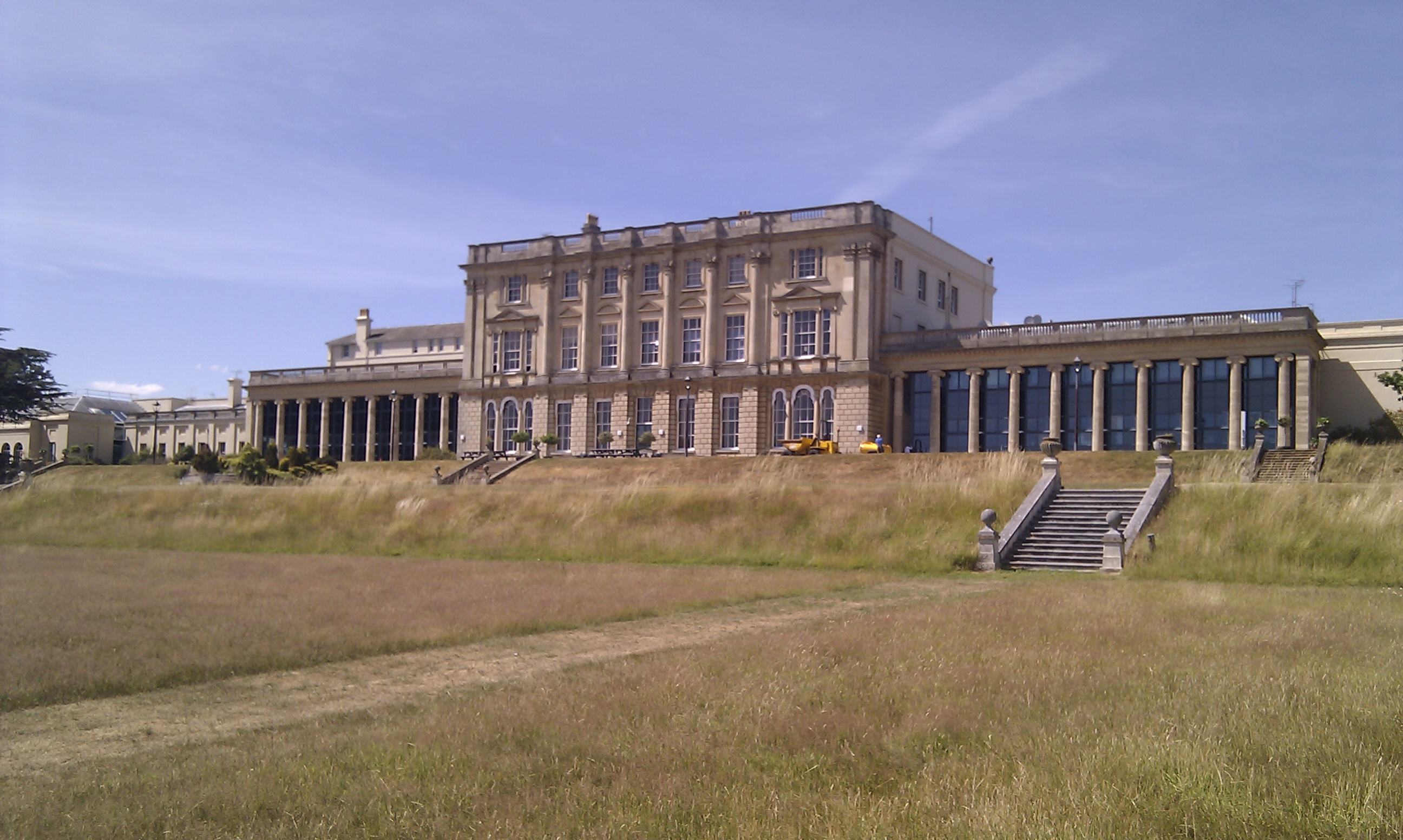
Caversham Park, Cadogan's country house

Cadogan represented Woodstock in the English and British House of Commons as a Whig MP from 1705 to 1716. On 21 June 1716 he was made Baron Cadogan of Reading, having recently purchased Caversham Park, which was located near Reading. Cadogan was also made a Knight of the Thistle in the same year and in 1717 was appointed to the Privy Council and promoted to general. On 8 May 1718 George I made him Earl Cadogan of Oakley and Viscount Caversham of Caversham. Cadogan served as Master of the Robes from 1714 to 1726 and governor of the Isle of Wight from 1715 to 1726.

When Marlborough died in 1722, Cadogan walked at the head of the procession at his funeral. He succeeded his former commander as Master-General of the Ordnance (1722–1725). However, the Opposition's staunch hostility towards him meant that he had lost any political influence several years before his death on 17 July 1726. Despite his closeness to Marlborough, he was much occupied in his later years with a lawsuit brought against him by Marlborough's widow. He was himself rather litigious by nature, even engaging in a bitter lawsuit against his own sister Penelope over her son's inheritance.

== Family ==
He married Margaret Cecilia Munter in April 1704 at The Hague. They had two daughters: Sarah (born 18 September 1705), who married Charles Lennox, 2nd Duke of Richmond, and Margaret (born 21 February 1707), who married Charles John Bentinck, fourth son of William Bentinck, 1st Earl of Portland. With no male heir the earldom became extinct. His younger brother Charles, who had married Elizabeth Sloane, the daughter of the noted Irish-born physician and landowner Sir Hans Sloane, inherited the barony by special remainder, passing it down through his son.

== Bibliography ==
- Szechi, Daniel. 1715: The Great Jacobite Rebellion. Yale University Press, 2006.
- Watson, J.N.P. Marlborough's Shadow: The Life of the First Earl Cadogan. Leo Cooper, 2003.
- Webb, Stephen Saunders. Marlborough's America. Yale University Press, 2013.

Parliament of England
Preceded by James Bertie; Sir William Glynne, Bt	Member of Parliament for Woodstock; 1705–1707; With: Charles Bertie	Succeeded by Parliament of Great Britain
Parliament of England
Preceded by Parliament of England	Member of Parliament for Woodstock; 1707–1716; With: Charles Bertie 1707–1708; Sir Thomas Wheate, Bt 1708–1716	Succeeded by Sir Thomas Wheate, Bt; William Clayton
Diplomatic posts
Preceded by George Stepney	British Ambassador to the Netherlands; 1707–1709	Succeeded by Viscount Townshend
Preceded by The Earl of Strafford	British Ambassador to the Netherlands; 1714–1720	Succeeded by Charles Whitworth
Preceded by François-Louis de Pesmes de Saint-Saphorin as Chargé d'Affaires	British Ambassador to the Holy Roman Emperor; April–October 1720	Succeeded by François-Louis de Pesmes de Saint-Saphorin as Chargé d'Affaires
Military offices
Preceded by The Earl of Arran	Colonel of William Cadogan's Regiment of Horse; 1703–1712	Succeeded by George Kellum
Preceded by Charles Churchill	Colonel of the Coldstream Regiment of Foot Guards; 1714–1722	Succeeded by The Earl of Scarbrough
Preceded by The Duke of Marlborough	Master-General of the Ordnance; 1722–1725	Succeeded by The Duke of Argyll
Preceded by The Duke of Marlborough	Colonel of the 1st Regiment of Foot Guards; 1722–1726	Succeeded by Sir Charles Wills
Court offices
Preceded by Cornelius Nassau	Master of the Robes; 1714–1726	Succeeded by Viscount Malpas
Honorary titles
Preceded by Charles Churchill	Lieutenant of the Tower of London; 1709–1713	Succeeded by Hatton Compton
Preceded by John Richmond Webb	Governor of the Isle of Wight; 1715–1726	Succeeded by The Duke of Bolton
Peerage of Great Britain
New creation	Earl Cadogan; 1718–1726	Extinct
New creation	Baron Cadogan; 1716–1726	Extinct
New creation	Baron Cadogan; 1718–1726	Succeeded by Charles Cadogan
