= Wicken, Northamptonshire =

Village in Northamptonshire, England

Coordinates: 52.0489°N 0.9150°W

Wicken
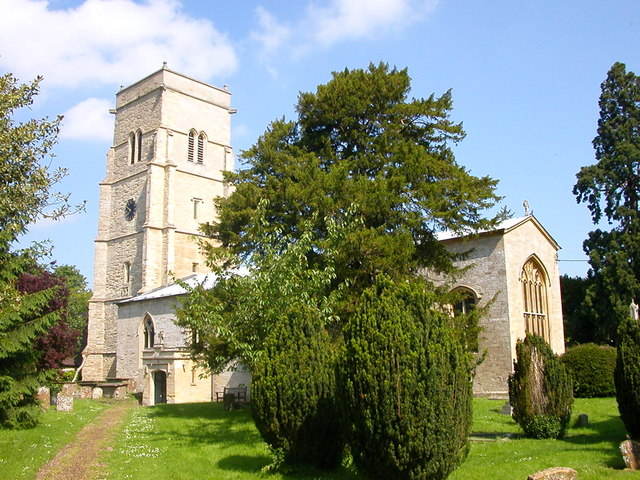
- St John the Evangelist Church

- Location within Northamptonshire
- Interactive map of Wicken
- Population: 295 (2011)
- OS grid reference: SP7439
- Unitary authority: West Northamptonshire
- Ceremonial county: Northamptonshire
- Region: East Midlands
- Country: England
- Sovereign state: United Kingdom
- Post town: Milton Keynes
- Postcode district: MK19
- Dialling code: 01908
- Police: Northamptonshire
- Fire: Northamptonshire
- Ambulance: East Midlands
- UK Parliament: Daventry

Wicken is a village and civil parish in the English county of Northamptonshire. It is about one mile north of the A422 road between Milton Keynes and Buckingham and forms part of West Northamptonshire district. At the time of the 2001 census, the parish's population was 299 people, reducing slightly to 295 at the 2011 Census.

== History ==
The earliest archeological remains for the area are a prehistoric ring ditch, although the first identified settlement is a small Roman settlement on the edge of the modern village. The modern village dates from Saxon times and is mentioned in the Domesday Book.

During the Middle Ages, it seems to have functioned as two villages: Wick Dive and Wick Hamon, separated by a stream and both in separate manors.

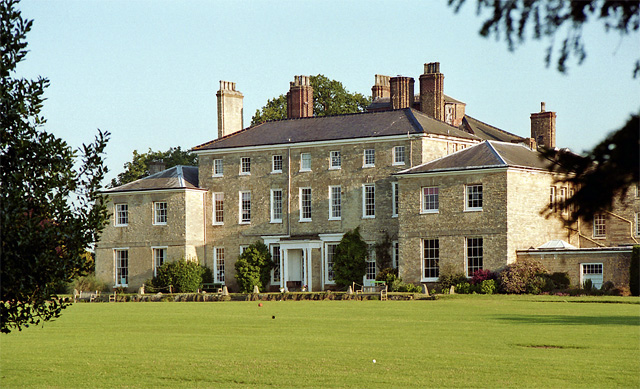
Wicken Park

In 1511 the two manors were purchased by John Spencer of Snitterfield, Warwicks., whose grandson, Sir John Spencer of Wormleighton, secured in 1587, the union of Wick Dive and Wick Hamon into one parish.

An episode of the Channel 4 TV programme Time Team featured multiple archaeological digs in Wicken and researched its history. The archaeologists concluded that Wick Hamon, adjoining the Roman site was the older of the two villages by two centuries, and that the pre-existing (or abandoned) Roman settlement attracted the Saxons to that location.

== Name ==
The modern name of Wicken dates from the 1587 union of the two manors. The names of the two earlier villages derive from the name of their respective landlords. The wealthier Wick Dive takes its name from William de Dive, who acquired it in 1242, while Wick Hamon derives from the de Hamon family, who held the estate in the 12th century.

The Wick portion is either derived from the Saxon word wick for farm or the Roman word vicus for settlement, often associated with an adjacent Roman garrison, farm, or centre of industry. This is the most likely origin of the name here.
