= HMS Fox (1740) =

20-gun frigate of the Royal Navy lost in a gale in 1745

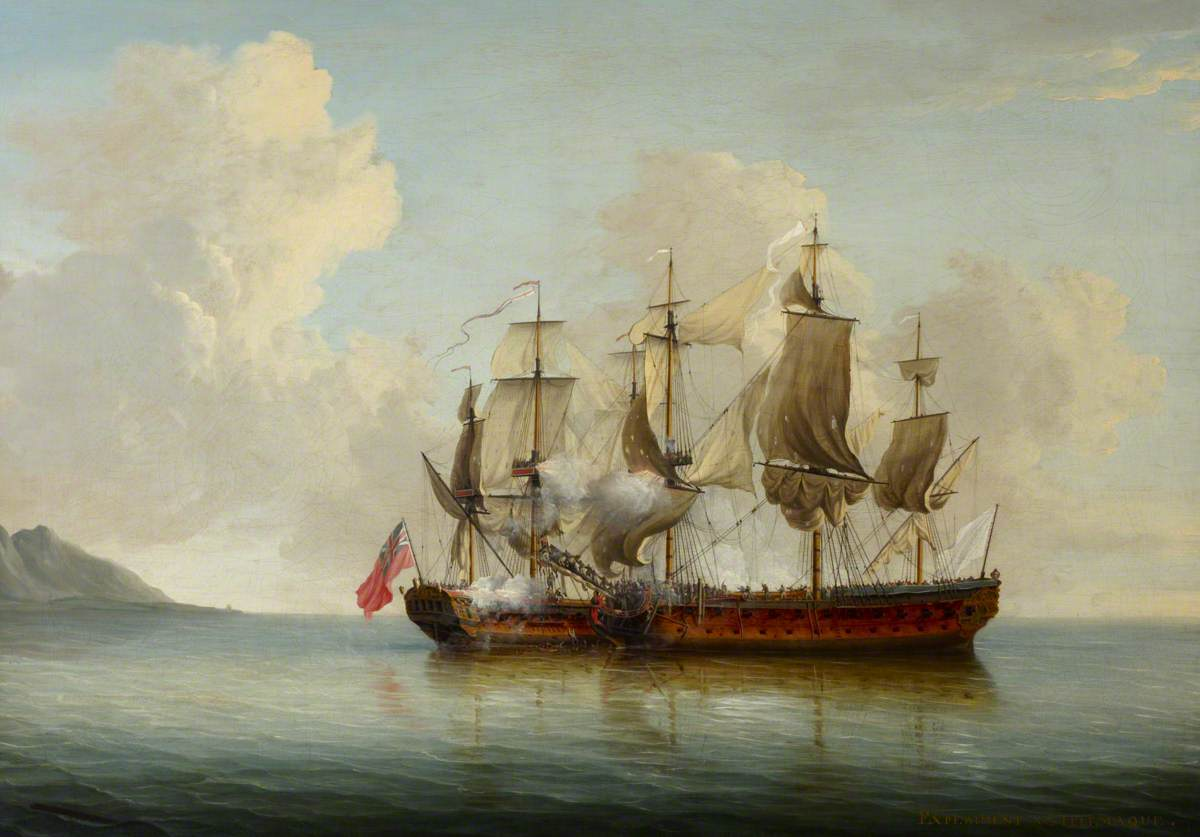
- HMS Fox's sister ship Experiment (L) takes the French ship Telemaque (R)

History

Great Britain
- Name: HMS Fox
- Namesake: Fox
- Ordered: 13 August 1739
- Builder: John Buxton Sr, Rotherhithe
- Cost: £3,771.5
- Laid down: 16 September 1739
- Launched: 1 May 1740
- Completed: 27 June 1740
- Commissioned: April 1740
- Fate: Lost in a gale, 1745

General characteristics
- Class & type: Sixth-rate frigate
- Tons burthen: 44018/94 (bm)
- Length: 106 ft 8 in (32.5 m) (gundeck); 87 ft 11 1/8 in (26.8 m) (keel)
- Beam: 30 ft 8 1/8 in (9.4 m)
- Depth of hold: 9 ft 6 in (2.9 m)
- Propulsion: Sails
- Complement: 140
- Armament: Gundeck: 20 × 9-pounder guns

HMS Fox was a 20-gun sixth-rate frigate of the Royal Navy. She was constructed at Rotherhithe by John Buxton senior, and launched in 1740. Fox was part of the 1733 Establishment built in response to the upcoming War of the Austrian Succession and spent the majority of her career patrolling for privateers and smaller hostile craft, and protecting convoys. She was active during the Jacobite rising of 1745, contributing troops at the Battle of Prestonpans and protecting the advancing army and supplies of John Cope, before succumbing to a storm off Dunbar on 14 November 1745.

== Construction ==
Fox was a 20-gun, 9-pounder frigate. She was part of the second batch of 20-gun frigates ordered to the 1733 Establishment. This batch was initially a series of twelve ships with another two being added in June 1740. Fox and her batch were ordered just prior to the outbreak of the War of the Austrian Succession which began in October 1739, and to ease production were contracted to commercial yards such as John Buxton senior's at Rotherhithe. The class was nominally designed by Jacob Acworth but likely took inspiration from HMS Tartar, a 32-gun frigate rebuilt as a prototype 20-gun frigate in 1734 and designed by Richard Stacey. Fox's group differed to the first batch in having two extra pairs of widely spaced gun ports to the rear of their lower decks. In 1745 these ports were filled with the addition of more 9-pounders and the ships were re-rated as 24-gun ships, however as this was the year Fox was lost it is unlikely she received this upgrade.

Fox was ordered on 13 August 1739 and launched on 1 May 1740 with the following dimensions: 106 feet 8 inches (32.5 m) along the gun deck, 87 feet 11 1/8 inches (26.8 m) at the keel, with a beam of 30 feet 8 1/8 inches (9.4 m) and a depth in the hold of 9 feet 6 inches (2.9 m). She measured 44018/94 tons burthen. She was fitted out on 27 June 1740 at Deptford.

== Service ==
Fox was commissioned in April 1740 under Captain Harcourt Masters to serve in the fleet of Admiral John Norris in the English Channel. Fox captured two Spanish privateers before going to the Hamoaze for a refit on 10 October. Command of Fox had changed to Captain Richard Edwards by November, and she was sailing off Lisbon. During Edwards' time in command Fox took the 10-gun Spanish privateer Justa Refina. Later in the year she escorted, with HMS Greenwich and HMS St Albans, a convoy of transports containing 2,000 troops which arrived at Jamaica on 15 January 1742. In November 1742 Fox was serving off the Canary Islands under Captain Robert Erskine, where she took three privateers. On 2 February Fox took Nuestra Señora del Humildade, and seventeen days later Sancta Justa Rufina; on 14 March Nuestra Señora de la Esclavitud was taken. In June 1743, she took the sloop Bumper with 500 barrels of Irish butter on board, which were later sold in Plymouth. On 14 March 1744 Fox was cruising off the coast of Portugal and discovered a 'famous' 5-gun privateer which had sailed out of Bayonne, she took the ship after a chase of five hours. (Note: Michael Phillips has the privateer's arsenal as 6 guns instead of 5. As well as the cannons, the ship was well-armed with six swivel guns and twelve coehorns.)

On 18 April 1744, Captain Edmund Beavor took command to serve in the North Sea and around the coast of Scotland. In July, she escorted a convoy, alongside HMS Hind, of fifty-seven ships from Hamburg. She took the 14-gun privateer Le Bien-Aimé Louis on 15 May 1745 off Flamborough Head. (Note: Rif Winfield states that this was 10 May and not 15 May.) Fox had chased the ship overnight and upon catching her at around 9 A.M. Louis attempted to turn and fire at Fox, but in doing so lost all her top masts, and surrendered immediately. Soon after this event Fox was ordered to concentrate her work around the coasts of Scotland, due to the outbreak in August of the Jacobite rising of 1745. She patrolled the Firth of Forth, investigating the credentials of ships using those waters for Jacobite interests. From September Fox was based in Leith Roads, where she assisted in transporting the army of General John Cope and in obstructing Jacobite communications. After Cope's loss at the Battle of Prestonpans on 21 September, a number of soldiers came to Fox to seek refuge, as the gates of Edinburgh were held by enemy forces. Fox also played a more direct role in the battle, with some of her sailors being lent to Cope as artillerymen and fleeing from charging Scotsmen during the battle.

At the end of September, Fox sent her boat into Berwick with a letter from the commander of the garrison of Edinburgh Castle, Joshua Guest, to the prime minister Lord Newcastle making him aware that the garrison were sending out fake reports that the castle's food supply was very small to entice the rebels into attacking. On 4 October Bonnie Prince Charlie threatened to burn down the house of the lieutenant-governor of the castle, George Preston, if his soldiers did not stop firing on the city. Preston responded by threatening to send Fox to burn Wemyss Castle, but neither of these events occurred. By 13 October Fox was still in the Roads with HMS Ludlow Castle from where she exchanged signals with Edinburgh Castle about the Jacobite presence in the city. Around the same time the rebels made a plan to take a merchant ship, also in the Roads, that had on board cannons, gunpowder, and muskets. This ship was being guarded by Fox as she could no longer reach her intended goal, which was the now rebel-held Leith. The Jacobites intended to put twenty-two sailors aboard the merchant, and sail her into Leith out of the range of Fox's guns; Beavor heard of the plot and placed twenty of his own sailors on board as guards and moved Fox closer, stopping the attack from taking place. Around 26 October three French ships arrived at Montrose with Irish officers, artillerymen, cannons, and funds for the Jacobite cause. In response to this, Rear-Admiral John Byng brought Fox, Ludlow Castle, HMS Gloucester, HMS Hazard, and HMS Happy Janet together in Leith Roads to combat them. The ships spent some time firing ashore but did not kill anyone.

== Loss ==
On 14 November 1745, Fox foundered with all hands while on a cruise in a strong gale off Dunbar. (Note: Some sources claim that there were nine survivors.) Fox was driven ashore by the winds and smashed against jagged rocks off the coast, before breaking up in the nearby Belhaven Bay. Alongside her crew of around 140, she had on board a number of Jacobite prisoners. It is estimated that around 200 men were killed in total.

== Commemoration ==
The loss of Fox is remembered by the local community as a 'human tragedy'. It has been commemorated on a number of its anniversaries. In 2015 the 270-year anniversary was marked by Royal Navy personnel, re-enactors, and the public at Dunbar by prayers followed by a wreath being laid by a lifeboat where Fox came to rest. The 275-year anniversary was marked in 2020 with a live-streamed commemoration that also included the setting of a wreath.
