= Ellen, Countess of Castle Howel =

1794 novel by Anna Maria Bennett

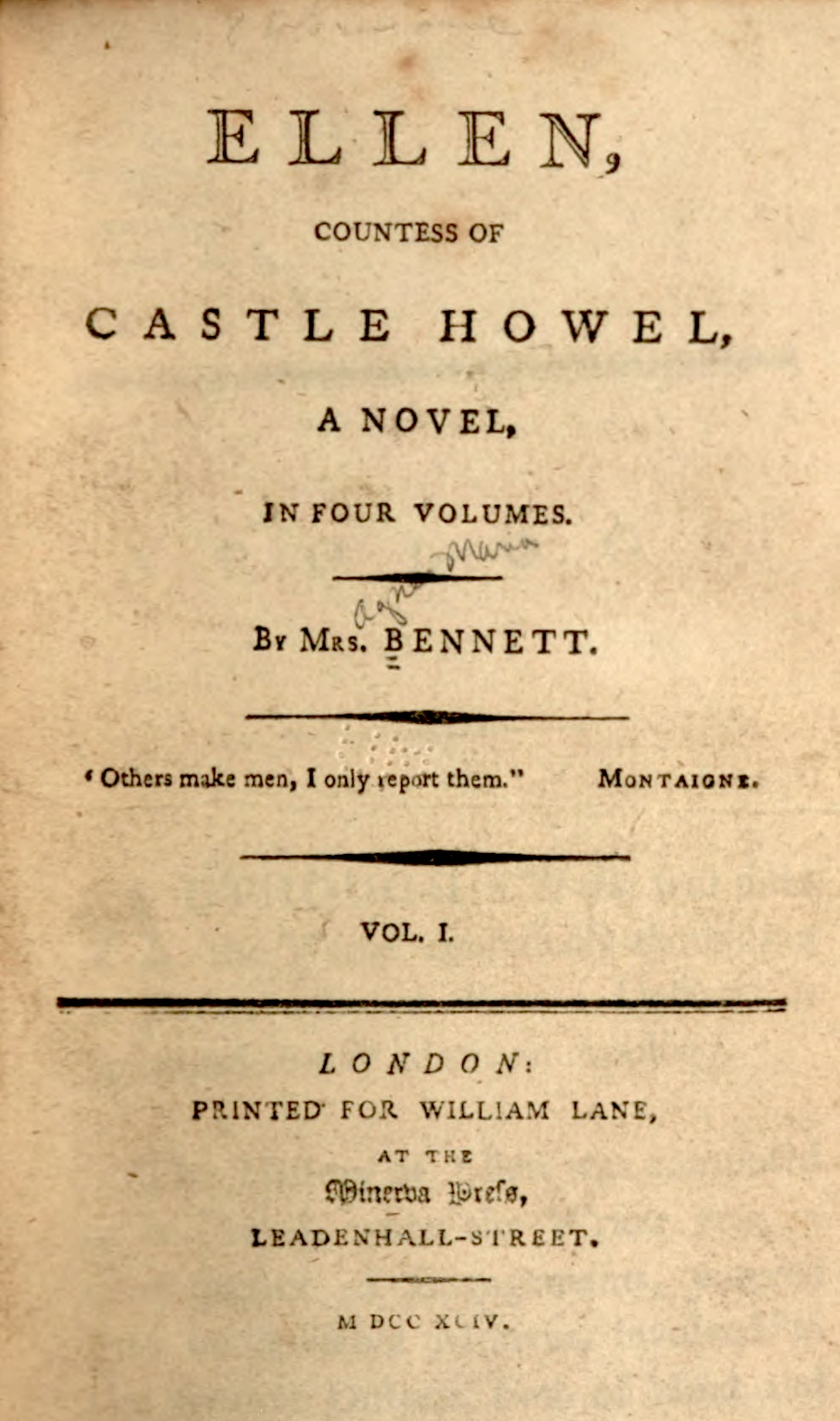
- Author: Anna Maria Bennett
- Publisher: William Lane, Minerva Press
- Publication date: 1794

Ellen, Countess of Castle Howel (1794) is a sentimental Gothic novel by Anna Maria Bennett. It was published in four volumes by the Minerva Press, a prolific publisher of commercial fiction for circulating libraries.

The novel's Welsh heroine, Ellen Meredith, marries the Earl of Castle Howel out of duty after he prevents the foreclosure of her family estate. He abandons her due to false rumours of infidelity, then dies. Ellen is saved from financial ruin by some lucky discoveries, including proof that her childhood love is rightfully a wealthy nobleman, allowing them to marry happily.

Eighteenth-century reviews debated better ways for the story to end: one criticized it for "giving too much weight to the Passion of Love" and argued that the novel ought to have ended with Ellen married to the earl, while another suggested that Ellen ought to have married her childhood love without his elevation to nobility. Today, the novel is acknowledged for its early use of Welsh eye dialect as a literary device, pre-dating the previously-known earliest use of that technique by thirty-four years.

== Synopsis ==
Ellen Meredith is an innocent girl of fifteen raised by her grandparents in an ancient and heavily mortgaged mansion in Wales, known as Code Gwyn. (Note: "Code" is an English spelling for the Welsh word coed ('wood')) She attracts attempted seductions from a Lord Claverton, as well as avuncular patronage from the neighbouring Earl of Castle Howel. He pays to send her to a boarding school. Ellen's family is financially threatened when the owner of their mortgage, the greedy John Morgan, attempts to foreclose on it; they are rescued by the Earl. His wife dies and he proposes marriage to Ellen. She agrees to the marriage out of a sense of duty, breaking things off with her childhood friend Percival Evelyn.

The newlyweds travel to London, where fashionable society entices Ellen into bad habits of gambling, gossip, and flirtation. She becomes pregnant and deeply in debt. The Earl abandons her, and she flees north with no particular destination. One day, while wandering the heath in a violent storm, she is rescued by Percival and taken to an ancient abbey for shelter. Percival's backstory is related. Meanwhile, Lord Claverton (on his deathbed after a duel) tells the Earl that Ellen is innocent. He eagerly reconciles with Ellen, who has recently given birth. Before they can return to London, he is killed in a riding accident.

The Earl's death causes many problems. Ellen discovers that he died insolvent and the victim of embezzlement by his sister; a lawsuit alleges that her new son Arthur is illegitimate; and her grandparents have been evicted by Mr. Morgan, who claims the mortgage was never paid. Ellen discovers an iron chest full of money, evidence of the embezzlement, and proof of the mortgage. A helpful locket reveals that Percival's father is Lord Claverton and his maternal grandfather is Mr. Morgan; now a wealthy nobleman, he abandons his plans to marry the parson's daughter, and marries Ellen instead. The lawsuit is dropped. Percival changes his name to Horatio Claverton and becomes a bishop. He and Ellen live happily with immense riches.

== Composition and publication ==
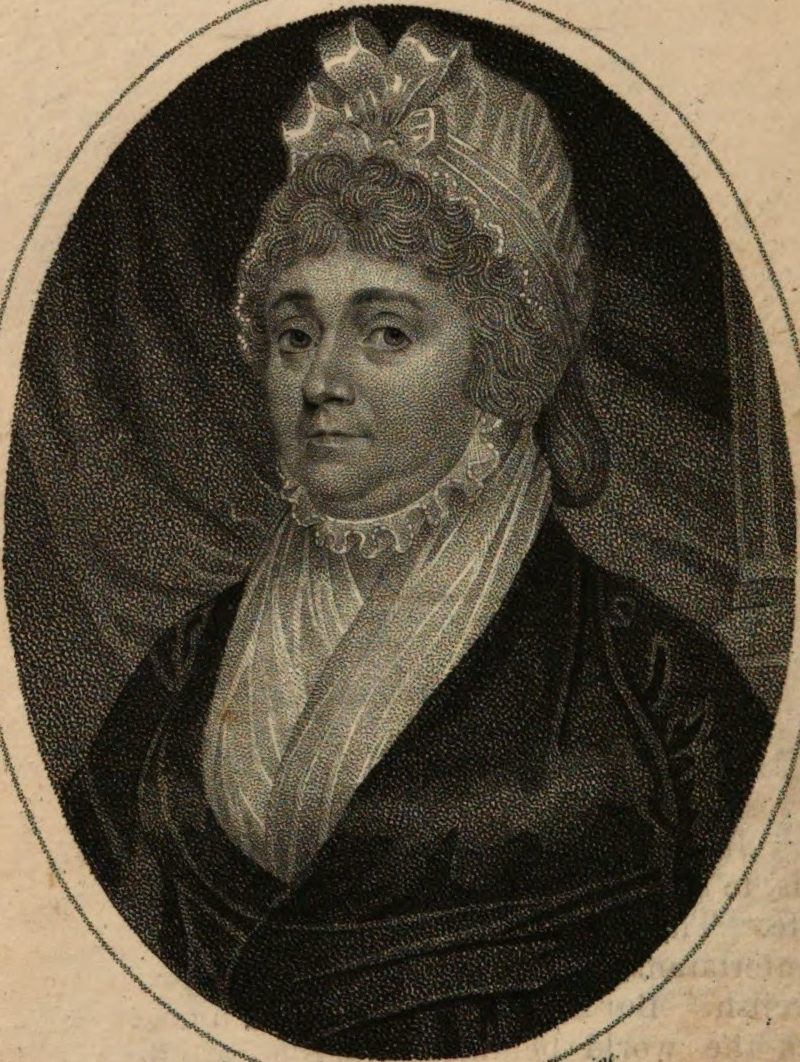
Engraving of Bennett in 1804, ten years after Ellen

Bennett states in the preface of the novel that she wrote it as a form of distraction from substantial personal distress over the previous eighteen months. (Note: Bennett describes herself as "Four Hundred Miles distant from Home, Family and Friends, a Stranger in a Country, where she was literally taken in, her Spirit broken, her Health impaired, her little Fortune sinking, the unoffending Victim of a Party, who forgot their Character and Manhood.") One source of distress was an extended legal battle over her and her daughter's lease for the Edinburgh Theatre Royal. Bennett's daughter Harriet Pye Esten was an actress; Bennett often travelled with her and served as her manager. Esten gained the lease to the Edinburgh Theatre in July 1792, and Bennett managed the theatre while Esten performed in London. Esten's acquisition of the theatre from its former proprietor, Stephen Kemble, was criticized and Kemble sued her. Another source of distress was a scandal over her daughter's affair with Douglas Hamilton, 8th Duke of Hamilton, who had assisted Esten in gaining the theatre lease. The novel's preface is dated London, March 12, 1794; at this point, Esten was pregnant by the Duke. Esten retired from her career as an actress in May 1794 and gave birth in July. The literary critic Moira Dearnley suggests that Ellen's book-four plot twist is an expression of Bennett's escapism, as "Lord Castle Howel is exterminated as a gleeful act of authorial revenge on a nobleman rich enough to buy a young wife."

Ellen was Bennett's fourth novel. It was published as four volumes in mid-February 1794 by the Minerva Press. The Minerva Press was a prolific publisher of commercial fiction for circulating libraries, run by William Lane in London, and particularly associated with both women writers and readers. The conclusion of the novel includes a comment on its relationship to the Press's usual productions: "The few readers who have had patience to accompany the author thus far, will be apt to exclaim, 'Aye! those are the monsters we meet at the end of all LANE'S collections, men without error! and women without faults!'"; Bennett goes on to say that her characters do have faults, but "it would be very rude to pry into secrets ... when concealed, as in the present instance, by the impenetrable veil of IMMENSE RICHES." Two Dublin editions were also released in 1794, followed by a reprint in London in 1805 and a French translation in Paris in 1822. The French edition was translated by Auguste Defauconpret.

== Reception ==
At its first publication, the novel was widely enjoyed by enthusiasts of sentimental fiction. It was reviewed in the Monthly Review in May 1794, and the Critical Review in September 1795. The Monthly Review used Ellen to criticize modern novels in general for "giving too much weight to the Passion of Love." The reviewer says the novel should have ended at the end of volume three, when Ellen has happily reconciled with the Earl and Percival has been rewarded for his friendship with a well-funded parish living and a prospective marriage to a parson's daughter. They particularly criticize Percival for breaking his engagement and for rejoicing at the innocent Earl's death. They state: "We must blame, and severely ... when all situations, however rationally and even affectionately happy, are overset to make way for former love."

The Critical Review also expressed a desire for changes in the plot, in this case suggesting that Ellen and Percival marry without Percival's transformation into a wealthy nobleman: "the ingenuous, intelligent, and amiable Percival Evelyn appears not more respectable when heir to the unprincipled Viscount Claverton, than when ... the deserted orphan and the curate of Little-manor: and we could almost have wished that Ellen, after having once, from motives of filial piety, sacrificed her inclination to the welfare of her family and the merit of lord Castle Howel, had risen superior to the vanity so dazzling to weak minds, and had given an example of 'sagacity to select the good, and courage to honour it according to its degree'". The review's overall assessment is that the novel contains "a greater discrimination of character, variety, and interest, than is usually met with in works of a similar nature."

== Style ==
Ellen has been identified as an early example of free indirect speech and written Welsh dialect. Throughout the novel, Ellen's maidservant Winifred Griffiths expresses her opinions in a Welsh-English eye dialect. According to the literary scholar Starlina Rose, the Welsh dialect characterizes Winifred as "Bennet's idea of a working Welsh woman", and also marks some of the moments where free indirect speech allows Winifred's perspective to be expressed in the third-person narration. For example, in the sentence "Winifred hoped Mister Cordon would call a coach, for no chenteele people falked" (vol. IV, p. 188), the character's accent is expressed through the spelling of "genteel" and "walked", but the sentence is not direct dialogue. Previously, the earliest English novel with Welsh-English dialect was thought to be The Adventures and Vagaries of Twm Shon Catti (1828) by Thomas Jeffery Llewelyn Prichard; Bennett's Ellen pre-dates this novel by thirty-four years. Bennett's use of free indirect speech also pre-dates the works of Jane Austen, who is often associated with mastering the technique in the 1810s.

== Major themes ==
Two core themes of the novel, as identified by the Welsh critic Moira Dearnley, are "the demise of a feudal way of life and the corruption of the 'child of nature'". The demise of feudalism is reflected in the decay of Code Gwyn, which the scholar Francesca Rhydderch also identifies as a symbol of declining Welsh heritage. The corruption of natural innocence takes place when Ellen joins fashionable London society, with gambling and gossip. These themes present a conventional literary dichotomy between the city and the country; in the eighteenth century, this dichotomy would ordinarily resolve with a pastoral moral in favour of the country, but Dearnley argues that the novel also undermines both themes. Although Bennett presents Ellen's rural simplicity as a sign of virtue, Dearnley points out that Bennett also strongly supported female education, and the narrative criticizes Ellen at many points for her ignorance. Similarly, although the novel treats the feudal past with nostalgia and sometimes mourns lost Welsh heritage, other moments mock the "backward" culture and history of Wales. Moreover, Dearnley notes, the Merediths' ancestors are not originally Welsh, but Norman conquerors who seized their estate from an indigenous Welsh population. Rhydderch describes the result as "an ambivalent narrative of Britishness". Rhydderch also draws a political parallel between Ellen and her two suitors, in which Lord Claverton's aggressive pursuit of Ellen represents England's colonization of Wales, while Ellen's marriage to Castle Howel represents an assimilation of English values — less obviously violent, but still a loss of Welsh independence.

The literary historian Frederick S. Frank describes Ellen's blend of sentimental and Gothic genres as a "transitional fiction in which the emphasis is beginning to shift from the realistic scene to the nightmare fantasies of a ... Gothic universe". In particular, he says, "Howel Castle in Wales is not yet equipped for supernatural horrification... it is merely a menacing prison ruled over by a ruthless male who asserts his lust for power through his new marriage." He describes the character of Ellen as enduring her suffering with virtue and patience like the heroines of Samuel Richardson's sentimental novels Pamela (1740) and Clarissa (1748), and like the folkloric figure of Griselda. Dearnley also compares Ellen to William Godwin's novel Caleb Williams (1794), which uses Gothic tropes in a modern setting to critique "things as they are". Bennett critiques the power held by wealthy aristocrats, and expresses bitterness that "a cross, proud, reserved old man" can use his money to pressure a fifteen year old to marry him. Dernley suggests that Bennett's anger about this relationship is driven by the fact that Bennett's daughter has recently followed Bennett's own path by becoming a man's mistress in exchange for money. She argues that several unflattering scenes of Lord Castle Howel and of Ellen's parents are expressions of "the author's barely suppressed anger against the buyers and sellers of the female body."
