= Anna Bennett =

Anne Bennett may refer to:

- Annabelle Bennett (born 1950), judge of the Federal Court of Australia
- Anna Maria Bennett (c. 1750–1808), English novelist
- Anna Bennett (field hockey) (born 1976), English field hockey player
