= Thomas Pye =

Royal Navy Admiral (c. 1708–1785)

Admiral Sir Thomas Pye
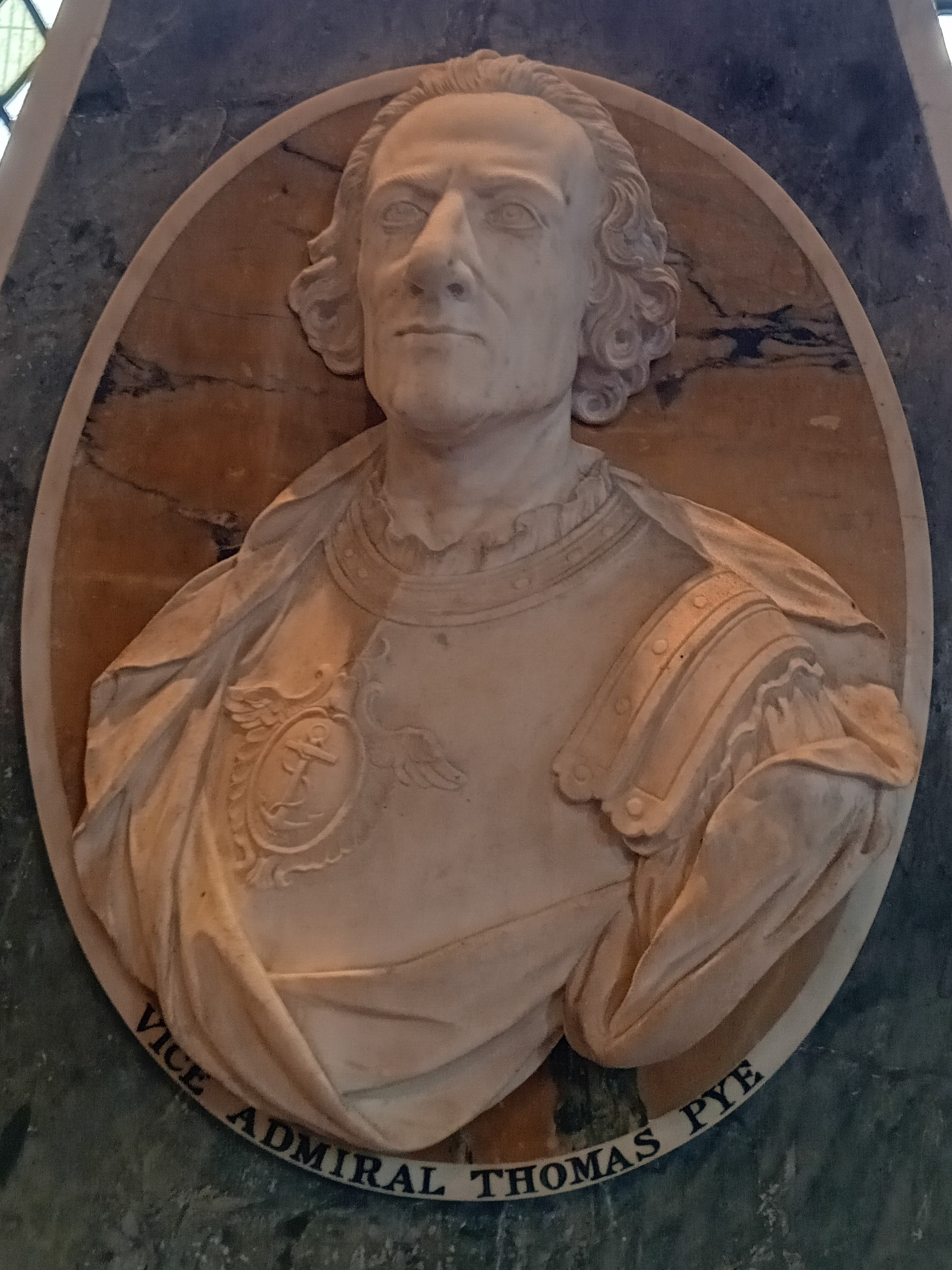
- c. 1762 sculpture
- Born: c. 1708
- Died: 26 December 1785 (aged 76–77); Suffolk Street, London
- Military career
- Allegiance: Kingdom of Great Britain
- Branch: Royal Navy
- Service years: 1734–1783
- Rank: Admiral
- Commands: HMS Seaford; HMS Norfolk; HMS Norwich; HMS Humber; HMS Gosport; HMS Advice; Leeward Islands Station
- Conflicts: War of the Austrian Succession; Seven Years' War; American War of Independence

Admiral Sir Thomas Pye (c. 1708 – 26 December 1785) was a Royal Navy officer who served during the War of the Austrian Succession, the Seven Years' War, and the American War of Independence. He was briefly Member of Parliament for Rochester, and served as commander of several of the navy's principal stations and ports.

Born into a family with powerful political connections, Pye used these to rise rapidly through the ranks, and to receive employments in periods of peace. He commanded a number of ships during the War of the Austrian Succession, and was appointed commander-in-chief in the Leeward Islands, but a fit of temper when he was superseded almost cost him his career. Charged with disobeying orders and other infractions, Pye returned to Britain, where he was able to use his connections, and the absence of the experienced naval officers, to ensure a lenient outcome to his court martial. Despite this he remained unemployed during the Seven Years' War, though he reached flag rank.

Pye did not receive active postings until the end of the Seven Years' War, when he commanded several of the navy's dockyards, and even returned to the Leeward Islands to take up his old post. A brief foray into politics proved lacklustre, he made no impact in parliament, and alienated his constituents. His position as commander-in-chief at Portsmouth during the American War of Independence brought the opportunity for rewards. The fleet was reviewed by the King, and Pye received promotion and a knighthood. He retired after the end of the war and died two years later. He had conducted a long-running affair with the novelist Anna Maria Bennett, and left two children by her, including a daughter who became the famous actress Harriet Pye Bennett.

== Family and early life ==
Thomas Pye was born c. 1708/9, the second son of Henry Pye of Faringdon House in Berkshire (now Oxfordshire) and his wife, Anne, daughter of Sir Benjamin Bathurst of Cirencester in Gloucestershire. He was the great grandson of Robert Pye, the parliamentarian, and was uncle of Henry James Pye, the poet laureate. Through his mother, Pye was related to Allen Bathurst, 1st Earl Bathurst, a powerful politician who would use his influence to speed Pye's rise through the ranks. Pye passed his lieutenant's examination on 12 June 1734 and joined the 48-gun HMS Preston, under Captain Charles Cotterell, on 18 April 1735 as her third lieutenant. His service was initially spent off the British coast, until transferring to the 60-gun HMS Rippon, still under Cotterell, and moving to the Tagus. He was then aboard the 60-gun HMS Warwick, serving in the Mediterranean, before being promoted to his first command, that of the 24-gun HMS Seaford, on 13 April 1741.

== First commands ==
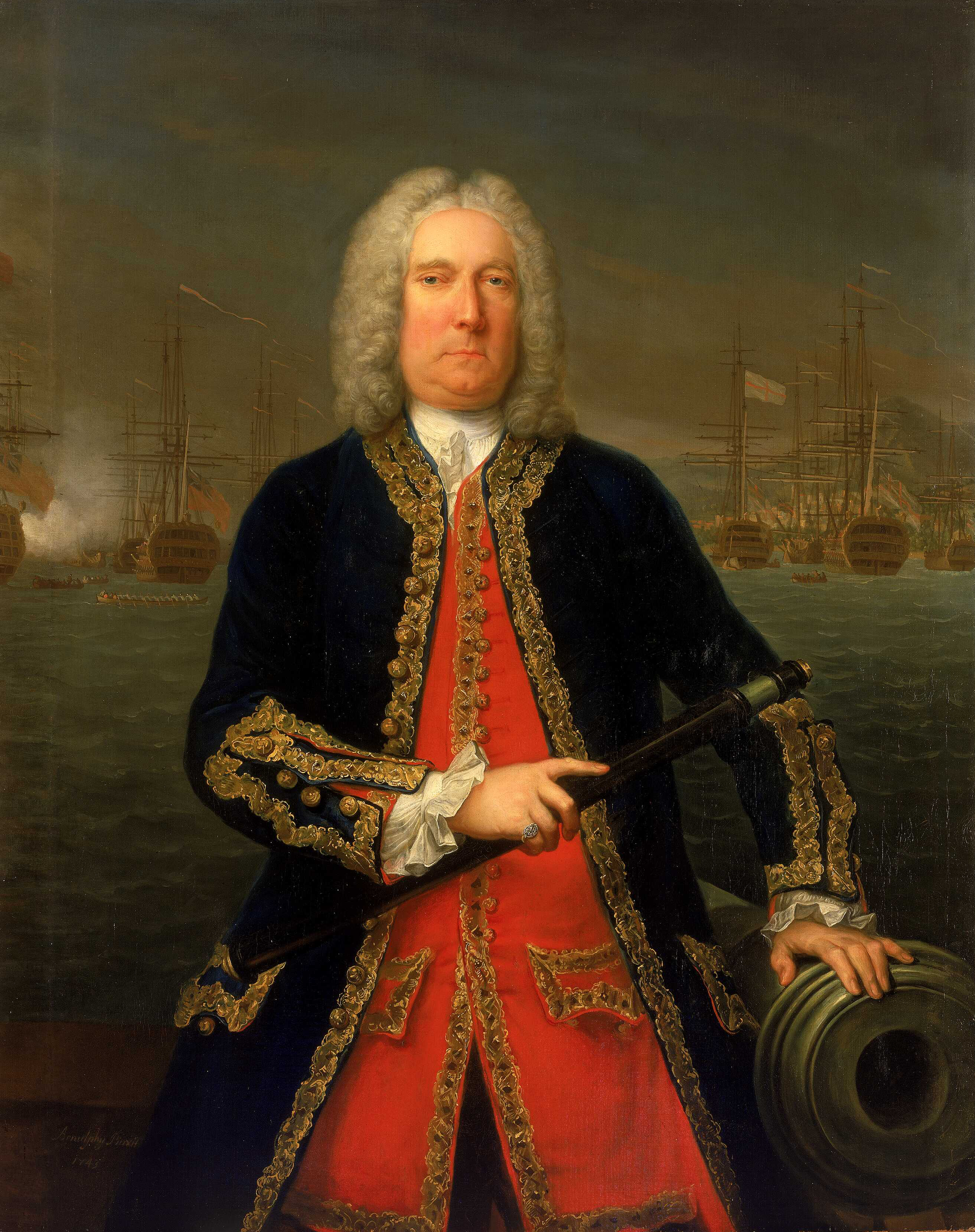
Admiral Thomas Mathews, whom Pye served under in the Mediterranean during the 1740s

He spent the rest of the year being stationed in British waters, after which he joined Admiral Thomas Mathews's fleet, and returned to the Mediterranean. Mathews sent Pye into the Adriatic Sea to disrupt supplies being sent to the Spanish Army in Italy during the War of the Austrian Succession. Pye was then appointed by Mathews to command the 80-gun HMS Norfolk in August 1744, and he remained in the Mediterranean after Mathews's recall, serving under Vice-Admiral Henry Medley and providing support to the Austrian army off the south of France.

Pye returned to England in March 1748, and though the signing of the Treaty of Aix-la-Chapelle in October that year ended the war, he was able to use his connections to secure peacetime employment. He commanded first the 50-gun HMS Norwich, which he took out to North America, and then the 44-gun HMS Humber, which he commissioned in April 1749 and sailed to the west coast of Africa. He took the 44-gun HMS Gosport out to Nova Scotia in June 1751, returning to Britain later that year, before being appointed to the 50-gun HMS Advice in February 1752 to become commander-in-chief in the Leeward Islands Station.

== Disobeying orders and court martial ==
Pye was commander of the station until his replacement, Commodore Thomas Frankland, arrived to supersede him in October 1755. Pye, reportedly angry at this, refused to strike his broad pennant, upon which Frankland reprimanded him for disobeying a superior officer. Frankland brought various other charges against Pye, accusing him of 'financial irregularities, interfering with the purchase of naval stores...', and with having damaged Advice by '...removing parts of her timbers for an unnecessary survey.' Claiming that he would not be able to receive a fair hearing in the Caribbean, Pye instead returned to Britain, causing a bureaucratic quandary as since he should have been tried there, the Admiralty officials for a time did nothing. They eventually convened a court martial from 1 to 4 March 1748, but the senior naval officers at the time, Lord Anson and Edward Boscawen were at sea and could not be present. Pye used his political connections again to his advantage, putting pressure on the civilian members of the board, and while he was duly reprimanded for the lesser charges Frankland brought, he was not charged with disobeying his superior.

== Flag rank ==
Pye was promoted according to his seniority to rear-admiral on 5 July 1758, but received no active employment during the Seven Years' War. He became commander-in-chief at Plymouth in June 1763 during the subsequent peace, and was promoted to vice-admiral on 21 October that year. He returned to his old post as commander-in-chief of the Leeward Islands Station between 1766 and 1769, at first with the 32-gun HMS Lark as his flagship, followed by the 50-gun HMS Chatham. Pye briefly entered politics on returning to Britain, being elected to parliament as Member for Rochester on 9 May 1771. No records exist of him ever speaking in the House of Commons, and he was defeated at the next general election, on 7 October 1774, having apparently alienated his constituents.

Pye became commander-in-chief at Portsmouth on 9 May 1771, a post he held for most of the American War of Independence in two periods of office. During the first he oversaw the fleet during King George III's review at Spithead on 22 June 1773. As a reward for his services Pye was knighted by the King on the deck of the Portsmouth guardship, the 98-gun HMS Barfleur, on 24 June 1773. At the same time the King ordered Pye promoted to admiral. Pye was replaced as commander-in-chief at Portsmouth on 18 May 1774, being succeeded by Sir James Douglas, but resumed the command on 27 May 1777.

=== Keppel's court martial ===
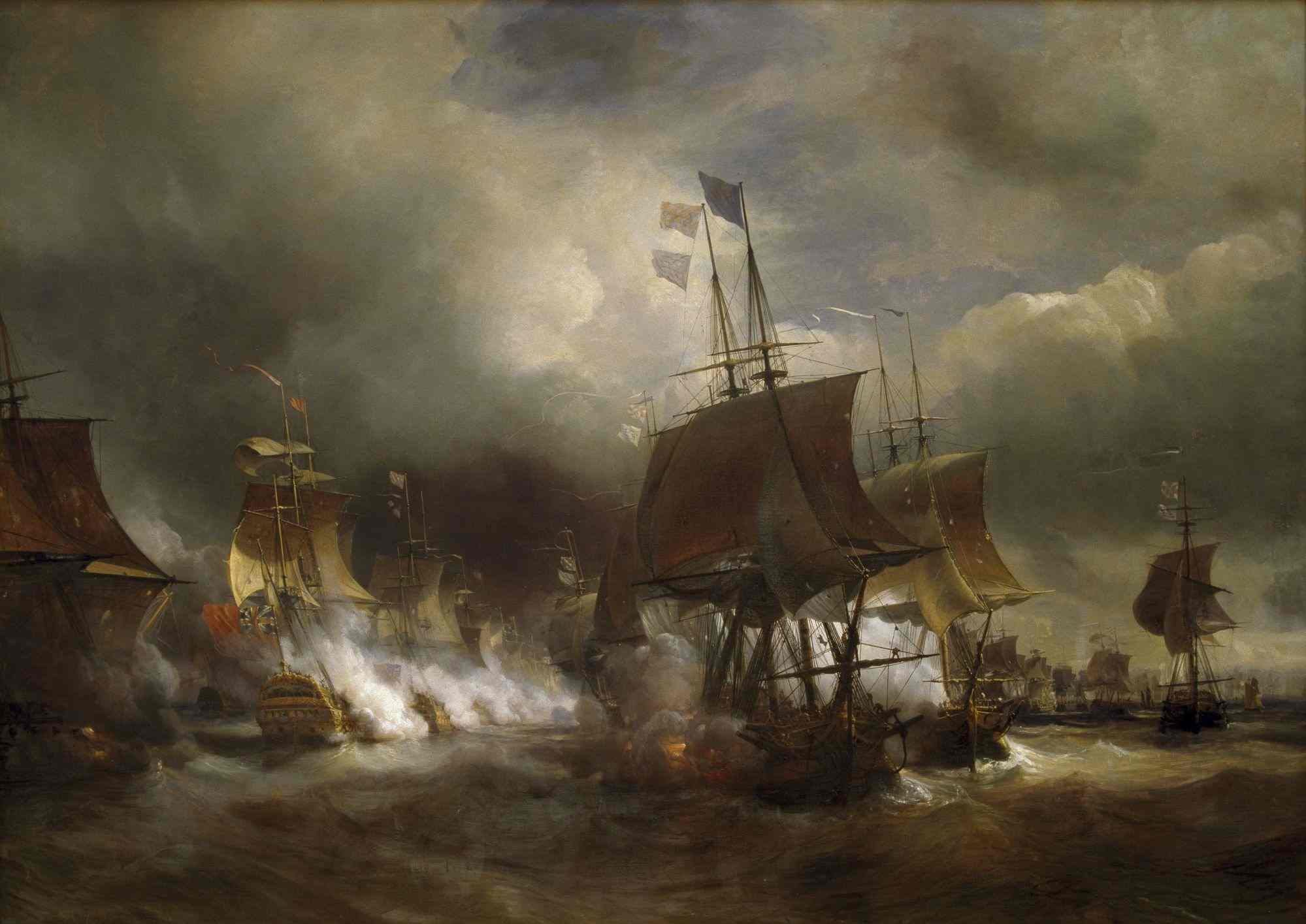
The Battle of Ushant, by Théodore Antoine Gudin. The battle led to a bitter dispute between Keppel and Palliser, with Pye presiding over Keppel's court martial

In his capacity as senior admiral he was president at the court martial of Admiral Augustus Keppel, which was held at Portsmouth in January 1779. He tried to avoid the duty, pleading poor health, but was compelled to take part. Keppel was being investigated for his actions during the Battle of Ushant, which had taken place on 27 July 1778. His subordinate, Admiral Hugh Palliser had brought charges of misconduct and neglect of duty, which the court was compelled to examine. The court was convened aboard HMS Britannia on 7 January, though the rest of the hearings were held at the house of the governor of the garrison. After deliberations, the court returned its verdict on 11 February, unanimously acquitting Keppel, with Pye returning his sword with the observation that '...you will be called forth by your Sovereign to draw it once more in the defence of your country.' (Note: Sitting with Pye on the court were Vice-Admiral Matthew Buckle (who withdrew after six days due to illness), Vice-Admiral John Montagu, Rear-Admirals Mariot Arbuthnot and Robert Roddam, and Captains Mark Milbanke, Francis Samuel Drake, Taylor Penny, John Moutray, William Bennet, Adam Duncan, Philip Boteler and James Cranston.)

== Later life and family ==
Pye was made lieutenant-general of marines on 26 September 1780. He stepped down after the end of the American War of Independence, leaving his post as commander-in-chief at Portsmouth on 31 March 1783, and going into retirement. He died two years later, at his home on Suffolk Street, London, on 26 December 1785. He was survived by his daughter Mary. His wife had died in 1762, and for seventeen years he had carried out an affair with the novelist Anna Maria Bennett, the wife of Thomas Bennett, a customs officer. (Note: The two met while Anna Maria was working in a chandler's shop. She subsequently became Pye's housekeeper and mistress.) Thomas Bennett appears to have owed Pye a sizeable sum of money, which Pye forgave in his will, bequeathing his London residence to Anna Maria. Pye and Bennett appear to have at least two children together, Thomas Pye Bennet, and Harriet Pye Bennett, who went on to become a famous actress.

== Assessment ==
Pye's career was advanced through his political connections, rather than talent. His temper nearly cost him his career, while he managed to make himself so unpopular with his constituents while MP for Rochester that Philip Stephens, the Secretary to the Admiralty, wrote to Lord Hardwicke saying that the voters 'had conceived an utter aversion to our Admiral Sir Thomas Pye, and I find they would have taken anybody who offered himself in preference to him'. He was known to junior officers as 'Goose Pye', while naval historian Nicholas Rodger described him as 'something of a naval grotesque who aroused mingled amusement and contempt'. Pye acknowledged his difficulty expressing himself, writing that 'I had the mortification to be neglected in my education, went to sea at 14 without any, and a man of war was my university.' His biographer Roger Knight described him as 'not a typical mid-eighteenth-century naval officer.'

== Citations ==
Parliament of Great Britain
Preceded by John Calcraft; William Gordon	Member of Parliament for Rochester; 1771–1774; With: John Calcraft 1771–1772; George Finch-Hatton 1772–1774	Succeeded by George Finch-Hatton; Robert Gregory
Military offices
Unknown	Commander-in-Chief, Leeward Islands Station; 1752–1756	Succeeded by Sir Thomas Frankland
Preceded by Lord Colville	Commander-in-Chief, Plymouth; 1763–1766	Succeeded by Sir George Edgcumbe
Preceded by Richard Tyrell	Commander-in-Chief, Leeward Islands Station; 1766–1769	Succeeded by Robert Man
Preceded by Francis Geary	Commander-in-Chief, Portsmouth; 1771–1774	Succeeded by Sir James Douglas
Preceded by Sir James Douglas	Commander-in-Chief, Portsmouth; 1777–1783	Succeeded by John Montagu
