= Governor Edwards =

Governor Edwards may refer to:

- Edward I. Edwards (1863–1931), 37th governor of New Jersey
- Edwin Edwards (1927–2021), 50th governor of Louisiana
- Henry W. Edwards (1779–1847), 27th governor of Connecticut
- James B. Edwards (1927–2014), 110th governor of South Carolina
- John Bel Edwards (born 1966), 56th governor of Louisiana
- John Cummins Edwards (1804–1888), 9th governor of Missouri
- Ninian Edwards (1775–1833), 3rd governor of Illinois
- Richard Edwards (Royal Navy officer, died 1773), governor of Newfoundland in 1746
- Richard Edwards (Royal Navy officer, died 1795), governor of Newfoundland from 1757 to 1759 and from 1779 to 1781
