= Edmond Beavor =

Captain Edmond Beavor
- Died: 14 November 1745

Edmond Beavor (died 1745) was a captain in the British Royal Navy.

== Life ==
Beavor was made a lieutenant on 2 March 1733–4, and whilst serving in the West Indies was promoted by Sir Chaloner Ogle to command the fire ship Stromboli, in the summer of 1743, and, in company with HMS Lion, 60 guns, was sent home with a convoy of thirty merchant-ships. Very bad weather scattered the fleet; several of the convoy were lost, and the Stromboli, demasted and in an almost sinking condition, just managed to get into Kinsale harbour.

There she was refitted, and arrived in the Downs on 21 December. Towards the end of the next year he was appointed to the frigate HMS Fox, and during the spring and summer of 1745 was employed cruising, with some success, against the Dunkirk privateers in the North Sea. In September he was in Leith Roads, assisting the transport of the army, and in stopping, so far as possible, the communications of the rebels. On the evening of the 21st, after the defeat of Sir John Cope's army in the morning, the Fox became a place of refuge for numbers of the soldiers who could not get into the castle, the town gates being held by the enemy. Beavor's position was not an easy one for a young officer; for he had no instructions, and did not know how far his authority extended.

The rebels were in possession of Leith, and would not allow him to communicate with the shore, even to get fresh provisions. On 6 October he wrote that there were 1,200 rebels quartered in Leith; and though he thought that a few shot might dislodge them, he was not certain that it would meet with their lordships' approval. A few weeks later he put to sea on a cruise, and in a violent storm the Fox went down with all hands, 14 November 1745. (Note: Chamock's Biography. Nav. v. 279) (Note: Official Letters in the Public Record Office.)
