= Augustus Simon Frazer =

Sir Augustus Frazer KCB FRS
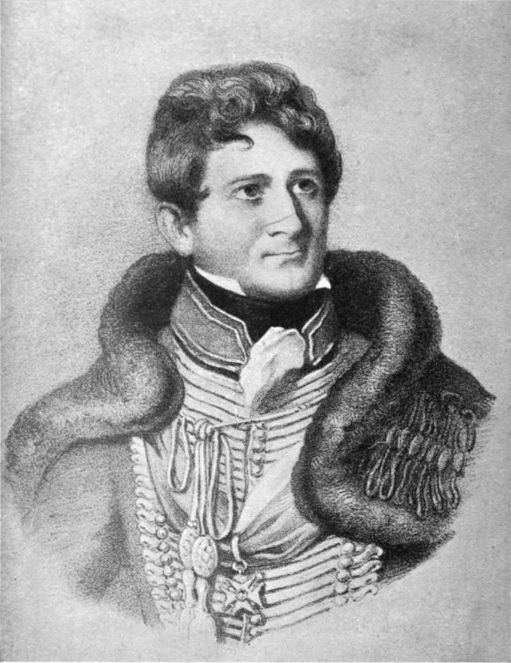
- Born: 5 September 1776; Dunkirk, France
- Died: 11 June 1835 (aged 58); Woolwich, England
- Education: High School, Edinburgh
- Military career
- Allegiance: United Kingdom
- Branch: British Army
- Service years: 1794–1835
- Rank: Colonel
- Unit: Royal Horse Artillery
- Conflicts: French Revolutionary Wars; Flanders Campaign; Battle of Tourcoing; Battle of Tournay; Battle of Boxtel; Anglo-Russian Invasion of Holland; Napoleonic Wars; British invasions of the River Plate; Peninsular War; Battle of San Millan-Osma; Battle of Vitoria; Siege of San Sebastián; Battle of the Bidassoa; Battle of Nivelle; Battle of the Nive; Passage of the Adour; Battle of Bayonne (WIA); Battle of Toulouse; Hundred Days; Battle of Waterloo
- Awards: Army Gold Cross

Colonel Sir Augustus Simon Frazer KCB FRS (5 September 1776 – 11 June 1835), commanded the artillery at the British invasions of the Río de la Plata (1807) and the Royal Horse Artillery on Wellington's staff in the Peninsular War, and later during the Waterloo Campaign.

== Family ==
He was born 5 September 1776 at Dunkirk, where his father, Andrew Frazer of the Royal Engineers, was Assistant Commissary in the demolition of the fortress. His mother was Charlotte, daughter of Stillingfleet Durnford and granddaughter of John Peter Desmaretz, both of the Ordnance Office. Frazer received his early education at the High School of Edinburgh, where he was a contemporary of Lord Brougham. He had only a sister, Maria Ernestine, who married and lived in Vienna. In 1809, Simon Frazer married Emma Lynn, daughter of James Lynn, Esq, of Woodbridge in Suffolk. They had two sons. The elder, Augustus Henry, was born in August 1810 and obtained a commission in the Royal Artillery He retired from service at the rank of second captain and died unmarried while travelling in Syria in July 1848. The younger son, Andrew James, born in October 1812, obtained a Lieutenant's Commission in the Rifle Corps, from which he retired, and he died, unmarried at Ramsgate in July

== Military service ==
Educated at the High School, Edinburgh, where he was a contemporary of Lord Brougham, Frazer joined the Royal Military Academy, at Woolwich, on 16 August 1790 as a gentleman cadet. On 18 September 1793, he was gazetted a second lieutenant in the Royal Artillery, and at the end of the year joined the Army in Flanders, under command of the Duke of York. In early 1794, he was promoted to First Lieutenant, and attached with 2 field guns to the 3rd Foot Guards (Grenadiers), where he served until the army returned to England in May 1795. During that time, he was present at several engagements, including the battles of Tournay and Boxtel. Upon return to England, he was appointed to the Royal Horse Artillery, and on 16 July 1799 received the rank of Captain Lieutenant. From August to late November, he took part in the Duke of York's expedition in Holland.

In 1803, Frazer received his rank of captain, and in 1807, embarked for South America to participate in General John Whitelock's expedition to Buenos Aires. Despite the disastrous results of this campaign, Frazer acquired experience and skill in his management of the transport and placement of the artillery. In 1811, he was assigned to the Duke of Wellington's army in the Peninsula, where he served at the battles of Salamanca and Osma and the Siege of Burgos. Later he was present at the Battle of Vitoria, for which he received a special notice from Sir Alexander Dickson, the overall commander of Artillery. Subsequently, he served at the blockade of Papeluna, and the Siege of San Sebastian. At Papeluna, Thomas Graham brought him to the notice of Wellington. At San Sebastian, he directed the fire from the flank, remarkable for its accuracy. He subsequently participated in the investment of Bayonne, at which he was wounded. At the conclusion of fighting at Toulouse, he returned to England, as a Lieutenant-Colonel, and received the Army Gold Medal, with one clasp for Vittoria, San Sebastian, Nivelle, Nive, and Toulouse. He was also invested as a Knight Commander of the Order of the Bath.

== Waterloo Campaign ==
In 1815, Frazer returned to command the Horse Artillery and was attached to Wellington's Headquarters. He was present at the Battle of Quatre Bras on 16 June, but his artillery did not actually arrive until after the fight. The artillery covered the retreat from Quatre Bras, delaying the French cavalry sufficiently to allow the infantry to withdraw. The Horse Artillery successfully dislodged the French from the woods surrounding Hougemont, without bringing the Allied troops under friendly fire. Despite the initial opposition of Wellington, he successfully substituted 9-pounders for 6-pounders with many of the troops, and formed one troop with howitzers. The 9-pounders inflicted heavier losses on the French advance, particularly with its case shot, than would have been inflicted with the lighter guns. Subsequent to the battle, he wrested from the Prussians the French guns that had been captured by the British, but which had been taken over with Prussian sentries.

== Later life ==
Upon returning to England after occupation duty, he was elected a Fellow of the Royal Society on 21 June 1816. He was appointed Director of the Royal Laboratory at Woolwich, where he died on 11 June 1835.

== Personal life ==
In 1809, Frazer married Emma, youngest daughter of James Lynn, of Woodbridge, in Suffolk, and the couple had two sons.

== Sources ==
- Dalton, Charles (1904). The Waterloo roll call. With biographical notes and anecdotes. London: Eyre and Spottiswoode.
- Frazer, Sir Augustus Simon (1859). Letters of Colonel Sir Augustus Simon Frazer, K.C.B. commanding the Royal horse artillery in the army under Wellington: Written during the peninsular and Waterloo campaigns. London: Longman, Brown, Green, Longmans, & Roberts.
