= Sir James Douglas, 1st Baronet =

Scottish Royal Navy Admiral (1703–1787)

Admiral Sir James Douglas Bt
- Born: 1703
- Died: 2 November 1787 (aged 83–84)
- Military career
- Allegiance: Kingdom of Great Britain
- Branch: Royal Navy
- Rank: Admiral of the White
- Commands: HMS Mermaid; HMS Vigilante; Newfoundland Station; Leeward Islands Station; Jamaica Station; Portsmouth Station
- Conflicts: French and Indian War

Viceregal styles of Sir James Douglas
- Reference style: His Excellency
- Spoken style: Your Excellency

Admiral Sir James Douglas, 1st Baronet (1703 – 2 November 1787) was a Scottish naval officer and Commodore of Newfoundland.

== Naval career ==
Douglas became a captain in the Royal Navy in 1744. In 1745 he commanded HMS Mermaid at Louisbourg and in 1746 he commanded HMS Vigilante at Louisbourg. In 1746 he was appointed Commodore, Newfoundland Station, by Vice-Admiral Isaac Townsend. (Note: The position of governor of the colony had temporarily lapsed after the departure of Richard Edwards and therefore Douglas was not a governor of the island. Also, no commodore or governor was sent in 1747, the next governor was Charles Watson in 1748.) He then served as a Member of Parliament for Orkney & Shetland from 1754 to 1768.

In 1757 Douglas served as a member of the court-martial which tried and convicted Admiral Byng and in 1759 he was knighted for his participation in the capture of Québec.

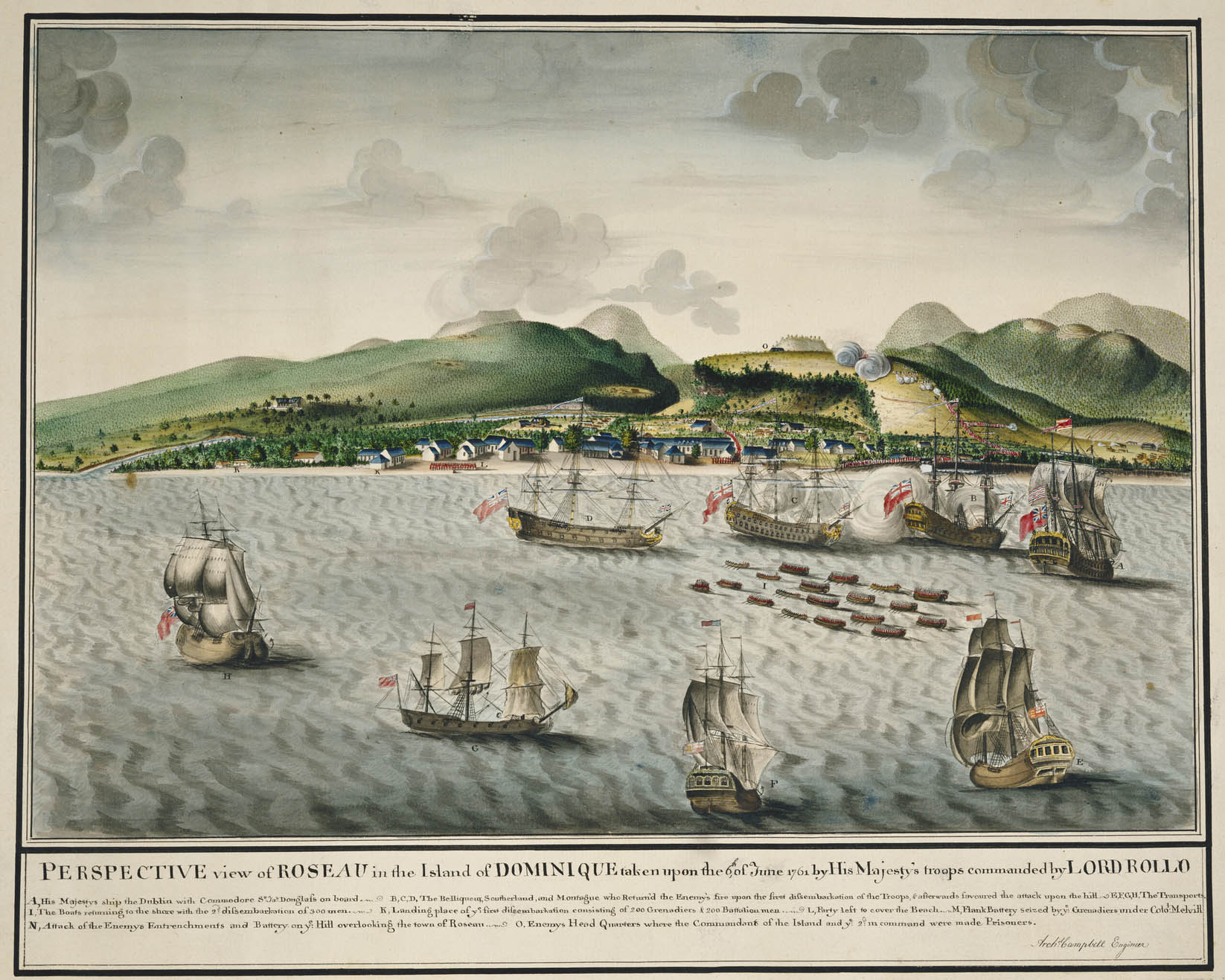
A view of the British invasion of Dominica, 6 June 1761, as drawn by Archibald Campbell, Royal Engineers.

He became commander-in-chief of the Leeward Islands Station and was commander of the squadron which captured Dominica in 1761. He served in the fleet under George Rodney which captured Martinique in February 1762 and then served in the fleet under George Pocock which captured Havana in August 1762. He became Commander-in-Chief, Jamaica Station, later in the year.

Promoted to vice-admiral in 1770, he became Commander-in-Chief, Portsmouth, in 1774 and was then promoted to admiral in 1778. In 1786 he was made a Baronet, of Maxwell, Roxburgh Baronetcy.

== Family ==
Douglas was the son of George Douglas, 7th laird of Friarshaw, Roxburghshire, and Elizabeth, daughter of Sir Patrick Scott, baronet, of Ancrum, also of Roxburghshire. This Douglas line descended from the Douglas of Cavers branch of the family, and were lawyers and merchants. They took the title Douglas of Friarshaw from the original seat of the family in the parish of Lilliesleaf.

Douglas was twice married: first in 1753 to Helen (d. 1766), daughter of Thomas Brisbane of Brisbane in Ayrshire; the couple had four sons, including Admiral James Douglas and three daughters. His second wife was Lady Helen Boyle, daughter of John Boyle, 2nd Earl of Glasgow, and Helenor, née Morison.

Sir George Douglas, 2nd Baronet, was a captain in the 25th Regiment of Foot and later commanded the Kelso Volunteers. He sold the old estate of Friarshaw in 1788 and became MP for Roxburgh.

== See also ==
- Great Britain in the Seven Years War
- Governors of Newfoundland
- List of people from Newfoundland and Labrador

== Notes ==
Parliament of Great Britain
Preceded by James Halyburton	Member of Parliament for Orkney and Shetland; 1754–1768	Succeeded by Thomas Dundas
Military offices
Preceded by John Moore	Commander-in-Chief, Leeward Islands Station; 1761–1762	Succeeded by Sir George Brydges Rodney
Preceded by Charles Holmes	Commander-in-Chief, Jamaica Station; 1762	Succeeded by Augustus Keppel
Preceded by Thomas Pye	Commander-in-Chief, Portsmouth; 1774–1777	Succeeded by Thomas Pye
Baronetage of Great Britain
New creation	Baronet (of Maxwell); 1786–1787	Succeeded by George Douglas
