= William Horneck =

William Horneck (1685–1746) was a British Army engineer of German descent.

== Life ==
The son of the German-born preacher Anthony Horneck, he learned military science under John Churchill and designed works in Britain, Newfoundland, Minorca and elsewhere. His final rank was captain and he was buried alongside his parents in Westminster Abbey: a tablet marks the spot. His son Kane William Horneck was also a military engineer.

== Sources ==
- Article title
