= Edward Sclater =

Edward Sclater (3 November 1623 – 1688 or 1689) was a Church of England priest, notable for his brief conversion to Roman Catholicism.

== Life ==
Studying at Merchant Taylors School and St John's College, Oxford, he graduated BA in 1644 and formed part of Oxford's Royalist garrison during the English Civil War. The Parliamentarian regime ejected him from his college in 1648 and he retired to a curacy in Berkshire, where he refused to take the 1649 'engagement'. He wrote to Charles II of England after the Restoration detailing his perceived persecution under the Commonwealth and gained an appointment as perpetual curate of St Mary's Church, Putney and the living of Esher, Surrey. When Charles' brother James II succeeded to the throne, Sclater converted to Roman Catholicism and in 1686 published Nubes Testium, or a Collection of the Primitive Fathers and Consensus Veterum, or the Reasons of Edw. Sclater, Minister of Putney, for his Conversion to the Catholic Faith and Communion to justify this decision. The same year James granted him special dispensation to retain both his livings at Putney and Esher, to take on a curate, to run at least one school and to receive "boarders, tablers, or sojourners"

Sclater's books were attacked by Edward Gee in Veteres Vindicati (1687) and An Answer to the Compiler of the Nubes Testium (1688) and upon the Glorious Revolution of 1689 he publicly recanted at the Savoy Chapel and was received back into the Church of England - Anthony Horneck wrote an account of the recantation. Sclater retired from his school and his livings to live as a private individual near 'Exeter Change' in London. He had two sons:

- Edward (1655–1710); fellow and bursar of Merton College, Oxford; rector of Gamlingay, Cambridgeshire (1685-1710); frequently mentioned in Wood's Life and Times.
- George; rector of Hayes in 1688, and Westerham, Kent, in 1696.

== Works ==
- Nubes Testium, or a Collection of the Primitive Fathers (1686)
- Consensus Veterum, or the Reasons of Edw. Sclater, Minister of Putney, for his Conversion to the Catholic Faith and Communion (1686)
- Grammar, attributed to him by Wood, unpublished
- Vocabulary, attributed to him by Wood, unpublished

== Sources ==
- This article incorporates text from a publication now in the public domain: "Sclater, Edward". Dictionary of National Biography. London: Smith, Elder & Co. 1885–1900.
