= Langton Hall, Little Langton =

House in Little Langton, North Yorkshire, England

Coordinates: 54°21′08″N 1°32′03″W

Langton Hall is a historic building in Little Langton, a village in North Yorkshire, England.

The building was constructed in about 1770, for Leonard Smelt. It was enlarged between 1850 and 1860, but in 1960 it was restored to its original form, and was refronted. The house was grade II* listed in 1986.

The house is built of red brick with Westmorland slate roofs. The main range has two storeys and a basement, seven bays, a dentilled brick course, a machicolated parapet, and a hipped roof. A stone staircase with railings leads up to the doorway that has a fanlight and side lights, and above it is a Venetian window. The other windows are sashes with flat brick arches. On each end is a full-height bow window. The range is connected at each end by a curved loggia to wings projecting at right angles. The loggias have Roman Doric columns on plinths carrying a frieze and a cornice. The wings have two storeys and eight bays, and contain casement windows.

== See also ==
- Grade II* listed buildings in North Yorkshire (district)
- Listed buildings in Little Langton
