= John Peter Desmaretz =

British civil and military engineer

John Peter Desmaretz (c. 1686 – 1768) was a British civil and military engineer. His projects included a new entrance to Shoreham-by-Sea's harbour (1753), powder and horse mills in Faversham (1755-1763) and for gun batteries at vulnerable points on the coasts of Kent and Sussex (1759). He also advised on modifications to Edward Gatton's plans for Ramsgate harbour (1749-1772).

== Life ==
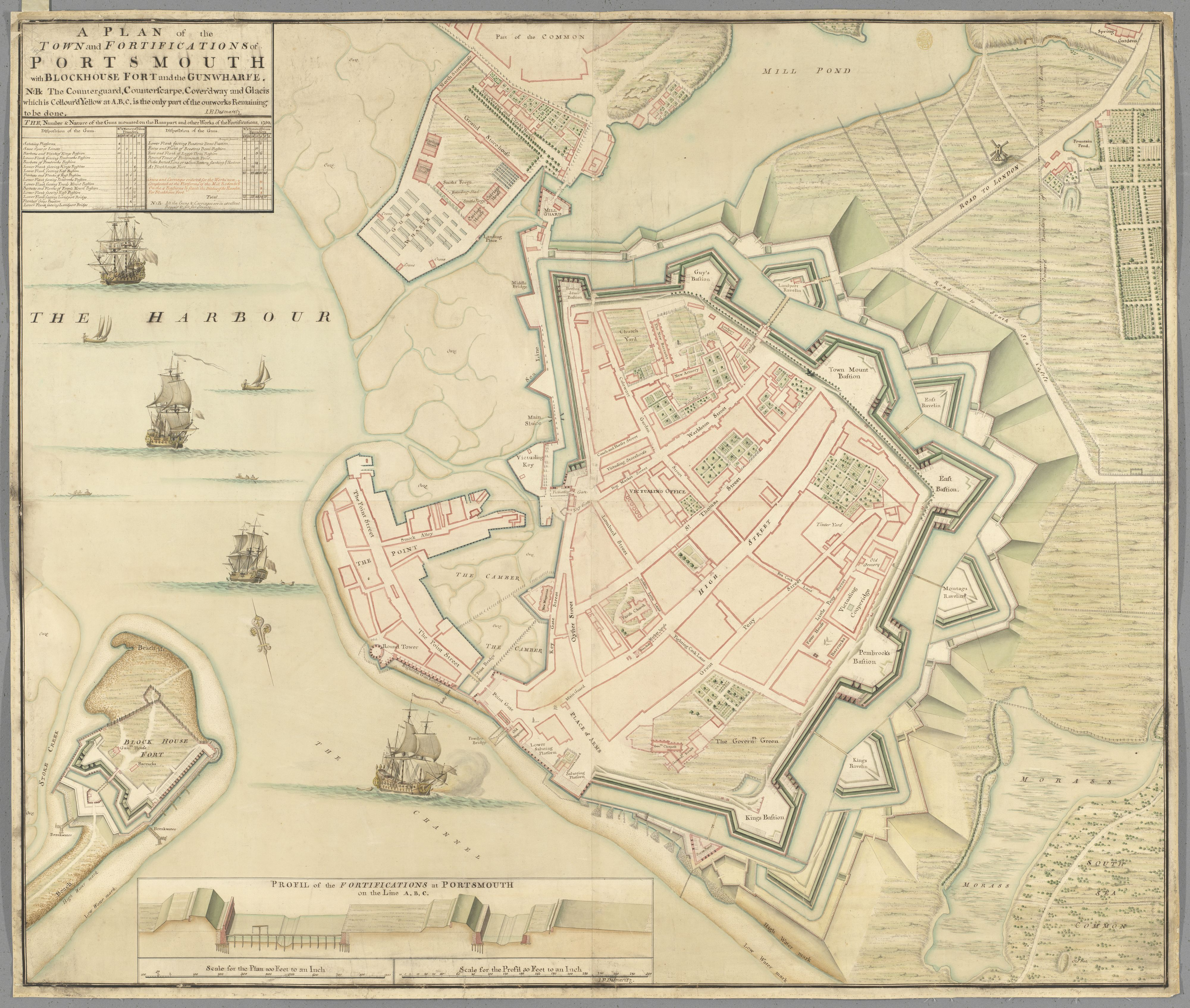
'Plan of the town and fortifications of Portsmouth, with the Blockhouse Fort and the Gunwharfe' by J. P. Desmaretz, 1750.

His epitaph by his daughter Mary reads:

though born a foreigner he early adopted every sentiment of civil and religious liberty and exerted his active abilities for the service of this nation in quality of an engineer

This and his surname imply a Huguenot origin, though nothing certain is known of his life before he joined the army of John Churchill, 1st Duke of Marlborough in 1709. He remained in British service at the war's end in 1713, working with John Armstrong to demolish the port at Dunkirk and survey the coastline between Gravelines and Ostend. He produced a chart of the River Medway in Kent in 1724 and the following year was taken on by the Board of Ordnance to be a draughtsman at the Tower of London. There he and trained the next generation of military draughtsmen, including Leonard Smelt, William Twiss, Andrew Frazer and the Durnfords. He also produced estimates, charts and reports and took part in every major Ordnance project in southern England at the time, including his survey of Harwich Harbour (1732), the Brompton Lines around Chatham Dockyard (1756) and alterations at Dover Castle (1756) which cost £3,658 and employed 734 men. He also built a west porch for the Ordnance's magazine in Greenwich in 1733 and reported on repairs to its gunpowder store in Woolwich as well as working on a planned magazine in Jamaica, both in 1743.

In 1747, he designed Fort Cumberland to defend Langstone Harbour. He became overseer at Portsmouth Dockyard in 1748 and nine years later led the construction of the Gosport Lines to protect it and Priddy's Hard in 1757. By 1758, he had also accumulated the posts of Clerk to the Fortifications, Architect to the Ordnance Board and Master Draughtsman - these three posts brought him a total annual salary of £280. He mapped Portsmouth and its harbour, dockyard and defences, including one in 1762 for repairs after extraordinary winds and tides caused severe damage to the harbour. He later became the Dockyard's Commanding Engineer (1768).

In the meantime, he had written a report and estimates for the large magazine at Purfleet in 1755, for fortifying Senegal in 1758 and for a military hospital in Sheerness in 1762-1763. Britain regained Dunkirk in 1763 and three years later Desmaretz, Frazer and William Roy drew up plans for two new channels at Mardyke. He never held military rank in the Royal Engineers, but was made a lieutenant colonel of artillery in 1761. He died in Dunkirk but his body was brought back to Portsmouth, where it was interred alongside his wife in Portsmouth Garrison Church. His daughter Mary erected an epitaph to him - she married Stillingfleet Durnford, Clerk of Deliveries in the Ordnance's civil branch, and with him had Desmaretz (an engineer in America) and Charlotte (who married Frazer). Frazer and Charlotte's son Augustus Simon Frazer commanded the horse artillery under Wellington during the Peninsular War.

== Publications ==
- 1755: A Plan for Making a Harbour at Ramsgate, jointly with Sir Peircy Brett
- 1755: Report and Estimate Subjoined, Relating to the Harbour of Ramsgate, jointly with Sir Peircy Brett.

== Sources ==
- 'John Peter Desmaretz', in A Biographical Dictionary of Civil Engineers in Great Britain and Ireland (London: Institution of Civil Engineers, 2002)
- http://discovery.nationalarchives.gov.uk/details/r/D504040
