= Leonard Smelt (British Army officer) =

British Army officer

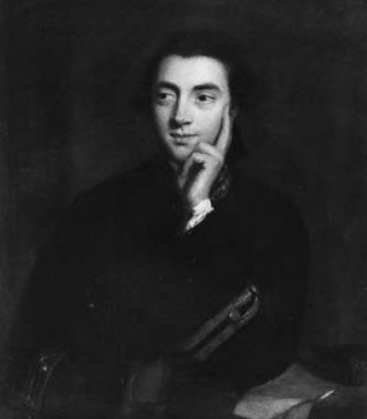
Leonard Smelt by Joshua Reynolds, 1755 (private collection).

Leonard Smelt (c. 1719 – 2 September 1800) was a British Army officer. He also served as sub-governor to Frederick, Duke of York and the future George IV.

== Life ==
=== Early military service ===
He was the eldest son of William Smelt (1690 – 14 September 1755) of Leases in Kirkby Fleetham, MP for Northallerton in the parliament of 1734. Leonard's first appointment was as a clerk in the Ordnance Office in June 1734 before becoming a cadet gunner in the new Royal Artillery on 1 January 1739. This did not take up all of his time and he was granted permission to attend the drawing room at the Tower of London, where he trained under Clement Lempriere and John Peter Desmaretz and became a skilled military artist and plan-maker. The Master General of the Ordnance, the Duke of Montagu, assigned him to Colonel Thomas Lascelles, chief engineer at Portsmouth Dockyard, in April 1741 and only two months later Lascelles recommended that Montagu grant him the rank of practitioner engineer. On 13 August 1741 he was given a post at the Tower of London by General John Armstrong, Surveyor-General of the Ordnance and Chief Royal Engineer. This post lasted almost a year before he was assigned to the British force in Flanders on 19 June the following year, becoming part of the ordnance train there and fighting at Dettingen and Fontenoy. He also gained promotion to engineer extraordinary on 8 March 1744, leapfrogging the intermediate rank of sub-engineer. In 1745 he was taken on by Captain Thomas, Royal Engineers, a subordinate of the Duke of Cumberland, and together they repaired and extended Vilvorden Castle's fortifications – they produced a plan of the new scheme which is now in the British Library.

=== Military surveyor ===
At the end of 1745 he returned to England but was soon sent to join the reserves of the force opposing the 1745 Rising in northern England. On 3 January 1747 he was promoted to engineer in ordinary, at which rank he surveyed the Military Road between Carlisle and Newcastle-upon-Tyne and led its construction. His next posting was to report back on the defences in Newfoundland in 1751 and his manuscript report (now in the British Library) advised against fortifying the poor position at Placentia. He returned to England the following year and was sent to Plymouth, from which he worked up the notes of his friend Kane William Horneck (died 1753) on the defences of Antigua after the latter's premature death. He was painted by Joshua Reynolds in August 1755 after meeting the painter via Hannah, Kane Horneck's widow. He was promoted to captain in 1757 and sent back north, this time to improve the defences of Clifford's Fort and Tynemouth Castle.

=== Later life ===
George II died in 1760 and ten years later Smelt was introduced to his successor George III. The introduction was affected by Robert D'Arcy, 4th Earl of Holderness, a mutual friend, and George took a liking to Smelt despite their different politics – Smelt supported the Whigs. Holderness was made governor to George's two eldest sons in April 1771 and gained Smelt the post of deputy governor. They both fell from their positions ten years later – Smelt refused a pension, but did gain the post of Deputy Ranger of Richmond Park and remained an intimate of George and his wife Queen Charlotte. Smelt also sent his nephew Cornelius to a military academy.

In retirement Smelt got to know several literary figures in London, including Samuel Johnson, Oliver Goldsmith, David Garrick, Edmund Burke, Elizabeth Montagu, Hannah More, Mrs Delaney, Sir Lucas Pepys, Horace Walpole, Charles Burney, Frances Burney, The Hon. Mrs Boscawen and others. He lived at Kew from 1787 to 1789, meaning he frequently met with Frances Burney and the King during the latter's first bout of 'madness' at Kew Palace in winter 1788–1789. His wife was a niece of lieutenant general Joshua Guest of Lydgate in Lightcliffe, Yorkshire – they had two daughters, Anne and Dorothy. In 1792, just after his wife's death, Smelt left Kew and returned to Yorkshire, dying at Langton Hall, Little Langton in 1800.
