= Kane William Horneck =

British officer (1726–1753)

Kane William Horneck (1726–1753) was an officer in the Royal Engineers.

== Life ==
He was a son of William Horneck and a grandson of Anthony Horneck. He married Hannah Muggles (1727–1803) from Devon and they had issue:

- Catherine (1750–1799); married satirist Henry William Bunbury
- Mary (1753–1840); in 1770 traveled to France with Oliver Goldsmith and his family, to whom she was introduced by Joshua Reynolds; married Colonel Francis Edward Gwyn in 1778

He was close friends with Edmund Burke, who on Kane's death became his daughters' guardian. Just before his death Horneck had inspected the defences of Antigua - after his death his friend and fellow engineer officer Leonard Smelt worked up Horneck's sketches and memoranda into a full report. Hannah was also a friend of Samuel Johnson and Joshua Reynolds, who painted Hannah and both her daughters.
