= Anthony Horneck =

German clergyman and scholar

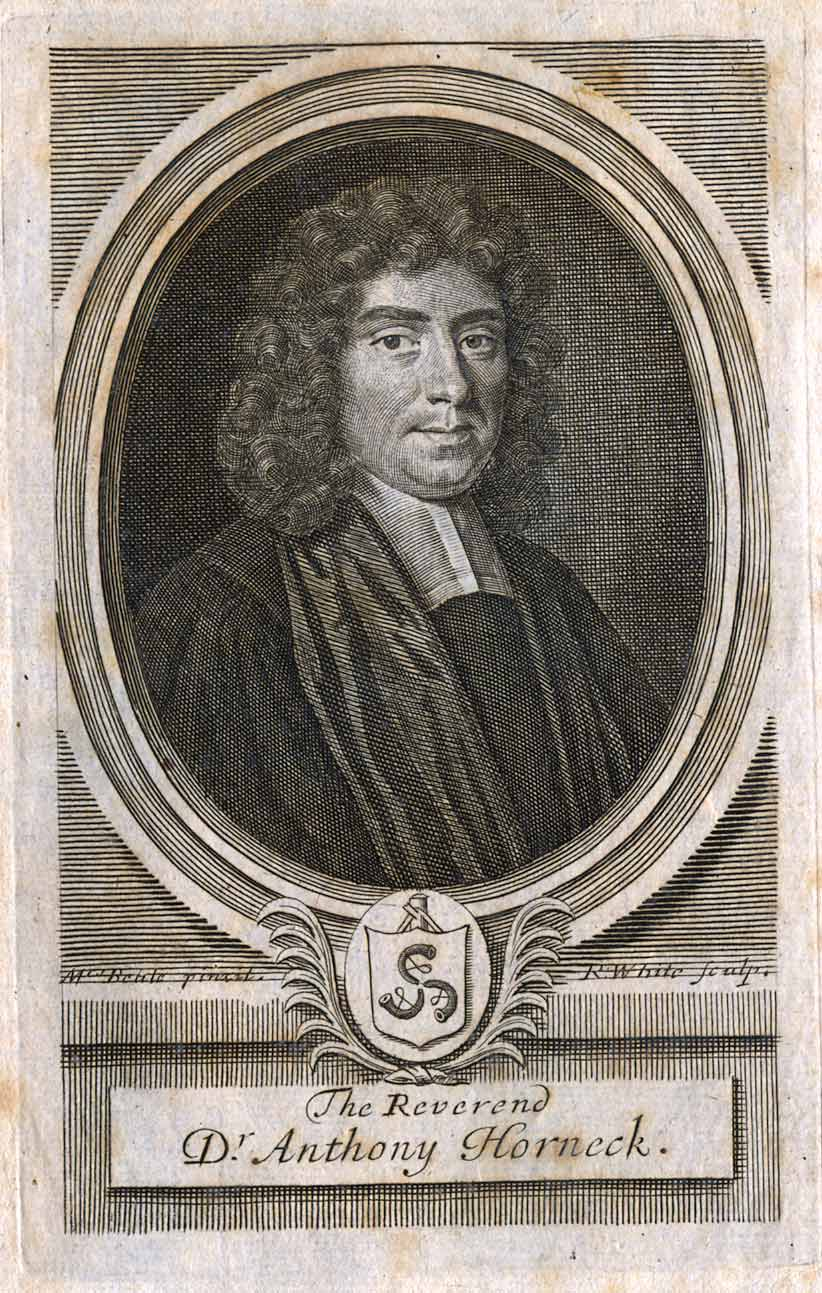
Anthony Horneck

Anthony Horneck FRS (German: Anton Horneck; 1641–1697) was a German Protestant clergyman and scholar who made his career in England. He became an influential evangelical figure in London from the later 1670s, in partnership with Richard Smithies, curate of St Giles Cripplegate.

== Life ==
Horneck was born in 1641 at Bacharach, where his father was 'recorder' of the town, and brought him up as a Protestant. He studied at Heidelberg University under Friedrich Spanheim the Younger, then professor of divinity. He came to England about 1661, and became a member of The Queen's College, Oxford, 24 December 1663. There he was made chaplain by Thomas Barlow as Provost, and afterwards bishop of Lincoln. He was incorporated MA 15 March 1664.

He was presented by Lincoln College to the vicarage of All Saints, Oxford. In 1665 he became tutor to Christopher Monck, Lord Torrington, son of George Monck, 1st Duke of Albemarle The duke gave him the living of Dolton in Devon, and procured for him a prebend at Exeter Cathedral, where he was admitted 13 June 1670. In 1669 he visited Germany, and was received at the court of the Charles I Louis, Elector Palatine. In 1671 he was appointed preacher at the Savoy Hospital, and soon afterwards married.

He became so popular as a preacher to overflowing congregations that it was said that his parish extended from Whitechapel to Whitehall, reported by Richard Kidder; and John Evelyn's Diary (18 March 1683) calls him 'a most pathetic preacher and a person of saint-like life.' He resigned Dolton on obtaining the Savoy preachership; he had to hire a house near his church, became the father of four children, and gave to charity with an open hand. Kidder also says that he injured any chance of preferment by the plainness of his reproofs to great men. When John Tillotson was consulted by the Countess of Bedford on the appointment to the church of Covent Garden. Horneck's name had been suggested, but he was rejected on account of his unpopularity in the parish. He took the oaths to William III and Mary II; Kidder states that he lost many patrons at this time.

He further gave offence by his share in founding one of the Societies for the Reformation of Manners. Gilbert Burnet says that Horneck and William Beveridge were leaders in this movement just before the Glorious Revolution.

He became a Fellow of the Royal Society in 1669 and received the DD degree from Cambridge in 1681. In January 1689 Horneck was appointed one of eight chaplains to King William. Edward Russell recommended him to the Queen, who obtained for him a promise from Tillotson of the next vacant prebend at Westminster Abbey. He was accordingly installed 1 July 1693. He resigned his prebend at Exeter, but was admitted to a prebend at Wells Cathedral, which required no residence, by his friend Bishop Kidder, 28 September 1694.

== Works ==
A student of the Bible and religious literature, and a casuist consulted in cases of conscience, Horneck was well read in Arabic, Hebrew, and rabbinical literature. He wrote little in controversy, but took an anti-Catholic line during the reign of James II. His books are mainly devotional, and went through many editions down to 1730; some reprints appeared from 1846.

His works are:

- The Great Law of Consideration … wherein the nature, usefulness, and absolute necessity of Consideration, to a … religious life, are laid open, 1676; 11th edit. 1729.
- Letter to a Lady, revolted from the Romish Church (given by Kidder, not in the British Museum).
- The happy Ascetick; or the Best Exercise …; to which is added, A Letter to a Person of Quality concerning the Holy Lives of the Primitive Christians, 1681; 6th edit. 1724, for which William Hogarth engraved a frontispiece (The "Letter" was reprinted in 1849, and in the Churchman's Library, 1853).
- Delight and Judgment; or the Great Assize …, 1683 (where the first title appears to have been the Sirenes; see Short Account); 3rd edit. 1705.
- The Fire of the Altar; or certain Directions how to raise the Soul into holy Flames before, at, and after the receiving of the … Lord's Supper. Appended is A Dialogue betwixt a Christian and his own Conscience, 1683; 13th edit. 1718.
- The Exercise of Prayer (supplementary to the last), 1685.
- First Fruits of Reason, 1685.
- The Crucified Jesus; or a full account of the … Sacrament of the Lord's Supper, 1686; 7th edit. 1727.
- Questions and Answers concerning the two Religions, 1688.
- Advice to Parents, 1690.
- An Answer to the Soldier's Question (mentioned by Kidder).
- Several Sermons upon the Fifth of St. Matthew, being part of Christ's Sermon on the Mount, 2nd edit. 1706, with life by Kidder.

Horneck published separate sermons. He translated from the French An Antidote against a Careless Indifferency … in 1683; and supervised a translation of Royaumont's History of the Old and New Testaments, 1690. He added accounts of witchcraft in Sweden to the later editions of the Sadducismus Triumphatus of Joseph Glanvill, and wrote a preface to Glanvill's Remains, 1681. He attended Borosky and Stern, convicted of the murder of Thomas Thynne in 1682, and with Gilbert Burnet published an account of their confessions and behaviour. On 5 May 1689, Edward Sclater, vicar of Putney, who had gone over to Rome under James II, recanted publicly at the Savoy, and Horneck published an account of the affair.

== Family ==
Three of his four children survived him:

- Philip; abused in the Dunciad
- William, army officer, father of Kane William Horneck
- A daughter; married Robert Barnevald then Captain Warre.

== Death ==
Anthony Horneck died 31 January 1697, after much suffering from kidney stones, and was buried in Westminster Abbey.
