= John Scott-Waring =

English political agent of Warren Hastings, publicist and Member of Parliament

John Scott-Waring (at first John Scott) (1747–1819) was an English political agent of Warren Hastings, publicist and Member of Parliament.

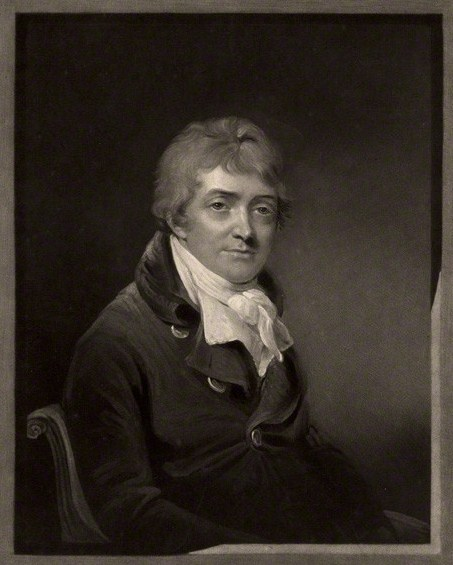
John Scott-Waring, 1802 engraving

== Early life ==
Born at Shrewsbury, his father was Jonathan Scott of Shrewsbury (died August 1778), who married Mary, second daughter of Humphrey Sandford of the Isle of Rossall, Shropshire. The second son, Richard, rose to the rank of lieutenant-colonel, and served under Sir Eyre Coote against Hyder Ali Khan. The third son was Jonathan Scott the orientalist. The fourth son, Henry, became commissioner of police at Bombay.

John, the eldest son, entered the service of the East India Company about 1766, and became a major in the Bengal division of its forces.

== In India ==
Scott had been in India for twelve years before he knew Warren Hastings more than casually. They became close, and he was one of the intermediaries who, in November 1779, patched up a temporary reconciliation between Hastings and Philip Francis. In May 1780 he was appointed to command a battalion of sepoys.

== Political agent in London ==
Scott was sent by Hastings to England as his political agent, and he arrived in London on 17 December 1781. Scott was profuse in his expenditure for his patron.

From 1784 to 1790 Scott sat in parliament as member for West Looe, and in 1790 he was returned for Stockbridge in Hampshire. A petition was presented against him, and in February 1793 a prosecution for bribery seemed imminent, but the matter fell through.

== Impeachment of Hastings ==
The charges against Warren Hastings might have been allowed to drop, but Scott reminded Edmund Burke on the first day of the session of 1786 of the notice which he had given before the preceding recess of bringing them before parliament. Scott asked Burke to name the first day that was practicable; Burke opened the subject on 17 February. Fanny Burney (Diary, ed. 1842, iv. 74–5) commented on Scott "skipping backwards and forwards like a grasshopper".

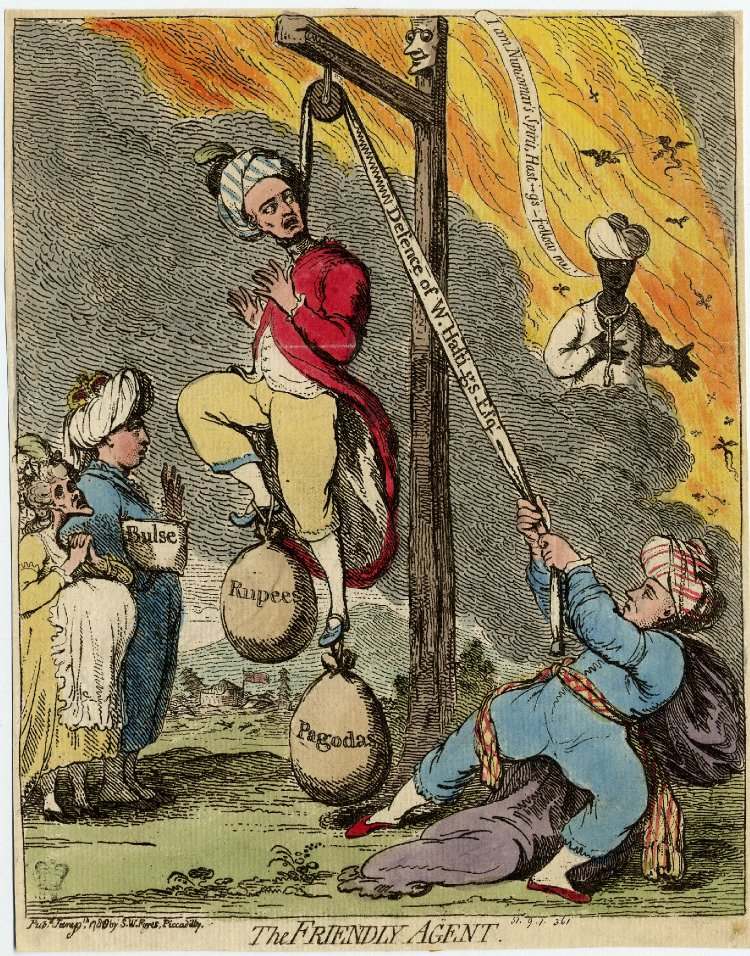
The Friendly Agent, satirical print by James Gillray. Hastings hanged by the efforts of Scott, his political agent.

== Later life ==
In 1798, by the death of his cousin, Richard Hill Waring, Scott came into the Waring estates in Cheshire, which he sold in 1800 to Peel and Yates (the company of Sir Robert Peel, 1st Baronet) for £80,000. He then assumed the name and arms of Waring. A year or two later he bought Peterborough House at Parson's Green, Fulham, and gathered around him varied company: royal princes, politicians, wits, and actresses.

Scott-Waring died at Half Moon Street, Piccadilly, London, on 5 May 1819.

== Works ==
In 1782 Scott published, in the interests of Hastings, his Short Review of Transactions in Bengal during the last Ten Years, and, two years later, his Conduct of his Majesty's late Ministers considered, 1784 (in it he dealt with the payments which he had made to the newspapers for the insertion of letters in defence of Hastings). Letters, paragraphs, puffs, and squibs were attributed to him.

During the course of the impeachment (1788–1795) many letters, speeches, and pamphlets emanated from Scott. Scott also wrote:

- Observations on Sheridan's pamphlet, contrasting the two bills for the better government of India, 1788; 3rd ed. 1789.
- Observations on Belsham's “Memoirs of the reign of George III,” 1796.
- Seven Letters to the People of Great Britain by a Whig, 1789. In this he discussed the questions arising out of the king's illness.

A memoir of Hastings by Scott is in William Seward's Biographiana, ii. 610–28.

=== Christian mission controversy ===
On the subject of Christian missions in India Scott-Waring published Observations on the present State of the East India Company (anonymous, 1807 four editions). It contributed to a long-running debate on the religious toleration policy of the East India Company, in the face of missionary efforts. Thomas Twining (1776–1861), son of Richard Twining, wrote from 1795 against "interfering" in India with Christian missions. The year 1808 saw active controversy on the propagation on Christianity, in which Andrew Fuller and John Owen (1766–1822) had become involved, with Scott-Waring replying to Owen. When John Weyland wrote an open letter to Sir Hugh Inglis in 1811, Scott-Waring replied to it.

A Vindication of the Hindoos from the expressions of Dr. Claudius Buchanan, in two parts by "a Bengal Officer" (1808), was attributed to Scott-Waring (DNB first edition). It was in fact by Charles Stuart.

== Family ==
Scott was three times married.

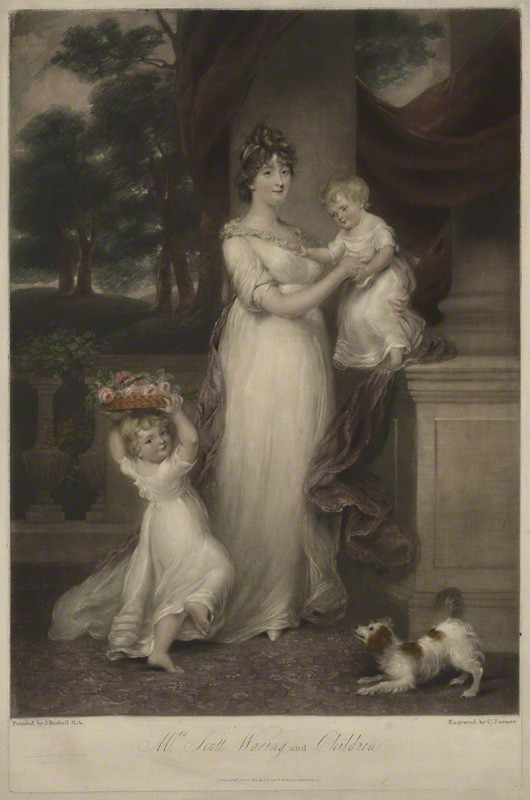
Maria Scott-Waring, 1804 engraving by Charles Turner after John Russell

1. His first wife, who brought him a fortune, was Elizabeth, daughter of Alexander Blackrie. She was born on 19 April 1746, and died 26 October 1796, being buried in Bromley churchyard, under a marble monument, with a long epitaph. She was the mother of two sons—Edward, a civil servant in Bengal; and Charles, who died young—and of two daughters, the elder of whom, Anna Maria, married John Reade of Ipsden House, Oxfordshire, was mother of Charles Reade and Edward Anderdon Reade, and died 9 August 1863, aged 90; the younger, Eliza Sophia, married the Rev. George Stanley Faber.
2. Waring's second wife was Maria, daughter and heiress of Jacob Hughes of Cashel.
3. Waring's third wife was Harriet Pye Esten, a widowed actress.
