= List of keepers and rangers of Richmond Park =

This article is a list of the keepers and rangers of Richmond Park, initially of the "New Park" formed in 1625 by Charles I.

== Keepers ==
- 1637–1649 Jerome Weston, 2nd Earl of Portland

== Rangers ==
- 1660–1673 Sir Lionel Tollemache and his wife Elizabeth, Countess of Dysart (Elizabeth alone in her own right after Lionel's death in 1669)
- 1673–1682 John Maitland, 1st Duke of Lauderdale, Elizabeth's second husband
- 1683–1711 Laurence Hyde, 1st Earl of Rochester
- 1711–1727 Henry Hyde, 2nd Earl of Rochester, the 1st Earl's son
- 1727–1751 Robert Walpole, 2nd Earl of Orford, son of Sir Robert Walpole, British Prime Minister
- 1751–1761 Princess Amelia, daughter of George II
- 1761–1792 John Stuart, 3rd Earl of Bute, tutor and prime minister to George III
- 1792–1814 George III
- 1814–1835 Princess Elizabeth, George III's daughter
- 1835–1850 Prince Adolphus, Duke of Cambridge, George III's son
- 1850–1857 Princess Mary, Duchess of Gloucester and Edinburgh, George III's daughter
- 1857–1904 George, 2nd Duke of Cambridge, Adolphus's son

== Deputy Rangers ==
- 1761–? Sidney Meadows

Sidney Meadows was promoted to this office in 1761 when John Stuart, 3rd Earl of Bute, who was about to become Prime Minister of Great Britain, was Ranger. At some point Sidney's brother Philip Meadows took over; Philip is recorded as holding the office in 1772 and until his death in 1781.

- 1772?–1781 Philip Meadows
- 1781–1800 Leonard Smelt
- 1813–? Lord Sidmouth

Since 1904 the park has been managed by central government and is currently the responsibility of The Royal Parks.

== See also ==
- Park ranger

== Sources ==
- Rabbitts, Paul A (2014). Richmond Park: From Medieval Pasture to Royal Park. Amberley Publishing. ISBN 9781445618562, pp. 22–24
