= Listed buildings in Little Langton =

Little Langton is a civil parish in the county of North Yorkshire, England. It contains five listed buildings that are recorded in the National Heritage List for England. Of these, one is listed at Grade II*, the middle of the three grades, and the others are at Grade II, the lowest grade. The parish contains the hamlet of Little Langton and the surrounding area. The most important building in the parish is Langton Hall, which is listed, together with three associated structures, and the other listed building is a farmhouse.

== Key ==
Grade	Criteria
II*	Particularly important buildings of more than special interest
II	Buildings of national importance and special interest

== Buildings ==
Name and location	Photograph	Date	Notes	Grade
Sweden Sykes; 54.36250°N 1.51110°W		17th century	The farmhouse is in red brick with stepped eaves and a tile roof. There are two storeys, and three bays, a single-storey bay on the left, and a central rear wing. On the front is a doorway, the ground floor windows are casements with flat brick arches, and in the upper floor and the left bay are horizontally-sliding sash windows.	II
Langton Hall; 54.35214°N 1.53429°W	—	c. 1770	A large house in red brick with Westmorland slate roofs. The main range has two storeys and a basement, seven bays, a dentilled brick course, a machicolated parapet, and a hipped roof. A stone staircase with railings leads up to the doorway that has a fanlight and side lights, and above it is a Venetian window. The other windows are sashes with flat brick arches. On each end is a full-height bow window. The range is connected at each end by a curved loggia to wings projecting at right angles. The loggias have Roman Doric columns on plinths carrying a frieze and a cornice. The wings have two storeys and eight bays, and contain casement windows.	II*
Gateway east of Langton Hall; 54.35352°N 1.52702°W		Late 18th century	The gate piers flanking the entrance to the drive are in stone and square, and each has a chamfered plinth, a cornice and a ball finial. The gates are in wrought iron, they are scalloped and have plain mid-rail and spiked bars.	II
Hall Lodge, East; 54.36005°N 1.50417°W		Late 18th century	The lodge is stuccoed, and has a pyramidal Welsh slate roof. There is one storey, one bay, and a square plan. On the road front is a doorway, and in the left return is a casement window, both in recessed aches with impost bands.	II
Hall Lodge, West; 54.36014°N 1.50427°W		Late 18th century	The lodge is stuccoed, and has a hipped Welsh slate roof. There is one storey, three bays, and a T-shaped plan with the middle bay projecting as a wing towards the road. The doorway in the wing has a fanlight, and is in a recessed arch. The windows are casements in recessed arches with impost bands.	II
