= Little Langton =

Hamlet in North Yorkshire, England

Coordinates: 54°21′13″N 1°31′36″W

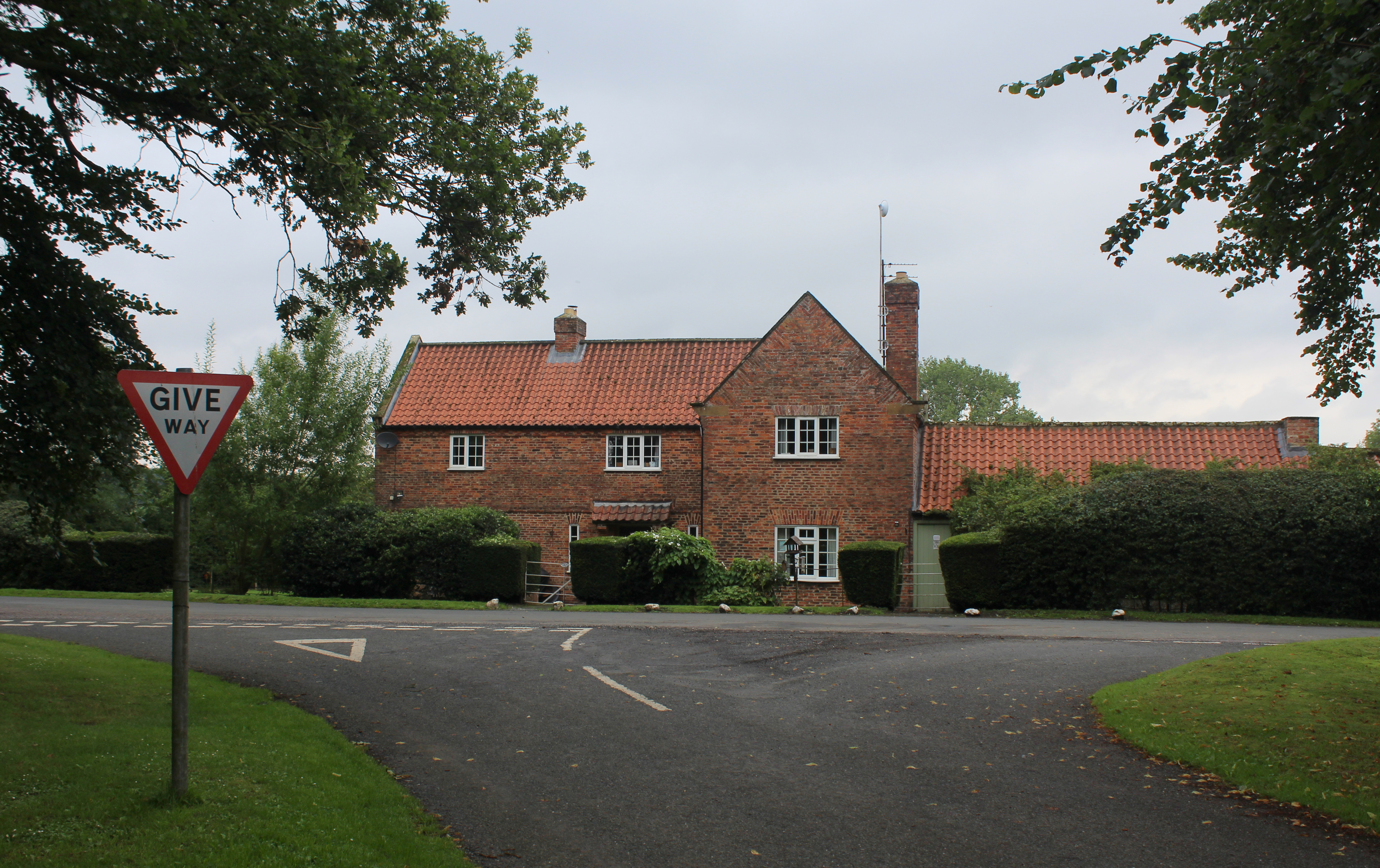
- Road junction at Prospect House

- Location within North Yorkshire
- Population: 50
- OS grid reference: SE305945
- Civil parish: Little Langton
- Unitary authority: North Yorkshire
- Ceremonial county: North Yorkshire
- Region: Yorkshire and the Humber
- Country: England
- Sovereign state: United Kingdom
- Post town: NORTHALLERTON
- Postcode district: DL7
- Police: North Yorkshire
- Fire: North Yorkshire
- Ambulance: Yorkshire
- UK Parliament: Richmond and Northallerton

Little Langton is a hamlet and civil parish in North Yorkshire, England. The population of the hamlet was estimated at 50 in 2015. As the population remained less than 100 at the 2011 census, details were included in the civil parish of Thrintoft.

From 1974 to 2023 it was part of the Hambleton District, it is now administered by the unitary North Yorkshire Council.

The grade II* listed Langton Hall was built in about 1770.

== See also ==
- Listed buildings in Little Langton
