= Joshua Guest =

English lieutenant-general

Lieutenant-General Joshua Guest
- Born: 1660
- Died: 14 October 1747 (aged 86–87); Brook Street, London
- Burial place: Westminster Abbey
- Spouse: Sarah
- Relatives: Mary Guest
- Military career
- Allegiance: British
- Branch: Army
- Rank: Lieutenant-General
- Unit: 3rd Hussars
- Commands: Carpenter's dragoons
- Conflicts: Battle of Almanza

Joshua Guest (1660 – 14 October 1747) was an English lieutenant-general.

== Early life ==
Guest was a Yorkshireman of obscure origin. His mother was Mary Guest, afterwards Smith, and he was a son by a former marriage, or before she was married at all. His epitaph in Westminster Abbey shows that he was born in 1660, and began his military service in 1685. The first entry of his name in existing War Office records is 24 February 1704, when he was appointed cornet in Captain Henry Hunt's troop of Colonel George Carpenter's dragoons.

== Military career ==
The whole of Guest's service as a commissioned regimental officer was passed in Carpenter's, afterwards Honeywood's, afterwards Bland's dragoons (later the 3rd Hussars). The regiment was raised in 1685, and was in the camp on Hounslow Heath. It fought with distinction under King William III in the Irish and Flanders campaigns; part of it was in the Cádiz expedition in 1702; and it also served in Spain in 1707–1708, and suffered heavily at the battle of Almanza, after which it was sent home to be reformed. Guest appears to have commanded Carpenter's dragoons in England and Scotland for many years.

He was in Scotland in 1715–1716, and commanded a party of dragoons which pursued and overthrew Jacobite fugitives at Perth 21 January 1716. The Lockhart Papers give a story, claimed to be direct from Guest, relating to the period of the Spanish invasion of Scotland in 1719. At the time Guest was with two or three troops of dragoons quartered in Staffordshire or Warwickshire. There he is said to have received letters, signed by George I, directing him in case of disorder 'to burn, shoot, or destroy without asking questions, for which and all that he should do contrary to the law in execution of these orders he thereby previously indemnified him.' The temper of the district was Jacobite, and that Guest communicated the orders to leading gentry with an appeal to them to keep the peace. The district remained undisturbed.

He was one of the commissioners appointed to inquire into the Glasgow riots in 1725; he became a brigadier-general 24 November 1735, and major-general 2 July 1739. He appears also to have been barrack-master for North Britain. His regiment went to Flanders in 1742, but he apparently did not accompany it.

== The 1745 Rebellion ==
In 1745 Guest was retired on half-pay of a regimental lieutenant-colonel. He became a lieutenant-general the same year, and was sent from London to replace Lieutenant-general Preston as deputy-governor of Edinburgh Castle. Under his command were two regiments of dragoons (Gardiner's and Hamilton's) plus the Town Guard.

Upon learning of the landing of Charles Edward Stuart and the rallying of his Jacobite supporters, Guest was ordered to send ships to bring Sir John Cope and his troops from Inverness in the north, to reinforce Edinburgh. However Charles and his growing army approached the city before this could be done. Gardiner's Dragoons had fallen back before the rebels before joining with Hamilton's regiment near Edinburgh at Guest's suggestion to await Cope's reinforcements. In the face of the rapidly advancing Jacobite force the dragoons under Brigadier Thomas Fowke retired to Prestonpans. This left General Guest to hold Edinburgh Castle with a garrison of only 600, consisting mainly of the newly raised Edinburgh Regiment, remnants of the dispersed Town Guard and volunteers.

Varying accounts are given of his conduct when Edinburgh was in the hands of the rebels. According to some he was offered and refused a bribe of £200,000 to surrender the castle; others including Robert Chambers in his 'Memorials of Edinburgh,’ who bases his assertions on 'information received from a member of the Preston family,’ declare that Guest was a Jacobite at heart; that at the council of war held on the arrival of the fugitives from the battle of Prestonpans he proposed to surrender, as the garrison was too weak to defend the place if attacked; and that this proposal was successfully opposed by George Preston, who remained in the castle as a volunteer, and according to this version was the real defender of the stronghold.

The castle was successfully held by General Guest and his garrison during the time Edinburgh was occupied by the rebels, the defenders cannonading Prince Charles's followers at the review preceding their march into England. Prince Charles ordered a blockade of the castle from 29 September 1745 hoping to starve the Government force into submission. Guest ordered the castle artillery to fire on the besiegers, which caused casualties amongst civilians resident in the neighborhood and damage to their property. The Jacobite blockade was accordingly lifted on 5 October and supplies to the castle resumed under an informal truce.

Preston, a veteran of eighty-seven, who, it is said, was wheeled round the guards and sentries in a chair every two hours during the hottest part of the blockade, went to his Scottish home unrewarded. Guest returned to London in a horse-litter, after the overthrow at the battle of Culloden (16 April 1746), to receive the gratitude of the king and people.

== Death ==
Guest died at his lodgings, Brook Street, London, 14 October 1747, and was buried in Westminster Abbey, where a monument was erected to him by his widow. In his will, dated 22 May 1746, and proved 26 October 1747, his wife Sarah is the only person mentioned. She died 17 July 1751, and is buried in the abbey near her husband. By her will she left lands and tenements to her husband's connections the Smiths, and considerable legacies to her own relatives of the names of Leigh, Blacklidge, and Winstanley. Guest's niece married Captain Leonard Smelt.
