= HMS Advice (1745) =

Ship of the line of the Royal Navy

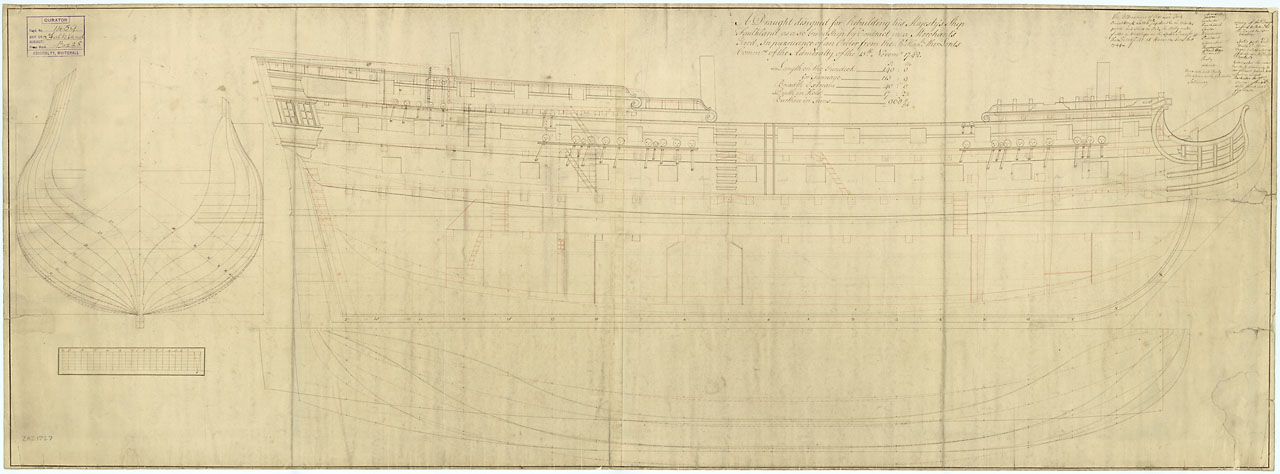
- Body plan, sheer lines with inboard detail, and longitudinal half-breadth for Advice

History

Great Britain
- Name: HMS Advice
- Ordered: 30 March 1744
- Builder: Rowcliffe, Southampton
- Launched: 26 February 1745
- Fate: Broken up, 1756

General characteristics
- Class & type: 1741 proposals 50-gun fourth rate ship of the line
- Tons burthen: 983
- Length: 140 ft (42.7 m) (gundeck)
- Beam: 40 ft (12.2 m)
- Depth of hold: 17 ft 2 1/2 in (5.2 m)
- Propulsion: Sails
- Sail plan: Full-rigged ship
- Armament: 50 guns: Gundeck: 22 × 24-pounders; Upper gundeck: 22 × 12-pounders; Quarterdeck: 4 × 6-pounders; Forecastle: 2 × 6-pounders

HMS Advice was a 50-gun fourth rate ship of the line of the Royal Navy, built at Southampton to the dimensions laid down in the 1741 proposals of the 1719 Establishment, and launched on 26 February 1745.

Advice served until she was broken up in 1756.
