= Anna Maria Bennett =

Welsh novelist

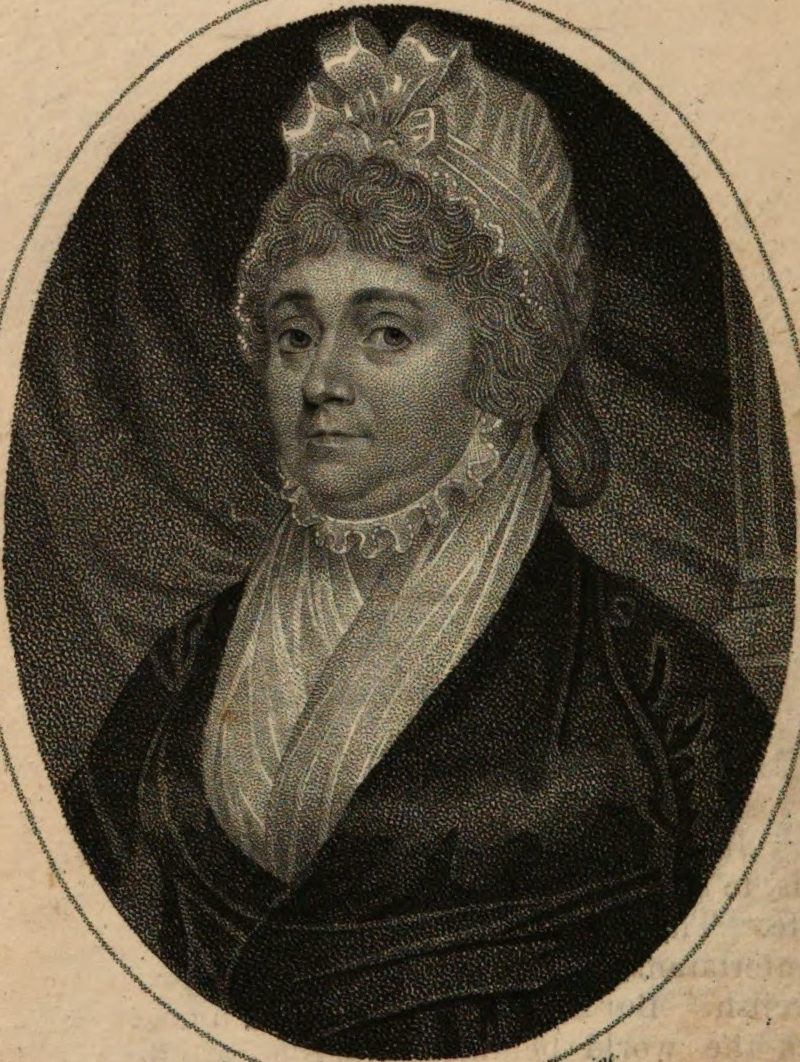
- Bennett in 1804
- Born: Ann Evans; 13 November 1746; London, England
- Died: 12 February 1808 (aged 61); Brighton, England
- Occupation: writer
- Known for: Writing novels such as Agnes de Courci
- Spouse: Thomas Bennett
- Partner: Admiral Thomas Pye
- Children: 2
- Parent: John Evans
- Relatives: Harriet Pye Esten (daughter)

Notes
- Baptised 30 November St Giles Cripplegate Married Thomas Bennett St Botolphs Aldgate 28 June 1763

Anna Maria Bennett (née Evans) (13 November 1746 – 12 February 1808) was a novelist who wrote in English. Some sources give her name as Agnes Maria Bennett. Her best-known work is the epistolary novel Agnes de-Courci (1789).

She worked as the housekeeper of Thomas Pye, and was also her employer's mistress. They had two illegitimate children, one of whom was the actress Harriet Pye Esten.

== Family ==
Anna was previously thought to come from Merthyr Tydfil Glamorgan, Wales, the daughter of a David Evans, who was described variously as a customs officer and a grocer. Discovered in recent genealogical research, a will proved on 13 November 1785, names her as being the daughter of John Evans born 1717, of Bear Lane Christ Church Surrey. He writes of her unhappy marriage to Thomas Bennett. He also names Sir Thomas Pye as recipient of part of his estate in order to support his daughter. John Evans' will was administered on 2 May 1789.

After leaving Thomas Bennett, eventually, Anna Maria found work in a chandler's shop. There she met Vice-Admiral Thomas Pye, who took her to his property in Tooting, Surrey, where she became his housekeeper and mistress.

She minc'd his meat, & made his bed
And warm'd it too, sometimes, 'tis said.'

The couple had at least two illegitimate children together, Thomas Pye Bennett and Harriet Pye Bennett. The latter became a famous actress as Harriet Pye Esten, with her mother tutoring her and helping to launch her career. The relationship ended with Pye's death in 1785, around the same time that Anna's first novel, Anna: Memoirs of a Welch Heiress, was published and became successful. When Pye died, he left his Suffolk Street town house to Bennett.

Her daughter, Harriet Pye Esten, initially appeared in Bath and Bristol before moving on to appear in Dublin. Whilst she was there in 1789 she and her mother negotiated a formal separation with James Esten. Bennett paid off her son-in-law's debts in exchange for his agreement. Her final work, Vicissitudes Abroad, was highly controversial. She died in Brighton.

== Works ==
- Anna: or Memoirs of a Welch Heiress, 1785
- Juvenile Indiscretions, 1786
- Agnes de-Courci: a Domestic Tale, 1789
- Ellen, Countess of Castle Howel, 1794
- The Beggar Girl and her Benefactors, 1797
- De Valcourt, 1800
- Vicissitudes Abroad, 1806

== Sources ==
- Humphreys, Jennett (2004). "'Bennett, Anna Maria (d. 1808)', rev. Rebecca Mills". Oxford Dictionary of National Biography. Oxford Dictionary of National Biography (online ed.). Oxford University Press. doi:10.1093/ref:odnb/2117. (Subscription, Wikipedia Library access or UK public library membership required.)
- Humphreys, Jennett (1885). "Bennett, Agnes Maria" . In Stephen, Leslie (ed.). Dictionary of National Biography. Vol. 4. London: Smith, Elder & Co.
