= Frederick S. Frank =

American literary scholar and bibliographer (1935–2008)

Frederick S. Frank (December 23, 1935 – February 28, 2008) was a literary scholar and bibliographer, credited as one of the founders of Gothic studies for his extensive bibliographic research.

== Biography ==
Frederick Frank was born in Cobleskill, New York on December 23, 1935. He and his wife Nancy had three children.

Frank received a B.A. from Union College in 1957, an M.A. from Columbia University in 1959, and a Ph.D. from Rutgers University in 1968. After graduation, he taught briefly at Boston University, before joining the faculty of Allegheny College, where he taught for 24 years before retiring in 1994. After retirement, he began the online bibliographic project The Sickly Taper, which is now hosted by the University of Windsor.

Frank died on February 28, 2008. In 2010, a special issue of the journal Papers on Language & Literature published papers on the Gothic in memory of Frank.

== Selected works ==
=== Bibliographies of Gothic literature ===
- The First Gothics: A Critical Guide to the English Gothic Novel. New York: Garland, 1987.
- Through the Pale Door: A Guide to and through the American Gothic. New York: Greenwood, 1990.
- "Gothic Gold: The Sadleir-Black Gothic Collection." Studies in Eighteenth-Century Culture 26 (1998): 310–16.
- Gothic Writers: A Critical and Bibliographical Guide. Co-edited with Douglass H. Thomson and Jack G. Voller Westport, CT: Greenwood, 2001.

=== Bibliographies of Gothic criticism ===
- Guide to the Gothic: An Annotated Bibliography of Criticism. Metuchen, NJ: Scarecrow, 1984.
- Guide to the Gothic II: An Annotated Bibliography of Criticism, 1983-1993. Lanham, MD: Scarecrow, 1995.
- Guide to the Gothic III: An Annotated Bibliography of Criticism, 1994-2003. 2 vols. Lanham, MD: Scarecrow, 2003.
- The Sickly Taper: A Bibliography of Gothic Scholarship. Online.
