= Harriet Pye Esten =

English stage actress (1760s-1865)

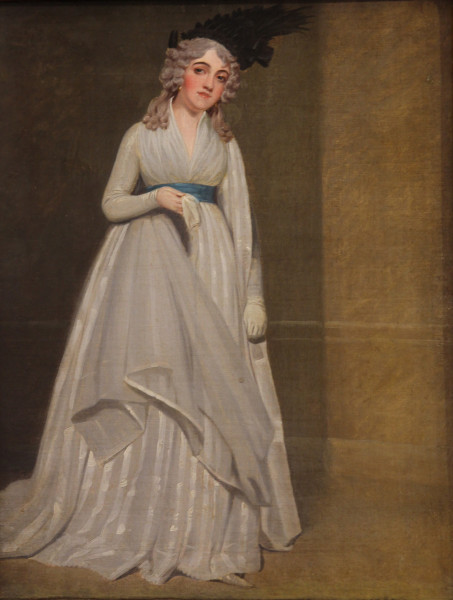
- Portrait by Samuel De Wilde
- Born: Harriet Pye Bennett; 1760s? Tooting, London
- Died: 1865; Knightsbridge, London
- Resting place: Kensal Green Cemetery, London
- Other name: Harriet Pye Scott-Waring
- Occupation: Actress
- Spouse(s): James Esten (m. 1784) Major John Scott-Waring (m. 1812)
- Partner: Douglas Hamilton, 8th Duke of Hamilton
- Children: 2
- Parents: Admiral Sir Thomas Pye (father); Anna Maria Bennett (mother)
- Relatives: Henry Westenra (son-in-law)

Harriet Pye Esten or Harriet Pye Scott-Waring born Harriet Pye Bennett (1760s? – 1865) was an English actress, and briefly a theatre manager.

== Life ==
Esten was born in Tooting in or around the 1760s. She was the daughter of housekeeper Anna Maria Bennett and her employer and lover Admiral Sir Thomas Pye.

In 1784 she married James Esten who was in the navy. Esten was taught to act by her mother, who assisted her daughter throughout her career. She initially appeared in Bath and Bristol before moving on to appear at the Smock Alley Theatre in Dublin. Whilst she was there in 1789 she and her mother negotiated a formal separation with James Esten. Her mother, who was a successful novelist, paid off her husband's debts in exchange for his agreement.

The following year she made her first appearance on the London stage at Covent Garden on 20 October. She appeared as Rosalind in "As You Like It", a role she had portrayed successfully in York. She appeared in London for a year at her own expense but after that she was engaged at £11 a week for a further three years.

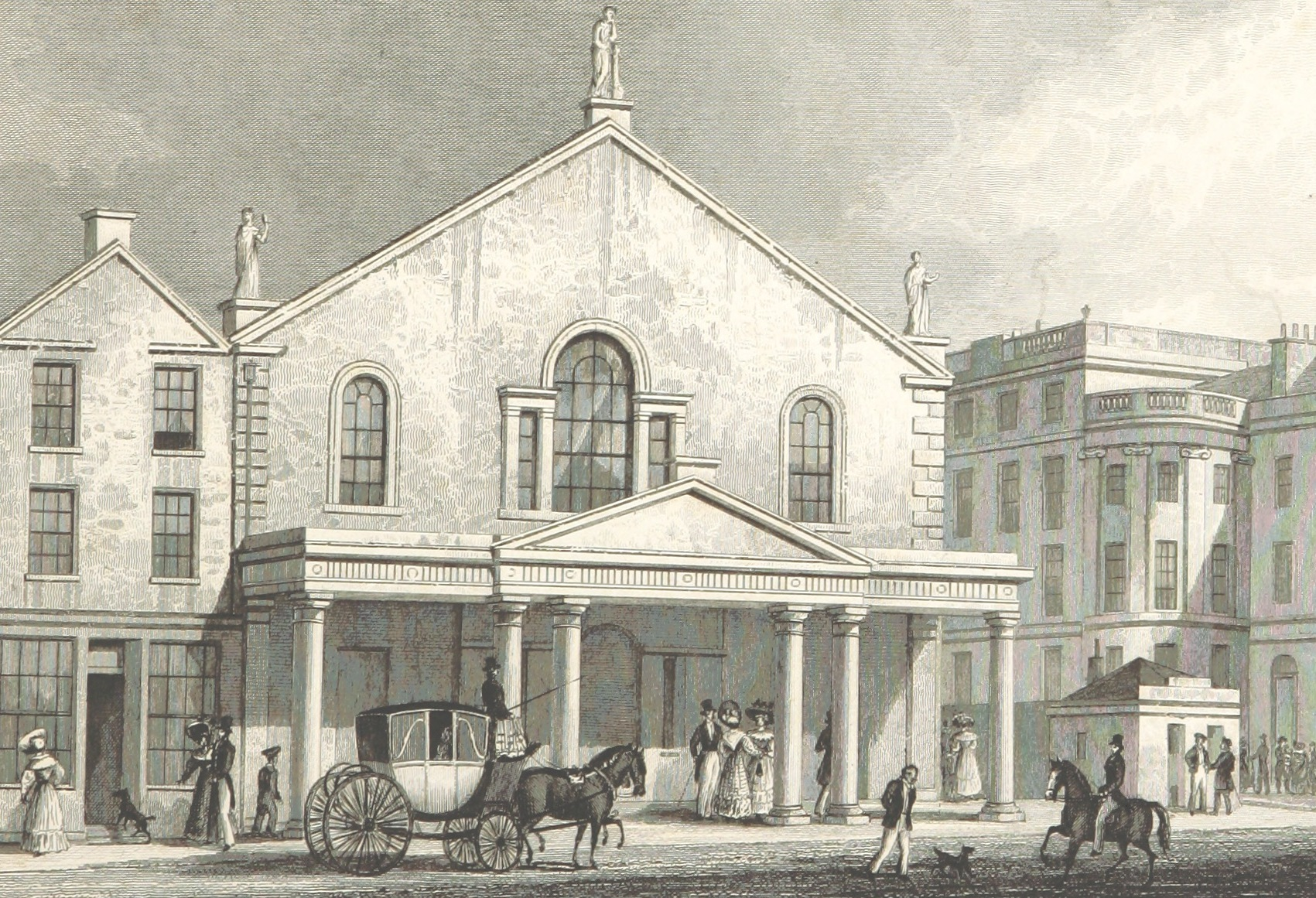
Esten's Theatre Royal in Edinburgh

In July 1792 she became a theatre manager when she purchased the lease of the Theatre Royal, Edinburgh. The theatre had been run by Stephen Kemble but he lost the rights to perform under the powers of Esten's lover Douglas Hamilton, 8th Duke of Hamilton. In 1796 she gave birth to the Duke's child, Anne Douglas-Hamilton. She had previously retired from Covent Garden whilst pregnant and returned the rights to Stephen Kemble to perform in Edinburgh for £200 a year.

Samuel De Wilde painted Esten as Lady Flutter in the comedy by Mrs Sheridan called The Discovery. This was a role that she never played in London. The painting is now owned by the Garrick Club.

On 15 October 1812 Esten married the former Member of Parliament Major John Scott-Waring. He was Warren Hastings' agent and she was his third wife. They had two children. He died in 1819.

In 1820 her daughter, Anne Douglas-Hamilton, married Henry Westenra, 3rd Baron Rossmore.

Esten died at her house in Knightsbridge in 1865 and was buried in Kensal Green Cemetery. Her death certificate is the source of her presumed date of birth.
