= Andrew Frazer (British Army officer) =

Scottish soldier and engineer

Lt Col Andrew Frazer FRSE (sometimes spelt Fraser; died 1792), was a Scottish soldier and engineer. He served as lieutenant-colonel of engineers, designing and superintending the construction of Fort George. He was the architect of St Andrew's Church, on George Street, Edinburgh.

== Life ==
Frazer was the son of George Frazer, a deputy surveyor of excise in Scotland, was probably employed on the works at Fort George after the Scottish rebellion of 1745–6.

Andrew was appointed practitioner engineer, with rank of ensign in the train, on 17 March 1759, and sub-engineer, with rank of lieutenant, in 1761. In 1763 he was ordered to Dunkirk, and served as assistant to John Peter Desmaretz, the British commissary appointed to watch the demolition of the works of that port in accordance with treaty obligations. On 18 October 1767 he succeeded Desmaretz in that office, and retained it until the rupture with France in 1778. In the manuscript collections of the British Library are two reports from Frazer: 'A Description of Dunkirk,’ 1769, and 'Report and Plans of Dunkirk,’ 1772. A letter from Frazer to Lord Stormont, British ambassador at Paris in 1777 (ib. 24164, f. 172), indicates that he discharged consular functions at Dunkirk. He became engineer in ordinary and captain in 1772, brevet-major in 1782, and regimental lieutenant-colonel in 1788. He designed St. Andrew's parochial church, Edinburgh, built in 1785.

In 1773 he married Charlotte Durnford, daughter of Stillingfleet Durnford, of the engineer department, and granddaughter of Colonel Desmaretz; by her he was father of Sir Augustus Simon Frazer.

In 1783 he was a founding fellow of the Royal Society of Edinburgh. At this time his address is given simply as George Street, Edinburgh.

He died en route to Geneva on 31 August 1792.

== Artistic recognition ==
A portrait of Major Andrew Fraser (sic) is catalogued in Evans's 'Engraved Portraits', vol. ii., in which the date of death is wrongly given as 1795.
