= George Preston (British Army officer, died 1748) =

Scottish army officer

- Born: c.1659
- Died: 7 July 1748 (aged 88); Valleyfield, Fife
- Military career
- Allegiance: Great Britain
- Branch: British Army
- Service years: 1692–1748
- Rank: Lieutenant-general
- Unit: Royal Scots Dragoons
- Commands: The Cameronians; Governor of Nieuport; Deputy-Governor of Edinburgh Castle; Commander-in-Chief, Scottish Forces
- Conflicts: Nine Years' War; War of the Spanish Succession; Battle of Blenheim; Battle of Ramillies (WIA); Battle of Malplaquet; Jacobite rising of 1715; Jacobite rising of 1745

George Preston (c. 1659 – 1748) was a Scottish army officer, known for his involvement in the Jacobite risings.

== Early life ==
He was the second son of George Preston, sixth of Valleyfield, who was created a baronet of Nova Scotia on 31 March 1637. His mother was Marion, only child of Hugh Sempill, 5th Lord Sempill. He was captain in the service of the States General of the Netherlands in 1688, and attended William, Prince of Orange on his expedition to England. Subsequently he served in the Nine Years' War and War of the Spanish Succession, and at the battle of Ramillies he was severely wounded.

== The 1715 ==
In 1706 Preston was made colonel of the Cameronian regiment, and he retained the post till 1720. At the outbreak of the Jacobite rising of 1715 he was sent from London to take command of Edinburgh Castle, and in due course was appointed its lieutenant-governor of the castle. He was also made commander-in-chief of the loyalist forces in Scotland.

== The 1745 ==
On the outbreak of the Jacobite rising of 1745 the London government sent Lieutenant-General Joshua Guest to take command of the garrison of the Edinburgh Castle. On one view, that of James Grant, after the battle of Prestonpans, Guest was deterred from surrendering the castle merely by the resolute Preston; but, according to John Home, Guest deliberately spread a rumour that he was at the point of surrendering the castle, to detain the Highlanders in a siege of the castle.

In any case the aged Preston was active and determined, and (Grant says) was wheeled in an armchair round all the guards, every two hours. When the Jacobite forces sent a flag of truce to the castle, and threatened, unless it were surrendered, to burn Valleyfield, he replied that in that case he would have his majesty's cruisers burn down Wemyss Castle: the Earl of Wemyss had a son Lord Elcho who was a general in the service of the Young Pretender.

== Death and legacy ==
Preston died on 7 July 1748, and left no issue. He had paid off the encumbrances on the estate of Valleyfield, and so acquired the right of the entail. of the property. This he executed in favour of the heirs, male and female, of his brother Sir William, and his nephew Sir George.

== Notes ==
Attribution

This article incorporates text from a publication now in the public domain: Lee, Sidney, ed. (1896). "Preston, George". Dictionary of National Biography. Vol. 46. London: Smith, Elder & Co.
