= Leith Roads =

Coastal water near Edinburgh, Scotland

Coordinates: 55.99896°N 3.15067°W

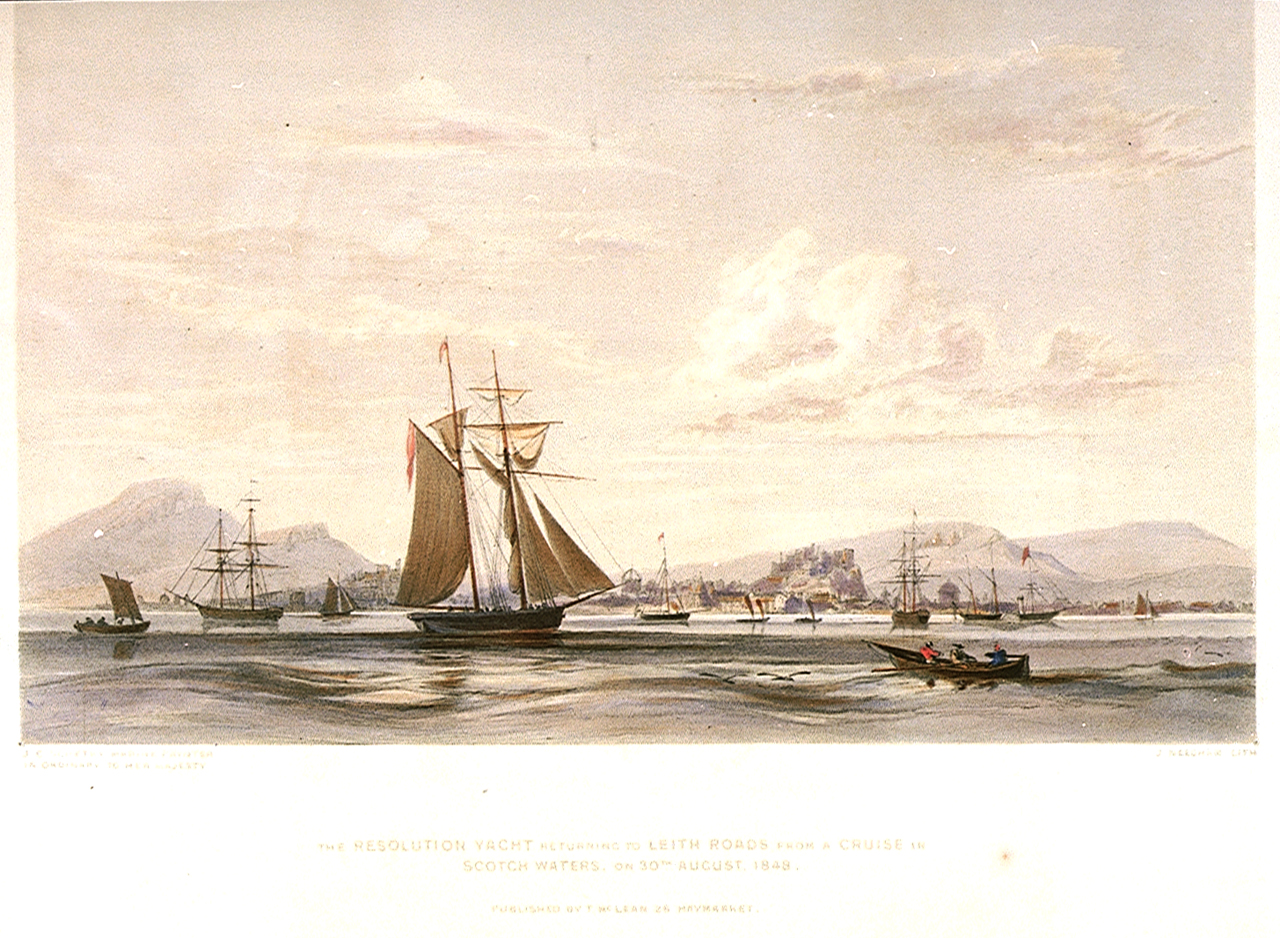
The Resolution Yacht returning to Leith Roads from a Cruise in Scotch Waters, in 1848 from a drawing by John Christian Schetky

Leith Roads or Leith Road is a stretch of water off the coastal town of Leith, Scotland. The waters extend about two miles (3 km) offshore and provide a generally safe anchor, protected from the gales as they are, by Inchkeith.

It is located between Middle Bank (to the west of Inchkeith) and the coastline of Leith and Newhaven. The water depth is around 5 to 10 m (16 to 33 ft) at low tide. A designated small vessel anchorage and Lima Anchorage are marked on modern charts. Part of the area of Leith Roads was incorporated into the Outer Harbour of the Port of Leith, by the construction of breakwaters between 1936 and 1942.

The English landscape painter J. M. W. Turner drew a pair of sketches in 1822 entitled Shipping in Leith Roads which are part of the Tate's collection.

On 21 October 1875 the Schooner Lindisfarne jettisoned about 30 tonnes of coal in the Leith Roads after suffering damage to the tiller and other slight damage.
