= Aniruddha Bose =

Former judge of Supreme Court of India (2019-2024)

Hon'ble Justice (Retd.) Aniruddha Bose
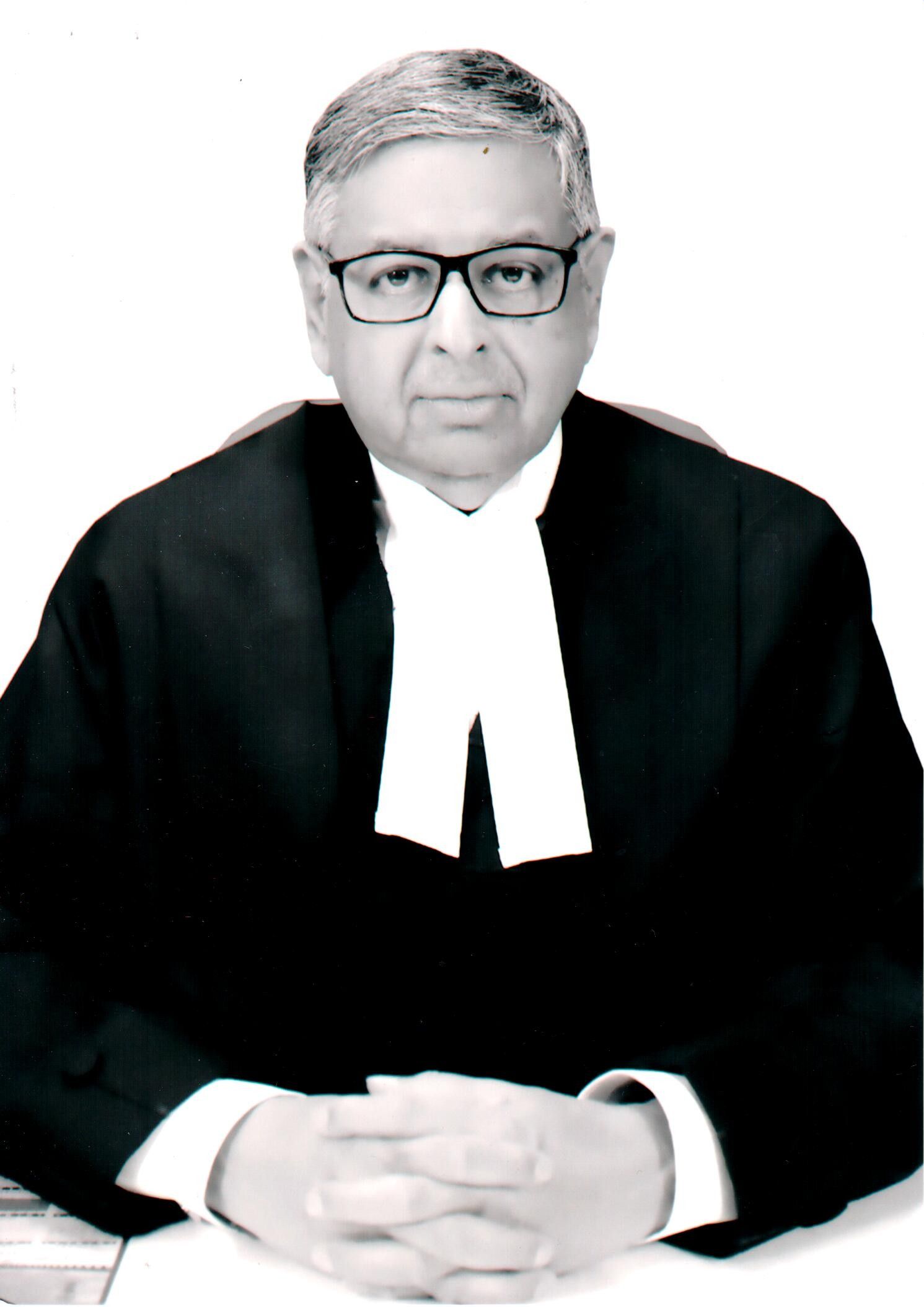

Judge of Supreme Court of India
- In office 24 May 2019 – 10 April 2024
- Nominated by: Ranjan Gogoi
- Appointed by: Ram Nath Kovind

12th Chief Justice of Jharkhand High Court
- In office 4 August 2018 – 23 May 2019
- Nominated by: Dipak Misra
- Appointed by: Ram Nath Kovind
- Preceded by: P. K. Mohanty; D. N. Patel (acting)
- Succeeded by: Ravi Ranjan; D. N. Patel (acting); Prashant Kumar (acting); H. C. Mishra (acting)

Judge of Calcutta High Court
- In office 19 January 2004 – 3 August 2018
- Nominated by: V. N. Khare
- Appointed by: A. P. J. Abdul Kalam

Personal details
- Born: 11 April 1959 (age 67) Kolkata, West Bengal
- Education: St. Xavier's College, Kolkata (B.Com), Surendranath Law College (LL.B)

Aniruddha Bose (born 11 April 1959) is a former judge of the Supreme Court of India. He is also a former chief justice of the Jharkhand High Court and judge of the Calcutta High Court.

== Education ==
Bose was born on 11 April 1959 in Kolkata, West Bengal. He completed his Higher Secondary education at St. Lawrence High School, Kolkata, in 1976. He graduated in Commerce from St. Xavier's College, Kolkata, and obtained his LL.B. degree from Surendranath Law College, affiliated with the University of Calcutta. He enrolled with the Bar Council of West Bengal in October 1985 and began practising at the Calcutta High Court. He worked on both its Original and Appellate Sides, specialising in constitutional, civil and intellectual property matters.

== Career ==
On 19 January 2004, he was elevated as a permanent Judge of the Calcutta High Court, where he served for over fourteen years. His name was recommended for elevation as the Chief Justice of Delhi High Court but returned by the Government of India, with the observation that he does not have the experience to handle the affairs of the High Court like Delhi. The collegium reconsidered the proposal and he was transferred to Jharkhand High Court as chief justice on 4 August 2018. On 11 August 2018, he assumed office as Chief Justice of the Jharkhand High Court.

Subsequently, he was elevated to the Supreme Court of India on 24 May 2019. Over the course of his Supreme Court tenure, Bose authored 67 judgments. He was a member of benches that heard arguments on challenges to the practice of Jallikattu, decriminalisation of adultery, and whether there was a right to die.

He retired from the Supreme Court on 10 April 2024. Following retirement, he continued his association with judicial education and institutional development. He has served as the Director of the National Judicial Academy, Bhopal, contributing to judicial training and capacity-building.
