= Dhirubhai Naranbhai Patel =

Chairperson of Telecom Disputes Settlement and Appellate Tribunal

Hon'ble Chief Justice (Retd.) Dhirubhai Naranbhai Patel
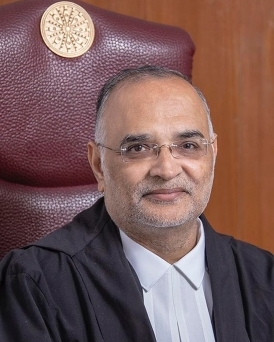

8th Chairperson of Telecom Disputes Settlement and Appellate Tribunal
- Incumbent
- Assumed office 14 March 2022
- Appointed by: Appointments Committee of the Cabinet
- Preceded by: Shiva Kirti Singh

31st Chief Justice of Delhi High Court
- In office 7 June 2019 – 12 March 2022
- Nominated by: Ranjan Gogoi
- Appointed by: Ram Nath Kovind
- Preceded by: Rajendra Menon
- Succeeded by: S. C. Sharma; Vipin Sanghi (acting)

Judge of Jharkhand High Court
- In office 3 February 2009 – 6 June 2019
- Nominated by: K. G. Balakrishnan
- Appointed by: Pratibha Patil
- Acting Chief justice
- In office 24 May 2019 – 6 June 2019
- Appointed by: Ram Nath Kovind
- Preceded by: Aniruddha Bose
- Succeeded by: Ravi Ranjan; Prashant Kumar (acting); H. C. Mishra (acting)
- In office 10 June 2017 – 10 August 2018
- Appointed by: Pranab Mukherjee
- Preceded by: P. K. Mohanty
- Succeeded by: Aniruddha Bose
- In office 13 August 2014 – 31 October 2014
- Appointed by: Pranab Mukherjee
- Preceded by: R. Banumathi
- Succeeded by: Virender Singh
- In office 4 August 2013 – 15 November 2013
- Appointed by: Pranab Mukherjee
- Preceded by: P. C. Tatia
- Succeeded by: R. Banumathi

Judge of Gujarat High Court
- In office 7 March 2004 – 2 February 2009
- Nominated by: V. N. Khare
- Appointed by: A. P. J. Abdul Kalam

Personal details
- Born: 13 March 1960 (age 66) Gujarat
- Education: B.Sc, M.Sc, LL.B and LL.M
- Alma mater: L. A. Shah Law College

Dhirubhai Naranbhai Patel (born 13 March 1960) is a retired Indian judge. Presently, he is serving as the Chairperson of Telecom Disputes Settlement and Appellate Tribunal. He is a former Chief Justice of Delhi High Court. He has also served as Acting Chief Justice of Jharkhand High Court and Judge of Jharkhand High Court and Gujarat High Court.

== Early life and education ==
Patel was born on 13 March 1960. He completed his B.Sc from M. G. Science college, Ahmedabad in 1979 and M.Sc from University school of Science in 1981, he also did LL.B and LL.M from L.A. Shah Law College in 1984 and 1986 respectively. He was enrolled as an advocate on 27 July 1984 and practiced in the Gujarat High Court at Ahmedabad. He also served as part time lecturer in L.A. Shah Law College for 9 years at both LL.B and LL.M level.

== Career ==
He was appointed as Additional central government standing counsel by union government in 1999 and as senior central government standing counsel for Gujarat High Court on 5 July 2001. He was appointed an Additional Judge of the Gujarat High Court on 7 March 2004 and Permanent Judge on 25 January 2006. He was transferred as a judge of the Jharkhand High Court on 3 February 2009. In Jharkhand High Court, he served as acting chief justice on four occasions in 2013, 2014 2017-18 and 2019.

In May 2019, Supreme Court collegium recommended his name to be appointed as Chief Justice of Delhi High Court and he was elevated as Chief Justice of Delhi High Court on 7 June 2019. He retired as Delhi High Court's chief justice on 12 March 2022. He was appointed as the Chairperson of Telecom Disputes Settlement and Appellate Tribunal even before his retirement as chief justice in March 2022 and formally assumed charge as chairperson of TDSAT on 14 March 2022.
