= Tribunal =

Judicial or quasi-judicial body

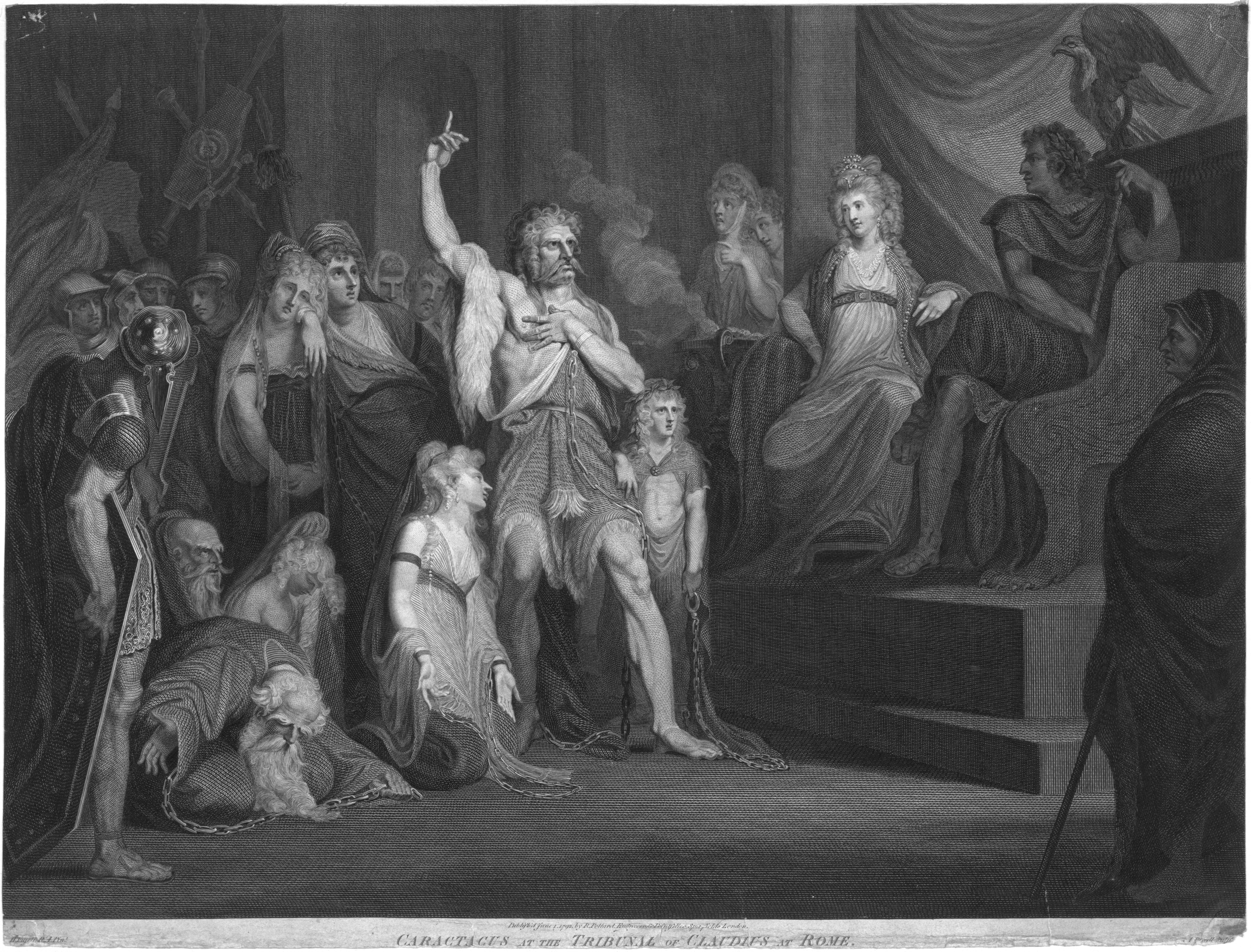
Andrew Birrell (after Henry Fuseli), Caractacus at the Tribunal of Claudius at Rome (1792)

A tribunal, generally, is any person or institution with authority to judge, adjudicate on, or determine claims or disputes—whether or not it is called a tribunal in its title. For example, an advocate who appears before a court with a single judge could describe that judge as "their tribunal". Many governmental bodies are titled "tribunals" to emphasize that they are not courts of normal jurisdiction. For instance, the International Criminal Tribunal for Rwanda was a body specially constituted under international law; in Great Britain, employment tribunals are bodies set up to hear specific employment disputes.

In many but not all cases, tribunal implies a judicial or quasi-judicial body with a lesser degree of formality than a court, in which the normal rules of evidence and procedure may not apply, and whose presiding officers are frequently neither judges nor magistrates. Private judicial bodies are also often-styled tribunals. Tribunal is not conclusive of a body's function; in Great Britain, the Employment Appeal Tribunal is a superior court of record.

The term is derived from the tribunes, magistrates of the Classical Roman Republic. Tribunal originally referred to the office of the tribunes, and the term is still sometimes used in this sense in historical writings. The tribunal was the platform upon which the presiding authority sat; having a raised position physically was symbolic of their higher position regarding the adjudication of the law.

== By country ==
=== Australia ===
In Australia, tribunal generally implies a body with a lesser degree of formality than a court, with a simplified legal procedure, often presided over by a lawyer (solicitor or barrister) who is not a judge or magistrate (often referred to as a member of the tribunal). In many cases, the lawyers who function as tribunal members do so only part-time and spend the greater part of their time carrying out other aspects of legal practice, such as representing clients. In many cases, the formal rules of evidence that apply in courts do not apply in tribunals, which enables tribunals to hear forms of evidence that courts may not be allowed to consider. Tribunals generally deal with simpler matters; while legal representation is permitted and not uncommon, self-representation is much more common in tribunals than in courts, and tribunal members and registry staff are generally more accustomed to dealing with self-represented parties than courts are. Appeal from a tribunal is to a court.

Tribunals in Australia include the following:

- Administrative Review Tribunal
- New South Wales Civil and Administrative Tribunal
- Queensland Civil and Administrative Tribunal
- State Administrative Tribunal
- Victorian Civil and Administrative Tribunal

Every state has a "supertribunal" that covers a wide range of administrative decisions and, in some cases, has civil jurisdiction. In several Australian states, tribunals function as the equivalent of a small claims court.

In the context of sport, "tribunal" frequently refers to the AFL Tribunal, the disciplinary body of the Australian Football League.

=== Bangladesh ===
In Bangladesh, tribunal refers to a court that serves some special purpose, of which Bangladesh has several. These have been set up to ensure speedy trial and reduce case congestion in the normal courts. Besides this, Article 117 of the Constitution of Bangladesh empowers the parliament to set up one or more administrative tribunals. No court can entertain any proceeding or make any order regarding any matter within such tribunal's jurisdiction.

=== Belgium ===
In the judicial system of Belgium, the names of the lower trial courts can be translated into English as "tribunals" (Dutch: rechtbank, French: tribunal, German: gericht). In comparison, the higher appellate courts can be translated as "courts" (Dutch: hof, French: cour, German: hof).

=== Brazil ===
The Judiciary of Brazil officially names "tribunal" the appeal court and the ones above it, always with more than one judge. The higher court is the Supremo Tribunal Federal (Supreme Federal Court), followed by the superior tribunals (Superior Tribunal de Justiça, Tribunal Superior Eleitoral, Tribunal Superior do Trabalho, Superior Tribunal Militar). The federal justice is divided into regions; each has its Tribunal Regional Federal (Regional Federal Court). Also, each state has its own Tribunal de Justiça (Justice Court).

=== Canada ===
- Civil Resolution Tribunal, an online Tribunal in British Columbia (BC).
- Landlord and Tenant Board, formerly the Ontario Rental Housing Tribunal.
- Ontario Condominium Authority, facilitates dispute resolution between condo owners and boards regarding issues such as noise complaints.

=== Hong Kong ===
The following tribunals exist within the Judiciary of the Hong Kong Special Administrative Region of the People's Republic of China: Lands, Small Claims, Labour, Obscene Articles. For public inquiries, commissions are set up instead under the Commissions of Inquiry Ordinance.

=== India ===
There are tribunals for settling various administrative and tax-related disputes, including Central Administrative Tribunal, Income Tax Appellate Tribunal, Customs, Excise and Service Tax Appellate Tribunal, National Green Tribunal, Competition Appellate Tribunal and Securities Appellate Tribunal, among others.

The National Company Law Tribunal is a quasi-judicial body in India that adjudicates issues relating to Indian companies.

National Company Law Appellate Tribunal was constituted under Section 410 of the Companies Act, 2013, for hearing appeals against National Company Law Tribunal orders, effective 1 June 2016.

In several states, Food Safety Appellate Tribunals have been created to hear appeals against orders of adjudicating officers for food safety (additional deputy commissioners).

Armed Forces Tribunal is a military tribunal in India. It was established under the Armed Forces Tribunal Act, 2007.

Permanent Lok Adalat (PUS) is a law court (also known as People's Court) and special tribunal set up in some districts throughout the country. It has been established under the Legal Services Authorities Act, 1987.

=== Ireland ===
In the Republic of Ireland, tribunal popularly refers to a public inquiry established under the Tribunals of Inquiry (Evidence) Act 1921. The main difference between a Parliamentary Inquiry (non-statutory) and a Tribunal of Inquiry in Ireland is that non-statutory inquiries are not vested with the powers, privileges, and rights of the High Court. Tribunals of Inquiry are. Tribunals are established by resolution of the Houses of the Oireachtas to enquire into matters of urgent public importance. It is not a function of Tribunals to administer justice; their work is solely inquisitorial. Tribunals are obliged to report their findings to the Oireachtas. They can enforce the attendance and examination of witnesses and produce documents relevant to the work. Tribunals can consist of one or more people. A layperson or non-lawyer may be the Sole member of a tribunal.

=== Netherlands ===
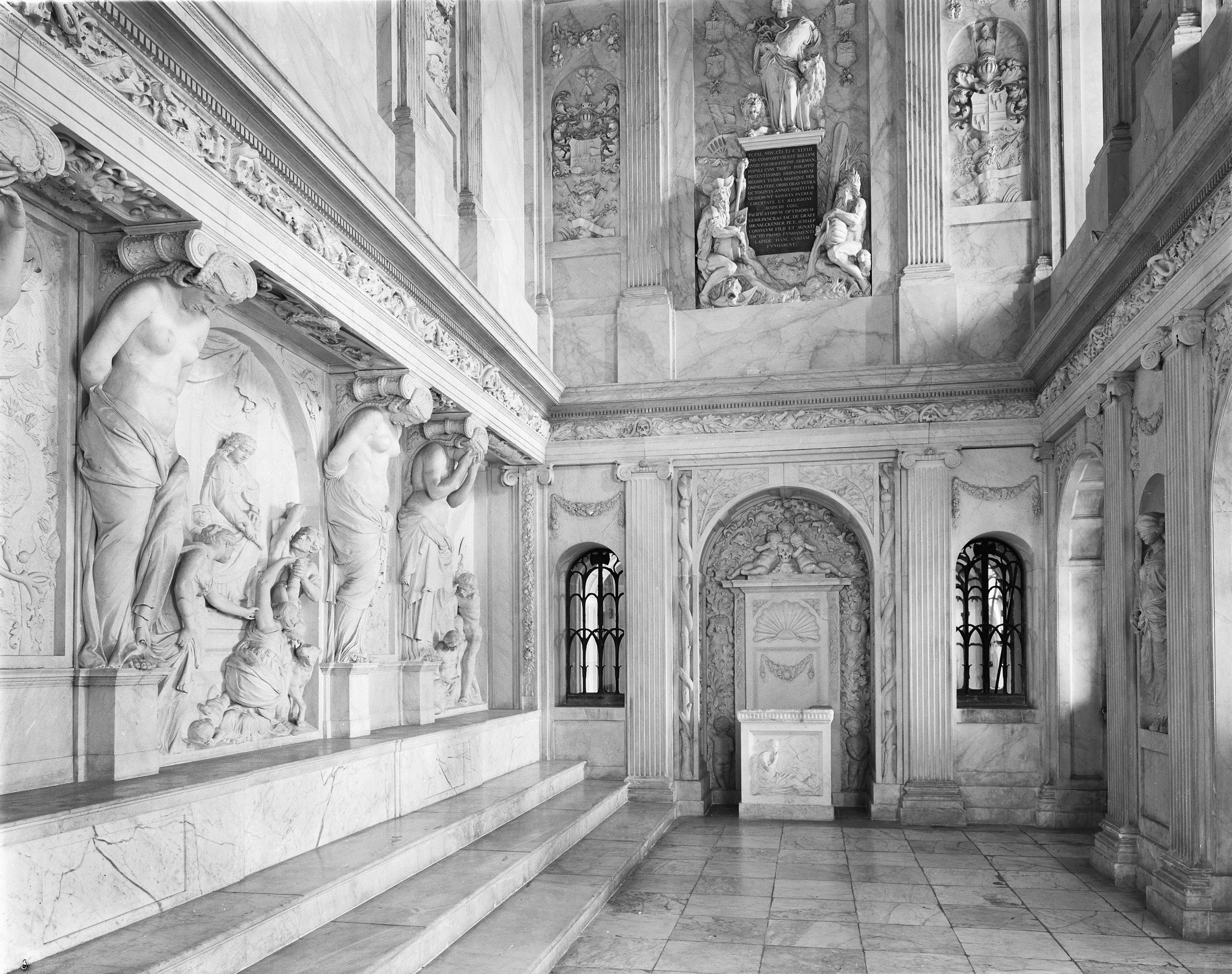
The room where the Vierschaar adjucated in the former Amsterdam City Hall (now the Royal Palace)

Historically, before the separation of lawmaking, law enforcement, and justice duties in the Netherlands, all sentences were delivered by a tribunal of seven schepenen, or magistrates, appointed by the local count. Such a tribunal was called a Vierschaar, so named for a rope—or cord—drawn (schaar or scheren) in a four-square dimension, wherein the judges sat on four benches. These benches were also positioned in a square, with the defendant standing in the middle. Towns had the Vierschaar privilege to hear disputes. The Vierschaar was usually located in the town hall, and many historical town halls still have such a room, usually decorated with scenes from the Judgement of Solomon.

=== New Zealand ===
In New Zealand, a tribunal is a body designed to resolve disputes that is faster and less formal than a full court, and usually focuses on a designated area of law. There are more than 100 in New Zealand, but the largest are the Disputes Tribunal (equivalent to small claims court) and the Tenancy Tribunal.

The Waitangi Tribunal, which reviews breaches of the Treaty of Waitangi, has features of both a tribunal and a commission of inquiry. It also incorporates tikanga Māori (Māori customs).

=== United Kingdom ===
The tribunal system of the United Kingdom is part of the national system of administrative justice. The system grew on an ad hoc basis from the beginning of the twentieth century, but reforms were introduced in 2007 to place most tribunals in a unified system with recognised judicial authority, routes of appeal and regulatory supervision.

=== United States ===
"Tribunal" is used in the U.S. generally to refer to courts or judicial bodies, as in the ABA Model Rules of Professional Conduct. The Ohio Rules of Professional Conduct, for instance, define "tribunal" as "a court, an arbitrator in a binding arbitration, or a legislative body, administrative agency, or other body acting in an adjudicative capacity."

== By sector ==
=== Catholic Church ===
In the Catholic Church, ecclesiastical courts are called tribunals. Tribunals are distinguished by grade, while proceedings are distinguished by instance; for example, an archdiocesan tribunal may hear a cause in the first instance if the cause is first brought before the archdiocesan tribunal. Or, if the cause was first heard before the diocesan tribunal and is now appealed to the archdiocesan tribunal, the latter may hear the cause in the second instance. Only the Roman Rota can hear causes in the third instance, with limited exceptions. Other tribunals are incompetent in the third instance because of grade (ratione gradus) since they do not have the jurisdiction to judge in the third instance. Tribunals include:

- diocesan or eparchal tribunals (including archdiocesan or archeparchal tribunals)
- interdiocesan tribunals, that is, a tribunal erected by the Holy See for more than one diocese, either as a tribunal of the first instance or as an appellate tribunal in the second instance
- the synod of bishops of patriarchal churches is the highest tribunal within the territory of the patriarchal church, without prejudice to the primacy of the Apostolic See
- ordinary tribunal of the patriarchal church, distinct from the eparchial tribunal of the patriarchal church
- ordinary tribunals of the Apostolic See
  - Supreme Tribunal of the Apostolic Signatura, the highest tribunal in the canon law of the Catholic Church
  - Tribunal of the Roman Rota, the highest appellate tribunal competent in most causes in the second and third instances and some causes in the first instance
  - Apostolic Penitentiary, a tribunal for matters concerning the internal forum
  - Supreme tribunal of the Congregation for the Doctrine of the Faith for certain more grave delicts (canonical crimes)

=== In health sector ===
Tribunals also play an integral role in health sectors within and across nations. They are often referred to as "adjunctive tribunals". These quasi-judicial bodies possess regulatory, oversight, and dispute-resolution powers to aid health decision-making and governance. At the same time, the actual effects of adjunctive tribunals on health services are disputed, as little evidence exists to evaluate their efficacy. More empirical evaluations are needed to ensure that tribunals operate in a more evidence-based, systematic manner within the health sector.

== See also ==
- Constitutional court
- International Criminal Tribunal for the Former Yugoslavia
- Iraqi Special Tribunal
- Lindsay Tribunal
- Nuremberg Trials
- Public Inquiry
- Revolutionary Tribunal
- Revolutionary tribunal (Russia)
- The Elder Scrolls III: Tribunal (Morrowind expansion pack)
- Tribunal for Local Governments in Kerala
- Tribune
- Waitangi Tribunal
- World Courts of Women
- Canadian tribunals
