= Judge advocate general =

A judge advocate general is a principal judicial officer for a military branch or the armed forces at large, typically the most senior judge-advocate.

Uses of the title include:

- Judge Advocate General (Australia)
- Judge Advocate General (Canada)
- Defence Judge Advocate Corps (Denmark)
- Judge Advocate General (India)
  - Judge Advocate General's Department (India)
- Military Advocate General (Israel)
- Judge Advocate General Branch (Pakistan)
- Judge Advocate General (Sri Lanka)
- Judge Advocate General of the Armed Forces (United Kingdom)
- Judge Advocate General's Corps (United States) which is the judicial arm of any of the triune United States armed forces:
  - Judge Advocate General of the United States Army and the United States Army Judge Advocate General's Corps
  - Judge Advocate General of the Navy and the United States Navy Judge Advocate General's Corps
    - United States Marine Corps Judge Advocate Division
  - Judge Advocate General of the Air Force and the United States Air Force Judge Advocate General's Corps
  - United States Coast Guard Legal Division

== See also ==
- The Code (American TV series), a U.S.-produced television show based on the United States Marine Corps Judge Advocate General's Corps
- JAG (TV series), a U.S.-produced television show based on the United States Navy's Judge Advocate General's Corps
- Starfleet Judge Advocate General, an agency in the fictional Star Trek universe
- Judge
- Advocate general
