= Virender Singh (judge) =

Indian judge (born 1954)

Hon'ble Chief Justice (Retd.) Virender Singh

Chairperson of Armed Forces Tribunal
- In office 3 January 2017 – 6 October 2019
- Appointed by: Pranab Mukherjee
- Preceded by: Prakash Chandra Tatia
- Succeeded by: Rajendra Menon

10th Chief justice of Jharkhand High Court
- In office 1 November 2014 – 6 October 2016
- Nominated by: H. L. Dattu
- Appointed by: Pranab Mukherjee
- Preceded by: R. Banumathi; D. N. Patel (acting)
- Succeeded by: Pradip Kumar Mohanty

Judge of Jammu & Kashmir High Court
- In office 19 April 2007 – 31 October 2014
- Nominated by: K. G. Balakrishnan
- Appointed by: A. P. J. Abdul Kalam
- Acting Chief Justice
- In office 2 April 2012 – 8 June 2012
- Appointed by: Pratibha Patil
- Preceded by: F. M. I. Kalifulla
- Succeeded by: Mahesh Mittal Kumar

Judge of Punjab & Haryana High Court
- In office 2 July 2002 – 18 April 2007
- Nominated by: B. N. Kirpal
- Appointed by: K. R. Narayanan

Personal details
- Born: 7 October 1954 (age 72)
- Education: Government College, Rohtak; J. V. Jain College (LL.B)

Virender Singh (born 7 October 1954) is a retired Indian judge, who served as the 10th Chief Justice of Jharkhand High Court and judge in the Punjab & Haryana and Jammu & Kashmir High Court. He also served as the Chairman of Armed Forces Tribunal from 2017 to 2019.

== Career ==
Singh passed from Government College, Rohtak and completed his Degree of Law from J. V. Jain College, Saharanpur. He started practice from June 1978 in Rohtak. Singh was appointed Deputy Advocate General, Haryana twice from May 1995 to April 1996 and again from July 1996 to January 1999.

On 2 July 2002 he was appointed Judge of Punjab and Haryana High Court thereafter transferred to Jammu and Kashmir High Court on 19 April 2007. He served as acting Chief Justice of Jammu and Kashmir High Court from 2 April 2012 to 8 June 2012. Singh became the Chief Justice of Jharkhand High Court on 1 November 2014 and retired on 7 October 2016.

After the retirement he was appointed the Chairperson of the Armed Forces Tribunal (AFT) on 3 January 2017.
