= S. C. Dharmadhikari =

Former Judge of Bombay High Court

Justice Satyaranjan C. Dharmadhikari

Judge of Bombay High Court
- In office 14 November 2003 – 15 February 2020
- Nominated by: V. N. Khare
- Appointed by: A. P. J. Abdul Kalam

Personal details
- Born: 26 January 1960 (age 66)
- Education: University of Bombay

Satyaranjan C. Dharmadhikari was an Indian Judge. He is the former Judge of Bombay High Court.

== Early life ==
Born on 26 January 1960 in a family of lawyers. His father is late Justice C. S. Dharmadhikari. He has done B.Com. and LL.B. from Bombay University and enrolled as an Advocate on 28 June 1983.

== Judge ==
He has elevated as an Additional Judge at Bombay High Court on 14 November 2003. He has resigned on 15 February 2020 from his position over transfer to Madhya Pradesh High Court citing personal reasons. He was the senior-most Judge at Bombay Court at the time of his resignation.
