= Shree Chandrashekhar =

Judge of the Supreme Court of India

Hon'ble Justice Shree Chandrashekhar
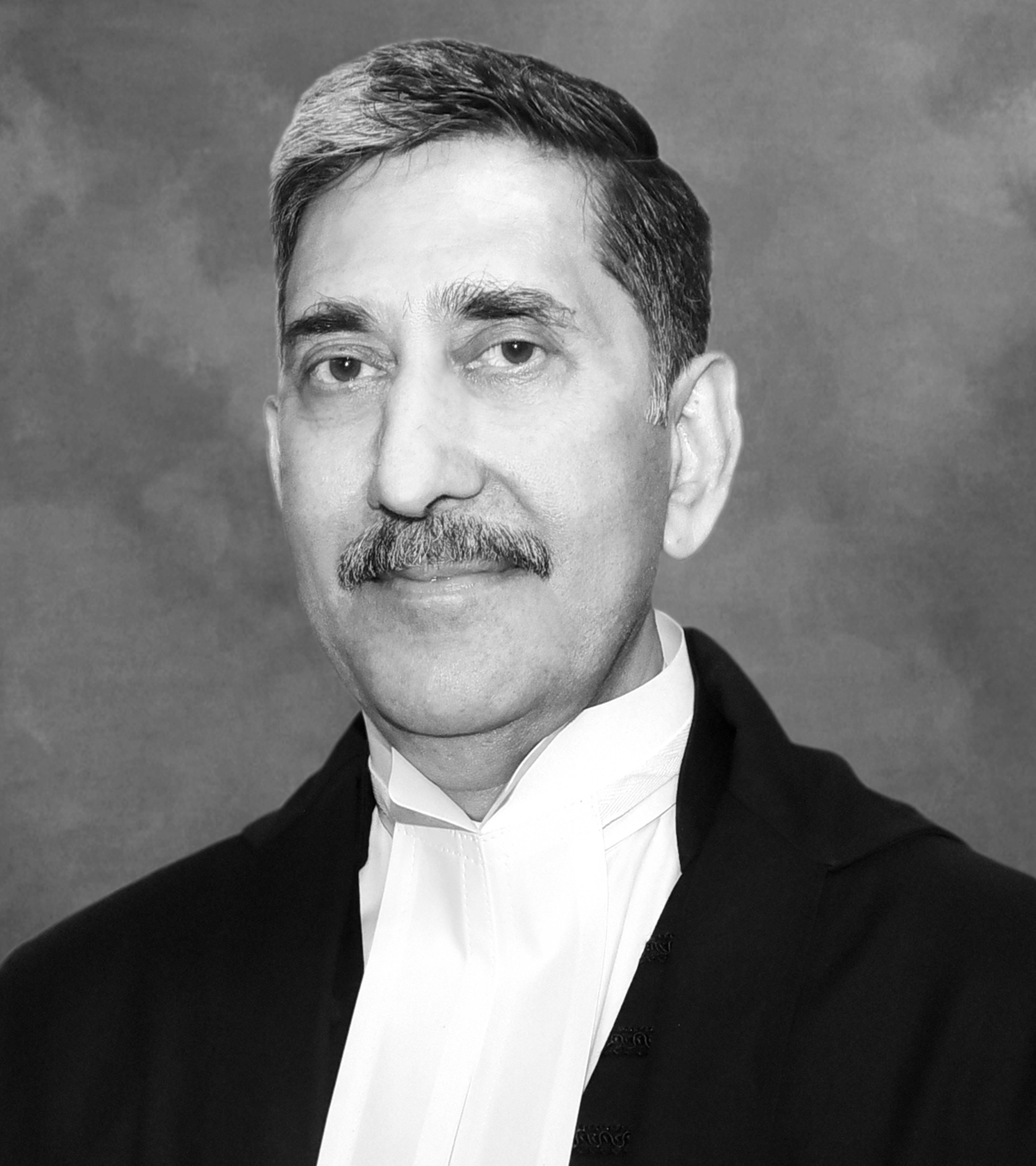

Judge of Supreme Court of India
- Incumbent
- Assumed office 2 June 2026
- Nominated by: Surya Kant
- Appointed by: Droupadi Murmu

49th Chief Justice of Bombay High Court
- In office 5 September 2025 – 1 June 2026
- Nominated by: B. R. Gavai
- Appointed by: Droupadi Murmu
- Preceded by: Alok Aradhe
- Succeeded by: M. C. Tripathi; R. V. Ghuge (acting)
- Judge of Bombay High Court
- In office 21 July 2025 – 4 September 2025; Acting CJ : 29 August 2025 - 4 September 2025
- Nominated by: B. R. Gavai
- Appointed by: Droupadi Murmu

Judge of Rajasthan High Court
- In office 5 July 2024 – 20 July 2025
- Nominated by: D. Y. Chandrachud
- Appointed by: Droupadi Murmu

Judge of Jharkhand High Court
- In office 17 January 2013 – 4 July 2024
- Nominated by: Altamas Kabir
- Appointed by: Pranab Mukherjee
- Acting Chief Justice
- In office 29 December 2023 – 4 July 2024
- Appointed by: Droupadi Murmu
- Preceded by: S. K. Mishra
- Succeeded by: B. R. Sarangi

Personal details
- Born: 20 May 1965 (age 61) Ranchi, Jharkhand
- Education: L.L.B
- Alma mater: Campus Law Centre, Delhi University

Shree Chandrashekhar (born 25 May 1965) is an Indian jurist and currently a judge of the Supreme Court of India since 2 June 2026. He served as the 49th Chief Justice of Bombay High Court. He has also served as a judge of Bombay High Court, Rajasthan High Court and as judge and Acting Chief Justice of Jharkhand High Court.

== Early life ==
Shree was born on 25 May 1965 in Ranchi. He completed his LL.B. from Campus Law Centre, University of Delhi in 1993 and enrolled as an advocate with Delhi State Bar Council on 9 December 1993. He started his practice focusing on both Criminal and Civil matters. For nearly two decades, he practiced in multiple courts, including the Supreme Court, where roughly 140 reported judgments are attributed to his work.

== Career ==
He was appointed as Additional Judge of the Jharkhand High Court at Ranchi on 17 January 2013 and was confirmed as permanent Judge on 27 June 2014. He was appointed as Acting Chief Justice of Jharkhand High Court on 29 December 2023.

He was transferred to the Rajasthan High Court and took oath on 5 July 2024. He was transferred to Bombay High Court and took oath as judge on 21 July 2025 where he also briefly served as Acting Chief Justice before being elevated as Chief Justice of the same High Court.

He was elevated as a Judge of the Supreme Court of India on 2 June 2026.
