= Bhagwati Prasad (judge) =

Indian Judge (1949-2017)

Hon'ble Chief Justice (Retd.) Bhagwati Prasad

Chairperson of Gujarat Human Rights Commission
- In office 4 August 2016 – 19 November 2017
- Appointed by: Om Prakash Kohli

7th Chief Justice of Jharkhand High Court
- In office 22 August 2010 – 12 May 2011
- Nominated by: S. H. Kapadia
- Appointed by: Pratibha Patil
- Preceded by: Gyan Sudha Misra; M. Y. Eqbal (acting); Sushil Harkauli (acting)
- Succeeded by: Prakash Chandra Tatia

Judge of Gujarat High Court
- In office 7 February 2008 – 21 August 2010
- Nominated by: K. G. Balakrishnan
- Appointed by: Pratibha Patil

Judge of Rajasthan High Court
- In office 6 April 1996 – 6 February 2008
- Nominated by: A. M. Ahmadi
- Appointed by: S. D. Sharma

Personal details
- Born: 13 May 1949 Hanumangarh, Rajasthan
- Died: 19 November 2017 (aged 68) Ahmedabad, Gujarat
- Education: B.Sc, LL.B and LL.M
- Alma mater: Dungar College, Jodhpur University, Govt. Post Graduate College, Hisar

Bhagwati Prasad (13 May 1949 – 19 November 2017) was an Indian judge who served as the 7th Chief Justice of Jharkhand High Court. He was also a judge of Gujarat and Rajasthan High Courts.

== Early life ==
He was born on 13 May 1949 at Bahadra, Hanumangarh district of Rajasthan. He passed B.Sc. in 1969 from Govt. Post Graduate College, Hisar and completed LL.B. in 1972 from Dungar College of Bikaner. In 1986, Prasad also passed LL.M. from University of Jodhpur. He was the member of Rotary International and visited USA in 1975.

== Career ==
Prasad was enrolled as an advocate on 2 September 1972 in Rajasthan Bar Council and became the secretary, Rajasthan High Court Advocates Association in 1976. He practiced for 24 years in the Rajasthan High Court. On 6 April 1996 he was appointed a judge of the Rajasthan High Court and on 7 February 2008 he was transferred to the Gujarat High Court. Justice Prasad was elevated as the Chief Justice of Jharkhand High Court on 22 August 2010 and retired on 12 May 2011.

After that he was the chairperson of the Gujarat State Human Rights Commission on 4 August 2016. Justice Prasad died on 19 November 2017 at the age of 68 in Ahmedabad.
