= Dungar College =

College in Rajasthan, India

Coordinates: 28.0110782°N 73.339743°E

- Motto: Vidya Vindate Amritam
- Established: 25 September 1912
- Founder: Ganga Singh
- Principal: Dr. Rajendra Purohit
- Academic staff: All streams available
- Students: 10,000
- Postgraduates: Almost 1000
- Location: Bikaner, Rajasthan, India
- Website: www.dungarcollege.ac.in

Dungar College (formally known as Government Dungar College) is a government-funded educational institution located in Bikaner, Rajasthan, India. Established on 25 September 1912, it is one of the oldest and largest colleges in the Bikaner division, offering undergraduate, postgraduate, and doctoral programs across the arts, science, and commerce streams. Affiliated with Maharaja Ganga Singh University (MGSU), Bikaner, the college has earned recognition for its academic contributions and has been accredited with an 'A' grade by the National Assessment and Accreditation Council (NAAC).

== History ==
Govt. Dungar College in Bikaner, originally named The Darbar School, was founded in 1873 by Maharaja Dungar Singh, the 20th ruler of the former Bikaner state. After his death, his brother Ganga Singh upgraded it to Dungar Memorial College on 25 September 1912. College-level education began in 1928, followed by degree courses in 1937, when it also separated from Sardul School. Science faculty for intermediates started in 1940 with Physics and Chemistry, expanding to degree-level Science, law and postgraduate studies in Hindi, Sanskrit, English, History and Economics by 1942. By 1951, it was one of Rajasthan's five postgraduate colleges.

Relocating to its current building in 1962, the college introduced M.Sc. in Physics and Chemistry, followed by Zoology, Botany, and LLM in 1970. It later added postgraduate programs in Geography, Sociology, Economics, Geology and Urdu. From 1988 to 1995, it held autonomous status and in 1996–97, the commerce faculty was launched. Today, it is a leading institution in Rajasthan, offering 22 subjects at graduate and postgraduate levels, 10 at M.Phil., and Ph.D. research across Arts, Science, and Commerce.

== Notable persons ==
=== Alumni ===
- Arjun Ram Meghwal: union minister of Law and Justice and minister of state for Parliamentary Affairs
- Bhagwati Prasad: former Chief Justice of the Jharkhand High Court
- Bulaki Das Kalla: former cabinet minister in Government of Rajasthan
- Mohammed Usman Arif, former Governor of Uttar Pradesh
- Narpat Singh Rajvi: former five term member of the Rajasthan Legislative Assembly
- Rajendra Singh Rathore: former cabinet minister in Government of Rajasthan
- Ram Narayan Bishnoi: former cabinet minister in Government of Rajasthan
- Sagat Singh – Indian Army officer (1919–2001)
- O. K. Harsh, Multidisciplinary International Scientist and Educational Administrator (Former-VC and Pro-VC).

=== Faculty ===
- Shyam Sunder Jyani - Associate professor of sociology and environmentalist
