= Daya Saran Sinha =

Indian Judge

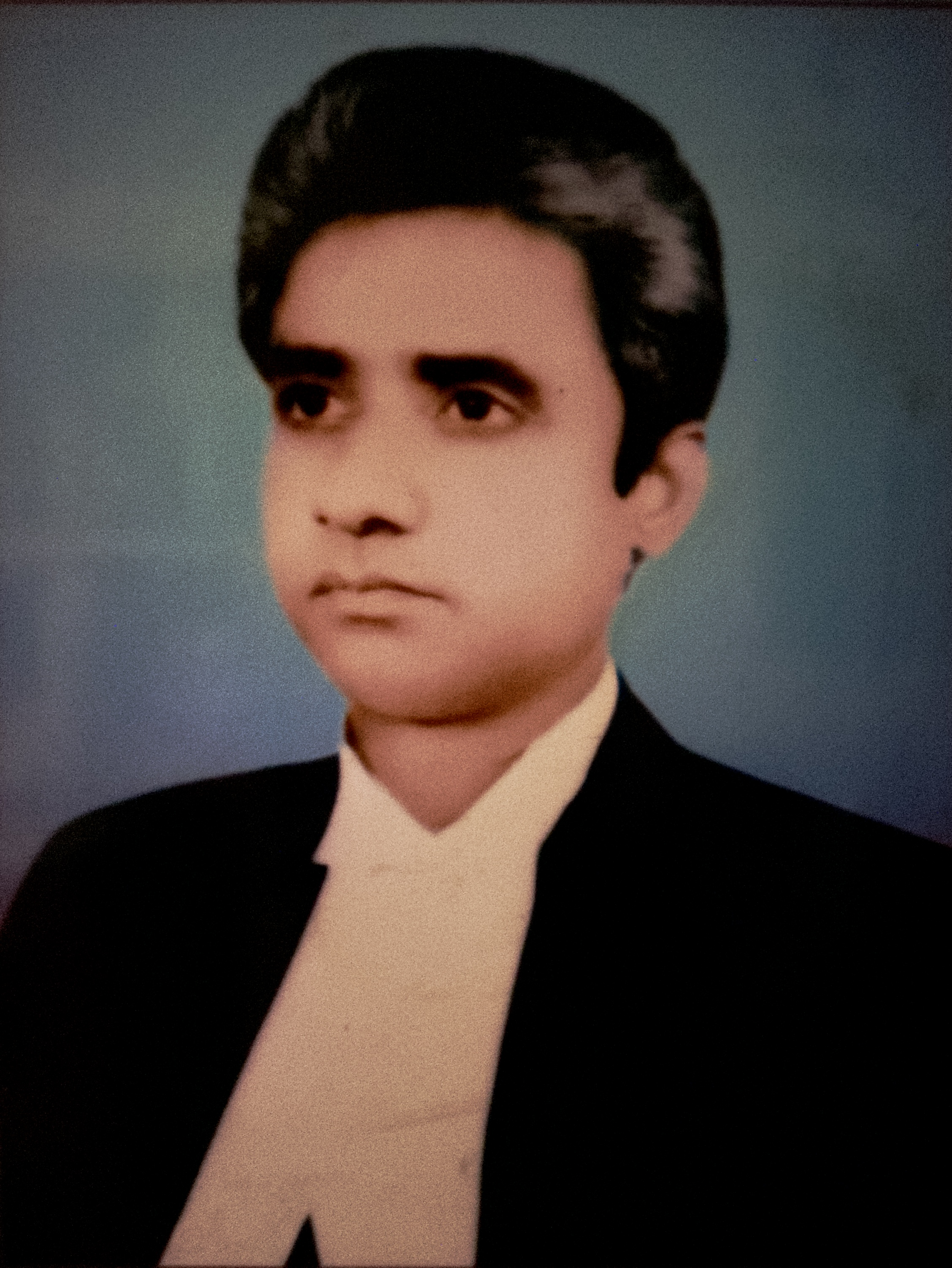
- D.S. Sinha as an Advocate

18th Chief Justice of Gujarat High Court
- In office 17 March 2002 – 18 March 2003
- Nominated by: Bhupinder Nath Kirpal
- Appointed by: K. R. Narayanan
- Preceded by: D. M. Dharmadhikari
- Succeeded by: Bhawani Singh

1st Chairman of Gujarat State Human Rights Commission
- In office 13 September 2006 – 14 September 2011
- Nominated by: Narendra Modi
- Appointed by: Nawal Kishore Sharma
- Preceded by: None
- Succeeded by: J.N. Bhatt

Judge of the Allahabad High Court
- In office 17 March 1986 – 17 March 2002
- Nominated by: Prafullachandra Natwarlal Bhagwati
- Appointed by: Zail Singh

Personal details
- Born: 18 March 1941 Lakhimpur Kheri
- Died: 23 October 2023 (aged 82) Max Healthcare, Saket, New Delhi
- Education: Allahabad University

Daya Saran Sinha (18 March 1941—23 October 2023) was an Indian judge and the eighteenth chief justice of the Gujarat High Court. He also served as the first chairperson of the Gujarat State Human Rights Commission.

== Early life and education ==
Sinha was born on 18 March 1941. His father was an officer under the British government. He attended Gomti Inter College in Phulpur, near Allahabad (now Prayagraj). He graduated with a Bachelor of Arts and Bachelor of Laws from the University of Allahabad in 1957 and 1959, respectively.

== Career ==
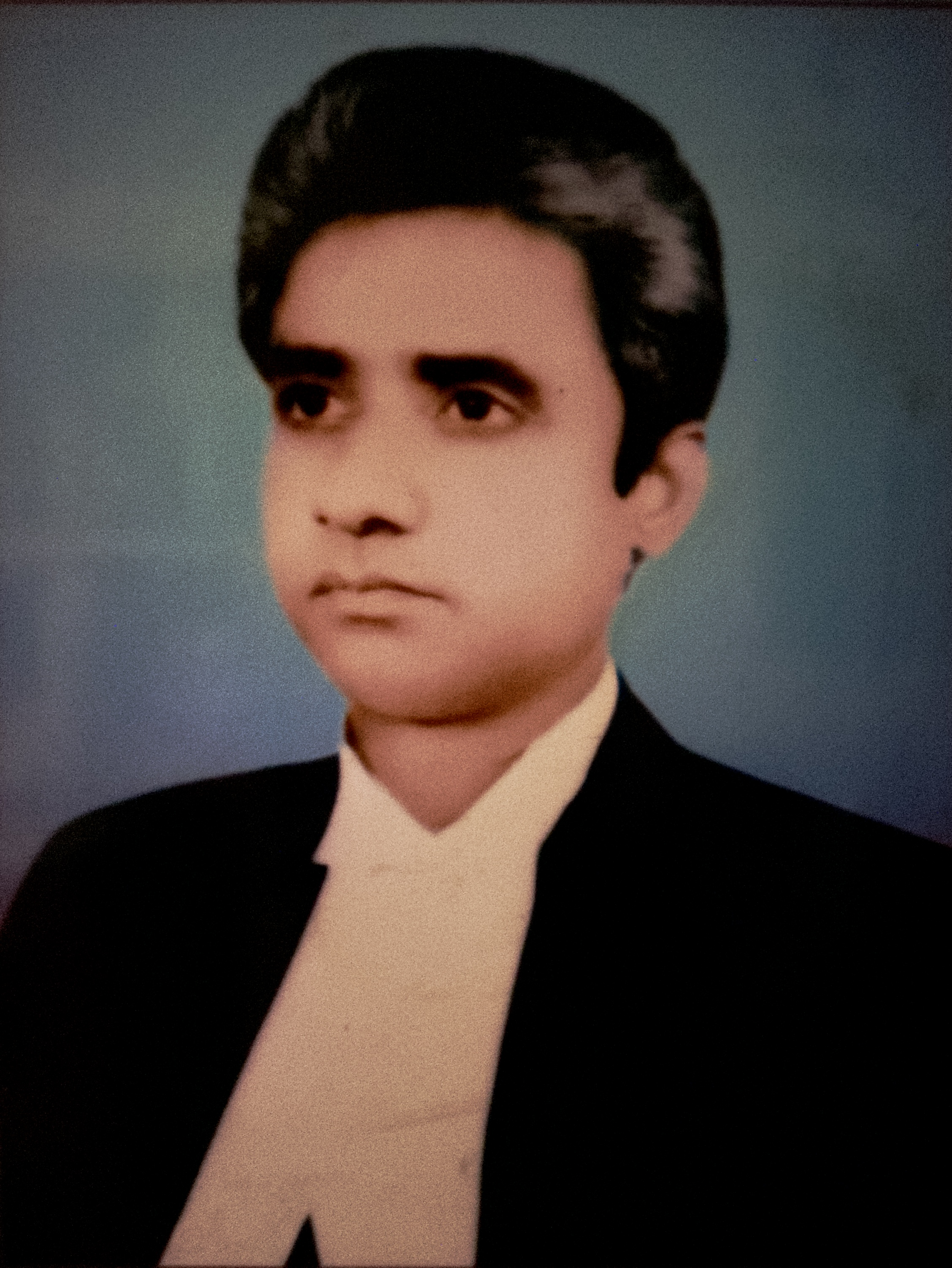
Sinha as an advocate

After law school, Sinha enrolled as a pleader in 1959. He became an advocate in 1962, and started his practice in the Allahabad High Court and Supreme Court of India on Civil, Company, Tax and Constitutional matters. He worked as a member of the Allahabad High Court as a Legal Aid, Standing Counsel, and Additional Chief Standing Counsel in Uttar Pradesh. Sinha also appeared as a Senior Counsel of the Eastern Railways and many statutory bodies in Uttar Pradesh .

He was appointed a judge of Allahabad High Court on 17 March 1986. On 17 March 2002, he was elevated as chief justice of the Gujarat High Court; he held the office until 18 March 2003. Sinha ruled on four cases during his time as chief justice of the Gujarat High Court.

Sinha served as the first chairperson of the Gujarat State Human Rights Commission from 2006 to 2011. He received an honorary doctorate of literature from Seventh-day Adventist College in 2011, issued by Kamla Beniwal, the then-governor of Gujarat.

After retirement, Sinha became the national president of the Rule of Law Society. He was also the chairman of the management committee of Bhavan's Mehta School and College.

== Personal life ==
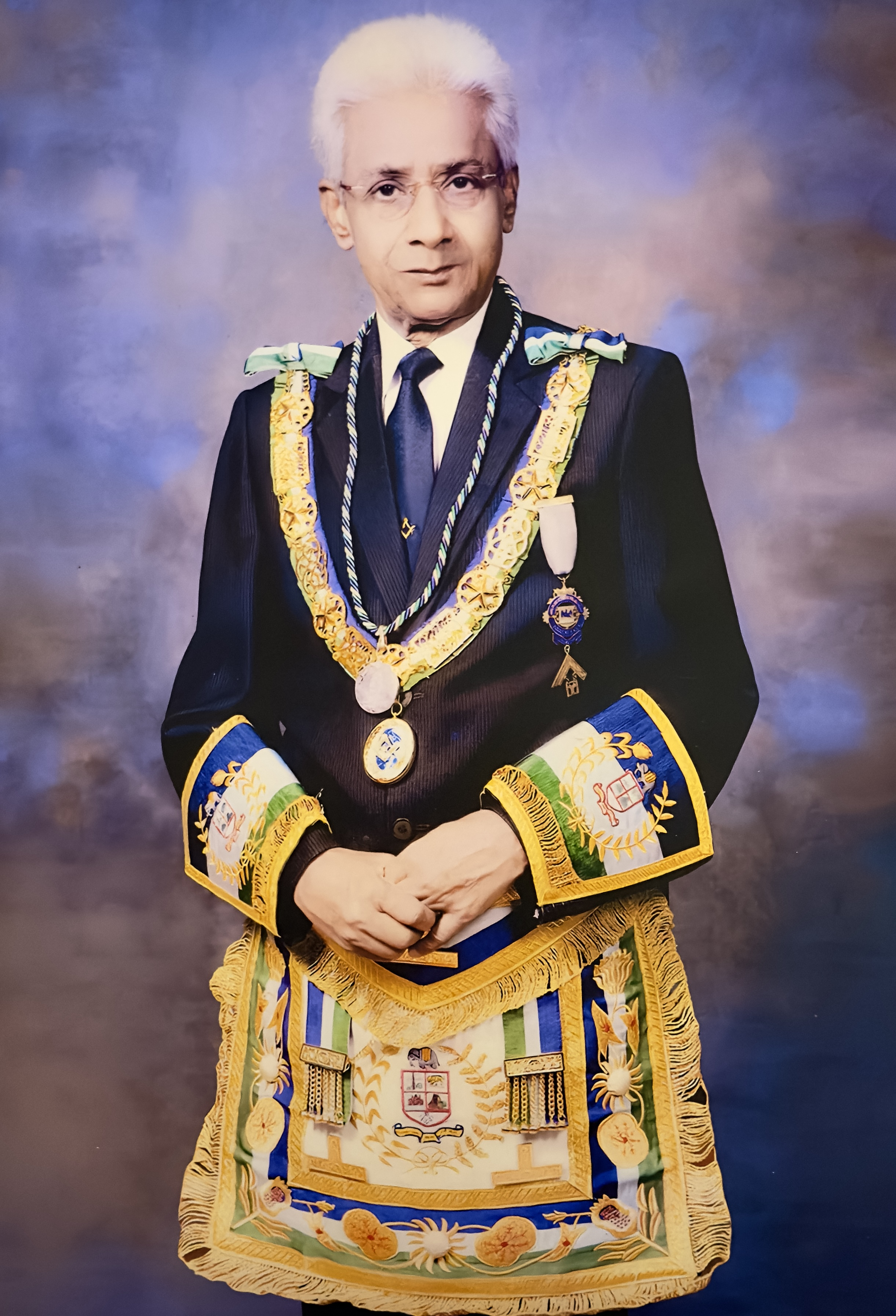
Sinha in his jewels and regalia (uniform of the masonic temple)

On 18 February 1970, Sinha was initiated in the Masonic temple of Allahabad. He was a member until his death. He held the ranks of past deputy grand master and past deputy regional grand master. He also held the title of Right Worshipful Brother gained from the Grand Lodge of India.

== Death and legacy ==
Sinha died at Max Hospital, Saket, New Delhi on 23 October 2023. His body was brought back to Allahabad to his residence for cremation. Last rites were performed with full state honours on 24 October, at Rasulabad Ghat. His cremains were immersed in the Ganges at Sangam, and flags of the district were directed to be flown at half mast.
