= R. Banumathi =

Former Judge of Supreme Court of India (2014-2020)

Hon'ble Justice (Retd.) R. Banumathi
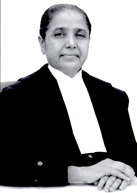

Judge of Supreme Court of India
- In office 13 August 2014 – 19 July 2020
- Nominated by: R. M. Lodha
- Appointed by: Pranab Mukherjee

9th Chief Justice of Jharkhand High Court
- In office 16 November 2013 – 13 August 2014
- Nominated by: P. Sathasivam
- Appointed by: Pranab Mukherjee
- Preceded by: P. C. Tatia; D. N. Patel (acting)
- Succeeded by: Virender Singh; D. N. Patel (acting)

Judge of the Madras High Court
- In office 3 April 2003 – 15 November 2013
- Nominated by: V. N. Khare
- Appointed by: A. P. J. Abdul Kalam

Personal details
- Born: 20 July 1955 (age 71) Uthangarai, Tamil Nadu

R. Banumathi (born 20 July 1955) is a former judge of the Supreme Court of India. She is from Tamil Nadu and the sixth woman to be a judge of the Supreme Court of India. Earlier, she served as the chief justice of the Jharkhand High Court and judge of the Madras High Court. She also served as the chancellor of Maharashtra National Law University, Aurangabad.

== Career ==
Banumathi enrolled as advocate on 7 January 1981 and started practice in mofussil courts in Tamil Nadu. She joined Tamil Nadu Higher Judicial Service in 1988 as a direct recruit district judge. As a sessions judge, she headed the one-person commission on police excess by Special Task Force in Chinnampathy, Coimbatore district in 1995–96.

On 3 April 2003, she was elevated as a judge of the Madras High Court. She dealt with the case on banning Jallikattu or bull hugging sport. In November 2013, she was transferred to the Jharkhand High Court as chief justice of that court. In August 2014, she was elevated to the Supreme Court of India after her name had been recommended for the post by the collegium headed by then Chief Justice R. M. Lodha.

She retired from Supreme Court of India on 19 July 2020 after completing near six year tenure.

== Legacy ==
She is best remembered for her landmark judgement in 2012 Delhi gang rape and murder, famously known as Nirbhaya Gangrape and murder case, in which the bench headed by her announced death penalty for four convicts who were hanged on 20 March 2020.

She also became the only second female member of supreme court collegium after retirement of Ruma Pal in 2006. She became only the second woman sessions judge to rise to the country's highest court.
