= Bidyut Ranjan Sarangi =

Chief Justice of Jharkhand High Court

Hon'ble Chief Justice (Retd.) Bidyut Ranjan Sarangi
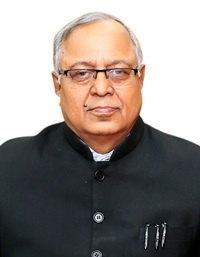

Member of National Human Rights Commission of India
- Incumbent
- Assumed office 30 December 2024
- Appointed by: Droupadi Murmu
- Chairperson: V. Ramasubramanian

15th Chief Justice of Jharkhand High Court
- In office 5 July 2024 – 19 July 2024
- Nominated by: Dhananjaya Y. Chandrachud
- Appointed by: Droupadi Murmu
- Preceded by: Sanjaya Kumar Mishra
- Succeeded by: M. S. Ramachandra Rao

Judge of Orissa High Court
- In office 20 June 2013 – 4 July 2024
- Nominated by: Altamas Kabir
- Appointed by: Pranab Mukherjee

Personal details
- Born: 20 July 1962 (age 64) Nayagarh, Odisha
- Spouse: Mrs. Nirupama Sarangi
- Children: Dr. Debarchita; Debasmita
- Education: Buxi Jagabandhu Bidyadhar College; Madhusudan Law College

Bidyut Ranjan Sarangi (born 20 July 1962) is an Indian judge who is currently serving as a Member of National Human Rights Commission of India. He is a former Chief Justice of Jharkhand High Court and a former Judge of Orissa High Court.
