= Saurabh Kirpal =

Indian lawyer, writer and activist

Saurabh Kirpal (born 18 April 1972) is an Indian lawyer, author and a senior advocate at the Delhi High Court. He is also an LGBTQ rights activist.

== Personal life and education ==
Saurabh Kirpal was born to B N Kirpal, former Chief Justice of India and Aruna Kirpal (née Sachdev). He has 2 siblings.

Kirpal graduated with a degree in Physics from the St. Stephen's College, Delhi. He then went to the Oxford University to get an undergraduate degree in law. He has also earned a master's degree from Cambridge University.

Kirpal has been in a relationship with his partner Nicolas Germain Bachmann for the past 20 years. Nicolas is a European and works at the Swiss Federal Department of Foreign Affairs in New Delhi. He is also a Swiss human rights activist.

== Career ==
Kirpal briefly worked at the United Nations in Geneva before returning to India. Since then, he has been practising at the Supreme Court for more than two decades. He was also the counsel for Navtej Singh Johar & Ors. v. Union of India that led to the landmark reading down of Section 377 of the Indian Penal Code in 2018, thus decriminalising homosexual acts. He is also a board member of the Naz Foundation Trust, a Delhi-based NGO which is opposed to Section 377. He has also worked under former Attorney General Mukul Rohatgi. He was elevated as a senior advocate in March 2021. Additionally, Kirpal is also a board member of the Naz Foundation (India) Trust.

He has written an anthology titled “Sex and the Supreme Court: How the Law is Upholding the Dignity of the Indian Citizen” (2020) and "Fifteen Judgments: Cases that Shaped India’s Financial Landscape" (2022).

Kirpal is currently recommended to be elevated to High Court judge in Delhi, which will make him the first openly gay judge in India. However, his nomination has been continually delayed by the Ministry of Law and Justice since his name was given in 2017, despite the Supreme Court of India having held four debates on the matter and recommending him in November 2021. In January 2023, the Supreme Court of India confirmed previous reporting that the ministry had stalled his nomination on the basis of his sexual orientation and relationship with Bachmann, claiming that it would make him "biased" when ruling on cases related to LGBT rights and that his partnership with a foreign national was a security threat, despite India's Research and Analysis Wing (R&AW) having investigated him twice and found no such evidence. The court again recommended that Kirpal be nominated, stating that Kirpal's openness about his sexuality was a "credit" and would promote diversity, calling his conduct "above board", and stating that his partner would not inhibit Kirpal's loyalty, pointing out that other high officials had married foreign nationals. The statement was hailed by LGBT rights activists, who criticized the central government for holding back Kirpal's nomination. Manish Tewari, a Congress MP, also questioned why R&AW was investigating Kirpal and his partner, stating that it was outside their "external remit" to investigate residents of India and their sexual orientation.

== See also ==
- Navtej Singh Johar
- LGBT rights in India
