= Madhusudan Law University =

Law University in Cuttack, Odisha

- Motto: धर्मो रक्षति रक्षितः (Sanskrit)
- Motto in English: Dharma protects the protector.
- Type: Public
- Established: 10 March 1869; 157 years ago (as Law College); 28 April 2021; 5 years ago (as University)
- Affiliations: BCI, UGC
- Chancellor: Governor of Odisha
- Vice-Chancellor: Sibaram Tripathy
- Location: Cuttack, Odisha, India; 20°27′59″N 85°53′46″E
- Campus: Urban
- Website: mlu.ac.in

Madhusudan Law University formerly Madhusudan Law College is the oldest legal education institution (now a university) of the state of Odisha, India. The university is situated at Municipal Colony in Cuttack in Odisha. It offers 3 years LL.B.(Hons.), 5 years Integrated B.A., LL.B.(Hons) and 2 years LL.M. course approved from Bar Council of India (BCI). It is a teaching-cum-affiliating university.

The Governor of Odisha serves as the Chancellor of the University.

== History ==
In 1869 the law course was introduced in the Ravenshaw Collegiate School, Cuttack. thereafter it continued in the Ravenshaw College. That time the Bachelor of Law course was under the University of Calcutta and after the foundation of Utkal University in 1943 the Madhusudan Law College was also established in the same year. This college is named after National Leader and politician Madhusudan Das.

From 28 April 2021 all government and private law colleges of Odisha, other than constituent law colleges will be affiliated under Madhusudan Law University. Prof. (Dr.) Kamal Jeet Singh served as the university's first Vice-Chancellor from 2021 to 2026.

== Notable alumni ==
- Dipak Misra, former Chief Justice of India
- Gopal Ballav Pattanaik, former Chief Justice of India
- Ananga Kumar Patnaik, former Judge, Supreme Court of India
- Pradip Kumar Mohanty, Former Chief Justice of Jharkhand High Court
- Narasingha Mishra, Former Law Minister and Member of the Law Commission
- Gobinda Chandra Majhi, eminent writer
- Pratap Jena, former Cabinet Minister of Odisha
- Ainthu Sahoo, former Member of Parliament in Lok Sabha
- Rabi Ray, former Speaker of the Lok Sabha
- Gopanarayan Das, former Member of Odisha Legislative Assembly
- Subhash Singh, Former Member of Parliament and First directly elected Mayor of Cuttack.
