= Jharkhand High Court =

High Court of Jharkhand

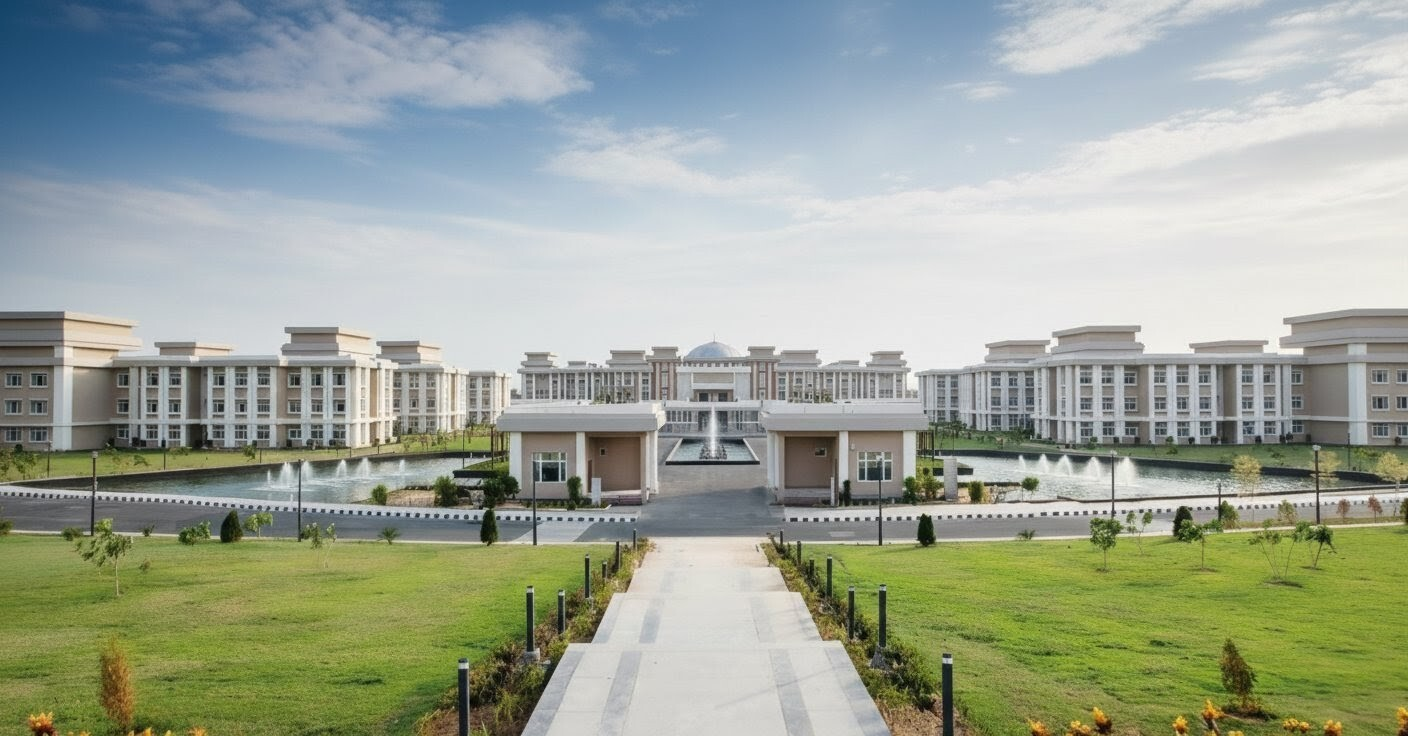
- Jharkhand High Court building
- Interactive map of Jharkhand High Court
- 23.3144°N 85.2700°E
- Established: 15 November 2000; 26 years ago
- Jurisdiction: Jharkhand
- Location: Ranchi, Jharkhand
- Coordinates: 23.3144°N 85.2700°E
- Composition method: Presidential appointment with confirmation of the Chief Justice of India and Governor of respective state.
- Authorised by: Constitution of India
- Appeals to: Supreme Court of India
- Judge term length: Mandatory retirement at age 62
- Number of positions: 25
- Website: jharkhandhighcourt.nic.in

Chief Justice
- Currently: M. S. Sonak
- Since: 9 January 2026

Jharkhand High Court is the High Court for the Indian state of Jharkhand. It was established on 15 November 2000, following the bifurcation of the state of Bihar and succeeded the jurisdiction previously exercised by the Patna High Court over the region. Since 24 May 2023, the High Court has been functioning from a newly constructed complex at Dhurwa, Ranchi, which was inaugurated by President Droupadi Murmu. The campus is spread across 165 acres, making it the largest High Court complex in India by area.

== History ==
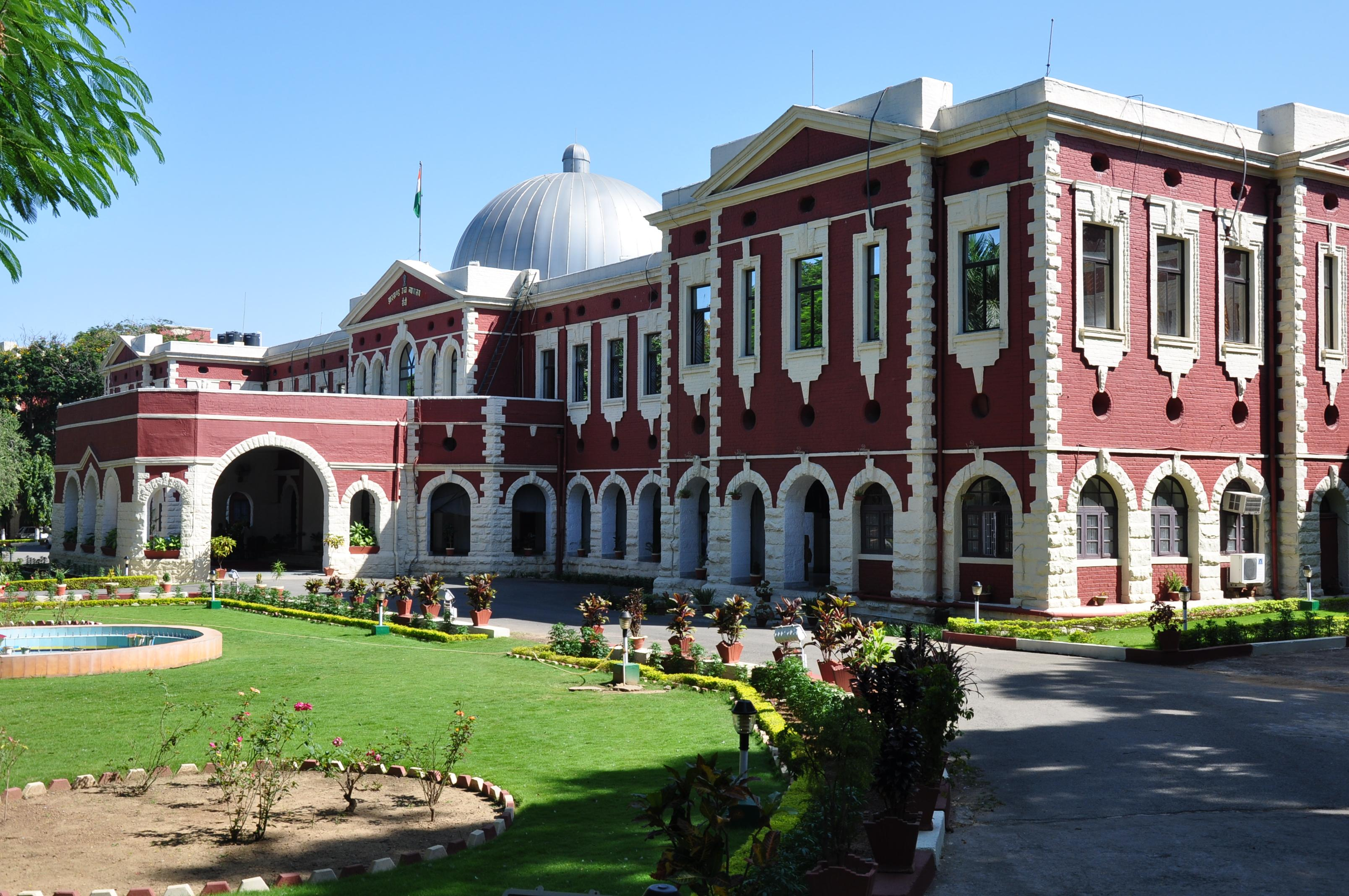
Old building of Jharkhand High Court at Doranda, Ranchi

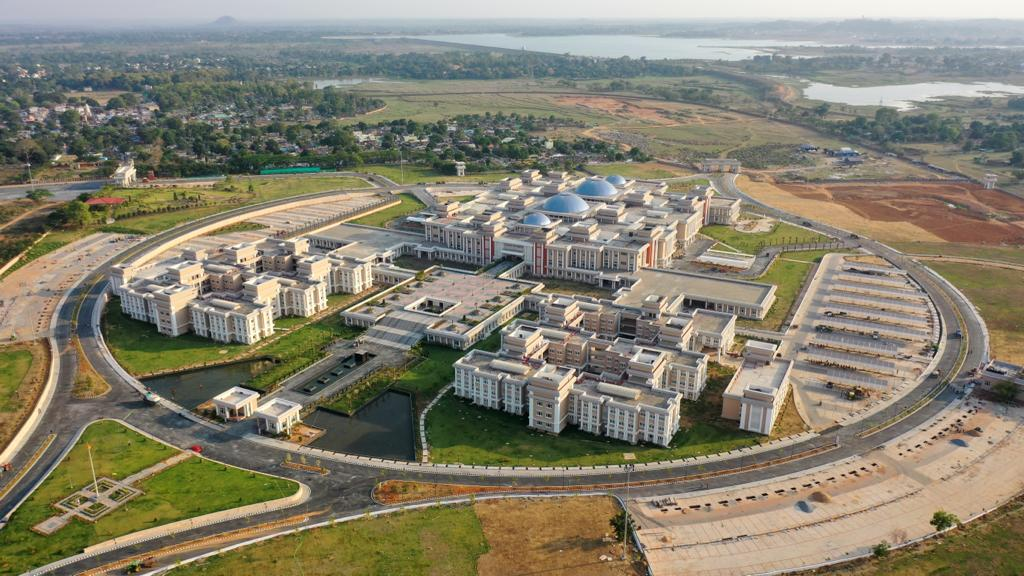
Aerial view of the new Jharkhand High Court building, functioning since 24 May 2023

A circuit bench of the Patna High Court was established at Ranchi on 6 March 1972 under clause 36 of the letters patent of the Patna High Court. The circuit bench became the permanent bench of the Patna High Court, by the High Court at Patna (Establishment of Permanent Bench at Ranchi) Act 1976 (Act 57 of 1976) on 8 April 1976. This permanent bench finally became the Jharkhand High Court on reorganisation of Bihar state on 15 November 2000, under the Bihar Reorganisation Act, 2000.

In 2013, the Government of Jharkhand approved plans for a new High Court complex at Dhurwa, Ranchi, in view of the growing caseload and limited capacity of the old building at Doranda. Construction began in 2015 on an area of about 165 acres, of which 72 acres were earmarked for the main court complex. The foundation stone was laid with the aim of creating a modern judicial infrastructure and work continued for nearly eight years.

The new building of the Jharkhand High Court was inaugurated by the President of India, Droupadi Murmu, on 24 May 2023 in the presence of the Chief Justice of India, D.Y. Chandrachud, and other dignitaries. Spread over 165 acres, it is the largest High Court complex in India by area. The project was built at an estimated cost of around ₹550 crore for construction, while including land acquisition and associated facilities, the overall cost has been estimated at close to ₹1,000 crore.

The main structure contains 25 air-conditioned courtrooms with adjoining judges’ chambers, ante rooms and waiting areas. The Chief Justice’s block includes a video conference hall, kitchen, dining area and a large conference room. For the Bar, the complex provides two large halls with a combined capacity of 1,660 advocates, 76 senior advocate chambers with attached toilets and pantries, 369 additional lawyer chambers, recreation halls for men and women, clerks’ halls and a bar room. The central lobby measures nearly 14,000 square feet.

Supporting infrastructure includes 12 conference rooms, registrar chambers, offices for the Advocate General and public prosecutors, auditoriums, committee halls, typist blocks, dispensaries, barracks and two canteens. The complex also provides parking space for about 2,000 vehicles and is under surveillance with more than 500 CCTV cameras. Built with sustainable features, the new campus has a 2,000 KVA solar system that supplies about 40% of its power needs, a sewage treatment plant of 200 KLD capacity to recycle water, and more than 4,400 trees planted within the grounds. The entire facility is designed as a modern judicial hub combining functionality, security, and environmental sustainability.

== Chief Justice and Judges ==
Jharkhand High Court is permitted to have a maximum of 25 judges of which 20 may be permanently appointed and 5 may be additionally appointed. Currently, it has 15 judges.

Justice Mahesh Sharadchandra Sonak is the current Chief Justice of the Jharkhand High Court, having assumed office on 9 January 2026.

== List of Former Chief Justices ==
No.	Chief Justice	Term start	Term end
Patna High Court
1	Sir Thomas Fredrick Dawson Miller	31 October 1917	31 March 1928
2	Sir Courtney Terrell	31 March 1928	6 May 1938
3	Sir Arther Trevor Harries	10 October 1938	19 January 1943
4	Sir Syed Fazl Ali	19 January 1943	14 October 1946
5	Sir Clifford Monmohan Agarwala	9 January 1948	24 January 1950
6	Sir Herbert Ribton Meredith	25 January 1950	8 April 1950
7	Pandit Lakshami Kant Jha	8 April 1950	1 June 1952
8	David Ezra Reuben	1 June 1952	2 September 1953
9	Syed Jafar Imam	3 September 1953	10 January 1955
10	Sudhansu Kumar Das	10 January 1955	30 April 1956
11	Vaidyanathier Ramaswami	30 April 1956	4 January 1965
12	Ramaswamy Lakshmi Narasimhan	4 January 1965	2 August 1968
13	Satish Chandra Mishra	9 November 1968	5 September 1970
14	Ujjal Narayan Sinha	5 September 1970	29 September 1972
15	Nand Lall Untwalia	29 September 1972	3 October 1974
16	Shyam Nandan Prasad Singh	3 October 1974	1 May 1976
17	Krishna Ballabh Narayan Singh	19 July 1976	12 March 1982
18	Surjit Singh Sandhawalia	29 November 1983	27 July 1987
19	Bhagwati Prasad Jha	2 January 1988	2 January 1988
20	Dipak Kumar Sen	1 May 1988	1 May 1989
21	Shushil Kumar Jha	19 October 1989	23 October 1989
22	Gangadhar Ganesh Sohani	24 October 1989	17 December 1990
23	Bimal Chandra Basak	18 March 1991	21 October 1994
24	K. S. Paripoornan	24 January 1994	11 June 1994
25	K. Venkataswamy	19 September 1994	6 March 1995
26	G.P. Patnaik	19 May 1995	11 September 1995
27	D.P. Wadhwa	29 September 1995	21 March 1997
28	B.M. Lal	29 September 1995	6 October 1999
29	Ravi S. Dhavan	6 October 1999	15 November 2000

#	Portrait	Chief Justice	Term start	Term end
Jharkhand High Court
1		Vinod Kumar Gupta	5 December 2000	4 March 2003
2		P. K. Balasubramanyan	10 March 2003	26 August 2004
--		S. J. Mukhopadhaya	26 August 2004	28 February 2005
3		Altamas Kabir	1 March 2005	8 September 2005
4		Nelavoy Dhinakar	4 December 2005	9 June 2006
--		S. J. Mukhopadhaya	10 June 2006	16 September 2006
--		M.Y. Eqbal	17 September 2006	17 September 2006
5		M. Karpaga Vinayagam	17 September 2006	15 May 2008
6		Gyan Sudha Misra	13 July 2008	30 April 2010
--		Sushil Harkauli	1 May 2010	21 August 2010
7		Bhagwati Prasad	22 August 2010	12 May 2011
--		Prakash Chandra Tatia	13 May 2011	10 September 2011
8		Prakash Chandra Tatia	11 September 2011	3 August 2013
--		Dhirubhai Naranbhai Patel	4 August 2013	15 November 2013
9		R. Banumathi	16 November 2013	12 August 2014
--		Dhirubhai Naranbhai Patel	13 August 2014	31 October 2014
10		Virender Singh	1 November 2014	6 October 2016
--		Pradip Kumar Mohanty	7 October 2016	23 March 2017
11		Pradip Kumar Mohanty	24 March 2017	9 June 2017
--		Dhirubhai Naranbhai Patel	10 June 2017	10 August 2018
12		Aniruddha Bose	11 August 2018	23 May 2019
--		Dhirubhai Naranbhai Patel	24 May 2019	6 June 2019
--		Prashant Kumar	7 June 2019	30 August 2019
--		Harish Chandra Mishra	30 August 2019	16 November 2019
13		Ravi Ranjan	17 November 2019	19 December 2022
--		Aparesh Kumar Singh	20 December 2022	19 February 2023
14		Sanjaya Kumar Mishra	20 February 2023	28 December 2023
--		Shree Chandrashekhar	29 December 2023	4 July 2024
15		Bidyut Ranjan Sarangi	5 July 2024	19 July 2024
--		Sujit Narayan Prasad	20 July 2024	24 September 2024
16		M. S. Ramachandra Rao	25 September 2024	21 July 2025
--		Sujit Narayan Prasad	22 July 2025	22 July 2025
17		Tarlok Singh Chauhan	23 July 2025	8 January 2026
18		M. S. Sonak	9 January 2026	Incumbent

== Judges elevated as Chief Justices ==
This sections contains list of only those judges elevated as chief justices whose parent high court is Jharkhand. This includes those judges who, at the time of appointment as chief justice, may not be serving in Jharkhand High Court but this list does not include judges who at the time of appointment as chief justice were serving in Jharkhand High Court but does not have Jharkhand as their Parent High Court.

Colour Key

- Female Chief Justice
- Served as Chief Justice of India

Symbol Key

- ^{‡} Elevated to Supreme Court of India
- ^{RES} Resigned
- ^{†} Died in office

Name	Image	Appointed as CJ in HC of	Date of appointment		Date of retirement (Note: this includes date of resignation, death and elevation to supreme court)	Tenure	
Name	Image	Appointed as CJ in HC of	As Judge	As Chief Justice	Date of retirement	As Chief Justice	As Judge (Note: also includes tenure as Chief Justice)
Mokhtarajama Yusuf Eqbal		Madras	9 May 1996 (Note: He was initially appointed as judge in Patna High Court but after establishment of Jharkhand High Court on 15 November 2000, he opted for Jharkhand High Court as his parent high court)	11 June 2010	23 December 2012^{[‡]}	2 years, 196 days	16 years, 229 days
Rakesh Ranjan Prasad		Manipur	27 February 2006	22 September 2016	30 June 2017	282 days	11 years, 124 days
Aparesh Kumar Singh		Tripura, transferred to Telangana	24 January 2012	17 April 2023	5 October 2026^{[‡]}	3 years, 172 days	14 years, 255 days
Shree Chandrashekhar		Bombay	17 January 2013	5 September 2025	1 June 2026^{[‡]}	270 days	13 years, 136 days

=== Judges appointed as Acting Chief Justice ===
Name	Appointed as ACJ in HC of	Date of appointment as Judge	Period as Acting Chief Justice	Date of retirement	Tenure as ACJ	Tenure as Judge	Remarks	Ref..
M. Y. Eqbal	Jharkhand	9 May 1996	29 Aug 2006 – 16 Sep 2006	23 December 2012^{[‡]}	19 days	16 years, 229 days	--	
M. Y. Eqbal	Jharkhand	9 May 1996	16 May 2008 – 12 Jul 2008	23 December 2012^{[‡]}	58 days	16 years, 229 days	--	
M. Y. Eqbal	Jharkhand	9 May 1996	1 May 2010 – 10 Jun 2010	23 December 2012^{[‡]}	41 days	16 years, 229 days	Elevated as CJ of Madras	
R. R. Prasad	Manipur	27 February 2006	10 Jun 2016 – 21 Sep 2016	30 June 2017	104 days	11 years, 124 days	Became permanent	
Prashant Kumar	Jharkhand	21 January 2009	7 Jun 2019 – 30 Aug 2019	30 August 2019^{[†]}	85 days	10 years, 222 days	Died in office	
H. C. Mishra	Jharkhand	27 April 2011	30 Aug 2019 – 16 Nov 2019	26 March 2021	79 days	9 years, 334 days	--	
A. K. Singh	Jharkhand	24 January 2012	20 Dec 2022 – 19 Feb 2023	5 October 2026^{[‡]}	62 days	14 years, 255 days	--	
Shree Chandrashekhar	Jharkhand	17 January 2013	29 Dec 2023 – 4 Jul 2024	1 June 2026^{[‡]}	189 days	13 years, 136 days	Transferred to Rajasthan	
Shree Chandrashekhar	Bombay	17 January 2013	29 Aug 2025 – 4 Sep 2025	1 June 2026^{[‡]}	7 days	13 years, 136 days	Became permanent	
S. N. Prasad	Jharkhand	26 September 2014	20 Jul 2024 – 24 Sep 2024	Incumbent	67 days	12 years, 58 days	--	
S. N. Prasad	Jharkhand	26 September 2014	22 Jul 2025	Incumbent	1 day	12 years, 58 days	--	

== Judges elevated to Supreme Court ==
This section includes the list of only those judges whose parent high court was Jharkhand. This includes those judges who, at the time of elevation to Supreme Court of India, may not be serving in Jharkhand High Court but this list does not include judges who at the time of elevation were serving in Jharkhand High Court but does not have Jharkhand as their Parent High Court.

Colour Key

- Female Judge
- Served as Chief Justice of India

Symbol Key

- ^{RES} Resigned
- ^{†} Died in office

#	Name of the Judge	Image	Date of Appointment		Date of Retirement	Tenure			Immediately preceding office
#	Name of the Judge	Image	In Parent High Court	In Supreme Court	Date of Retirement	In High Court(s)	In Supreme Court	Total tenure (Note: Includes both tenure as High Court Judge as well as Supreme Court Judge)	Immediately preceding office
1	Mokhtarajama Yusuf Eqbal		9 May 1996	24 December 2012	12 February 2016	16 years, 229 days	3 years, 51 days	19 years, 280 days	36th CJ of Madras HC
2	Shree Chandrashekhar		17 January 2013	2 June 2026	Incumbent	13 years, 136 days	174 days	13 years, 310 days	49th CJ of Bombay HC
3	Aparesh Kumar Singh		24 January 2012	6 October 2026	Incumbent	14 years, 255 days	48 days	14 years, 303 days	7th CJ of Telangana HC

== Judges of Jharkhand High Court who served as Chief Justice of India ==
CJIs whose Parent High Court was not Jharkhand but they served in Jharkhand
#	Name of the Chief Justice	Image	Date of Appointment as Chief Justice	Date of Retirement	Tenure	Appointed By	Date of elevation to Supreme Court Nominated by	Total tenure in Supreme Court (including as CJI)	Tenure in Jharkhand High Court	Immediately preceding office
1	Altamas Kabir		29 September 2012	18 July 2013	293 days	Pranab Mukherjee	9 September 2005 Ramesh Chandra Lahoti	7 years, 314 days	1 May 2005 – 8 September 2005 (130 days)	Chief Justice of Jharkhand High Court
