= S. Rajendra Babu =

34th Chief Justice of India

Justice S. Rajendra Babu
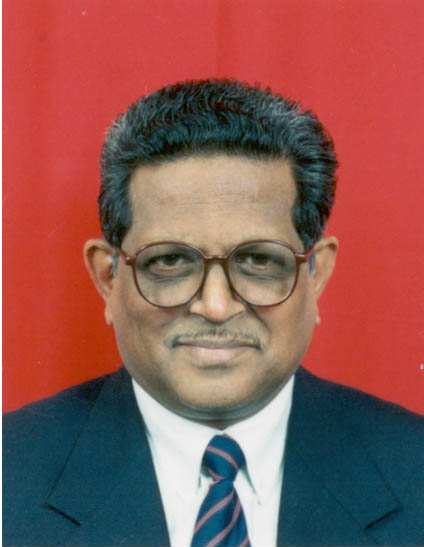
- In 2004

34th Chief Justice of India
- In office 2 May 2004 – 1 June 2004
- Appointed by: A. P. J. Abdul Kalam
- Preceded by: V. N. Khare
- Succeeded by: Ramesh Chandra Lahoti

Chairman National Human Rights Commission
- In office 2 April 2007 – 31 May 2009

Personal details
- Born: 1 June 1939 (age 86)

S. Rajendra Babu (born 1 June 1939) is a retired Indian judge, who served as the 34th Chief Justice of India. He also served as the chairperson of National Human Rights Commission of India.

== Biography ==
S. Rajendra Babu was born in Bangalore, on 1 June 1939. He pursued his LLB from Raja Lakhamagouda Law College, Belgaum Karnataka University.

== Professional career ==
Babu was appointed permanent judge of the Karnataka High Court in February 1988 and a judge of the Supreme Court of India on 25 September 1997. On 2 May 2004, as the senior-most Puisne judge of the Supreme Court, he succeeded Justice V. N. Khare as Chief Justice of India. His tenure lasted less than a month, as he retired on 1 June 2004, upon his 65th birthday.

During his tenure in the Supreme Court, Babu delivered several landmark judgments in civil law, criminal law, constitutional law, environmental law, taxation, corporate law and intellectual property matters. Babu analysed the mob psychology in the case relating to anti-Sikh riots, following the assassination of Indira Gandhi. He also interpreted the provisions of the Muslim Women (Protection of Rights on Divorce) Act, 1986. Over the course of his Supreme Court tenure, Babu authored 426 judgments.

Babu assumed the office of Chairperson of National Human Rights Commission on 2 April 2007 and held tenure until 31 May 2009. He is the fifth Chairperson of the Commission.

== Post judicial career ==
Babu presently hold (2014) the ICICI Chair (Professor) at the National Law School of India University. Deeply interested in Vedanta, Babu has been imparting training in community health work as the President of International Nursing Services Association for over 25 years.

== Honours ==
Babu was conferred with an honorary doctorate by his alma mater, Karnataka University, in 2005.

Preceded by V. N. Khare	Chief Justice of India; 2 May 2004– 1 June 2004	Succeeded by Ramesh Chandra Lahoti
