= Prakash Chandra Tatia =

Indian judge (born 1951)

Hon'ble Chief Justice (Retd.) Prakash Chandra Tatia

Chairman of Rajasthan State Human Rights Commission
- In office 11 March 2015 – 25 November 2019
- Appointed by: Kalyan Singh
- Preceded by: Nagendra Kumar Jain
- Succeeded by: G. K. Vyas

Chairman of Armed Forces Tribunal
- In office 23 August 2013 – March 2016
- Appointed by: Pranab Mukherjee
- Preceded by: Ashok Kumar Mathur
- Succeeded by: Virender Singh

8th Chief Justice of Jharkhand High Court
- In office 11 September 2011 – 3 August 2013
- Nominated by: S. H. Kapadia
- Appointed by: Pratibha Patil
- Preceded by: Bhagwati Prasad
- Succeeded by: R. Banumathi; D. N. Patel (acting)

Judge of Jharkhand High Court
- In office 11 April 2011 – 10 September 2011; Acting CJ : 13 May 2011 - 10 September 2011
- Nominated by: S. H. Kapadia
- Appointed by: Pratibha Patil

Judge of Rajasthan High Court
- In office 11 January 2001 – 10 April 2011
- Nominated by: Adarsh Sein Anand
- Appointed by: K. R. Narayanan

Personal details
- Born: 4 August 1951 (age 75) Jodhpur, Rajasthan
- Education: B.Sc and LL.B
- Alma mater: Jodhpur University, Jodhpur

Prakash Chandra Tatia (born 4 August 1951) is a retired Indian judge, who served as the 8th Chief Justice of the Jharkhand High Court and judge of the High Court of Rajasthan.

== Education ==
Tatia was born on 4 August 1951. He completed his B.Sc. and LL.B from Jodhpur University in 1972 and 1975 respectively. He enrolled as advocate in 1975 and practised for 26 years in Rajasthan High Court at Jodhpur.

== Career ==
Tatia was elevated to bench of the Rajasthan High Court on 11 January 2001. He served in Rajasthan High Court until he was transferred to Jharkhand High Court on 11 April 2011. In Jharkhand High Court he assumed charge as acting chief justice on 13 May 2011 due to retirement of the then chief justice Bhagwati Prasad and subsequently became permanent on 11 September 2011 and retired on 3 August 2013.

== Post retirement career ==
After retiring as chief justice of Jharkhand High Court, he was appointed as chairman of Armed Forces Tribunal on 23 August 2013. In March 2015 he was also appointed as the Chairman of the Rajasthan Human Rights Commission. His appointment gave head to human rights panel after almost five years since retirement of justice Nagendra Kumar Jain.

His tenure as human rights panel chief was marred with controversies as he advocated for banning live-in relationships in India, arguing that they are tantamount to "social terrorism" and that the status of women abandoned after live-in relationships is worse than that of divorced women. He supported "intense awareness campaigns" to inform women about the risks of live-in relationships.

He resigned from the position of Chairman of the Rajasthan Human Rights Commission on 25 November 2019, citing health and family reasons. After his term as chairman of human rights panel, he unsuccessfully challenged government in Rajasthan High Court to get dual pension as retired chief justice and as well as retired chairman of human rights commission.
