= National Forest Commission =

India non-ministerial government department responsible for forests

Agency overview
- Formed: 2003
- Type: Non-ministerial government department
- Jurisdiction: India
- Agency executive: Justice Bhupinder Nath Kirpal, Chairman
- Parent department: Ministry of Environment, Forest and Climate Change
- Child agencies: Indian Forest Service; Indian Board of Wildlife

The National Forest Commission is a non-ministerial government department responsible for the assessment of policy in India regarding publicly owned forests and laws relating to both public and private Forestry in India. The commission was set up in 2003 to review and assess India's policy and law and their effect on India's forests. It was given instructions to make recommendations on ways India could achieve sustainable forest and ecological security. The report made over 300 recommendations to the Indian Board of Wildlife.

== History ==
The National Forest Commission of India was recommended on 21 January 2002 during a meeting of the Indian Board of Wild Life. The objective was to look into the restructuring, reform and strengthening the institutions affiliated with the forests of India. The board was initially made up of seven forestry commissioners and was chaired by former Chief Justice of India, Bhupinder Nath Kirpal. The commission was formally established on the 7th February 2003 based on the need for efficient management of forests, wood for commercial and industrial purposes and for medicinal plants. The recommendations were aimed at positively affecting poverty, environmental protection, with gender equity in the better management of the forest resources.

== See also ==
- Joint Forest Management
