= Pradip Kumar Mohanty =

Judicial member of Lokpal (2019-2024)

Justice Pradip Kumar Mohanty

Chairperson of Lokpal of India
- Additional Charge
- In office 28 May 2022 – 26 February 2024
- Appointed by: Ram Nath Kovind
- Preceded by: Pinaki Chandra Ghose
- Succeeded by: A. M. Khanwilkar

Judicial Member of Lokpal
- In office 23 March 2019 – 10 June 2024
- Appointed by: Ram Nath Kovind
- Chairman: Pinaki Chandra Ghose

11th Chief Justice of Jharkhand High Court
- In office 24 March 2017 – 9 June 2017
- Nominated by: J. S. Khehar
- Appointed by: Pranab Mukherjee
- Preceded by: Virender Singh
- Succeeded by: Aniruddha Bose; D. N. Patel (acting)

Judge of Jharkhand High Court
- In office 11 April 2016 – 23 March 2017; Acting CJ : 7 October 2016–23 March 2017
- Nominated by: T. S. Thakur
- Appointed by: Pranab Mukherjee

Judge of Orissa High Court
- In office 7 March 2002 – 10 April 2016
- Nominated by: S. P. Bharucha
- Appointed by: K. R. Narayanan
- Acting Chief Justice
- In office 15 February 2016 – 25 February 2016
- Appointed by: Pranab Mukherjee
- Preceded by: D. H. Waghela
- Succeeded by: Vineet Saran
- In office 27 February 2015 – 3 June 2015
- Appointed by: Pranab Mukherjee
- Preceded by: Amitava Roy
- Succeeded by: D. H. Waghela
- In office 7 July 2014 – 5 August 2014
- Appointed by: Pranab Mukherjee
- Preceded by: A. K. Goel
- Succeeded by: Amitava Roy
- In office 19 September 2013 – 11 October 2013
- Appointed by: Pranab Mukherjee
- Preceded by: C. Nagappan
- Succeeded by: A. K. Goel
- In office 24 December 2012 – 26 February 2013
- Appointed by: Pranab Mukherjee
- Preceded by: V. G. Gowda
- Succeeded by: C. Nagappan

Personal details
- Born: 10 June 1955 (age 71) Cuttack, Odisha, India
- Spouse: Kalpana Mohanty
- Parent: Jugal Kishore Mohanty (father)
- Education: Ravenshaw College, Madhusudan Law College (LL.B)

Pradip Kumar Mohanty (born 10 June 1955) is a former Indian High Court judge who served as Chief Justice of the Jharkhand High Court and later as a Judicial Member of the Lokpal of India. He retired from the post on 23 March 2024.

== Early life and family ==
Mohanty was born on 10 June 1955 in Cuttack, Odisha in an aristocratic Karan family with reputed legal background. His father, Justice Jugal Kishore Mohanty, served as a judge of the Orissa High Court and later became Chief Justice of the Sikkim High Court. His maternal grandfather, Justice Rajkishore Das, was also a judge of the Orissa High Court.

He attended Ravenshaw Collegiate School in Cuttack, graduated from Ravenshaw College in 1974, and obtained his Bachelor of Laws (LL.B.) degree from Madhusudan Law College of Cuttack in 1978.

== Career ==
After completing his legal education, In 1978, Mohanty joined bar council and began practising law, primarily in constitutional, criminal and civil matters. He worked under prominent criminal lawyers Girija Shankar Bohidar and Basant Kumar Sahu. He also served as Additional Government Advocate in the Orissa High Court and as Special Public Prosecutor in the Graham Staines murder case. He was elected to the Orissa State Bar Council in 1986 and held important positions in the Orissa High Court Bar Association.

Mohanty was appointed an Additional Judge of the Orissa High Court on 7 March 2002 and became permanent on 6 March 2004. During his tenure, he also served five times as Acting Chief Justice of the Orissa High Court and as Executive Chairman of the Odisha State Legal Services Authority from 2012 to 2016. He was nominated as Chairman of NSA Advisory Board constituted under the National Security Act, 1980, and served as a Company Judge of the Orissa High Court. On 11 April 2016, he was transferred to the Jharkhand High Court, where he became Acting Chief Justice on 7 October 2016 and Chief Justice on 24 March 2017. He retired on 9 June 2017 upon attaining the age of superannuation.

== In Lokpal ==
After retirement, Mohanty continued to serve in public life. He was appointed Judicial Member of the Lokpal of India on 23 March 2019. Following the retirement of the first Lokpal Chairperson, Justice Pinaki Chandra Ghose, he assumed additional charge as Acting Chairperson of the Lokpal on 28 May 2022 following the retirement of Ghose. He continued in this role until Justice Ajay Manikrao Khanwilkar assumed office in February 2024, and Mohanty's tenure as Judicial Member concluded in June 2024.
