= Sujit Narayan Prasad =

Indian judge

Hon'ble Justice Sujit Narayan Prasad
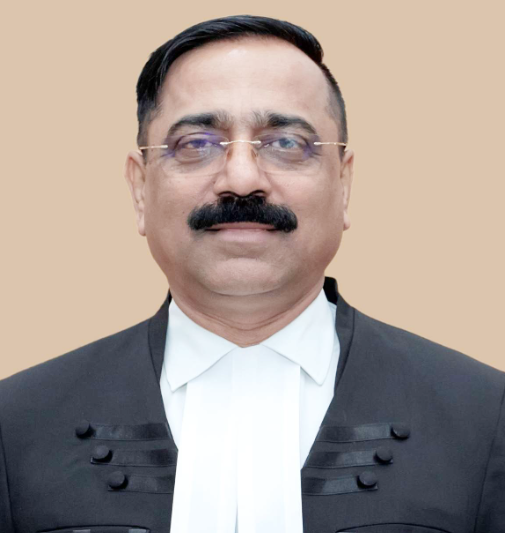

Judge of the Jharkhand High Court
- Incumbent
- Assumed office 22 November 2018

Acting Chief Justice of Jharkhand High Court
- In office 22 July 2025 – 23 July 2025

Acting Chief Justice of Jharkhand High Court
- In office 20 July 2024 – 24 September 2024

Judge of Orissa High Court
- In office 12 March 2015 – 22 November 2018

Additional Judge of Jharkhand High Court
- In office 26 September 2014 – 11 March 2015

Personal details
- Born: 20 June 1967 (age 59)

Justice Sujit Narayan Prasad (born 20 June 1967) is an Indian judge serving on the Jharkhand High Court. He has twice served as its Acting Chief Justice in 2024 and 2025. He previously served as a judge of the Orissa High Court.

== Judicial career ==
Prasad was elevated as an Additional Judge of the Jharkhand High Court and took oath on 26 September 2014. He was transferred to the Orissa High Court on 12 March 2015 and was repatriated to the Jharkhand High Court, where he took oath as a judge on 22 November 2018.

== Acting Chief Justice ==
Prasad served as Acting Chief Justice of the Jharkhand High Court from 20 July to 24 September 2024 and again from 22 July 2025 until Justice Tarlok Singh Chauhan took oath as Chief Justice on 23 July 2025.
