= M. S. Sonak =

18th Chief Justice of Jharkhand High Court

Hon'ble Chief Justice Mahesh Sharadchandra Sonak
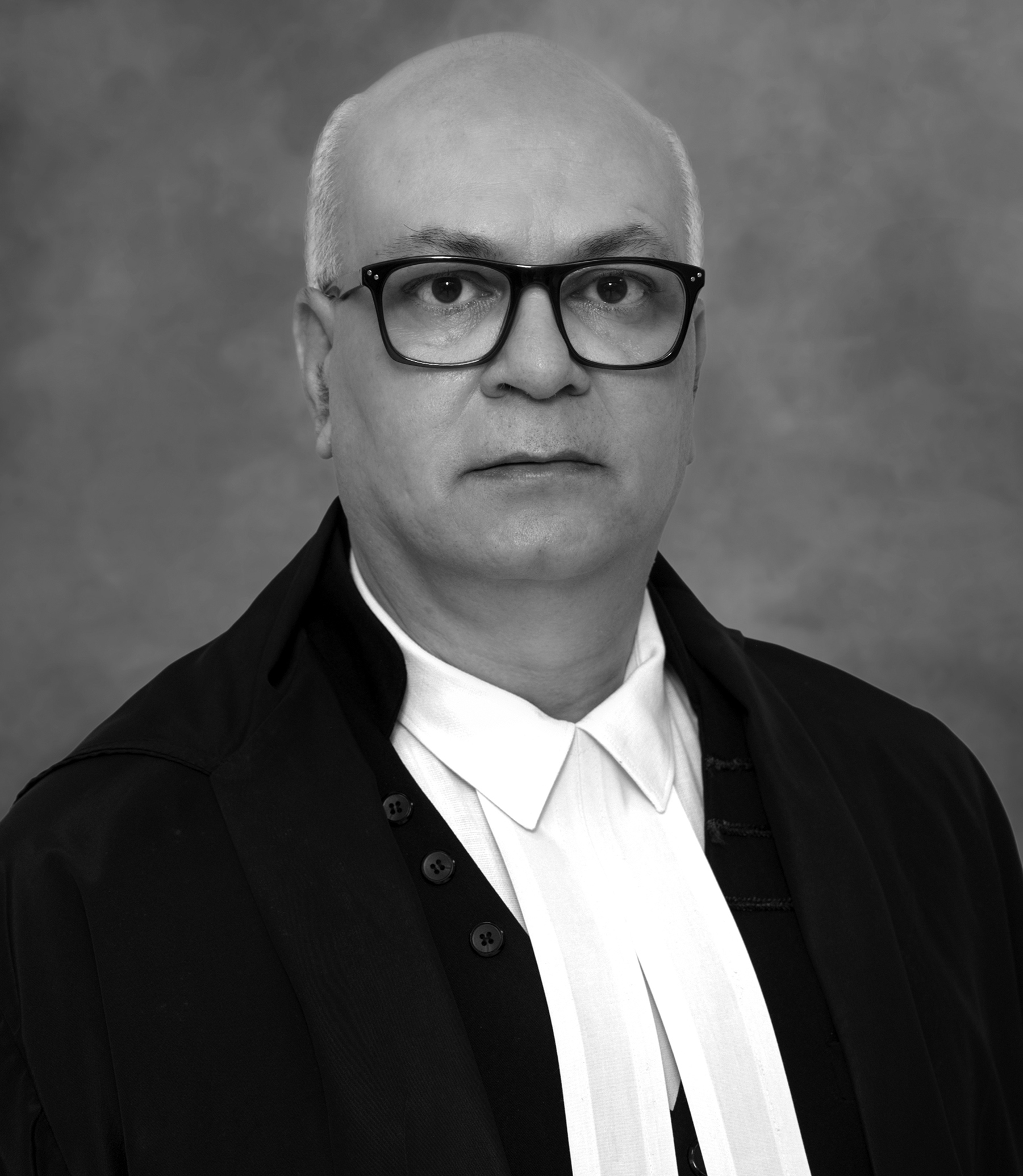

18th Chief Justice of Jharkhand High Court
- Incumbent
- Assumed office 9 January 2026
- Nominated by: Surya Kant
- Appointed by: Droupadi Murmu
- Preceded by: Tarlok Singh Chauhan

Judge of Bombay High Court
- In office 21 June 2013 – 8 January 2026
- Nominated by: Altamas Kabir
- Appointed by: Pranab Mukherjee

Personal details
- Born: 28 November 1964 (age 61)
- Education: B.Sc and LL.B
- Alma mater: M. S. College of Law, Panaji

Mahesh Sharadchandra Sonak (born 1964) is an Indian judge currently serving as the chief justice of Jharkhand High Court. He is former judge of the Bombay High Court, India.

== Life and career ==
Justice Sonak was born on 28 November 1964 and completed his education including Law in Panaji, Goa. He was enrolled as advocate with Bar Council of Maharashtra and Goa in October 1988 and practised at Panaji bench of Bombay High Court. He was elevated as an additional judge of the Bombay High Court on 21 June 2013 and was made permanent on 2 March 2016.

In May 2024, Justice Sonak created history by becoming the first person in Goa to register Living will.

On 18 December 2025, Supreme court collegium headed by CJI Surya Kant recommended him to be appointed as chief justice of Jharkhand High Court and central government cleared his elevation on 2 January 2026. He took oath as chief justice of Jharkhand High Court on 9 January 2026.
