= Prashant Kumar =

Former Acting Chief Justice of Jharkhand High Court

Hon'ble Acting Chief Justice Prashant Kumar

Acting Chief Justice of Jharkhand High Court
- In office 7 June 2019 – 30 August 2019
- Appointed by: Ram Nath Kovind
- Preceded by: Dhirubhai Naranbhai Patel (acting)
- Succeeded by: Harish Chandra Mishra (acting)

Judge of Jharkhand High Court
- In office 10 May 2019 – 6 June 2019
- Nominated by: Ranjan Gogoi
- Appointed by: Ram Nath Kovind

Judge of Allahabad High Court
- In office 19 May 2016 – 9 May 2019
- Nominated by: T. S. Thakur
- Appointed by: Pranab Mukherjee

Judge of Jharkhand High Court
- In office 21 January 2009 – 18 May 2016
- Nominated by: K. G. Balakrishnan
- Appointed by: Pratibha Patil

Personal details
- Born: 1 July 1958 Chapra, Bihar
- Died: 30 August 2019 (aged 61) Ranchi, Jharkhand

Justice Prashant Kumar (1 July 1958 – 30 August 2019) was an Indian judge. He was the former Acting Chief Justice of Jharkhand High Court. He was also former judge of Jharkhand High Court and Allahabad High Court.
