= Judge Advocate General's Department (India) =

- Country: India
- Role: Military law, military justice and dealing with courts martial
- Mottos: Nyaya Eva Dharm ('Justice alone is the Supreme Duty' at any cost and under all circumstances)

Commanders
- JAG: Judge Advocate General

The Judge Advocate General's (JAG) Department is the legal branch of the Indian Military. It deals with military related disciplinary cases and litigation and assists in providing legal assistance to the army in human rights matters and the rule of law among other things. The department consists of legally qualified Army officers who are educated in military law and provide legal help to the military in all aspects. The department supports the Judge Advocate General who is the legal and judicial chief of India and advises the Chief of the Army Staff of legal matters. The JAG's Department is also responsible for emerging fields of military law such as those related to cyber laws, space laws, terrorism and human rights violations. The service rendered in the JAG's Department are considered to be Judicial service as per the regulations for the Indian Army.

== History ==
The JAG's Department traces its history to the British Articles of War-1385 and the evolution of military law. The corps day of the JAG is the day the Bill of the Army Act was laid in Parliament, 21 December 1949. Women were only eligible for appointment as officers in JAG after January 1992. The JAG also provides for permanent commission for women officers. Colonel Leena Gaurav became the First lady officer of the JAG Br to pick up the rank of Colonel .

== Recruitment ==
=== Selection ===
Every year the Indian Army releases a notification for law graduates between the ages of 21 and 27 for Short Service Commission to the department of JAG. Requirements include an LL.B. degree and be eligible for registration with the Bar Council of India. There are only ten posts in total, seven for men and three for women. The Directorate General of Recruiting is part of the selection process.

=== Induction training ===
Selected candidates will go through 49 weeks of rigorous pre-commission training at Officers Training Academy (OTA), Chennai. On successful completion candidates will be awarded 'Post Graduate Diploma in Defence Management and Strategic Studies' by University of Madras.

=== Deployment ===
After grant of commission and basic training the law graduates are attached to infantry units at border locations and function like their fellow soldiers. This one and half year exposure is intended to inculcate the practical aspects of military law, and exposure to military routine important to understand the future impacts their military orders may have.

== Women in Army legal services ==
Major Priya Jhingan was in the first batch of lady officers at the Officers Training Academy, Chennai and was commissioned into the JAG's Department.

In November 2019, Lt Col Jyoti Sharma became the first woman officer from the JAG's Department to be assigned a foreign mission. She has been appointed as a legal military expert to the Government of Seychelles.

== See also ==
- Armed Forces Tribunal
