= Armed Forces Tribunal Act, 2007 =

Parliament of India
- Long title: An Act to provide for the adjudication or trial by Armed Forces Tribunal of disputes and complaints with respect to commission, appointments, enrolment and conditions of service in respect of persons subject to the Army Act, 1950, the Navy Act, 1957 and the Air Force Act, 1950 and also to provide for appeals arising out of orders, findings or sentences of court martial held under the said Acts and for matters connected therewith or incidental thereto.
- Citation: Act No. 55 of 2007
- Passed by: Rajya Sabha
- Passed: 3 December 2007
- Passed by: Lok Sabha
- Passed: 6 December 2007
- Assented to by: President Pratibha Patil
- Assented to: 25 December 2007
- Commenced: 15 June 2008

Legislative history

First chamber: Rajya Sabha
- Bill title: Armed Forces Tribunal Bill, 2005
- Bill citation: Bill No. CXXIX of 2005
- Introduced by: Defence Minister Pranab Mukherjee
- Introduced: 20 December 2005
- Standing Committee on Defence: 23 December 2005–23 May 2006
- Passed: 3 December 2007

Second chamber: Lok Sabha
- Passed: 6 December 2007

Amended by
- Finance Act, 2017 (Act 7 of 2017)

Related legislation
- The Armed Forces Tribunal (Procedure for Appointment of Vice-Chairperson and Other Members) Rules, 2008; The Armed Forces Tribunal (Procedure) Rules 2008; The Armed Forces Tribunal (Practice) Rules 2009
- Status: In force

The Armed Forces Tribunal Act, 2007 was passed by the Parliament and led to the formation of Armed Forces Tribunal in India, with its principal seat located at Delhi in addition to ten other benches across the country.
