= Gujarat State Human Rights Commission =

Autonomous state body in Gujarat, India

Gujarat State Human Rights Commission ગુજરાત રાજ્ય માનવ અધિકાર આયોગ गुजरात राज्य मानव अधिकार आयोग
- Common name: Human rights commission
- Motto: लोगों के लिए सेवा Service for people

Agency overview
- Formed: 12 September 2006 (20 years ago)
- Preceding agency: National Human Rights Commission of India

Jurisdictional structure
- Federal agency (Operations jurisdiction): India
- Operations jurisdiction: India
- Map of Gujarat State Human Rights Commission's jurisdiction
- Area: 196,024 km^{2} (75,685 sq mi)
- Population: 60,383,628 (2011)
- Legal jurisdiction: Gujarat state
- General nature: Federal law enforcement

Operational structure
- Headquarters: Gandhinagar, Gujarat
- Members: 2
- Agency executive: Dr. Justice (Retd.) Kaushal Jayendra Thaker, Chairperson

Website
- Official website

The Gujarat State Human Rights Commission is an autonomous state body with quasi-judicial powers, tasked with investigating any violation of human rights in the western state of Gujarat, India.

The Commission was formed on 12 September 2006, with Justice D.S. Sinha as its first chairperson. The current chairperson is Justice Kaushal Jayendra Thaker.

== Significant incidents ==
The commission has been involved in these incidents:

- Best Bakery case
- Godhra train burning
