= Gopal Ballav Pattanaik =

32nd Chief Justice of India

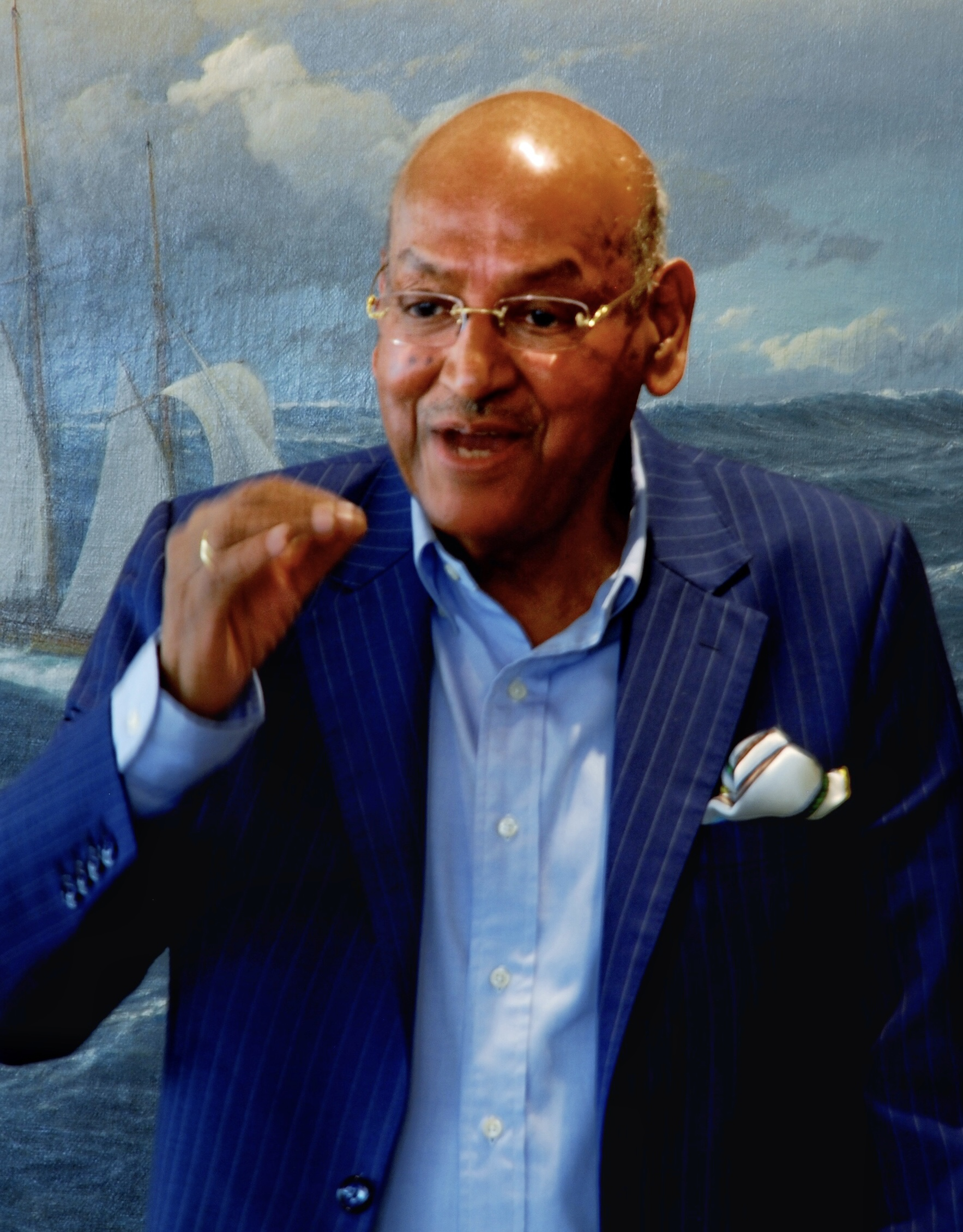
- Pattanaik giving a speech in 2018

32nd Chief Justice of India
- In office 8 November 2002 – 18 December 2002
- Appointed by: A. P. J. Abdul Kalam
- Preceded by: Bhupinder Nath Kirpal
- Succeeded by: Vishweshwar Nath Khare

Judge of Supreme Court of India
- In office 11 September 1995 – 7 November 2002
- Nominated by: Aziz Mushabber Ahmadi
- Appointed by: Shankar Dayal Sharma

27th Chief Justice of Patna High Court
- In office 19 May 1995 – 10 September 1995
- Nominated by: Aziz Mushabber Ahmadi
- Appointed by: Shankar Dayal Sharma
- Preceded by: Konduswami Venkataswamy
- Succeeded by: Devinder Pratap Wadhwa

Judge of Orissa High Court
- In office 1 June 1983 – 18 May 1995
- Nominated by: Yeshwant Vishnu Chandrachud
- Appointed by: Zail Singh

Personal details
- Born: 19 December 1937 (age 88) Cuttack, Odisha, India
- Citizenship: Indian
- Occupation: Jurist
- Awards: Utkal Ratna 2021

Gopal Ballav Pattanaik (born 19 December 1937) is an Indian lawyer and later a jurist who served for 19 years on the bench of the Odisha High Court as a permanent judge, as chief justice of Patna High Court, judge of the Supreme Court of India and as the 32nd Chief Justice of India.

Pattanaik grew up in Cuttack, Odisha, where he later studied at the Ravenshaw College and then graduated in science from Ewing Christian College, Allahabad University. He then went on to earn his degree in Law from Madhusudan Law College at Cuttack affiliated to the Utkal University in Odisha.

In 2002, Pattanaik was appointed Chief Justice of India by the President Shri A. P. J. Abdul Kalam.

Justice Patnaik was a member of the committee that formulated and recommended the Restatement of Values of Judicial Life, a code of judicial ethics for judges of the High Courts and the Supreme Court of India. The recommendations were adopted by the Supreme Court of India in a Full Court meeting on May 7, 1997. This charter was subsequently ratified and adopted by the Indian judiciary during the Chief Justices’ Conference in 1999. It serves as a guiding framework for the ethical conduct and integrity of the higher judiciary in India.

== Early life and education ==
He was born on 19 December 1937 in the city of Cuttack, now in Odisha, India.

He studied at the Ravenshaw College in Cuttack and graduated in Science from the Ewing Christian College, Allahabad University and earned his degree in Law from Madhusudan Law College, Utkal University in Odisha.

== Career ==
In 1962, he enrolled as an advocate in the Orissa High Court, where he practiced in civil, criminal, constitutional and corporate cases. He also appeared before the Supreme Court of India. As a first generation of lawyer, his legal career started in the chambers of late lawyer Bimal Pal, Barrister Birendra Mohan Patnaik and Justice Souri Prasad Mahapatra were instrumental in encouraging him to take up the legal profession.

In 1971, he was appointed the Standing Counsel for the state Government of Orissa. In 1974 he became an Additional Government Advocate and subsequently the Govt. Advocate of the state. In 1983, he was elevated to the bench of the Orissa High Court as a permanent judge. In 1995, he was appointed the Chief Justice of Patna High Court. After a short stint in the Patna High Court, he was elevated as a Judge of the Supreme Court of India. He went on to occupy the highest judicial post in the country as the 32nd Chief Justice of India on 8 November 2002.

When Patnaik took over as the Chief Justice of India, it appeared that he would not be able to achieve much in the administration of the judiciary, in view of his short tenure. However, he began a momentous chapter in the history of Indian judiciary by putting into practice the 'in-house procedure' evolved in 1997 to deal with allegations of misconduct against members of the higher judiciary.

Some of the far reaching and well published judgements of Patnaik include:-

- the Narmada Dam Project.
- Denying the central government of India the ability to grant permission to Hindu organisations to perform ceremonies at the disputed Babri masjid site in Ayodhya.
- Contempt of court case against Booker Prize winner Arundhati Roy.
- Acquittal of several persons belonging to the minority community in cases relating to the Bombay riots.
- The constitutional reference on the minority educational institutions.
- In a landmark judgement in the Daniel Latifi v. Union of India, 2001 (7) SCC 740, heading the Constitutional Bench of the Supreme Court in this case, Patnaik held that liability of Muslim husband to his divorced wife arising under Section 3(1) (a) of the Act to pay maintenance is not confined to iddat period. This judgement was a landmark one uplifting the rights of Muslim women in India to maintenance from their divorced husband.

Over the course of his Supreme Court, Patnaik authored 420 judgments and sat on 3,128 benches.

Pattanaik was a member of the Indo British and Indo-U.S. judicial exchange programme. He visited UK and the United States and participated in joint workshops and seminars with the judges of the House of Lords in Britain and the U.S. Supreme Court, respectively. His contemporaries in the US Supreme Court with whom he participated in the joint workshop were Chief Justice William Rehnquist and Justice Sandra Day O’Connor (the first woman judge of the US Supreme Court).

Pattnaik is a former Chairperson of the National Judicial Academy of India, Executive Chairman of the National Legal Services Authority of India (NALSA) and Former President of the Association of Retired Judges of Supreme Court and High Courts of India.

For several years he was the Chairman of the selection committee for the prestigious literary award of Indian literature, the “Saraswati Samman”.

== Awards and honours ==
He was conferred with an honorary doctorate in law LLD by the Utkal University. In 2021 Pattanaik was the recipient of the prestigious Utkal Ratna award for his lifetime achievement in the field of Law and Justice.

He has written two autobiographies, “The Gown and the Gavel: Life Journey of a Former Chief Justice of India” in English and “Mane Achi Jeteki” (What I Remember) in his mother tongue Odiya.

Excerpts from his autobiography The Gown and The Gavel: Life Journey of a Former Chief Justice of India https://www.fairobserver.com/politics/the-gown-and-the-gavel-life-journey-of-a-former-chief-justice-of-india/

Legal offices
Preceded by Bhupinder Nath Kirpal	Chief Justice of India; 8 Nov 2002 – 18 Dec 2002	Succeeded by V. N. Khare
