= Ramesh Chandra Lahoti =

35th Chief Justice of India (1940–2022)

Hon'ble Chief Justice of India (Retd.) Ramesh Chandra Lahoti
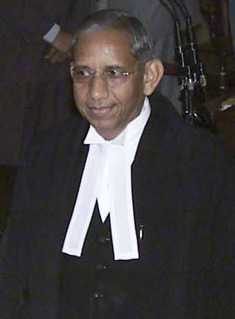
- Ramesh at his swearing ceremony

35th Chief Justice of India
- In office 1 June 2004 – 31 October 2005
- Appointed by: A. P. J. Abdul Kalam
- Preceded by: S. Rajendra Babu
- Succeeded by: Y. K. Sabharwal

Personal details
- Born: 1 November 1940 Guna, Madhya Pradesh, British Raj
- Died: 23 March 2022 (aged 81) New Delhi, India
- Spouse: Kaushalya Lahoti
- Relations: Krishna Kumar Lahoti (brother)

Ramesh Chandra Lahoti (1 November 1940 – 23 March 2022) was the 35th Chief Justice of India, serving from 1 June 2004 to 1 November 2005.

== Education and early career ==
He joined the Bar in Guna district in 1960 and enrolled as an advocate in 1962. In April 1977, he was recruited directly from the Bar to the State Higher Judicial Service and was appointed a District & Sessions Judge. After functioning as a District & Sessions Judge for a year, he resigned in May 1978 and reverted to the Bar for practice mainly in the High Court.

He was appointed the Additional Judge of the Madhya Pradesh High Court on 3 May 1988 and made permanent Judge on 4 August 1989. Lahoti was transferred to Delhi High Court on 7 February 1994. While serving as a Judge at Delhi High Court, Lahoti was appointed to investigate the 1996 Charkhi Dadri mid-air collision, and presented his findings the following year.

He was appointed a Judge of Supreme Court of India on 9 December 1998. He retired on his 65th birthday giving him a term of 17 months. His predecessor had a term of just 1 month. Over the course of his Supreme Court tenure, Lahoti authored 342 judgments.

His younger brother Krishna Kumar Lahoti was also a Judge in the Madhya Pradesh High Court and served as Acting Chief Justice there in 2013.

== Achievements ==
He served one of the longest terms as Chief Justice in recent years, retiring from office after 17 months.

In November 2004, Chief Justice Lahoti broke ranks with many of his predecessors who had expressed concern about growing corruption within the judiciary by proclaiming that the judiciary in India was 'clean'. This was an astounding statement, especially in the light of frequent exposés in the media about errant judges across the country.

Chief Justice's handling of judicial transfers has also attracted controversy. In February 2005, Chief Justice BK Roy was transferred from the Punjab and Haryana High Court to the Guwahati High Court, on Chief Justice Lahoti's watch.

Population control

Justice Lahoti upheld a Haryana law that did not allow those with more than two children to contest local body elections. He rejected arguments based on right to privacy and religion.

Migrants

He quashed the Illegal Migrants (Determination by Tribunals) Act on migrants to Assam.

== Post-retirement activities ==
He was on the Advisory Board of the Indian International Model United Nations. Justice Lahoti was also the Chairperson of the Advisory Board of the Faculty of Law at Manav Rachna University.

Legal offices
Preceded by S. Rajendra Babu	Chief Justice of India; 1 June 2004 – 1 November 2005	Succeeded by Yogesh Kumar Sabharwal
