= Armed Forces Tribunal =

Indian military tribunal, established 2007

Agency overview
- Formed: 8 August 2009
- Jurisdiction: Government of India
- Headquarters: New Delhi, India
- Minister responsible: Rajnath Singh, Minister of Defence
- Agency executive: Rajendra Menon, Chairperson
- Parent department: Ministry of Defence

The Armed Forces Tribunal is a military tribunal in India, established under the Armed Forces Tribunal Act, 2007.

In 1999, the Law Commission's 169th report stated that disciplinary and service matters required quick resolutions and proposed a special tribunal for the Indian army, navy and air force. The principal seat of the tribunal is located at Delhi in addition to ten other benches across the country.

== Former Chairpersons ==
List of Chairpersons of the Armed Forces Tribunal
Sr No	Chairperson	Term	
1	Ashok Kumar Mathur	1 September 2008	7 August 2013
2	Prakash Chandra Tatia	23 August 2013	March 2016
3	R C Mishra (Officiating Chairperson)	March 2016	3 June 2016
4	B P Katakey	3 June 2016	3 January 2017
5	Virender Singh	3 January 2017	6 October 2019
6	Rajendra Menon	6 November 2019	Incumbent

== See also ==
- Judge Advocate General (India)
- Judge Advocate General's Department (India)
