= Judge Advocate General (India) =

Office of the Indian Army

The post of Judge Advocate General in India, as a head of Judge Advocate General's Department, is held by a major general who is the legal and judicial chief of the Army. The Judge Advocate General is assisted by a separate JAG branch which consists of legally qualified army officers.

A Judge Advocate General of the Indian army advises the military personnel on their day to day matters including the Chief of the Army Staff. His department officers can either be commissioned directly into the JAG Branch or can be sidestepped from other branches, arms or corps. JAG officers provide legal help to the military in all aspects, in particular advising the presiding officers of courts-martial on military law. JAG officers conduct all legal procedures from framing drafts to appearing at courts and military tribunals.

== See also ==
- Armed Forces Tribunal
