= Ravi Ranjan =

Former Chief Justice of Jharkhand High Court

Hon'ble Chief Justice (Retd.) Ravi Ranjan
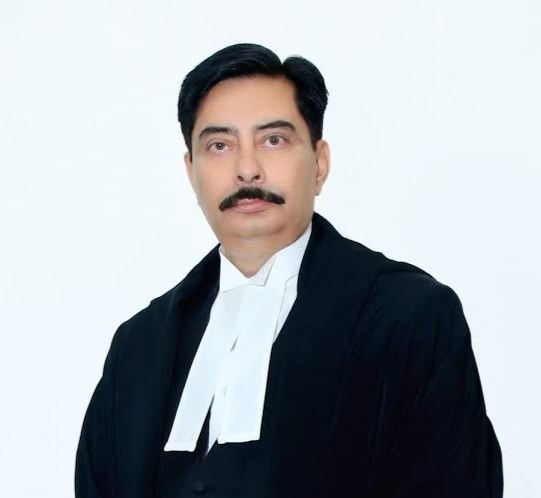

13th Chief Justice of Jharkhand High Court
- In office 17 November 2019 – 19 December 2022
- Nominated by: Ranjan Gogoi
- Appointed by: Ram Nath Kovind

Judge of Punjab and Haryana High Court
- In office 10 November 2018 – 16 November 2019
- Nominated by: Ranjan Gogoi
- Appointed by: Ram Nath Kovind

Judge of Patna High Court
- In office 14 July 2008 – 9 November 2018
- Nominated by: K. G. Balakrishnan
- Appointed by: Pratibha Patil

Personal details
- Born: 20 December 1960 (age 65) Patna, Bihar
- Education: Patna University

Justice Ravi Ranjan (born 20 December 1960) is a retired Indian judge and former Chief Justice of Jharkhand High Court. He also served as a judge of Punjab and Haryana High Court and Patna High Court.

== Career ==
Ravi Ranjan was born in 1960 at Patna. He passed M.Sc. in geology from Patna University, and LL.B. from Patna Law College in 1989. He was awarded Ph.D. in geology from Patna University. He joined Civil Engineering Department of the Bihar College of Engineering as a part-time Lecturer. After completion of LL.B., Ranjan joined Patna High Court for legal practice. He was appointed by Union of India as Senior Standing Counsel on 26 June 2004. On 14 July 2008 Ranjan was elevated as an Additional Judge of Patna High Court. He became the permanent Judge on 16 January 2010. He was appointed the Chief Justice of High Court of Jharkhand on 17 November 2019. He was retired on 19 December 2022.
