= Bhupinder Nath Kirpal =

31st Chief Justice of India

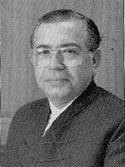

31st Chief Justice of India
- In office 6 May 2002 – 8 November 2002
- Appointed by: K. R. Narayanan
- Preceded by: Sam Piroj Bharucha
- Succeeded by: Gopal Ballav Pattanaik

Judge of Supreme Court of India
- In office 11 September 1995 – 5 May 2002
- Nominated by: A. M. Ahmadi
- Appointed by: Shankar Dayal Sharma

13th Chief Justice of Gujarat High Court
- In office 14 December 1993 – 10 September 1995
- Nominated by: M. N. Venkatachaliah
- Appointed by: Shankar Dayal Sharma
- Preceded by: Sundaram Nainar Sundaram
- Succeeded by: Gurudas Datta Kamat

Judge of Delhi High Court
- In office 20 November 1979 – 13 December 1993
- Nominated by: Y. V. Chandrachud
- Appointed by: Neelam Sanjeeva Reddy

Personal details
- Born: 8 November 1937 (age 88)
- Children: Saurabh Kirpal Senior Advocate Delhi High Court
- Education: St Stephen's College, Delhi; Delhi University

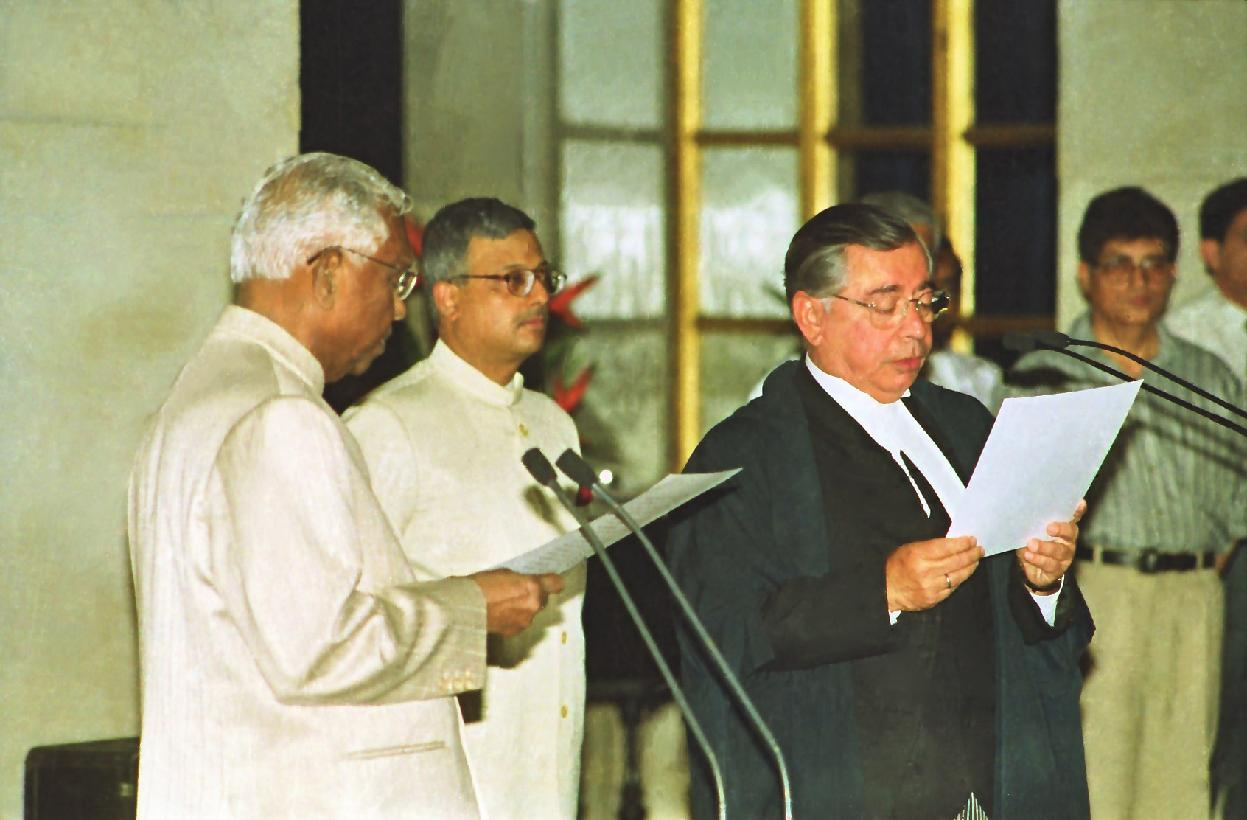
Bhupinder Nath Kirpal being sworn in as the Chief Justice of India

Bhupinder Nath Kirpal (B. N. Kirpal) (born 8 November 1937) is a retired Indian judge who was the 31st Chief Justice of India, serving from 6 May 2002 until his retirement on 7 November 2002.

== Early life and education ==
His father, Amar Nath Kirpal, was a lawyer. He is an alumnus of The Modern School, New Delhi and St Stephens College, Delhi University. A top cricketer, he represented both his school and college.

== Career ==
He began his legal career as an advocate in 1962 and was appointed a Judge of Delhi High Court in November 1979. In December 1993, he was appointed Chief Justice of the Gujarat High Court.

In September 1995, he was appointed Judge of the Supreme Court of India and became Chief Justice of India in May 2002.

Over the course of his Supreme Court tenure, Kirpal authored 195 judgments and sat on 916 benches.

By being Chief Justice of India, he also administered oath of office to 11th President of India A. P. J. Abdul Kalam.

After retirement as the Chief Justice of India, he was appointed the 1st Chairman of the National Forest Commission on 21 February 2003.

== Personal life ==
He was born in Lahore but shifted to Delhi after partition. He was married to late Aruna Kirpal (née Sachdev) and has three children. His son, Mr. Saurabh Kirpal, Senior Advocate of the Hon'ble Delhi High Court, was on 11 November 2021 approved by the collegium of the Hon'ble Supreme Court of India to be elevated as a Judge of the Delhi High Court.

Legal offices
Preceded by Sam Piroj Bharucha	Chief Justice of India; 6 May 2002 – 7 November 2002	Succeeded by Gopal Ballav Pattanaik
