= Harish Chandra Mishra =

Indian judge (1959–2026)

Hon'ble Harish Chandra Mishra
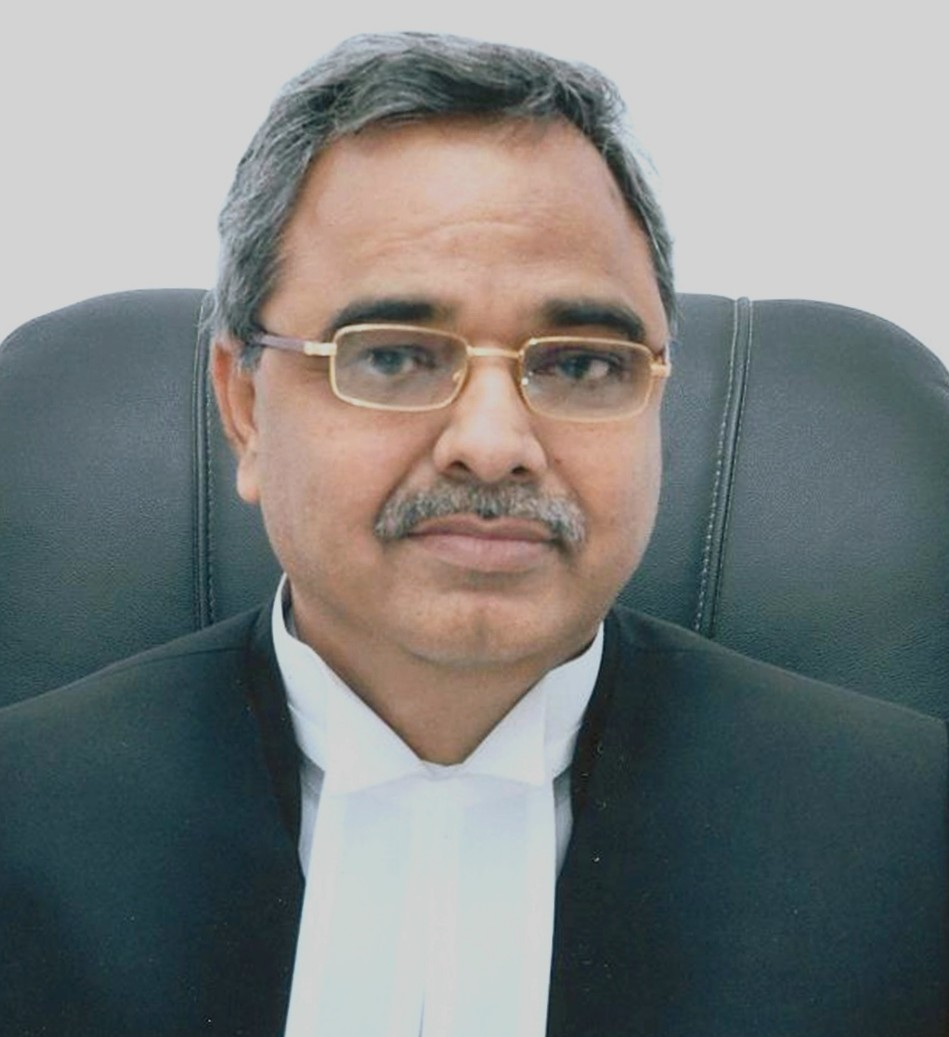

Lokayukta of Delhi
- In office 23 March 2022 – 3 September 2026
- Appointed by: Anil Baijal

Acting Chief Justice of Jharkhand High Court
- In office 30 August 2019 – 16 November 2019
- Appointed by: Ram Nath Kovind

Judge of Jharkhand High Court
- In office 27 April 2011 – 26 March 2021
- Nominated by: S. H. Kapadia
- Appointed by: Pratibha Patil

Personal details
- Born: 27 March 1959
- Died: 3 September 2026 (aged 67)
- Education: Patna Law College

Justice Harish Chandra Mishra (27 March 1959 – 3 September 2026) was an Indian judge who served as the Lokayukta of Delhi. He was also a judge of the Jharkhand High Court, and one of its acting Chief Justices. Mishra died on 3 September 2026, at the age of 67.
