= V. N. Khare =

33rd Chief Justice of India

Vishweshwar Nath Khare Hon'ble Chief Justice of India (Retd.)
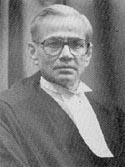

Chancellor of the Central University of Jharkhand
- In office August 2017 – December 2023
- Appointed by: Ram Nath Kovind

33rd Chief Justice of India
- In office 19 December 2002 – 01 May 2004
- Appointed by: A. P. J. Kalam
- Preceded by: Gopal Ballav Pattanaik
- Succeeded by: S. Rajendra Babu

Judge of Supreme Court of India
- In office 21 March 1997 – 18 December 2002
- Nominated by: A. M. Ahmadi
- Appointed by: Shankar Dayal Sharma

29th Chief Justice of Calcutta High Court
- In office 2 February 1996 – 20 March 1997
- Nominated by: A. M. Ahmadi
- Appointed by: Shankar Dayal Sharma
- Preceded by: Krishna Chandra Agarwal
- Succeeded by: Prabha Shankar Mishra

Judge of Allahabad High Court
- In office 25 June 1983 – 1 February 1996
- Nominated by: Y. V. Chandrachud
- Appointed by: Zail Singh

Personal details
- Born: 2 May 1939 (age 87) Allahabad, United Provinces, British India (Present day Prayagraj, Uttar Pradesh, India)
- Citizenship: India
- Children: 2
- Education: Allahabad University

Vishweshwar Nath Khare (born 2 May 1939) is a retired Indian judge who served as the 33rd Chief Justice of India, from 19 December 2002 to 1 May 2004. He also served as the Chancellor of the Central University of Jharkhand from 2017 to 2023. He was a judge of the Supreme Court of India from 21 March 1997 before he was elevated to the post of Chief Justice.

== Early life ==
Khare was born in Allahabad in a Kayastha family on 2 May 1939. He attended St. Joseph's College, Allahabad and later the Allahabad University. Khare was a First Class cricketer, playing for the state of Uttar Pradesh in Ranji Trophy matches in 1958.

== Legal career ==
Khare started his career as an advocate in the Allahabad High Court in 1961, where he practiced on civil, writ and revenue petitions. He was appointed Chief Standing Counsel for the Government of Uttar Pradesh. On 25 June 1983, he was appointed a Judge of the Allahabad High Court. In early 1996, he was appointed Chief Justice of the Calcutta High Court, from where he was elevated to the Supreme Court of India a year later. Over the course of his Supreme Court tenure, Khare authored 223 judgments.

=== Emergency ===
As an Advocate in 1975, Khare and his uncle, S. C. Khare, represented Indira Gandhi, Prime Minister of India, in her famous case against Raj Narain, alleging electoral malpractices. He was responsible for advocating the case that got the order of the High Court stayed until an appeal could be filed in the Supreme Court. The decision of the Supreme Court led to the imposition of Emergency in India for a period of 19 months, the only suspension of democracy the country has seen since Independence in 1947.

=== Gujarat violence ===
During his tenure as the Chief Justice of India, Khare was confronted with the failure of the justice system in the aftermath of the Gujarat violence following the Godhra train burning. His decision to reopen the Best Bakery case provided some recourse for victims of the violence. Speaking to The Hindu newspaper when he retired he said, "I found there was complete collusion between the accused and the prosecution in Gujarat, throwing rule of law to the winds. The Supreme Court had to step in to break the collusion to ensure protection to the victims and the witnesses. I was anguished and pained by the turn of events during the trial of the riot cases but was determined to salvage the criminal justice delivery system."

In interviews to the media in 2004, Khare explained why he decided to transfer the Best Bakery case to Maharashtra for a retrial. In a 2012 interview, Khare gave details about the Best Bakery case and the Gulbarg Society massacre in explaining why he believed the 2002 Gujarat Violence was an instance of a "state sponsored genocide".

== Post-retirement ==
Since retiring as Chief Justice of India, Khare comments occasionally on national television and press on issues of jurisprudence. His comments on the Jessica Lal murder case echoed the sentiments expressed during the Gujarat riots. He was also appointed the Chancellor of Central University of Jharkhand in 2017, serving until the end of 2023.

== Criticism ==
Khare's comments on there being an appearance of complicity between the state government and the rioters during the 2002 Gujarat violence have been criticized by the prime minister of India, Narendra Modi (Then Chief Minister of Gujarat). According to Modi:

Judges should keep away from politics. Khare should know the difference between khare and khote (right and wrong). The state government was never a party to riots, nor was it a silent spectator. No commission of inquiry has indicted me. I am a victim of false propaganda by a section of the media. The million-dollar question is why did Khare make the remark only after retiring from office? Regarding my role in the riots, the people of Gujarat are the best judge and they have replied in a befitting manner.

== Awards and honors ==
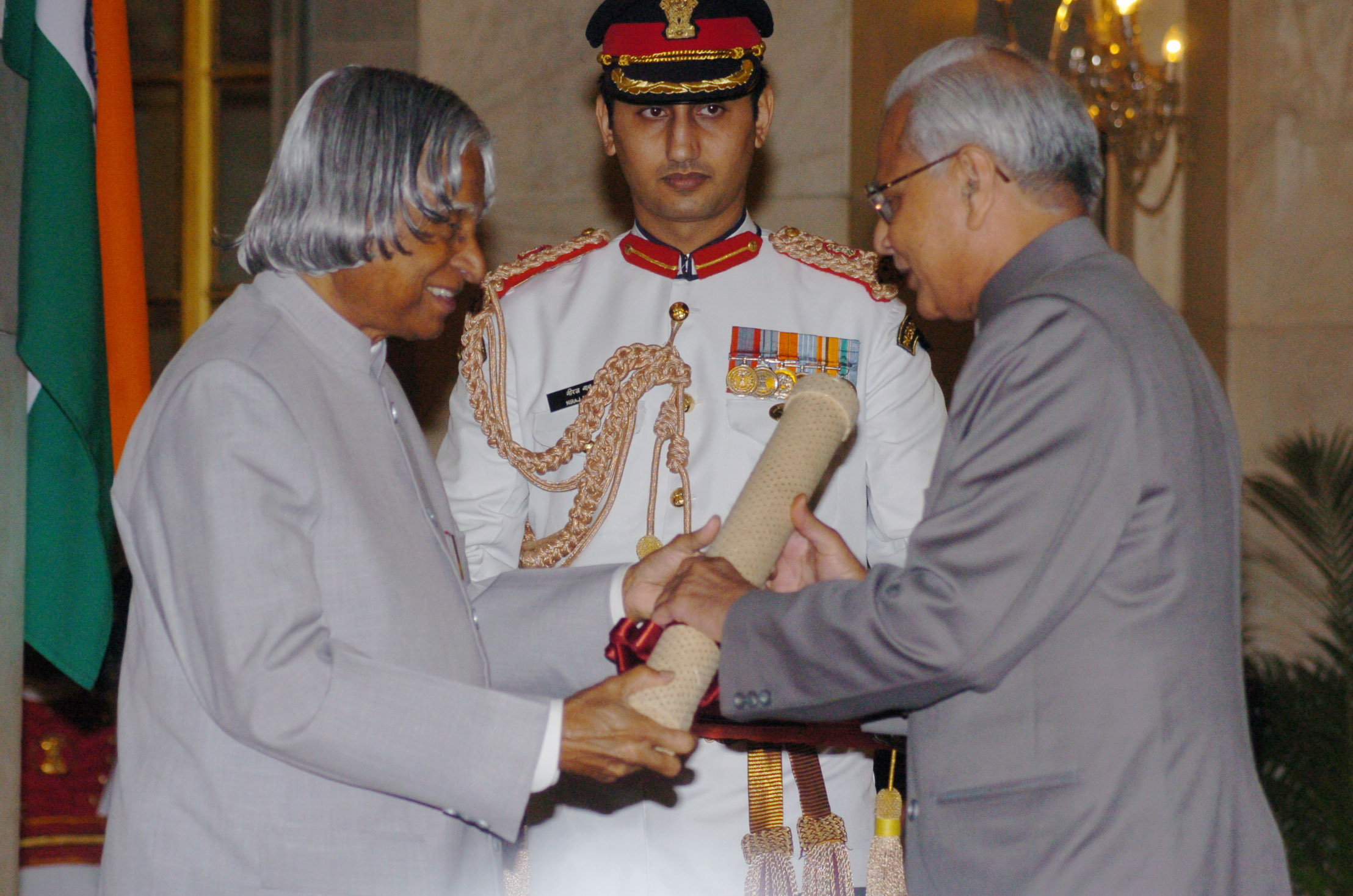
The President, Dr. A.P.J. Abdul Kalam presenting Padma Vibhushan to Justice Visheshwar Nath Khare at investiture ceremony, in New Delhi on March 29, 2006

Khare was awarded the Padma Vibhushan, India's second highest civilian honour in 2006.

Legal offices
Preceded by Gopal Ballav Pattanaik	Chief Justice of India; 19 December 2002– 2 May 2004	Succeeded by S. Rajendra Babu
