= Bar Council of Gujarat =

Statutory body overview
- Formed: 1961; 65 years ago
- Headquarters: Satyamev Complex, Ahmedabad
- Statutory body executives: ZALA ANIRUDHSINH, Chairman; PATEL RAMESHCHANDRA, Vice-Chairman; TRIVEDI KAMAL, Advocate General

Bar Council of Gujarat is the regulatory and statutorily representative body for lawyers practicing law in the state of Gujarat. It was constituted as per the mandatory requirement as per Advocates Act, 1961 and Bar Council of India. In March 1953, S. R. Das as head of the 'All India Bar Committee', proposed the creation of the apex body as an All-India Bar Council and Bar council at state levels and submitted a report to the Central Government of India. Members of the Bar Council are elected from among members enrolled and practicing as lawyers practicing law in the state of Gujarat and they represent the state in Bar Council of India meetings. Bar Council of a place designs standards of professional conduct to be followed by members, and designs etiquettes and has the power to enforce disciplinary guidelines over the members of bar council.

== History ==
The Gujarat Bar Council was formed as per the requirement of Section 3 of Advocates Act, 1961 which mandates for each state of India to have its Bar Council. As per the guidelines, the legal profession in India and the standards of legal education would be regulated by the All India Bar Council. The Law Commission of India was suggested to prepare a report on judicial administration reforms in India.

== Functions ==
Section 7 of the Advocates Act, 1961 lays down the regulatory and representative requirements which are mandatory for State Bar Councils. Bar Councils of each place has following functions:

1. As a statutory body regulating legal profession and education across state.
2. Facilitating the election with rules for members to get elected and manage the Bar Council.
3. Forwarding the names of elected members to Bar Council of India for formal approval as members.
4. Facilitating the formation of managing committee like chairman, Vice-chairman and Treasurer of the Bar.
5. Designing the professional behaviours and code to be followed by advocates who are its members.
6. Lay down guidelines for disciplinary committees and other committees formed by it.
7. Supporting with financial aid in case of need.
8. Protecting the advocate members rights, benefits and safeguarding their interests.
9. Designing, promoting and supporting law reform as per changing circumstances.
10. Handle and resolve other issues or any matter placed before it by its members in ad hoc situations.
11. Design and organize seminars on wide legal topics in the interest of members by reputed jurists and publishing them in journals and magazines of legal circles and other sources of media.
12. Facilitating legal aid to those who can't afford it.
13. Ensuring that guidelines laid in various legal forums are followed by members.
14. Initiating disciplinary action in case of professional misconduct.
15. Designing welfare schemes like Insurance for its members.
16. Supporting members with emergency services during natural calamities.
17. Initiate disciplinary action in case the official premises is used for other than professional purpose.
18. Fixing Annual Fee for members for enrolling in Council which includes fees for enrollment and funds towards identity card, building, library, indigent and other welfare schemes.
19. Organizing regular meeting with local associations enrolled with council.
20. Enrolling various bar associations in the state as its associate members.
21. Resolving disputes between members within timeframe.
22. Initiating disciplinary action against members for complying to its policies.
23. Enrolling newly qualified lawyers into council.

== Constitution ==
The council elects its own chairman and vice-chairman for a period of five years from amongst its members. Assisted by the various committees of the council, the chairman acts as the chief executive and director of the council. Voting rights in elections are available only for advocates having a Certificate of Practice. Till the year 2018, there were around 75,000 enrolled as members of the state Bar Council. As per the Advocates Act, the bar council of the state should have 25 members in case the members on roll exceeds 10000.

Mr.ANIRUDHSINH ZALA(Current) was elected as Chairman of Gujarat Bar Council in the year 2022.

== Enrollment of advocates ==
Graduates having a law degree from recognized universities permitted to impart legal education are admitted as advocates in The Gujarat Bar Council. Law graduates can enroll online for Gujarat Bar Council. State bar councils are empowered by Advocates Act, 1961 to frame rules according to their convenience for enrolling advocates in council. The enrollment committee formed by Councils will scrutinize a prospective member's application. Enrolled advocates of any bar council in-state are considered eligible to write the All India Bar Examination conducted by the Bar Council of India. After clearing the exam, they are certified by the Bar Council of India and issued 'a Certificate of Enrolment', which facilitates them to practice the profession of law in any High Court based in India and lower courts of the country, as an advocate. Advocates are required to qualify in the exam known as "Supreme Court Advocate on Record Examination" which is conducted by the Supreme Court exclusively to practice in the Supreme Court of Country.

== Important actions ==
1. In 2021, the Bar Council of Gujarat had given nearly Rs 2 Crores as financial support to 1510 lawyer members who had spent either as hospitalization charges or treatment at home for suffering from COVID-19.

2. In 2020, the Bar Council of Gujarat had given 12000 advocates a sum of Rs 6 crores as financial support as the Courts were in lockdown due to COVID-19.

== See also ==
- Bar Council of Andhra Pradesh
- Bar Council of Telangana
