= Bar Council of Delhi =

Representative body for lawyers in India

Statutory body overview
- Formed: 1961; 65 years ago
- Headquarters: Siri Fort Institutional Area, New Delhi
- Statutory body executive: Mr. Surya Prakash Khatri, Advocate., Chairman
- Website: https://delhibarcouncil.com/

Bar Council of Delhi is the regulatory and statutorily representative body for lawyers practising law in the Union Territory of Delhi. It was constituted as per the mandatory requirement as per Advocates Act, 1961 and Bar Council of India. In March 1953, the 'All India Bar Committee', headed by Pawan Sharma, submitted a report which proposed the creation of a bar council for each state and an all-India bar council as an apex body. Members of Bar Council are elected from among members enrolled and practicing as lawyers in Delhi and they represent the state in Bar Council of India meetings. Bar Council of a place designs standards of professional conduct to be followed by members, and designs etiquettes and has power to enforce disciplinary guidelines over the members of bar council.

== History ==
Bar Council of Delhi was formed as per the requirement of Section 3 of Advocates Act, 1961 which mandates for each state of India to have its Bar Council. Accordingly, in January 1961, the Delhi Bar Council was formed. As per the guidelines the legal profession in India and the standards of legal education would be regulated by All India Bar Council . The Law Commission of India was assigned the job of assembling a report on judicial administration reforms.

== Functions ==
Section 7 of the Advocates Act, 1961 lays down the Bar Council's regulatory and representative mandatory. Bar Councils of each place has following functions:

1. Facilitating the election with rules for members to get elected and manage the Bar Council.
2. Designing the professional behaviours and code to be followed by advocates who are its members.
3. Lay down guidelines for disciplinary committees and other committees formed by it.
4. Supporting with financial aid in case of need.
5. Protecting the advocate members rights, benefits and safeguarding their interests.
6. Designing, promoting and supporting law reform as per changing circumstances.
7. Handle and resolve other issues or any matter placed before it by its members in ad hoc situations.
8. Design and organise seminars on wide legal topics in the interest of members by reputed jurists and publishing them in journals and magazines of legal circles and other sources of media.
9. Facilitating legal aid to those who can't afford it.
10. Ensuring that guidelines laid in various legal forums are followed by members.
11. Initiating disciplinary action in case of professional misconduct.
12. Designing welfare schemes like Insurance for its members.
13. Supporting members and their families with emergency services during natural calamities.
14. Initiate disciplinary action in case the official premises is used for other than professional purpose.
15. Fixing Annual Fee for members for enrolling in Council which includes fees for enrollment and funds towards identity card, building, library, indigent and other welfare schemes.
16. Organising regular meeting with local associations enrolled with council.

== Constitution ==
The council elects its own chairman and vice-chairman for a period of two years from amongst its members. Assisted by the various committees of the council, the chairman acts as the chief executive and director of the council. Voting rights in elections are available only for advocates having Certificate of Practice. Till year 2018, there were around 60,000 enrolled advocates as members of the Delhi state Bar Council, making it largest Bar Council in the country. As per the Advocates Act, the bar council of the state should have 25 members in case the members on roll exceeds 10000.

== Enrollment of advocates ==
Graduates having a law degree from recognised universities permitted to impart legal education are admitted as advocates in Delhi Bar Council. Law graduates can enroll online for Delhi Bar Council. State bar councils are empowered by Advocates Act, 1961 to frame rules according to their convenience for enrolling advocates in council. Enrollment committee formed by Councils will scrutinise a prospective member's application. Enrolled advocates of any bar council in state are considered as eligible to write the All India Bar Examination conducted by Bar Council of India. After clearing the exam, he is certified by Bar Council of India and issued 'Certificate of Enrolment', which facilitates him to practice the profession of law in any High Court based in India and lower courts of the country, as an advocate. Advocates are required to qualify in the exam known as "Supreme Court Advocate on Record Examination" which is conducted by the Supreme Court exclusively to practice in the Supreme Court of Country.

== Important actions ==
1. In 2021, Bar council of Delhi gave financial aid and helped over 2000 to lawyers for fighting COVID-19. Council supported the lawyers with a financial aid of Rs 15000 for those with home quarantine and Rs 50,000 for those who didn't have medical insurance but were hospitalised. The total aid given by council was around Rs 3.59 crores with 2287 lawyers getting Rs 15000 and 33 lawyers getting Rs 50,000 to cover their hospitalisation charges.

2. The Bar Council also supported its members with 110 oxygen cylinders purchased by it through its trust and delivered at home and provided with refilling facilities.

3.In 2021, the Bar Council suspended some of its members who submitted fake Covid reports for financial assistance.

== See also ==
- Bar Council of India
- Bar Council of Telangana
- Bar Council of Andhra Pradesh
- K. K. Manan, a former chairman
