= Bar Council of Kerala =

Representative body for lawyers in India

Statutory body overview
- Formed: 1961; 65 years ago
- Headquarters: High Ct Rd, Kochi, Kerala
- Statutory body executive: K.N. Anil Kumar, Chairman
- Website: http://www.barcouncilkerala.org/

Bar Council of Kerala is the regulatory and statutorily representative body for lawyers practicing law in the Indian state of Kerala. It was constituted as per the mandatory requirement as per Advocates Act, 1961 and Bar Council of India. In March 1953, S. R. Das as head of the 'All India Bar Committee', proposed the creation of the apex body as an All-India Bar Council and Bar council at state levels and submitted a report to the Central Government of India. Members of the Bar Council are elected from among members enrolled and practicing as lawyers practicing law in the state of Kerala and they represent the state in Bar Council of India meetings. Bar Council of a place designs standards of professional conduct to be followed by members, and designs etiquettes and has the power to enforce disciplinary guidelines over the members of bar council.

== History ==
The Kerala Bar Council was formed as per the requirement of Section 3 of Advocates Act, 1961 which mandates for each state of India to have its Bar Council. As per the guidelines, the legal profession in India and the standards of legal education would be regulated by the All India Bar Council. The Law Commission of India was suggested to prepare a report on judicial administration reforms in India.

In July 2021, the state Bar Council along with Bar Councils of other Southern states of India had requested the Vice-president Mr Venkaiah Naidu and Supreme Court Chief Justice Hon. N. V. Ramana for the setting up of separate bench for Southern India.

== Functions ==
Section 7 of the Advocates Act, 1961 lays down the regulatory and representative requirements which are mandatory for State Bar Councils. Bar Councils of each place has following functions:

1. Facilitating the election with rules for members to get elected and manage the Bar Council.
2. Designing the professional behaviours and code to be followed by advocates who are its members.
3. Lay down guidelines for disciplinary committees and other committees formed by it.
4. Supporting with financial aid in case of need.
5. Designing, promoting and supporting law reform as per changing circumstances.
6. Handle and resolve other issues or any matter placed before it by its members in ad hoc situations.
7. Design and organise seminars on wide legal topics in the interest of members by reputed jurists and publishing them in journals and magazines of legal circles and other sources of media.
8. Facilitating legal aid to those who can't afford it.
9. Ensuring that guidelines laid in various legal forums are followed by members.
10. Initiating disciplinary action in case of professional misconduct.
11. Designing welfare schemes like Insurance for its members.
12. Supporting members with emergency services during natural calamities.
13. Initiate disciplinary action in case the official premises is used for other than professional purpose.
14. Fixing Annual Fee for members for enrolling in Council which includes fees for enrollment and funds towards identity card, building, library, indigent and other welfare schemes.
15. Organising regular meeting with local associations enrolled with council.
16. Enrolling various bar associations in the state as its associate members.
17. Resolving disputes between members within timeframe.
18. Initiating disciplinary action against members for complying to its policies.
19. Enrolling newly qualified lawyers into council.

== Constitution ==
The council elects its own chairman and vice-chairman for a period of two years from amongst its members. Assisted by the various committees of the council, the chairman acts as the chief executive and director of the council. Voting rights in elections are available only for advocates having a Certificate of Practice. As per the Advocates Act, the bar council of the state should have 25 members in case the members on roll exceeds 10000.

Mr. Ajay Kochar was elected as Chairman of Kerala Bar Council in the year 2021.

== Enrollment of advocates ==
Graduates having a law degree from recognised universities permitted to impart legal education are admitted as advocates in The Kerala Bar Council. Law graduates can enroll online for Kerala Bar Council. State bar councils are empowered by Advocates Act, 1961 to frame rules according to their convenience for enrolling advocates in council. The enrollment committee formed by Councils will scrutinise a prospective member's application. Enrolled advocates of any bar council in state are considered as eligible to write the All India Bar Examination conducted by the Bar Council of India. After clearing the exam, they are certified by the Bar Council of India and issued 'Certificate of Enrolment', which facilitates them to practice the profession of law in any High Court based in India and lower courts of the country, as an advocate. Advocates are required to qualify in the exam known as "Supreme Court Advocate on Record Examination" which is conducted by the Supreme Court exclusively to practice in the Supreme Court of Country.

== Past Chairmen ==
Below are the past Chairmen of the Kerala Bar Council:

Index	Name	Holding charge from	Holding charge to
1	K.K Mathew	02.12.1961	02.06.1962
2	V.P. Gopalan Nambiar	01.01.1963	27.03.1965
3	T.S. Krishna Moorthy	28.03.1965	29.10.1965
4	Dr. V.A. Sail Mohammad	30.10.1965	08.09.1967
5	P.Subramanian Potti	09.09.1967	18.07.1969
6	M.M. Abdul Khader	19.07.1969	08.06.1979
7	C.K. Sivasankara Panicker	09.06.1979	20.02.1980
8	K. Sudhakaran	21.02.1980	07.01.1982
9	V. Bhaskaran Nambiar	08.01.1982	09.09.1983
10	M.K. Vasudeva Kurup	10.09.1983	31.05.1986
11	M.M. Abdul Aziz	01.06.1986	30.03.1990
12	K.M.C. Kurup	31.03.1990	01.03.1992
13	M.M. Abdul Aziz	01.03.1992	18.09.1993
14	M.K. Vasudeva Kurup	19.09.1993	17.02.1996
15	K.M.C. Kurup	18.02.1996	15.06.1997
16	Thomas Mathew	15.06.1997	28.02.1999
17	S. Gopakumaran Nair	28.02.1999	03.04.1999
18	M.K. Damodaran	03.04.1999	04.06.2000
19	S. Gopakumaran Nair	04.06.2000	12.04.2003
20	Vinod Singh Cherian (Acting)	12.04.2003	29.06.2003
21	K.B. Mohandas	29.06.2003	26.11.2005
22	P.G. Thampi	27.11.2005	19.10.2008
23	Vinod Singh Cherian	19.10.2008	29.08.2010
24	K. Jayarajan	29.08.2010	10.05.2011
25	Sreedharan Nair C	11.05.2011	13.04.2014
26	T.H Abdul Azeez	13.04.2014	15.02.2015
27	Joseph John	15.02.2015	28.08.2016
28	E Shanavas Khan from 28 to 08–2016 to 10–10–2016	28.08.2016	10.10.2016
29	C.P Sudharakara Prasad	11.10.2016	

== Important Actions ==
1. In 2020, Bar Council of Kerala for the first time organised on-line enrollment procedure for newly passed out lawyers in which around 810 members participated through video conferencing which was web-based.

== See also ==
- Bar Council of Andhra Pradesh
- Bar Council of Telangana
