= Bar Council of Punjab and Haryana =

Legal organisation in India

Statutory body (established under Indian law) overview
- Formed: 1961; 65 years ago
- Headquarters: Law Bhawan, Dakshin Marg, Sector 37A, Chandigarh 160036
- Statutory body (established under Indian law) executive: Ashok Singla, Chairman; Partap Singh, Member Bar Council of India; Gurtej Singh Grewal, Honorary Secretary
- Parent department: Bar Council of India
- Website: bcph.co.in

Bar Council of Punjab and Haryana is the state regulatory and statutory representative body for lawyers practicing law in the three states of Punjab and Haryana and Union Territory of Chandigarh. It was constituted as per the mandatory requirement of Advocates Act, 1961 and Bar Council of India. In March 1953, the 'All India Bar Committee', headed by S. R. Das, submitted a report which proposed the creation of a Bar Council for each state and an All-India Bar Council as an apex body. Members of the Bar Council are elected from amongst members enrolled and practicing as lawyers in Punjab, Haryana and Chandigarh, and they represent the state in Bar Council of India meetings. Bar Council enforces standards of professional conduct to be followed by member advocates, and designs etiquettes and has the power to enforce disciplinary guidelines over the members of Bar.

== History ==
Bar Council of Punjab and Haryana was formed as per the requirement of Section 3 of Advocates Act, 1961 which mandates for each state of India to have its Bar Council. Accordingly, Bar Council of Punjab and Haryana was formed. As per the guidelines the legal profession in India and the standards of legal education would be regulated by All India Bar Council. The Law Commission of India was assigned the job of assembling a report on judicial administration reforms.

== Functions ==
Section 7 of the Advocates Act, 1961 lays down the Bar Council's regulatory and representative mandatory. Bar Councils of each place has following functions:

1. Facilitating the election with rules for members to get elected and manage the Bar Council.
2. Designing the professional behaviours and code to be followed by advocates who are its members.
3. Lay down guidelines for disciplinary committees and other committees formed by it.
4. Supporting with financial aid in case of need.
5. Protecting the advocate members rights, benefits and safeguarding their interests.
6. Designing, promoting and supporting law reform as per changing circumstances.
7. Handle and resolve other issues or any matter placed before it by its members in ad hoc situations.
8. Designing and promoting legal education in country and states.
9. Design and organise seminars on wide legal topics in the interest of members by reputed jurists and publishing them in journals and magazines of legal circles and other sources of media.
10. Facilitating legal aid to those who can't afford it.
11. Ensuring that guidelines laid in various legal forums are followed by members.
12. Initiating disciplinary action in case of professional misconduct
13. Designing welfare schemes like Insurance for its members
14. Supporting members with emergency services during natural calamities.
15. Initiate disciplinary action in case the official premises is used for other than professional purpose.
16. Fixing Annual Fee for members for enrolling in Council which includes fees for enrollment and funds towards identity card, building, library, indigent and other welfare schemes.
17. Organising regular meeting with local associations enrolled with council.
18. Enrolling various bar associations in the state as its associate members.
19. Resolving disputes between members within timeframe.
20. Initiating disciplinary action against members for complying to its policies.
21. Enrolling newly qualified lawyers into council.
22. Occasionally verifying the renewal of the enrolled members.
23. Ensuring polls are conducted to Bars associated with it.

== Constitution ==
The State Council elects its own Chairman and Vice-Chairman i.e. the two statutory posts for a period of two years from amongst its members along with one Member Representative to the Bar Council of India for five years. Assisted by the various committees of the Council, the Chairman acts as the chief executive and director of the Council. Voting rights in general elections (for electing 25 Members to the Council) are available only for advocates having a Certificate of Practice. Till the year 2021, there were around 1,00,000 enrolled as members of the state Bar Council, and now in 2023 the number has grown by ten thousand newly enrolled lawyers each year. As per the Advocates Act, the Bar Council of the state should have 25 members in case the members on roll exceeds 10000 and accordingly Bar Council of Punjab and Haryana has 25 members and two ex-office being the Advocate General's of the two states i.e. Punjab and Haryana.

Suvir Sidhu was elected as youngest Chairman of Bar Council of Punjab and Haryana in 2022. Earlier he got elected as the youngest Member at the age of 27. Currently Dr. Vijender Ahlawat is the Chairman of Bar Council of Punjab & Haryana

== Enrollment of advocates ==
Graduates having a law degree from recognised universities permitted to impart legal education are admitted as advocates in Bar Council of Punjab and Haryana. Law graduates can enroll online for Bar Council of Punjab and Haryana. State bar councils are empowered by Advocates Act, 1961 to frame rules according to their convenience for enrolling advocates in council. The enrollment committee formed by Councils will scrutinise a prospective member's application. Enrolled advocates of any bar council in state are considered as eligible to write the All India Bar Examination conducted by the Bar Council of India. After clearing the exam, he is certified by the Bar Council of India and issued the 'Certificate of Enrolment', which facilitates him to practice the profession of law in any High Court based in India and lower courts of the country, as an advocate. Advocates are required to qualify in the exam known as "Supreme Court Advocate on Record Examination" which is conducted by the Supreme Court exclusively to practice in the Supreme Court of Country.

== Important actions ==
1. In April 2021, Bar Council of Punjab and Haryana removed former IPS officer Kunwar Vijay Pratap Singh after he requested for the same and also from the facility of Co-option and member of its disciplinary committee after some members complained against the position held by him.
2. In August 2021, Bar Council of Punjab and Haryana through its election tribunal had invalidated executive body elections of Chandigarh District Bar Association.

== See also ==
- Bar Council of India
