= Bar Council of Karnataka =

Legal organisation

- ಕರ್ನಾಟಕ ಬಾರ್ ಕೌನ್ಸಿಲ್

Statutory body overview
- Formed: 30 June 2018 (8 years ago)
- Headquarters: Old Election Commission Building, Bengaluru
- Statutory body executives: Srinivasas Babu L., Chairman; Kiwad Kalmeshwar Tukaram, Vice Chairman
- Website: http://ksbc.org.in/index.php

Bar Council of Karnataka is the regulatory and statutory representative body for lawyers practicing law in the state of Karnataka. It was constituted as per the mandatory requirement as per Advocates Act, 1961 and Bar Council of India. In March 1953, the 'All India Bar Committee', headed by S. R. Das, submitted a report which proposed the creation of a bar council for each state and an all-India bar council as an apex body. Members of the Bar Council are elected from among members enrolled and practicing as lawyers in Karnataka and they represent the state in Bar Council of India meetings. Bar Council of a place designs standards of professional conduct to be followed by members, and designs etiquettes and has the power to enforce disciplinary guidelines over the members of bar council.

== History ==
Bar Council of Karnataka was formed as per the requirement of Section 3 of Advocates Act, 1961 which mandates each state of India to have a Bar Council. On 30 June 2018, the Karnataka Bar Council was formed. As per the guidelines the legal profession in India and the standards of legal education would be regulated by All India Bar Council. The Law Commission of India was assigned the job of assembling a report on judicial administration reforms.

In July 2021, the state Bar Council along with Bar Councils of other Southern states of India had requested the Vice-President Mr Venkaiah Naidu and Supreme Court Chief Justice Hon. N. V. Ramana for the setting up of separate bench for Southern India.

== Functions ==
Section 7 of the Advocates Act, 1961 lays down the Bar Council's regulatory and representative mandatory. Bar Councils of each place has following functions:

1. Facilitating the election with rules for members to get elected and manage the Bar Council.
2. Designing the professional behaviours and code to be followed by advocates who are its members.
3. Lay down guidelines for disciplinary committees and other committees formed by it.
4. Supporting with financial aid in case of need.
5. Protecting the advocate members rights, benefits and safeguarding their interests.
6. Designing, promoting and supporting law reform as per changing circumstances.
7. Handle and resolve other issues or any matter placed before it by its members in adhoc situations.
8. Designing and promoting legal education in country and states.
9. Design and organise seminars on wide legal topics in the interest of members by reputed jurists and publishing them in journals and magazines of legal circles and other sources of media.
10. Facilitating legal aid to those who can't afford it.
11. Ensuring that guidelines laid in various legal forums are followed by members.
12. Initiating disciplinary action in case of professional misconduct
13. Designing welfare schemes like Insurance for its members
14. Supporting members with emergency services during natural calamities.
15. Initiate disciplinary action in case the official premises is used for other than professional purpose.
16. Fixing Annual Fee for members for enrolling in Council which includes fees for enrollment and funds towards identity card, building, library, indigent and other welfare schemes.
17. Organising regular meeting with local associations enrolled with council.

== Constitution ==
The council elects its own Chairman and Vice-Chairman for a period of two years from amongst its members. Assisted by the various committees of the Council, the chairman acts as the chief executive and director of the Council. Voting rights in elections are available only for advocates having a Certificate of Practice. Till the year 2018, there were around 1,10,000 enrolled advocates as members of the Karnataka State Bar Council. As per the Advocates Act, the bar council of the state should have 25 members in case the members on roll exceeds 10000 and accordingly Karnataka State Bar Council has 27 members.

== Enrollment of advocates ==
Graduates having a law degree from recognised universities permitted to impart legal education are admitted as advocates in Karnatka Bar Council. Law graduates can enroll online for Karnataka Bar Council. State bar councils are empowered by Advocates Act, 1961 to frame rules according to their convenience for enrolling advocates in council. The enrollment committee formed by Councils will scrutinise a prospective member's application. Enrolled advocates of any bar council in state are considered as eligible to write the All India Bar Examination conducted by the Bar Council of India. After clearing the exam, he is certified by the Bar Council of India and issued the 'Certificate of Enrolment', which facilitates him to practice the profession of law in any High Court based in India and lower courts of the country, as an advocate. Advocates are required to qualify in the exam known as "Supreme Court Advocate on Record Examination" which is conducted by the Supreme Court exclusively to practice in the Supreme Court of Country.

== Notable actions ==
In 2021, Karnataka State Bar Council supported its 733 members who suffered from Covid with financial assistance to the extent of 1.06 crores. The council gave Rs 25000 to advocate members who were hospitalised in addition to Rs 10,000 for those who underwent home quarantine.

In 2021, Karnataka State Bar Council also requested Rs 25 crores financial grant to its members due to courts lockdown and their limited function due to Covid and made the representation to Karnataka Chief Minister.

Karnataka Bar Council in 2021 suspended a lawyer representing a victim who was a party in a case involving sleaze CD.

== See also ==
- Bar Council of India
