= Bar Council of India =

Regulating body of lawyers in India

Statutory body overview
- Formed: 1961; 65 years ago
- Headquarters: New Delhi, India
- Statutory body executives: Manan Kumar Mishra, Chairman; S. Prabakaran, Vice Chairman; Satish Abarao Deshmukh, Co-chairman
- Website: barcouncilofindia.org

Bar Council of India (BCI) is a statutory body established under section 4 of the Advocates Act 1961 that regulates the legal practice and legal education in India. Its members are elected from amongst the lawyers in India and represent the Indian bar. It prescribes standards of professional conduct, etiquettes and exercises disciplinary jurisdiction over the bar. It also sets standards for legal education and grants recognition to universities whose law degrees will qualify students to enrol themselves as advocates upon graduation.

== History ==
In March 1953, the 'All India Bar Committee', headed by S. R. Das, submitted a report that proposed the creation of a bar council for each state and an all-India bar council as an apex body. It was suggested that the All India Bar Council would regulate the legal profession and set the standard of legal education. The Law Commission of India was assigned the job of assembling a report on judicial administration reforms and helping India to reform justice and equity to the whole country.

In 1961, the Advocates Act was introduced to implement the recommendations made by the 'All India Bar Committee' and 'Law Commission'. M. C. Setalvad and C. K. Daphtary were the first chairman and vice chairman respectively. In 1963, C. K. Daphtary became the chairman and S. K. Ghose became the vice chairman.

== Functions ==
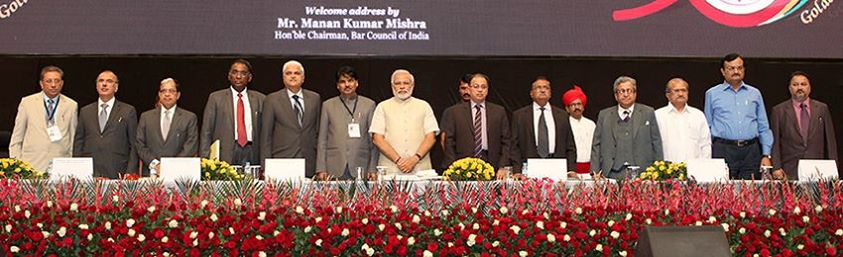
Golden Jubilee celebrations of the Bar Council of India

Section 7 of the Advocates Act, 1961 lays down the Bar Council's regulatory and representative mandate. The functions of the Bar Council are to:

1. Lay down standards of professional conduct and etiquette for advocates.
2. Lay down the procedure to be followed by disciplinary committees
3. Safeguard the rights, privileges and interests of advocates
4. Promote and support law reform
5. Deal with and dispose of any matter which may be referred by a State Bar Council
6. Promote legal education and lay down standards of legal education.
7. Determine universities whose degree in law shall be a qualification for enrollment as an advocate.
8. Conduct seminars on legal topics by eminent jurists and publish journals and papers of legal interest.
9. Organise and provide legal aid to the poor.
10. Recognise foreign qualifications in law obtained outside India for admission as an advocate.
11. Manage and invest funds of the Bar Council.
12. Provide for the election of its members who shall run the Bar Councils.

== Constitution ==
As per the Advocates Act, the Bar Council of India consists of members elected from each state bar council, and the Attorney General of India and the Solicitor General of India who are ex officio members.

The council elects its chairman and vice-chairman for two years from amongst its members. Assisted by the various committees of the council, the chairman acts as the chief executive and director of the council.

=== Present members ===
Bar Council of India
Name of the Member	Position
Manan Kumar Mishra	Chairman, Bar Council of India
Apurba Kumar Sharma	Executive Committee
S.Prabakaran Senior Advocate	Vice-chairman, Bar Council of India
D.K. Sharma, Senior Advocate	Co Chairman
Suresh Chandra Shrimali	Co Chairman
Shubhrawpratap Dasgupta, Senior Advocate	Additional Standing Council (CEIB), Member
R. Venkatramani	Attorney General of India, ex-officio member
Tushar Mehta	Solicitor General of India, ex-officio member
Shailendra Dubey	Member
Sadhashiva Reddy	Co Chairman
Ved Prakash Sharma	Co Chairman
Apurva Kumar Sharma	Chairman, Executive Committee
N. Manoj Kumar	Member, vice chairman, Executive Committee
Ramireddy,	Member
Prashant Kumar	Member
Dilip Patel	Member
Dr Amit vaid	Member
Suvir Sidhu	Member
Vishnuvardhan Reddy	Member
Srinath Tripathi	Member
Bhakta Bhushan, Jitendra Sharma, Ashish Deshmukh	Members
Ashok Dev	Member

Manan Kumar Mishra is the present chairman. He was preceded by Biri Singh Sinsinewar, who was in turn preceded by the current chairman, Manan Kumar Mishra.

== Enrollment of advocates ==
Eligible persons having a recognised law degree are admitted as advocates on the rolls of the state bar Councils. The Advocates Act, 1961 empowers state bar councils to frame their own rules regarding the enrollment of advocates. The council's enrollment committee may scrutinise a candidate's application. Those admitted as advocates by any state bar council are eligible to take the All India Bar Examination which is conducted by the Bar Council of India. Passing the All India Bar Examination awards the state-enrolled advocate with a 'Certificate of Enrolment' which enables the state-enrolled advocate to practice law as an advocate in any High Court and lower court within the territory of India. However, to practise Law before the Supreme Court of India, Advocates must first appear for and qualify in the Supreme Court Advocate on Record Examination conducted by the Supreme Court.

== Committees ==
The Bar Council of India has various committees which make recommendations to the council. The members of these committees are elected from amongst the members of the council.

- Executive Committee: This committee deals with the issues related to the management of funds, affairs of the staff, accounts, allotment of work, management of council's affairs, audit, library and legal publications delegation of work. Apurva Kumar Sharma from Assam is the chairman and N. Manoj Kumar from Kerala is the vice chairman of the executive committee at present.
- Legal Education Committee: This committee makes recommendations to the BCI on matters related to legal education and sets standards of legal education, visits and inspects universities, recommends the pre =requisites for foreign advocates practising law in India, recommends recognition or discontinuance of a law degree from a university. Justice A.P. Mishra, Former Judge of, the Supreme Court of India is the Chairman of the Legal Education Committee.
- Disciplinary Committee: This committee reviews applications by persons against summary dismissal of their complaints against advocates for professional misconduct, by the state bar councils and appeals against orders of the disciplinary committees of the state bar councils.
- Advocate Welfare Association: This committee looks into applications made by advocates for welfare funds. It verifies the application and provides funds. The Advocates Welfare Committee is certified by the Advocates Welfare Fund Act, 2001.
- Legal Aid Committee: The Legal Aid Committee provides aid to those requiring legal assistance.
- Building Committee: The Building Committee is responsible for setting up offices for the council.
- Rules Committee: The Rules Committee reviews the rules and regulations of the council.

Other than these, there are the Finance Committee, Special or Oversee Committee and All India Bar Examination Committee.

== Directorate of Legal Education ==
The Bar Council of India has established a Directorate of Legal Education to organise, run, conduct, hold, and administer the following:

1. Continuing Legal Education
2. Teachers training
3. Advanced specialised professional courses
4. Education program for Indian students seeking registration after obtaining a Law Degree from a Foreign University
5. Research on Professional Legal Education and Standardisation
6. Seminar and workshop
7. Legal Research
8. Any other assignment that may be assigned to it by the Legal Education Committee and the Bar Council of India.

== All India Bar Examination ==
On 10 April 2010, the Bar Council of India resolved to conduct an All India Bar Examination that tests an advocate's ability to practice law. It is required for an advocate to pass this examination to practice law. This examination is held biannually and tests advocate on substantive and procedural law. The syllabus for this examination has to be published at least three months before the examination. An advocate may appear for the examination any number of times. Once the advocate passes the examination, they will be entitled to a Certificate of Practice law throughout India. It is clarified that the Bar Examination shall be mandatory for all law students graduating from academic year 2009-2010 onwards and enrolled as advocates under Section 24 of the Advocates Act, 1961.

From 2020 onwards, the All India Bar Examination is being conducted only once a year. Moreover, AIBE is no longer an open-book examination as BCI banned reference material inside the exam centres in 2022. Candidates could only take Bare Acts without comments inside the examination hall. So far 16 editions of the AIBE examination have been conducted successfully allowing law graduates to obtain the Certificate of Practice. In 2022, BCI has also launched mobile application AIBESCOPE, available exclusively on the Google Playstore. BCI is planning to make the AIBE stricter than its previous editions, as the exam is an evaluation tool to ensure high-quality legal education and profession in India.

== See also ==
- Bar Council of Andhra Pradesh
- Bar Council of Telangana
- Bar Council of Delhi
- Bar Council of Karnataka
- Bar Council of Tamil Nadu and Puducherry
- Bar Council of Himachal Pradesh
- Bar Council of Kerala
- Bar Council of Bihar
- Bar Council of Gujarat
- Bar Council of Maharashtra and Goa
- Bar Council of Assam, Nagaland, Meghalaya, Manipur, Tripura, Mizoram, Arunachal Pradesh and Sikkim
- Bar Council of Madhya Pradesh
- Bar Council of Orissa
- Bar Council of Punjab and Haryana
- Bar Council of Rajasthan
- Bar Council of Uttar Pradesh
- Bar Council of West Bengal
- Bar Council of Jharkhand
- Bar Council of Uttarakhand
