= Rajashekhar Mantha =

Indian Judge

Hon'ble Justice Rajashekhar Mantha

Judge of Calcutta High Court
- Incumbent
- Assumed office 16 September 2019
- Nominated by: Ranjan Gogoi
- Appointed by: Ram Nath Kovind

Personal details
- Born: 29 October 1967 (age 58) Calcutta, West Bengal, India
- Education: Nagpur University; King's College London
- Profession: Judge at Calcutta High Court

Rajashekhar Mantha (born 29 October 1967) is an Indian judge who is serving as permanent judge of Calcutta High Court since 16 September 2019. Previously, he was an additional judge from 21 September 2017 to 15 September 2019.

== Early life and education ==
Mantha was born on 29 October 1967. He studied at St. Xavier's Collegiate School in Kolkata and St. Paul's Boarding and Day's School. He obtained an LL.B. in April 1990 from Nagpur University's College of Law and earned an LL.M. in Commercial Corporate Laws from King's College London in April 1991.

== Career ==
Mantha joined the Bar Council of West Bengal in December 1991 as a lawyer. He became a Senior Advocate in July 2015. He was nominated as an additional judge in High Court of Calcutta in 2017. He was promoted to permanent judge in 2019.

== Controversies ==
Mantha since 2022, give indefinite protection to Opposition Leader of West Bengal Suvendu Adhikari by halting most of the criminal prosecutions against him until the court decided his petition. In reaction, in January 2023 fifteen attorneys besieged his courtroom and reportedly engaged in a heated argument with other attorneys who refused to follow their directive to boycott. Later, the court initiates contempt proceedings against them. The Bar Council assures that there will no more disruptions after that.

On 9 January, Kolkata Police observed 1,000 posters had been stuck on Mantha's house at Jodhpur Park, as well as 30 other houses, walls, and on Jodhpur Park Boys' School. The posters depict Mantha protecting the BJP leaders. Under the court order, those posters were taken down, and 6 accused were arrested.
