= Legal Examination =

Legal Examination may refer to:

- Bar examination, an examination to become an attorney in a certain jurisdiction
  - Bar examination in the United States
  - National Unified Legal Professional Qualification Examination, often referred to as Legal Exam, China
  - All India Bar Examination
- Law School Admission Test, US
- Common Law Admission Test, for law schools in India
