= Zimbabwe Environmental Law Association =

Zimbabwean environmental law association

The Zimbabwe Environmental Law Association (ZELA) is a Zimbabwean legal organization founded in 2000. Is a non profit organization known for promoting the public interest of the people. They are focused at promoting environmental justice, sustainable natural resource governance and legal reform.

ZELO is an organization with the motive to empowers local communities through training, capacity building, giving them voices in natural resource management.
