= Annie John (judge) =

Hon'ble Justice Annie John

Judge Kerala High Court
- In office 30 November 2017 – 15 November 2019
- Appointed by: Ram Nath Kovind

Personal details
- Born: 16 November 1957 (age 68)
- Citizenship: Indian
- Education: Mahadeva Salgogar College of Law

Annie John (born 16 November 1957) is a former judge of Kerala High Court, the highest court in the Indian state of Kerala and in the union territory of Lakshadweep.

== Early life ==
She was born to Adv. John Madathil and Smt. Mariakutty John. She completed her schooling from Govt. LP School and UP School, Vaikom and St. Little Teresa's Convent School, Vaikom, graduated from Bharata Mata College, Thrikkakkara and obtained a law degree from Mahadeva Salgogar College of Law, Panaji, Goa.

== Career ==
She enrolled in the Bar Council of Kerala in 1982 and started practicing as an advocate with her father Adv. John Madathil. On 16 January 1989, she joined the Kerala Civil Judicial Service and served as Munsiff at North Paravur and Ernakulam, as Judicial First Class Magistrate in Perumbavoor, as Principal Munsiff in Irinjalakuda, as Sub-Judge in Cherthala, as Chief Judicial Magistrate at Palakkad, as District Judge of Thalassery, as Judge Motor Accident Claims Tribunal in Perumbavoor, as Judge Family Court at Thodupuzha, as District Judge in Thodupuzha, as District Judge in Alappuzha and Principal District & Sessions Judge at Thrissur. On 30 November 2017 she was appointed as an additional judge of the Kerala High Court and became the permanent judge from 29 August 2019. She demitted office upon the attainment of superannuation on 15 November 2019.
