= Manan Kumar Mishra =

Indian jurist

Member of Parliament, Rajya Sabha from Bihar
- Incumbent
- Assumed office 28 August 2024
- Preceded by: Misa Bharti

Chairman of the Bar Council of India
- Incumbent
- Assumed office 9 November 2014
- Preceded by: Biri Singh Sinsinwar

Personal details
- Born: Gopalganj, Bihar, India
- Party: Bharatiya Janata Party (2014-present)
- Other political affiliations: Indian National Congress (2010); Bahujan Samaj Party (2009)
- Education: Gopalganj College (BSc); Patna Law College, Patna University (LLB)
- Occupation: Lawyer

Manan Kumar Mishra is an Indian legal professional and jurist who has served as the chairman of the Bar Council of India (BCI), the apex statutory body regulating the legal profession and legal education in India. He is currently a member of the Rajya Sabha from Bihar, having been elected unopposed in August 2024 as the Bharatiya Janata Party nominee in a by-election necessitated by the election of Misa Bharti to the Lok Sabha.

== Early life and education ==
Manan Kumar Mishra was born in a Brahmin family in Gopalganj Bihar.

He pursued his early education in Gopalganj and later obtained a degree in law at Patna University. He was the gold medalist of his batch.

== Legal career ==
Mishra began his practice as an advocate at Patna High Court in 1982 and moved to the Supreme Court in 2009.

== Controversy ==
=== NALSAR enrolment controversy (2026) ===
In August 2026, Mishra, as chairman of the Bar Council of India (BCI), directed State Bar Councils across India not to enrol any 2026 graduate of NALSAR University of Law, Hyderabad. as an advocate. The order followed a student campaign objecting to the university's invitation to Chief Justice of India Surya Kant as chief guest for its convocation, reportedly linked to remarks Surya Kant had made during a July 2026 Supreme Court hearing on alleged police excesses against protesters in Delhi.

The BCI's initial circular alleged that "groupism" among faculty had misled and instigated students. The move drew criticism for penalising the entire graduating batch rather than only those involved in the protest, and calls for Mishra's resignation from some quarters, including the satirical Cockroach Janta Party. Within a day. Mishra reversed the decision in stages, first allowing enrolment to proceed pending inquiry and then dropping the proceedings entirely, sating students had no role in any disturbance.

The matter also reached the Supreme Court, where a bench ehaded by Surya Kant himself criticised the BCI's intervention as unnecessary, questioned the council's authority to act in the dispute, and affirmed the students' right to protest. The Court issued an interim order barring punitive action against NALSAR students or faculty over the episode and directed the BCI to file a formal response.
