= K. K. Manan =

Indian lawyer

K. K. Manan is a senior advocate at High Court of Delhi. On 21 March 2007, he was appointed as the Chairman of Bar Council of Delhi and held the office till 25 August 2008. He was again appointed as the chairman on 2 August 2014 and served until July 2018.
