= All India Bar Examination =

Indian bar examination

- Type: Bar examination, objective, open book
- Administrator: Bar Council of India
- Skills tested: Law of India
- Purpose: Admission to the bar
- Year started: 2012 (14 years ago)
- Duration: 3 hours
- Offered: Annually
- Restrictions on attempts: No limits
- Regions: India
- Languages: 12, including English, Hindi and other regional languages
- Prerequisites: Bachelor of Laws and State Bar Council enrollment
- Fee: ₹3,500 (general)
- Website: allindiabarexamination.com

All India Bar Examination (AIBE) is a bar examination conducted by Bar Council of India for law graduates for admission to practice law. The candidate is awarded a certificate of practice after clearing the examination and is eligible to practice in any court in India. The exam is conducted in 53 cities of India in national and regional languages.

== Objective ==
All India Bar Examination (AIBE) is a certification exam conducted once a year by the Bar Council of India for law graduates willing to start practice as a lawyer. The exam is conducted in 53 cities in 261 centres as an open book exam. It is conducted to assess basic legal knowledge and lay down a minimum benchmark for entering into practice of law in addition to assessing a candidate's analytical skills. After clearing the AIBEd a certificate of practice by Bar Council of India. Qualified member in the exam can attend court hearings in any tribunal, court or administrative bodies. The exam is multi-choice and is conducted offline for a 3 hour duration.

== Eligibility ==
AIBE carries these eligibility requirements:

- Members should hold a law degree (3-Year/5-Year) from a recognised institute of law approved by the Bar Council of India and be enrolled in a State Bar Council.
- No upper age limit for appearing in the exam.
- In 2024, the Supreme Court of India allowed final-year law students to appear AIBE.

== Procedure ==
The AIBE follows this procedure:

- All India Bar Examination registration.
- Examination.
- Provisional answer key release.
- Any discrepancies in the provisional answer key can be challenged before the assigned last date.
- Announcement of results by the Bar Council of India.

== Languages ==
All India Bar Examination is conducted in English, Hindi, Telugu, Tamil, Kannada, Marathi, Bengali, Gujarati, Odia, Assamese, Punjabi languages.

== See also ==
- Legal education in India
- Law of India
