= Bar Council of Andhra Pradesh =

Representative body for Andhra Pradesh lawyers

Statutory body overview
- Formed: 1961; 65 years ago
- Headquarters: AMARAVATI
- Statutory body executives: Sri Rama Rao, Ghanta, Chairman; Sri Rama Jogeswara Rao, Kirti, Vice Chairman
- Website: https://barcouncilap.org/about-us/

Bar Council of Andhra Pradesh is the regulatory and statutory representative body for lawyers practicing law in the state of Andhra Pradesh. It was constituted as per the mandatory requirement as per Advocates Act, 1961 and Bar Council of India. In March 1953, the 'All India Bar Committee', headed by S. R. Das, submitted a report which proposed the creation of a bar council for each state and an all-India bar council as an apex body. Members of the Bar Council are elected from among members enrolled and practicing as lawyers in the state of Andhra Pradesh and they represent the state in Bar Council of India meetings. Bar Council of a place designs standards of professional conduct to be followed by members, and designs etiquettes and has the power to enforce disciplinary guidelines over the members of bar council.

== History ==
Bar Council of Andhra Pradesh was formed as per the requirement of Section 3 of Advocates Act, 1961 which mandates for each state of India to have its Bar Council. Accordingly, in July 2018, the Andhra Pradesh State Bar Council was formed. As per the guidelines the legal profession in India and the standards of legal education would be regulated by All India Bar Council. The Law Commission of India was assigned the job of assembling a report on judicial administration reforms.

In July 2021, the state Bar Council along with Bar Councils of other Southern states of India had requested the Vice-president Mr Venkaiah Naidu and Supreme Court Chief Justice Hon. N. V. Ramana for the setting up of separate bench for Southern India.

== Functions ==
Section 7 of the Advocates Act, 1961 lays down the Bar Council's regulatory and representative mandate. Bar Councils of each place has following functions:

1. Facilitating the election with rules for members to get elected and managing the Bar Council.
2. Designing the professional behaviours and code to be followed by advocates who are its members..
3. Laying down guidelines for disciplinary committees and other committees formed by it.
4. Protecting the advocate members rights, benefits, and safeguarding their interests.
5. Designing, promoting and supporting law reform as per changing circumstances.
6. Handling and resolving other issues or any matter placed before it by its members in ad hoc situations.
7. Designing and promoting legal education in country and states.
8. Designing and organising seminars on wide legal topics in the interest of members by reputed jurists and publishing them in journals and magazines of legal circles and other sources of media.
9. Facilitating legal aid to those who can't afford it.
10. Ensuring that guidelines laid in various legal forums are followed by members.

In 2020, as COVID relief, the Andhra Pradesh Bar Council offered financial assistance to its members and asked the needful members to apply online.

== Constitution ==
The council elects its own chairman and vice-chairman for a period of two years from amongst its members. Assisted by the various committees of the council, the chairman acts as the chief executive and director of the council. Voting rights in elections are available only for advocates having Certificate of Practice. Till 2018, there were around 97,600 enrolled as members of the State Bar Council. As per the Advocates Act, the bar council of the state should have 25 members in case the members on roll exceeds 10000, the same has been followed by Andhra Pradesh Bar Council.

== Enrollment of advocates ==
Graduates having a law degree from recognised universities permitted to impart legal education are admitted as advocates in Andhra Pradesh Bar Council. Law graduates can enroll online for Andhra Pradesh Bar Council. State bar councils are empowered by Advocates Act, 1961 to frame rules according to their convenience for enrolling advocates in council. Enrollment committee formed by Councils will scrutinise a prospective member's application. Enrolled advocates of any bar council in state are considered as eligible to write the All India Bar Examination conducted by Bar Council of India. After clearing the exam, he is certified by Bar Council of India and issued 'Certificate of Enrolment', which facilitates him to practice the profession of law in any High Court based in India and lower courts of the country, as an advocate. Advocates are required to qualify in the exam known as "Supreme Court Advocate on Record Examination" which is conducted by the Supreme Court exclusively to practice in the Supreme Court of Country.

== See also ==
- Bar Council of Telangana
