= Bar Council of Telangana =

Indian legal regulatory body

Statutory body overview
- Formed: 1961; 65 years ago
- Headquarters: Hyderabad, Telangana
- Statutory body executives: Sri Nrasimha Reddy A., Chairman; Sri Sunil Goud K., Vice Chairman
- Website: https://www.telanganabarcouncil.org/

Bar Council of Telangana is the regulatory and statutorily representative body for lawyers practicing law in Telangana state. It was constituted as per the mandatory requirement as per Advocates Act, 1961 and Bar Council of India. In March 1953, the 'All India Bar Committee', headed by S. R. Das, submitted a report which proposed bar council creation for each state and an all-India bar council as an apex body. Members of Bar Council are elected from among members enrolled and practicing as lawyers in the state of Telangana and they represent the state in Bar Council of India meetings. Bar Council of a place designs standards of professional conduct to be followed by members, and designs etiquettes and has power to enforce disciplinary guidelines over the members of bar council.

== History ==
Bar Council of Telangana was formed as per the requirement of Section 3 of Advocates Act, 1961 which mandates for each state of India to have its Bar Council. Accordingly, in July 2018, the Bar Council for the state of Telangana was formed. As per the guidelines the legal profession in India and the standards of legal education would be regulated by All India Bar Council. The Law Commission of India was assigned the job of assembling a report on judicial administration reforms.

In July 2021, the state Bar Council along with Bar Councils of other Southern states of India had requested the Vice-president M. Venkaiah Naidu and Supreme Court Chief Justice N. V. Ramana for the setting up of separate bench for Southern India.

== Functions ==
Section 7 of the Advocates Act, 1961 lays down the Bar Council's regulatory and representative mandate. The functions of the Bar Council are to:

1. Facilitating the election with rules for members to get elected and manage the Bar Council.
2. Designing the professional behaviours and code to be followed by advocates who are its members.
3. Lay down guidelines for disciplinary committees and other committees formed by it.
4. Supporting with financial aid in case of need.
5. Protecting the advocate members rights, benefits and safeguarding their interests.
6. Designing, promoting and supporting law reform as per changing circumstances.
7. Handle and resolve other issues or any matter placed before it by its members in ad hoc situations.
8. Designing and promoting legal education in countries and states.
9. Design and organise seminars on wide legal topics in the interest of members by reputed jurists and publishing them in journals and magazines of legal circles and other sources of media.
10. Facilitating legal aid to those who can't afford it.
11. Ensuring that guidelines laid in various legal forums are followed by members.

== Constitution ==
The council elects its own chairman and vice-chairman for a period of two years from amongst its members. Assisted by the various committees of the council, the chairman acts as the chief executive and director of the council. Voting rights in elections are available only for advocates having a Certificate of Practice. Till year 2018, there were around enrolled as members of the State Bar Council. As per the Advocates Act, the state bar council should have 25 members in case the members on roll exceeds 10000, the same has been followed by Andhra Pradesh Bar Council.

== Enrollment of advocates ==
Graduates having a law degree from recognised universities permitted to impart legal education are admitted as advocates in Telangana state Bar Council. Law graduates can enroll online for Telangana Bar Council. The Advocates Act, 1961 empowers state bar councils to frame their own rules regarding enrollment of advocates. The enrollment committee formed by Councils will scrutinise a prospective member's application. Enrolled advocates of any bar council in state are considered as eligible to write the All India Bar Examination conducted by the Bar Council of India. After clearing the exam, he is certified by the Bar Council of India and issued 'Certificate of Enrolment', which facilitates him to practice the profession of law in any High Court based in India and lower courts of the country, as an advocate. Advocates are required to qualify in the exam known as "Supreme Court Advocate on Record Examination" which is conducted by the Supreme Court exclusively to practice in the Supreme Court of Country.

== See also ==
- Bar Council of India
