= Law Commission of India =

Indian executive body

- Formation: First time in 1834; (Current in 2024)
- Type: Agency of Government of India
- Legal status: Ad hoc, term based
- Purpose: Law Reform in India
- Headquarters: New Delhi
- Location(s): Second and forth floors, "B" Wing, Lok Nayak Bhawan, Khan Market, New Delhi- 110003.
- Members: Chairman, 2 permanent members(including member secretary), 2 part-time members, 2 ex-officio members
- Chairman: Justice (Retd.) Bibash Paudel (23rd Law Commission)
- Full-time member: Prof. D P Verma, Hitesh Jain
- Website: www.lawcommissionofindia.nic.in

The Law Commission of India is an executive body established by an order of the Government of India. The commission's function is to research and advise the government on legal reform, and is composition of legal experts, and headed by a retired judge. The commission is established for a fixed tenure and works as an advisory body to the Ministry of Law and Justice.

The first Law Commission was established during colonial rule in India by the East India Company under the Charter Act 1833 and was presided over by Lord Macaulay. After that, three more commissions were established in British India. The first Law Commission of independent India was established in 1955 for a three-year term. Since then, twenty-two more commissions have been established. On 7 November 2022, Justice Rituraj Awasthi (Former Chief Justice of the Karnataka HC) was appointed as the chairperson of the 22nd Law Commission and Justice KT Sankaran, Prof.(Dr.) Anand Paliwal, Prof. DP Verma, Prof. (Dr) Raka Arya and Shri M. Karunanithi as members of the commission.

== Evolution of Law Commission in India ==
The origin of the first Law Commission of India lies in the diverse and often conflicting laws prevailing in the local regions and those administered by the East India Company, which was granted royal charters and also conferred powers by the various Indian rulers to administer and oversee the conduct of the inhabitants in the local areas where the company exercised control. During this period of administration by the company, two sets of laws operated in the areas; one which applied to and in relation to British citizens and the second which applied to the local inhabitants and aliens. This was considered as a major stumbling block for proper administration by the British government during the times which is now known as the British Raj. In order to improve the law-and-order situation and also to ensure uniformity of legal administration, various options were looked for. Until then the British government had been passing various enactments to deal with particular situations, such as the Prohibition of Sati in (1829) by Lord William Bentinck under the influence of Raja Ram Mohan Roy. However, it was for the first time in (1833) that the idea to establish a Law Commission for a comprehensive examination of the existing legal system prevailing in the British administered areas and its overhaul was instituted.

== Pre-Independence Law Commissions of India ==
The first Law Commission was established in 1834 by the British government under the chairmanship of Lord Macaulay. It suggested various enactments to the British government, most of which were passed and enacted and are still in force in India. Few of the most important recommendations made by this first Law Commission were those on the Indian Penal Code (first submitted in 1837 but enacted in 1860 and still in force), Criminal Procedure Code (enacted in 1898, repealed and succeeded by the Criminal Procedure Code of 1973), etc. Thereafter three more Law Commissions were established which made a number of other recommendations the Indian Evidence Act (1872) and Indian Contract Act (1872), etc. being some of the significant ones. The contribution of these Law Commissions can be enumerated as under.

	First Pre-Independence Law Commission	Second Pre-Independence Law Commission	Third Pre-Independence Law Commission	Fourth Pre-Independence Law Commission
Established	1834	1853	1861	1879
Chairman	Lord Macaulay	Sir John Romilly	Sir John Romilly	Dr. Whitley Stokes
Members	(1) J.M. Macleod, (2) G.W. Anderson, and (3) F. Millet	(1) Sir Lord Jervis, (2) Sir Edward Ryan, (3) R. Lowe, (4) J.M. Macleod, (5) C.H. Cameron, and (6) T.E. Ellis	Initially (1) Sir Edward Ryan, (2) R. Lowe, (3) J.M. Macleod, (4) Sir W. Erle, and (5) Justice Wills. Subsequently, Sir W. Erle, and Justice Wills succeeded by Sir W.M. James and J. Henderson. Later J. Henderson replaced by Justice Lush.	(1) Sir Charles Turner, and (2) Raymond West
Reports	Penal Code (2 May 1837)	Code of Civil Procedure and Law of Limitation (1859)	A code for Succession and Inheritance for Indians other than Hindus and Muslims (1865)	Code of Negotiable Instruments (1881)
	Lex Loci (role and authority of English law in India) (31 October 1840)	Penal Code (1860)	Draft Contract Law (1866)	Code on Trusts Law (1882)
	–	Code of Criminal Procedure (1861)	Draft Negotiable Instruments Law (1867)	Code on Transfer of Property and Easements (1882)
	–	–	Draft Evidence Law (1868)	Revised Code of Criminal Procedure (1882)
	–	–	Revision of Code of Criminal Procedure (1870)	Revised Code of Civil Procedure (1882)
	–	–	Draft Transfer of Property Law (1870)	–
	–	–	Draft Code on Insurance (1871)	–

A two-member Viceroy's Executive Council (composed of Sir Henry Maine and Sir James Fitzjames Stephen) also worked on the side-lines of the Law Commissions and ensured the passage of the following noteworthy laws;

- 1863 - Religious Endowments Act
- 1864 - Official Trustees Act
- 1865 - Carriers Act
- 1865 - Parsi Marriage and Divorce Act
- 1865 - Parsi Intestate Succession Act
- 1866 - Indian Companies Act
- 1866 - Native Converts Marriage Dissolution Act
- 1866 – Trustees Act
- 1866 – Trustees and Mortgage Powers Act
- 1867 – Press and Registration of Books Act
- 1868 – General Clauses Act
- 1869 – Divorce Act
- 1870 – Court Fees Act
- 1870 – Land Acquisition Act
- 1870 – Female Infanticide Act
- 1870 – Female Infanticide Prevention Act
- 1870 – Hindu Wills Act
- 1872 – Code of Criminal Procedure (revised)
- 1872 – Indian Contract Act
- 1872 – Indian Evidence Act
- 1872 – Special Marriages Act
- 1872 – Punjab Laws Act

== Law Commissions in Independent India ==
The tradition of pursuing law reform through the medium of a law commission was continued in post-independent India. The first law commission in independent India was established in 1955 and since then twenty-two more law commissions have been established. Each of these commissions have been chaired by a prominent legal personality in India and has made a significant contribution to the legal diaspora of India. The contribution of each of these commissions has been enumerated below.

=== First Law Commission ===
The First Law Commission of independent India was established in 1955. The chairman of this commission was M. C. Setalvad, who was also the first attorney-general of India. The term of this commission was established as three years (which by convention has been followed till date) and this commission submitted its last report on 26 September 1958. The reports submitted by the First Law Commission of India are as under.

Report no.	Date of presentation	Title of report
1	11 May 1956	Liability of the State in Tort
2	2 July 1956	Parliamentary Legislation relating to Sales Tax
3	21 July 1956	Limitation Act, 1908
4	1 August 1956	On the proposal that High Courts should sit in Benches at different places in a State
5	11 May 1957	British Statutes Applicable to India
6	13 July 1957	Registration Act, 1908
7	13 July 1957	Partnership Act, 1932
8	1 March 1958	Sale of Goods Act, 1930
9	19 July 1958	Specific Relief Act, 1877
10	26 September 1958	Law of Acquisition and Requisitioning of Law
11	26 September 1958	Negotiable Instruments Act, 1881
12	26 September 1958	Income Tax Act, 1922
13	26 September 1958	Contract Act, 1872
14	26 September 1958	Reform of Judicial Administration

=== Second Law Commission ===
The Second Law Commission was established in 1958 under the chairmanship of Justice T. V. Venkatarama Aiyar. It stayed in office till 1961. It presented the following reports.

Report no.	Presented in	Title of report
15	1960	Law relating to Marriage and Divorce amongst Christians in India
16	1960	Official Trustees Act, 1913
17	1961	Report on Trusts Act, 1882
18	1961	Converts' Marriage Dissolution Act, 1866
19	1961	The Administrator-General's Act, 1913
20	1961	The Law of Hire-Purchase
21	1961	Marine Insurance
22	1961	Christian Marriage and Matrimonial Causes Bill, 1961

=== Third Law Commission ===
The Third Law Commission was established in 1961 under the chairmanship of Justice J. L. Kapur. It stayed in office till 1964. It presented the following reports.

Report no.	Presented in	Title of report
23	1962	Law of Foreign Marriages
24	1962	The Commission of Inquiry Act, 1952
25	1963	Evidence of Officers about forged stamps, currency notes, etc. Section 509-A Cr.P.C. as proposed
26	1964	Insolvency Laws
27	1964	The Code of Civil Procedure, 1908
28	1964	The Indian Oaths Act, 1873

=== Fourth Law Commission ===
The Fourth Law Commission was established in 1964 and was again under the chairmanship of Justice J. L. Kapur. It stayed in office till 1968. It presented the following reports.

Report no.	Presented in	Title of report
29	1967	Proposal to include certain Social and Economic Offences in the Indian Penal Code, 1860
30	1967	Section 5 of the Central Sales Tax Act, 1956, taxation by the States in the course of import
31	1967	Section 30(2) of the Indian Registration Act, 1908 – Extension to Delhi
32	1967	Section 9 of the Code of Criminal Procedure, 1898
33	1967	Section 44 of the Code of Criminal Procedure, 1898
34	1967	Indian Registration Act, 1908
35	1967	Capital Punishment
36	1967	Section 497, 498 and 499 of the Code of Criminal Procedure, 1898
37	1967	The Code of Criminal Procedure, 1898
38	1968	Indian Post Office Act, 1898

=== Fifth Law Commission ===
The Fifth Law Commission was established in 1968 under the chairmanship of K. V. K. Sundaram. It stayed in office till 1971. It presented the following reports.

Report no.	Presented in	Title of report
39	1968	Punishment for imprisonment for life under the Indian Penal Code
40	1969	Law relating to attendance of Prisoners in Courts
41	1969	The Code of Criminal Procedure, 1898
42	1971	Indian Penal Code
43	1971	Offences against the National Security
44	1971	The Appellate Jurisdiction of the Supreme Court in Civil Matters

=== Sixth Law Commission ===
The Sixth Law Commission was established in 1971 under the chairmanship of Justice P. B. Gajendragadkar. It stayed in office till 1974. It presented the following reports.

Report no.	Presented in	Title of report
45	1971	Civil Appeals to the Supreme Court on a Certificate of Fitness
46	1971	The Constitution (Twenty-Fifth Amendment) Bill, 1971
47	1972	The trial and punishment of Social and Economic Offences
48	1972	Some questions under the Code of Criminal Procedure Bill, 1970
49	1972	The proposal for inclusion of agricultural income in the total income
50	1972	The proposal to include persons connected with the Public examination within the definition of 'Public Servant'
51	1972	Compensation of injuries caused by automobiles in hit-and-run cases
52	1972	Estate duty on property acquired after death
53	1972	Effect of the Pensions Act, 1871 on the right to sue for pensions of retired members of public service
54	1973	The Code of Civil Procedure, 1908
55	1973	Rate of Interest after decree and interest on costs under Section 34 and 35 of the Code of Civil Procedure, 1908
56	1973	Statutory Provision as to the Notice of Suit other than Section 80, Civil Procedure Code, 1908
57	1973	Benami Transactions
58	1974	Stature and Jurisdiction of the Higher Judiciary
59	1974	Hindu Marriage Act, 1955 and Special Marriage Act, 1954
60	1974	The General Clauses Act, 1897
61	1974	Certain problems with the power of the States to levy a tax on the sale of goods

=== Seventh Law Commission ===
The Seventh Law Commission was established in 1974 again under the chairmanship of Justice P. B. Gajendragadkar. It stayed in office till 1977. It presented the following reports.

Report no.	Presented in	Title of report
62	1974	Workmen's Compensation Act, 1923
63	1975	The Interest Act, 1839
64	1975	The Suppression of Immoral Traffic in Women and Girls Act, 1956
65	1976	Recognition of Foreign Divorces
66	1976	Married Women's Property Act, 1874
67	1977	The Indian Stamp Act, 1899
68	1977	The Power of Attorney Act, 1882
69	1977	The Indian Evidence Act, 1872
70	1977	The Transfer of Property Act, 1882

=== Eighth Law Commission ===
The Eighth Law Commission was established in 1977 under the chairmanship of Justice H. R. Khanna. It stayed in office till 1979. It presented the following reports.

Report no.	Presented in	Title of report
71	1978	Irretrievable breakdown of marriage as a ground for divorce
72	1978	Restriction on practice after being a permanent judge
73	1978	Criminal liability for failure by husband to pay maintenance or permanent alimony granted to the wife
74	1978	Proposal to amend the Indian Evidence Act, 1872 so as to render Admissible certain statements made by witnesses before Commissions of Inquiry and other Statutory Authorities
75	1978	Disciplinary jurisdiction under the Advocates Act, 1961
76	1978	Arbitration Act, 1940
77	1979	Delay and arrears in trial courts
78	1979	Congestion of under trial persons in jails
79	1979	Delays and arrears in High Courts and other Appellate Courts
80	1979	Method of Appointment of Judges

=== Ninth Law Commission ===
The Ninth Law Commission was established in 1979 under the chairmanship of Justice P. V. Dixit. It stayed in office till 1980. It presented the following reports.

Report no.	Presented in	Title of report
81	1979	Hindu Widows Remarriage Act, 1856
82	1980	Effect of nomination under Section 39, Insurance Act, 1938
83	1980	The Guardian and Wards Act, 1890
84	1980	Rape and allied offences-some questions of substantive law, procedure and evidence
85	1980	Claims for compensation under Chapter 8 of the Motor Vehicles Act, 1939
86	1980	The Partition Act, 1893
87	1980	Identification of Prisoners Act, 1920

=== Tenth Law Commission ===
The Tenth Law Commission was established in 1981 under the chairmanship of Justice K. K. Mathew. It stayed in office till 1985. It presented the following reports.

Report no.	Presented in	Title of report
88	1983	Governmental Privileges in Evidence
89	1983	The Limitation Act, 1963
90	1983	The Grounds for Divorce amongst Christians in India
91	1983	Dowry deaths and law reform
92	1983	Damages in applications for Judicial Review Recommendations for legislation
93	1983	Disclosures of sources of information by mass media
94	1983	Evidence obtained illegally or improperly
95	1984	Constitutional Division within Supreme Court
96	1984	Repeal of certain obsolete Central Acts
97	1984	Section 28 of the Indian Contract Act, 1872: prescriptive clauses in contracts
98	1984	Sections 24 to 26 of the Hindu Marriage Act, 1955
99	1984	Oral and written arguments in the Higher courts
100	1984	Litigation by and against the Government
101	1984	Freedom of Speech and Expression under Article 19 of the Constitution
102	1984	Section 122(1) of the Code of Criminal Procedure, 1973
103	1984	Unfair Terms in contracts
104	1984	The Judicial Officers' Protection Act, 1850
105	1984	Quality control and inspection of consumer goods
106	1984	Section 103A, Motor Vehicles Act, 1939
107	1984	Law of Citizenship
108	1984	Promissory Estoppel
109	1985	Obscene and Indecent Advertisements and Displays
110	1985	Indian Succession Act, 1925
111	1985	Fatal Incidents Act, 1955
112	1985	Section 45 of the Insurance Act, 1938
113	1985	Injuries in Police Custody

=== Eleventh Law Commission ===
The Eleventh Law Commission was established in 1985 under the chairmanship of Justice D. A. Desai. It stayed in office till 1988. It presented the following reports.

Report no.	Presented in	Title of report
114	1986	Gram Nyayalaya
115	1986	Tax Courts
116	1986	Formation of an All India Judicial Service
117	1986	Training of Judicial Officers
118	1986	Method of appointment to subordinate courts
119	1987	Access to Exclusive Forum for victims of motor accidents
120	1987	Manpower planning in Judiciary
121	1987	A new forum for Judicial Appointments
122	1987	Forum for National uniformity in Labour Adjudication
123	1988	Decentralization in Administration of Justice
124	1988	The High Court Arrears – A fresh look
125	1988	The Supreme Court – A fresh look
126	1988	Government and Public Sector Undertaking Litigation policy and Strategies
127	1988	Resource Allocation for Infra-Structural Services in Judicial Administration
128	1988	Cost of Litigation
129	1988	Urban Litigation – Mediation as alternative to Litigation
130	1988	Benami Transactions : A continuum
131	1988	Role of legal profession in Administration of Justice

=== Twelfth Law Commission ===
The Twelfth Law Commission was established in 1988 under the chairmanship of Justice Manharlal Pranlal Thakkar. It stayed in office till 1989. It presented the following reports.

Report no.	Presented in	Title of report
132	1989	Need for Amendment of the Provisions of the Chapter IX of the Code of Criminal Procedure, 1973 in order to ameliorate the hardship and mitigate the distress of Neglected Women, Children and Parents
133	1989	Removal of discrimination against Women in matters relating to Guardianship and Custody of Minor Children and Elaboration of the Welfare Principle
134	1989	Removing Deficiencies in certain provisions of the Workmen's Compensation Act, 1923
135	1989	Women in Custody
136	1990	Conflicts in High Court decisions on Central Laws – How to foreclose and how to resolve
137	1990	Need for creating office of Ombudsman
138	1990	Legislative Protection for Slum and Pavement Dwellers
139	1991	Urgent need to amend Order XXI, Rule 92(2), Civil Procedure Code, 1908
140	1991	Need to amend Order V, Rule 19A of the Civil Procedure Code, 1908
141	1991	Need for amending the laws as regards power of courts to resolve criminal revisional applications and criminal cases dismissed for default in appearance
142	1991	Confessional treatment for offenders who on their own initiative choose to plead guilty without any bargaining
143	1991	Legislative safeguards for protecting the small depositors from exploitation

=== Thirteenth Law Commission ===
The Thirteenth Law Commission was established in 1991 under the chairmanship of Justice K. N. Singh. It stayed in office till 1994. It presented the following reports.

Report no.	Presented in	Title of report
144	1992	Conflicting Judicial decisions pertaining to the Code of Civil Procedure, 1908
145	1992	Article 12 of the Constitution and Public Sector Undertakings
146	1993	Sale of Women and Children: Proposed Section 373-A, Indian Penal Code
147	1993	The Specific Relief Act, 1963
148	1993	Repeal of Certain pre-1947 Central Acts
149	1994	Removal of certain deficiencies in the Motor Vehicles Act, 1988 (Act No. 59 of 1988)
150	1994	Suggesting some Amendments to the Code of Civil Procedure (Act No. V of 1908)
151	1994	Admiralty Jurisdiction
152	1994	Custodial Crimes
153	1994	Inter-Country Adoption

=== Fourteenth Law Commission ===
The Fourteenth Law Commission was established in 1995 under the chairmanship of Justice K. Jayachandra Reddy. It stayed in office till 1997. It presented the following reports.

Report no.	Date of presentation	Title of report
154	22 August 1996	The Code of Criminal Procedure, 1973 (Act No. 2 of 1974)
155	12 July 1997	The Narcotics Drugs and Psychotropic Substances Act, 1985(Act No. 61 of 1985)
156	30 August 1997	The Indian Penal Code

=== Fifteenth Law Commission ===
The Fifteenth Law Commission was established in 1997 under the chairmanship of Justice B. P. Jeevan Reddy. It stayed in office till 2000. It presented the following reports.

Report no.	Presented in	Title of report
157	1998	Section 52:Transfer of Property Act, 1882 and its Amendment
158	1998	The Amendment of the Industries (Development and Regulation) Act, 1951
159	1998	Repeal and Amendment of Laws: Part I
160	1998	Amendment to the All India Council for Technical Education Act, 1987 (Act No. 52 of 1987)
161	1998	Central Vigilance Commission and Allied Bodies
162	1998	Review of functioning of Central Administrative Tribunal, Customs, Excise and Gold (Control) Appellate Tribunal and Income-Tax Appellate Tribunal
163	1998	The Code of Civil Procedure (Amendment) Bill, 1997
164	1998	The Indian Divorce Act, 1869 (Act IV of 1869)
165	1998	Free and Compulsory Education for Children
166	1999	The Corrupt Public Servants (forfeiture of property) Bill
167	1999	The Patents (Amendment) Bill, 1998
168	1999	The Hire-Purchase Act, 1972
169	1999	Amendment of Army, Navy and Air Force Act
170	1999	Reform of Electoral Laws
171	2000	The Biodiversity Bill, 2000
172	2000	Review of Rape Laws
173	2000	Prevention of Terrorism Bill, 2000
174	2000	Property Rights of Women: Proposed Reforms Under the Hindu Law

=== Sixteenth Law Commission ===
The Sixteenth Law Commission was established in 2000. For the period till 2001 Justice B. P. Jeevan Reddy continued as the chairman of the commission while in the period between 2002 and 2003 the commission worked under the chairmanship of Justice M. Jagannadha Rao. It presented the following reports.

Report no.	Presented in	Title of report
175	2000	The Foreigners (Amendment) Bill, 2000
176	2001	The Arbitration and conciliation (Amendment) Bill, 2002
177	2001	Law Relating to Arrest
178	2001	Recommendations for amending various enactments, both civil and criminal
179	2001	Public Interest Disclosure and Protection of Informers
180	2002	Article 20 (3) of the Constitution of India and Right to Silence
181	2002	Amendment to Section 106 of the Transfer of Property Act, 1882
182	2002	Amendment of Section 6 of the Land Acquisition Act, 1894
183	2002	A Continuum on the General Clauses Act, 1897 with special reference to the admissibility and codification of external aids to interpretation of statutes
184	2002	Legal Education & Professional Training and Proposals for amendments to the Advocates Act, 1961 and the University Grants Commission Act, 1956
185	2003	Review of the Indian Evidence Act, 1872

=== Seventeenth Law Commission ===
The Seventeenth Law Commission was established in 2003 and continued to be under the chairmanship of Justice M. Jagannadha Rao. It stayed in office till 2006. It presented the following reports.

Report no.	Presented in	Title of report
186	2003	Proposal to Constitute Environment Courts
187	2003	Mode of Execution of Death Sentence and Incidental Matters
188	2003	The Proposals for Constitution of Hi-Tech Fast – Track Commercial Divisions in High Courts
189	2004	Revision of Court Fees Structure
190	2004	The Revision of the Insurance Act, 1938 and the Insurance Regulatory and Development Authority Act, 1999
191	2004	Regulation of Funds collected for Calamity Relief.
192	2005	Prevention of vexatious Litigation
193	2005	Transnational Litigation, Conflict of Laws, Law of Limitation
194	2005	Verification of Stamp Duties and Registration of Arbitral Awards
195	2006	The Judges (Inquiry) Bill, 2005
196	2006	Medical Treatment to Terminally Ill Patients (Protection of Patients and Medical Practitioners)
197	2006	Public Prosecutor's Appointments
198	2006	Witness Identity Protection and Witness Protection Programmes
199	2006	Unfair (Procedural and Substantive) Terms in Contracts
200	2006	Trial by Media : Free Speech Vs. Fair Trial Under Criminal Procedure (Amendments to the Contempt of Court Act, 1971)
201	2006	Medical Treatment after Accidents and During Emergency Medical Condition and Women in Labour

=== Eighteenth Law Commission ===
The Eighteenth Law Commission of India was established on 1 September 2006 and continued till 31 August 2009. Justice M. Jagannadha Rao continued to serve as the chairman of the commission until 28 May 2007 on which date Justice A. R. Lakshmanan was appointed as the chairman of the commission. It presented the following reports.

Report no.	Date of presentation	Title of report
202	9 October 2007	Proposal to Amend Section 304-B of the Indian Penal Code
203	26 December 2007	Section 438 of the Code of Criminal Procedure, 1973 as Amended by the Code of Criminal Procedure (Amendment) Act, 2005 (Anticipatory Bail)
204	5 February 2008	Proposal to Amend the Hindu Succession Act, 1956 as amended by Act 39 of 2005
205	5 February 2008	Proposal to Amend the Prohibition of Child Marriage Act, 2006 and other allied Laws
206	10 June 2008	Proposal for enactment of new Coroners Act applicable to the whole of India
207	10 June 2008	Proposal to amend Section 15 of the Hindu Succession Act, 1956 in case a female dies intestate leaving herself acquired property with no heirs
208	30 July 2008	Proposal for the amendment of explanation to Section 6 of the Hindu Succession Act, 1956 to include oral partition and family arrangement on the definition of 'partition'
209	30 July 2008	Proposal for the omission of Section 213 from the Indian Succession Act, 1925
210	17 October 2008	Humanization and Decriminalization of Attempt to Suicide
211	17 October 2008	Laws on Registration of Marriages and Divorce – A proposal for Consolidation and Reform
212	17 October 2008	Laws of Civil Marriage in India – A proposal to Resolve Certain Conflicts
213	24 November 2008	Fast Track Magisterial Courts for Dishonoured Cheque Cases
214	21 November 2008	Proposal for reconsideration of Judges Case I, II and III – S P Gupta Vs, UOI
215	17 December 2008	L. Chandra Kumar be revisited by Larger Bench of Supreme Court
216	17 December 2008	Non-Feasibility of introduction of Hindi as compulsory language in the Supreme Court of India
217	30 March 2009	Irretrievable Breakdown of Marriage – Another Ground for Divorce
218	30 March 2009	Need to accede to the Hague Convention on the Civil Aspects of International Child Abduction (1980)
219	30 March 2009	Need for Family Law Legislations for Non-resident Indians
220	30 March 2009	Need to fix Maximum Chargeable Court-fees in Subordinate Civil Courts
221	30 April 2009	Need for Speedy Justice – Some Suggestions
222	30 April 2009	Need for Justice-dispensation through ADR etc.
223	30 April 2009	Need for Ameliorating the lot of the Have-nots – Supreme Court's judgments
224	2009	Amendment of Section 2 of the Divorce Act 1869 Enabling Non-domiciled Estranged Christian Wives to seek Divorce.
225	2009	Amendment of Sections 7, 7A, and 7B of Industrial Disputes Act 1947 Making Advocates Eligible to man Labour Courts and Industrial Tribunals. 2009
226	2009	The Inclusion of Acid Attacks as Specific Offences in the Indian Penal Code and a Law for Compensation for Victims of Crime.
227	2009	Preventing Bigamy via Conversion to Islam – A Proposal for giving Statutory Effect to Supreme Court Rulings
228	2009	Need For Legislation to Regulate Assisted Reproductive Technology Clinics as Well as Rights and Obligations of Parties to a Surrogacy
229	2009	Need for division of the Supreme Court into a Constitution Bench at Delhi and Cassation Benches in four regions at Delhi, Chennai/ Hyderabad, Kolkata and Mumbai
230	2009	Reforms in the Judiciary – Some suggestions
231	2009	Amendments in Indian Stamp Act 1899 And Court-Fees Act 1870 Permitting Different Modes of Payment
232	2009	Retirement Age of chairpersons and Members of Tribunals – Need for Uniformity
233	2009	Amendment of Code of Criminal Procedure Enabling Restoration of Complaints
234	2009	Legal Reforms to Combat Road Accidents

=== Nineteenth Law Commission ===
The nineteenth Law Commission of India's chairman was Justice P. V. Reddi, 2009–2012.

Report no.	Presented in	Title of report
235	2010	Conversion/reconversion to another religion – mode of proof
236	2010	Court-fees in Supreme Court vis-à-vis Corporate Litigation
237	2011	Compounding of (IPC) offences
238	2011	Amendment of Section 89 of the Code of Civil Procedure, 1908 and Allied provisions
239	2012	Expeditious Investigation and Trial of Criminal Cases Against 2012 Influential Public Personalities
240	2012	Costs in Civil Litigation
241	2012	Passive Euthanasia – A Relook
242	2012	Prevention of Interference with the freedom of Matrimonial Alliances 2012 (in the name of Honour and Tradition ) : A suggested legal framework
243	2012	Section 498 A, IPC

=== Twentieth Law Commission ===
The Twentieth Law Commission of India's chairman were Justice D. K. Jain from January 2013 to October 2013 and Justice A. P. Shah from November 2013 to August 2015. The Terms of Reference of the Twentieth Law Commission were as follows:- A. Review/Repeal of obsolete laws: (i) Identify laws which are no longer needed or relevant and can be immediately repealed. (ii) Identify laws which are not in harmony with the existing climate of economic liberalization and need change. (iii) Identify laws which otherwise require changes or amendments and to make suggestions for their amendment. (iv) Consider in a wider perspective the suggestions for revision/amendment given by Expert Groups in various Ministries/Departments with a view to coordinating and harmonising them. (v) Consider references made to it by Ministries/ Departments in respect of legislation having bearing on the working of more than one Ministry/ Department. (vi) Suggest suitable measures for quick redressal of citizens grievances, in the field of law. B. Law and Poverty (i) Examine the Laws which affect the poor and carry out post-audit for socio-economic legislations. (ii) Take all such measures as may be necessary to harness law and the legal process in the service of the poor. C. Keep under review the system of judicial administration to ensure that it is responsive to the reasonable demands of the times and in particular to secure: (i) elimination of delays, speedy clearance of arrears and reduction in costs so as to secure quick and economical disposal of cases without affecting the cardinal principle that decisions should be just and fair. (ii) simplification of procedure to reduce and eliminate technicalities and devices for delay so that it operates not as an end in itself but as a means of achieving justice. (iii) improvement of standards of all concerned with the administration of justice. D. Examine the existing laws in the light of Directive Principles of State Policy and to suggest ways of improvement and reform and also to suggest such legislations as might be necessary to implement the Directive Principles and to attain the objectives set out in the Preamble to the Constitution. E. Examine the existing laws with a view for promoting gender equality and suggesting amendments thereto. F. Revise the Central Acts of general importance so as to simplify them and to remove anomalies, ambiguities and inequities. G. Recommend to the Government measure for making the statute book up to date by repealing obsolete laws and enactments or parts thereof which have outlived their utility. H. Consider and to convey to the Government its views on any subject relating to law and judicial administration that may be specifically referred to it by the Government through Ministry of Law and Justice (Department of Legal Affairs). I. Consider the requests for providing research to any foreign countries as may be referred to it by the Government through Ministry of Law & Justice (Department of Legal Affairs). J. Examine the impact of globalization on food security, unemployment and recommend measures for the protection of the interests of the marginalized.

Report no.	Presented in	Title of report
244	2014	Electoral Disqualifications
245	2014	Arrears and Backlog: Creating Additional Judicial (wo)manpower
246	2014	Amendments to the Arbitration and Conciliation Act, 1996
247	2014	Sections 41 to 48 of the Indian Succession Act, 1925 – Proposed Reforms
248	2014	Obsolete Laws: Warranting Immediate Repeal (Interim Report)
249	2014	Obsolete Laws: Warranting Immediate Repeal (Second Interim Report)
250	2014	Obsolete Laws: Warranting Immediate Repeal (Third Interim Report)
251	2014	Obsolete Laws: Warranting Immediate Repeal (Fourth Interim Report)
252	2015	Right of the Hindu Wife to Maintenance: A relook at Section 18 of the Hindu Adoptions and Maintenance Act, 1956
253	2015	Commercial Division and Commercial Appellate Division of High Courts and Commercial Courts Bill, 2015
254	2015	The Prevention of Corruption (Amendment) Bill, 2013
255	2015	Electoral Reforms
256	2015	Eliminating Discrimination Against Persons Affected by Leprosy
257	2015	Reforms in Guardianship and Custody Laws in India
258	2015	Prevention of Bribery of Foreign Public Officials and Officials of Public International Organisations – A Study and Proposed Amendments
259	2015	Early Childhood Development and Legal Entitlement
260	2015	Analysis of the 2015 Draft Model Indian Bilateral Investment Treaty
261	2015	Need to Regulate Pet Shops and Dog and Aquarium Fish Breeding
262	2015	The Death Penalty

=== Twenty-First Law Commission ===
In 2015, the Law Ministry had forwarded a list of 48 former judges of high courts and Supreme Court to the Prime Minister's Office to select the next Law Commission chairperson. The term of the 20th Law Commission ended on 30 August last year and the Union Cabinet approved creation of the 21st Law Commission on 9 September. The Law Ministry brought out a notification to create the 21st law panel on 14 September last.

One of the key issues pending before the law panel is a call on amending the Indian Penal Code amid allegations of abuse and arbitrary use of the law. The Law Ministry had urged the commission to study the usage of the provisions of Section 124A (Sedition) of the IPC.

Former Supreme Court judge Balbir Singh Chauhan was appointed chairman of the 21st Law Commission. Justice Ravi R. Tripathi, retired judge of the Gujarat High Court was appointed as Full-time Member.

On 10 June 2016, Satya Pal Jain, Additional Solicitor General of India, was appointed as part-time member of the commission.

Report no.	Presented in	Title of report
263	2016	The Protection of Children (Inter-Country Removal and Retention) Bill
264	2017	The Criminal Law (Amendment) Bill (Provisions dealing with Food Adulteration)
265	2017	Prospects of Exempting Income arising out of Maintenance Money of 'Minor'
266	2017	The Advocates Act, 1961 (Regulation of Legal Profession)
267	2017	Hate Speech
268	2017	Amendments to Criminal Procedure Code, 1973 – Provisions Relating to Bail
269	2017	House-keeping of egg laying hens
270	2017	Compulsory Registration of Marriages
271	2017	Human DNA Profiling
272	2017	Assessment of Statutory Framework of Tribunals in India
273	2017	Implementation of United Nations Convention Against Torture
274	2018	Review of Contempt of Courts Act, 1971
275	2018	Legal Framework: BCCI vis-à-vis Right to Information Act, 2005
276	2018	Legal Framework: Gambling and Sports Betting Including Cricket in India
277	2018	Wrongful Prosecution (Miscarriage of Justice): Legal Remedies

=== Twenty-Second Law Commission ===
The Twenty-Second Law Commission was constituted for a period of three years on 21 February 2020 and its chairperson, Justice Rituraj Awasthi (retd), assumed office on 9 November 2022.

The Commission’s three year term was to end on 20 February 2023, but the Union Cabinet extended its term up to 31 August 2024.

Report no.	Presented in	Title of report
278	2023	Urgent Need to Amend Rule 14(4) of Order VII of the Code of Civil Procedure, 1908
279	2023	Usage of the Law of Sedition
280	2023	The Law on Adverse Possession
281	2023	Compensation for Damage Due to Installation of Towers and Transmission Lines Under The Indian Telegraph Act, 1885 and the Electricity Act, 2003
282	2023	Amendment in Section 154 of The Code of Criminal procedure, 1973 for enabling online Registration of FIR
283	2023	Age of Consent Under The Protection of children From Sexual Offences Act, 2012
284	2024	Revisiting the Law on Prevention of Damage to Public Property
285	2024	The Law on criminal Defamation
286	2024	A Comprehensive Review of the Epidemic Diseases Act, 1897
287	2024	Law on Matrimonial Issues relating to Non-Resident Indians and Overseas Citizens of India
288	2024	
289	2024	Trade Secrets and Economic Espionage

=== Twenty-Third Law Commission ===
The Twenty-Third Law Commission was constituted for a period of three years on 31 August 2024 up to 31 August 2027. Its chairman and members were published in the Gazette on 15 April 2025. Justice (Retd.) Dinesh Maheshwar was appointed as its full-time Chairperson. And Prof. D P Verm and Hitesh Jain as s full-time Members.

== Working of the Law Commission ==
The Law Commission works in close co-ordination and under the general instruction of Ministry of Law and Justice. It generally acts as the initiation point for law reform in the country. Internally, the Law Commission works in a research-oriented manner. Employing a number of research analysts (and even law students from 2007), the commission works upon the assigned agenda and primarily comes up with research based reports, often conclusive and with recommendations. The permanent members of the commission generally are responsible for framing the exact topic and reference to work upon and often takes the services of eminent law experts and jurists who are familiar with the matter under review. These experts may either work part-time with the commission or may have been requested to contribute to specific reports or issues under review.

According to the commission's website, the commission's regular staff consists of about a dozen research personnel of different ranks and varied experiences with a small group of secretarial staff looks after the administration side of the commission's operations and the internal functioning of the commission can be described as a process with the following stages;

- Initiation of projects at the commission's meetings;
- Discussion of priorities; identification of topics and assignment of preparatory work to Members;
- Adoption of methodologies for collection of data and research;
- Outlining of problems and determination of areas for reform;
- Consultations with public, professional bodies and academic institutions;
- Evaluation of responses and preparation of draft of report;
- Discussion and scrutiny of report, leading to its finalization; and
- Forwarding of report to the Ministry of Law and Justice.

Once the report is submitted to the Ministry of Law and Justice, the task of the commission ends unless it is required to rework upon identified areas of provide clarifications by the government on the report submitted. Upon receipt of the report, it is the responsible for follow-up action on the recommendations made by the commission in the report. Generally, the Ministry of Law and Justice forwards the report with its remarks to other relevant ministries in the government and seeks from them their opinion on the relevance of the recommendation and finalizes with them the manner of implementation of these recommendations. When the proposals are cleared by the various ministries and approved by the Cabinet, the Ministry of Law and Justice goes for drafting of the implementing legislation or follows the draft submitted by the Law Commission (which usually is the case) and presents the same for approval before the Parliament.

== Role of Law Commission in legal reform in India ==
The Law Commission of India, though an ad hoc body, has been key to law reform in India. Its role has been both advisory and critical of the government's policies. The Supreme Court of India and academia have recognized the commission as pioneering and prospective. In a number of decisions, the Supreme Court has referred to the work done by the commission and followed its recommendations. The fact that the chairman of the commission is generally a retired judge of the Supreme Court has helped the prominence of the commission.

The Commission reviews judicial administration to ensure that it is responsive so that delays are eliminated, arrears are cleared and disposal of cases is quick and cost-effective without sacrificing the cardinal principle that they are just and fair. The Commission seeks to simplify procedure to curb delays and improve standards of justice. It also strives to promote an accountable and citizen-friendly government which is transparent and ensures the people's right to information.

The recommendations of the commission are not binding on the government. "They are recommendations. They may be accepted or rejected. Action on the said recommendations depends on the ministries/departments, which are concerned with the subject matter of the recommendations." This has resulted in a number of important and critical recommendations not being implemented. The commission, however, has continued to work upon its assigned tasks.

The power vested in the commission to suo motu take up matters for discussion and submit recommendations has also worked well to the advantage of India's legal system. The history of the commission is replete with such recommendations which have been made in the wake of the hour and where the law has needed change. Further, the commission has been often returned to review its earlier reports in the wake of changed scenarios and the aptness of law in such situations. Euthanasia and related issues, in particular, has been one such area where the commission has been relook the situation at least three times, with the latest being its 196th report on the topic.

Besides the Law Ministry, the commission has also been requested to work upon specific issues and submit its views by the Supreme Court on various occasions. The latest in regard has been the 205th report of the commission which has been prepared in view of the Supreme Court's request for assistance in determination of "certain legal issues relating to child marriage, and the different ages at which a person is defined as a child in different laws." The report stirred a public debate in India for recommending inter alia, a reduction in marriage age of boys to be at par with girls at 18, instead of the long continuing 21 and 18 respectively.

With all its past and present works being continuously provided on the internet, the commission has also provided a firm assistance to legal research in the country. The fact that a number of its reports have been taken receptively by the various ministries and have been worked upon to change the legal scenario, is itself a sufficient indicator of the role of the commission in furtherance of law reform in India.

== See also ==
- Autonomous law schools in India
- Common Law Admission Test
- Law Commission
- Law reform
- Legal Education in India
- List of law schools in India
- Ministry of Law and Justice (India)
- Supreme Court of India
- Civil Procedure Code, 1908
- Pendency of court cases in India
