= Legal practice in India =

Legal practice in India is governed by the Advocates Act 1961; an act passed by the Indian Parliament which provides for laws relating to legal practitioners in India and for the constitution of the Bar Council of India (BCI) and state bar councils. Under the powers granted in the act, the BCI has made rules known as BCI Rules 1975 which lay down rules for practice, legal education and professional ethics. The Advocates Act, 1961 replaced the earlier Indian Bar Councils Act, 1926.

== History ==
Before the Advocates Act, 1961, there had existed various professions. The Pleaders, Mukhtars and Revenue Agents Act, 1865 was passed, followed by the Legal Practitioners Act, 1879, the Indian Bar Councils Act, 1926 and the Advocates Act, 1961.

== Bar Council of India Rules ==
The Bar Council of India is a statutory body that regulates and represents the Indian bar. It was created by Parliament under the Advocates Act, 1961. It prescribes standards of professional conduct, etiquette and exercises disciplinary jurisdiction over the bar. It also sets standards for legal education and grants recognition to universities whose degree in law will serve as a qualification for students to enroll themselves as advocates upon graduation.

Bar Council of India has been empowered under section 49 of the Advocates Act to make rules. In exercise of those powers Bar Council of India made rules which were published in the official gazette on 6 September 1975.

- Parts I, II and III deal with establishment of Bar Council of India, state bar councils, lawyers and their roles.
- Part IV deals with rules of legal education being rules on standards of legal education and recognition of degrees in law for the purpose of enrolment as advocate and inspection of Universities for recognizing its degree in law.
- Parts V, VI, VII, VIII and IX deal with other aspects including the professional ethics.

== Lawyers Collective v. Bar Council of India and Others ==
This case arose because of the petition filed against the foreign law firms who had obtained permission from the RBI to set up liaison offices. The ultimate question framed by the Court was whether the ‘practice of law’ included litigious and non-litigious work. The question therefore expanded beyond the scope of permissibility of such law firms practising in India.

Even in the absence of this judgement, there was never any doubt that a foreign law firm cannot carry on any revenue-generating activities in India. By stating that liaison offices of such firms carry on non-litigious practice, the Court does seem to have indulged in a degree of conjecture. This has in turn led to the conclusion that even a liaison office is involved in the same nature of work as an Indian law firm that carries on non-litigious practice, necessitating a discussion on the meaning of the expression ‘practice of law’ as a whole.
