= Professional conduct =

Professional conduct is the field of regulation of members of professional bodies, either acting under statutory or contractual powers.

Historically, professional conduct was wholly undertaken by the private professional bodies, the sole legal authority for which was of a contractual nature. These bodies commonly established codes of conduct and ethical codes for the guidance of their members.

In certain areas, where the public interest is considered to be heavily engaged, legislation has been enacted, either replacing professional regulation by statutory legislation, or by a form of supervision of the professional body by a statutory body.

== European Union ==
The Council of Bars and Law Societies of Europe (CCBE) is the representative organisation of European lawyers through its member bars and law societies from 31 full member countries, and 11 further associate and observer countries. The CCBE has issued a Charter of core principles of the European legal profession and Code of Conduct for European lawyers. Activities include a committee on Deontology and a working group on Professional Indemnity Insurance.

The European Council of Civil Engineers (ECCE) aims to promote the highest technical and ethical standards, to provide a source of impartial advice, and promote co-operation with other pan-European organisations in the construction industry. The ECCE formulates standards for a European Code of Conduct of the Civil Engineering Profession and disciplinary procedures applicable throughout the Union. Other activities include the preparation of a review of the civil engineering profession in Europe, covering, e.g., demand for liability insurance.

The Council of European Geodetic Surveyors (CLGE) represents the interests of the geodetic surveying profession in the private and public sector from 31 countries of Europe. As of September 2009, the CLGE adopted the CLGE Code of Conduct of the European Surveyor and initiated the ratification process amongst members. It 'highly recommends that European surveyors hold professional indemnity insurance'.

== United Kingdom ==
In the United Kingdom, where a professional body is a public body within the meaning of the Human Rights Act 1998 (such as is the case with medicine, the legal profession, and financial services), its professional conduct machinery must conform to the European Convention on Human Rights.

== See also ==
- Licensure
- Outline of consulting
- Professional abuse
- Professional boundaries
- Professional ethics
- Professional responsibility
