= Law reform =

Process of re-examining existing laws

Law reform or legal reform is the process of examining existing laws, and advocating and implementing change in a legal system, usually with the aim of enhancing justice or efficiency.

Intimately related are law reform bodies or law commissions, which are organizations set up to facilitate law reform. Law reform bodies carry out research and recommend ways to simplify and modernize the law. Many law reform bodies are statutory corporations set up by governments, although they are usually independent from government control, providing intellectual independence to accurately reflect and report on how the law should progress.

Law reform activities can include preparation and presentation of cases in court in order to change the common law; lobbying of government officials in order to change legislation; and research or writing that helps to establish an empirical basis for other law reform activities.

The four main methods in reforming law are repeal (get rid of a law), creation of new law, consolidation (change existing law) and codification.

== Definition ==
The expression "law reform" is used in a number of senses and some of these are close to being wholly incompatible with each other.

In the Law Reform Commission Act 1975, Ireland, the expression "reform" includes, in relation to the law or a branch of the law, its development, its codification (including in particular its simplification and modernisation), statute law revision and consolidation of statute law, and kindred words must be construed accordingly.

The legislation establishing the Australian Law Reform Commission (ALRC) outlines its functions as:

"to review Commonwealth laws relevant to those matters for the purposes of systematically developing and reforming the law, particularly by:

(i) bringing the law into line with current conditions and ensuring that it meets current needs; and

(ii) removing defects in the law; and

(iii) simplifying the law; and

(iv) adopting new or more effective methods for administering the law and dispensing justice; and

(v) providing improved access to justice"

It also describes the ALRC's functions as considering the making or consolidating of laws, repeal of obsolete or unnecessary laws, and considering proposals for uniformity and complementarity of laws.

== Correlation with judicial reform ==
Judicial reform is the complete or partial political reform of a country's judiciary. Judicial reform is often done as a part of wider reform of the country's political system or a legal reform. The President of the Constitutional Court of the Russian Federation, Valery Zorkin, gives in his article, "Twelve Theses on Legal Reform in Russia", first published in Russian magazine Legislation and Economics, N. 2, 2004 an explained correlation between legal and judicial reform: "Complete legal reform should normally include not only judicial reform, but also reform of various aspects of the structural system and content of legislation, legal education, legal awareness by the population, and also the corporate consciousness of the whole legal community. Judicial reform usually aims to improve such things as law courts, procuracies, advocacy (bar), inquest, executory processes, and record keeping." .

== Law reform around the world ==
=== In Australia ===
There are a variety of law reform bodies in a range of Australian jurisdictions, including the Australian Law Reform Commission, and Law Reform Commissions in New South Wales, Queensland, and Western Australia. Law reform institutes hosted within universities also exist in South Australia and Tasmania. The Northern Territory has a law reform committee within its Department of Justice, however the Australian Capital Territory discontinued its law reform and sentencing advisory council in 2025. In addition to conventional law reform agencies, a number of other bodies undertake specialised or adjacent reform activities, such as the Independent National Security Legislation Monitor, and various jurisdictions' sentencing advisory bodies.

=== In the United Kingdom ===
In the United Kingdom, law reform is formally the responsibility of the Law Commission (England and Wales), the Scottish Law Commission and the Northern Ireland Law Commission.

=== In Russia ===
In modern Russia, aspects and directions of development of judicial reform were formulated in the Judicial Reform Concept, enacted by the Russian Parliament on October 24, 1991. This document still remains legally valid and applicable.

Valery Zorkin stressed that "the separation of powers principle, also proclaimed in the Constitution of the Russian Federation, requires observance of judicial independence. And such independence requires proper funding of the courts and their activities. It is well known that Russian courts remain under-funded. However, the cumulative economic costs suffered by both state and private enterprises as the result of under-performance by various judicial institutions, especially by the courts of general jurisdiction and the arbitration courts, is at least twice the order of magnitude as the financial burden carried by the state and society in financing such judicial institutions. The elimination of under-funding of the courts would definitely improve the efficiency of their work and be worthwhile.

Taking into account the specifics of historical developments in Russia, one may assert that without undertaking a large-scale legal reform it would be extremely difficult to succeed concurrently with judicial reform. It is necessary now to start unfolding a full-scale legal reform, which has to be completed by the year 2020. The official public presentation and implementation of such legal reform should become the prime responsibility of executive and legislative authorities. The program of legal reform needs to be adopted in the form of a legislative act.

=== In the United States of America ===
In April 2020, the National Center for State Courts and the Institute for the Advancement of the American Legal System issued a three-year report, "Transforming Our Civil Justice System for the 21st Century: The Road to Civil Justice Reform", which surmised that:

Americans deserve a civil legal process that can fairly and promptly resolve disputes for everyone — rich or poor, individuals or businesses, in matters large or small. Yet our civil justice system often fails to meet this standard. Runaway costs, delays, and complexity are undermining public confidence and denying people the justice they seek. This has to change.

— Transforming Our Civil Justice System for the 21st Century: The Road to Civil Justice Reform

=== International cooperation ===
There are also a number of forums and events dedicated to law reform, including the Commonwealth Association of Law Reform Agencies and the Australasian Law Reform Agencies Conference.

== See also ==
- Statute law revision
- Law Reform Act
- Statute Law Revision Act
- Statute Law (Repeals) Act
- Constitutionalism
- Democratization
- Deregulation
- Drug liberalization
- Judiciary
- Judicial independence
- Liberalization
- Land reform
- Prison reform
- Rule of law
- Rule according to higher law
- Security sector governance and reform
