= Salmon and Freshwater Fisheries (Consolidation) (Scotland) Act 2003 =

Act of the Scottish Parliament

Salmon and Freshwater Fisheries (Consolidation) (Scotland) Act 2003 (Note: Section 71(1).)
- Act of Parliament
- Scottish Parliament
- Long title: An Act of the Scottish Parliament to consolidate, with amendments recommended by the Scottish Law Commission, the enactments relating to salmon and freshwater fisheries in Scotland.
- Citation: 2003 asp 15
- Territorial extent: Scotland (Note: The act does not apply to the River Tweed or the Upper Esk: section 71(3) and (4). Section 6 also does not apply to the Lower Esk: section 71(5).)

Dates
- Royal assent: 1 May 2003
- Commencement: 1 May 2003 (section 71); 1 April 2005 (rest of act); (Note: Section 71(2). The Salmon and Freshwater Fisheries (Consolidation) (Scotland) Act 2003 (Commencement) Order 2005 (SSI 2005/174).)
Other legislation
Amends	See § Repealed and revoked enactments
Repeals/revokes	See § Repealed and revoked enactments
Amended by	Water Environment (Consequential and Savings Provisions) (Scotland) Order 2006; Aquaculture and Fisheries (Scotland) Act 2007; Aquatic Animal Health (Scotland) Regulations 2009]]; Aquaculture and Fisheries (Scotland) Act 2013; Natural Environment (Scotland) Act 2026

Status: Amended

Text of statute as originally enacted

Revised text of statute as amended

Text of the Salmon and Freshwater Fisheries (Consolidation) (Scotland) Act 2003 as in force today (including any amendments) within the United Kingdom, from legislation.gov.uk.

The Salmon and Freshwater Fisheries (Consolidation) (Scotland) Act 2003 (2003 asp 15) is an act of the Scottish Parliament that consolidated enactments related to salmon and freshwater fisheries in Scotland, incorporating amendments recommended by the Scottish Law Commission.

== Provisions ==
The act, unusually for Scots law, states that rights can be possessed. A licensing system was introduced for killing wild salmon was introduced under the act in 2015.

=== Repealed and revoked enactments ===
Section 70(2) of the act repealed 15 enactments and revoked 2 instruments, listed in part 2 of schedule 4 to the act, except in so far as they applied to the River Tweed or the Upper Esk.

Citation	Short title	Extent of repeal or revocation
1607 (c. 6)	Theft Act 1607	The words "and fisches in propir stankis and loches".
1804 (c. xlv)	Solway Firth Fisheries Act 1804	The whole act.
1868 (c. 123)	Salmon Fisheries (Scotland) Act 1868	The whole act.
1877 (c. ccxl)	Solway Salmon Fisheries Commissioners (Scotland) Act 1877	The whole act.
1902 (c. 29)	Freshwater Fish (Scotland) Act 1902	The whole act.
1933 (c. 35)	Trout (Scotland) Act 1933	The whole act.
1951 (c. 26)	Salmon and Freshwater Fisheries (Protection) (Scotland) Act 1951	The whole act.
1965 (c. 13)	Rivers (Prevention of Pollution) (Scotland) Act 1965	Section 13(1).
1974 (c. 40)	Control of Pollution Act 1974	In Schedule 3, paragraph 11.
1976 (c. 22)	Freshwater and Salmon Fisheries (Scotland) Act 1976	The whole act.
1976 (c. 86)	Fishery Limits Act 1976	In Schedule 2, paragraph 12.
1981 (c. 29)	Fisheries Act 1981	In Schedule 4, paragraphs 18 to 25.
1986 (c. 62)	Salmon Act 1986	Sections 1 to 3 and 5 to 30.
1986 (c. 62)	Salmon Act 1986	Schedules 1 to 3.
1986 (c. 62)	Salmon Act 1986	In Schedule 4, paragraphs 1 to 5, 7 to 10, 12 and 15.
1995 (c. 40)	Criminal Procedure (Consequential Provisions) (Scotland) Act 1995	In Schedule 4, paragraph 11.
SI 1996/1211	Deregulation (Salmon Fisheries (Scotland) Act 1868) Order 1996	The whole order.
SI 1999/1111	District Salmon Fishery Boards Order 1999	The whole order.
2001 asp 3	Salmon Conservation (Scotland) Act 2001	The whole act.

== Subsequent developments ==
The remaining provisions of the act (other than section 71 on citation, commencement and extent, which came into force on royal assent) came into force on 1 April 2005 by the Salmon and Freshwater Fisheries (Consolidation) (Scotland) Act 2003 (Commencement) Order 2005 (SSI 2005/174).

The act has been amended on several occasions. The Water Environment (Consequential and Savings Provisions) (Scotland) Order 2006 (SSI 2006/181) made amendments consequential upon the Water Environment and Water Services (Scotland) Act 2003. The Aquaculture and Fisheries (Scotland) Act 2007 made further amendments relating to fishing methods and district salmon fishery boards. The Aquatic Animal Health (Scotland) Regulations 2009 (SSI 2009/85) made consequential amendments implementing Council Directive 2006/88/EC on animal health requirements for aquaculture animals. The Aquaculture and Fisheries (Scotland) Act 2013 made substantial further amendments. Outstanding changes under the Natural Environment (Scotland) Act 2026 have not yet been applied to the text of the act.
