= Law commission =

Independent organization set up by a government to reform the law

A law commission, law reform commission, or law revision commission is an independent body set up by a government to conduct law reform; that is, to consider the state of laws in a jurisdiction and make recommendations or proposals for legal changes or restructuring.

The first term is prevalent in the United Kingdom, the second is prevalent in the Commonwealth, and the third one is prevalent in the United States.

== Work ==
The functions of a law commission body include drafting revised versions of confusing laws, preparing consolidated versions of laws, making recommendations on updating outdated laws and making recommendations on repealing obsolete or spent laws. Law commissions often undertake projects focusing on legislation, although their mandates may be narrower or broader.

== List of law commissions ==
- Australia: Australian Law Reform Commission
  - New South Wales: New South Wales Law Reform Commission
  - Victoria: Victorian Law Reform Commission
  - Western Australia: Law Reform Commission of Western Australia
  - Tasmania: Tasmania Law Reform Institute
- Bangladesh: Law Commission of Bangladesh
- Canada: the Law Commission of Canada was established by the Law Commission of Canada Act on July 1, 1997 and was eliminated in 2006. It replaced the Law Reform Commission of Canada, which was created in 1971 and was dissolved in 1993 by the Mulroney government. On September 25, 2006, funding to the Commission was eliminated by the Harper government.
  - Alberta: Alberta Law Reform Institute
  - British Columbia: British Columbia Law Institute, formed to replace the British Columbia Law Reform Commission, which had been disbanded due to lack of funding
  - Manitoba: Manitoba Law Reform Commission
  - Nova Scotia: Law Reform Commission of Nova Scotia
  - Ontario: Law Commission of Ontario
  - Quebec: Institut québécois de réforme du droit et de la justice
  - Saskatchewan: – Law Reform Commission of Saskatchewan
- Republic of Cuba: Advisory Law Commission of Cuba (1906 – 1909), established by the Provisional Government of Cuba to reform Spanish imperial law in Cuba
- Fiji: Fiji Law Reform Commission
- Samoa: Samoa Law Reform Commission, established under the Law Reform Commission Act 2008
- Hong Kong: Law Reform Commission of Hong Kong, established in 1980
- India: Law Commission of India
- Ireland: The Law Reform Commission, established under the Law Reform Commission Act 1975
- Jersey: Jersey Law Commission established by the States of Jersey in 1996
- Mauritius: Law Reform Commission of Mauritius established by the Law Reform Commission Act No. 26 of 2005
- Nepal: Nepal Law Commission established by the Nepal Law Commissions Act 2007
- New Zealand: New Zealand Law Commission established by the Law Commission Act 1985
- Nigeria: Nigerian Law Reform Commission
- South Africa: South African Law Reform Commission
- Uganda: Uganda Law Reform Commission, established by Article 248 of the Ugandan Constitution
- United Kingdom
  - England and Wales: The Law Commission
  - Scotland: the Scottish Law Commission, established by the Law Commissions Act 1965 at the same time as the Law Commission in England and Wales
  - Northern Ireland, the Northern Ireland Law Commission (formerly the Law Reform Advisory Committee) was established in 2007, but has been "non-operational" since 2015.
  - Other bodies concerned with law reform in the United Kingdom included the Law Revision Committee (1934 to 1939) and the Law Reform Committee (1952 - )
- United States: Office of the Law Revision Counsel of the United States House of Representatives
  - California: California Law Revision Commission
  - New York: New York Law Revision Commission
  - New Jersey: New Jersey Law Revision Commission

== See also ==
- Law reform
- Commonwealth Association of Law Reform Agencies
