= Law Reform Advisory Committee =

The Law Reform Advisory Committee was a body that reviewed the civil law in Northern Ireland, with a view to making recommendations for law reform. It was the equivalent in Northern Ireland of the Law Commission in England and Wales or in Scotland. It was replaced by a new statutory body, the Northern Ireland Law Commission, in 2007.

It was established in April 1989 by the Secretary of State for Northern Ireland, Tom King. As of August 2006, the committee had 8 members: Mr Justice Declan Morgan (chairman), Judge Desmond Marrinan (Vice Chairman), and six other members who are legal professionals or legal academics. It was supported by the Office of Law Reform.
