= List of acts of the Parliament of the United Kingdom from 1804 =

This is a complete list of acts of the Parliament of the United Kingdom for the year 1804.

Note that the first parliament of the United Kingdom was held in 1801; parliaments between 1707 and 1800 were either parliaments of Great Britain or of Ireland). For acts passed up until 1707, see the list of acts of the Parliament of England and the list of acts of the Parliament of Scotland. For acts passed from 1707 to 1800, see the list of acts of the Parliament of Great Britain. See also the list of acts of the Parliament of Ireland.

For acts of the devolved parliaments and assemblies in the United Kingdom, see the list of acts of the Scottish Parliament, the list of acts of the Northern Ireland Assembly, and the list of acts and measures of Senedd Cymru; see also the list of acts of the Parliament of Northern Ireland.

The number shown after each act's title is its chapter number. Acts passed before 1963 are cited using this number, preceded by the year(s) of the reign during which the relevant parliamentary session was held; thus the Union with Ireland Act 1800 is cited as "39 & 40 Geo. 3 c. 67", meaning the 67th act passed during the session that started in the 39th year of the reign of George III and which finished in the 40th year of that reign. Note that the modern convention is to use Arabic numerals in citations (thus "41 Geo. 3" rather than "41 Geo. III"). Acts of the last session of the Parliament of Great Britain and the first session of the Parliament of the United Kingdom are both cited as "41 Geo. 3". Acts passed from 1963 onwards are simply cited by calendar year and chapter number.

All modern acts have a short title, e.g. "the Local Government Act 2003". Some earlier acts also have a short title given to them by later acts, such as by the Short Titles Act 1896.

== 44 Geo. 3 ==
Continuing the second session of the 2nd Parliament of the United Kingdom, which met from 22 November 1803 until 31 July 1804.

This session was also traditionally cited as 44 G. 3.

=== Public general acts ===
Short title	Citation	Royal assent
Long title
Mutiny Act 1804 (repealed)	44 Geo. 3. c. 19	9 March 1804
An act for punishing mutiny and desertion; and for the better payment of the army and their quarters. (Repealed by Statute Law Revision Act 1872 (35 & 36 Vict. c. 63))
Marine Mutiny Act 1804 (repealed)	44 Geo. 3. c. 20	9 March 1804
An act for the regulation of his Majesty's royal marine forces while on shore. (Repealed by Statute Law Revision Act 1872 (35 & 36 Vict. c. 63))
Restriction on Cash Payments (Ireland) Act 1804 (repealed)	44 Geo. 3. c. 21	9 March 1804
An act to continue, until three Months after any Restriction imposed by any Act of the present Session of Parliament on the Bank of England from issuing Cash in Payments shall cease, an Act, made in the Parliament of Ireland, in the thirty-seventh Year of the Reign of his present Majesty, (Note: Restriction on Cash Payments (Ireland) Act 1797 (37 Geo. 3. c. 51 (I))) for confirming and continuing the Restrictions on Payments in Cash by the Bank of Ireland, and also an Act made in the forty-third Year of the Reign of his present Majesty (Note: Restriction on Cash Payments (Ireland) Act 1802 (43 Geo. 3. c. 45)) for amending the said Act. (Repealed by Statute Law Revision Act 1872 (35 & 36 Vict. c. 63))
Exportation Act 1804 (repealed)	44 Geo. 3. c. 22	9 March 1804
An act to indemnify all Persons who have been concerned in issuing or carrying into Execution an Order of the Lords Commissioners of his Majesty's Treasury for permitting the Exportation of Seed Corn to Portugal from Great Britain. (Repealed by Statute Law Revision Act 1872 (35 & 36 Vict. c. 63))
Greenland Fishery Act 1804 (repealed)	44 Geo. 3. c. 23	9 March 1804
An act for allowing Vessels employed in the Greenland Whale Fishery, and clearing out from any Port in Great Britain, to complete their full Number of Men at certain Ports for the present Season. (Repealed by Statute Law Revision Act 1872 (35 & 36 Vict. c. 63))
Payment of Creditors (Scotland) Act 1804 (repealed)	44 Geo. 3. c. 24	9 March 1804
An act for further continuing, until the twenty-fifth Day of March One thousand eight hundred and six, an Act made in the thirty-third Year of the Reign of his present Majesty, (Note: Payment of Creditors (Scotland) Act 1793 (33 Geo. 3. c. 74)) for rendering the Payment of Creditors more equal and expeditious in Scotland. (Repealed by Statute Law Revision Act 1872 (35 & 36 Vict. c. 63))
Crown Lands at Byfleet, Weybridge, etc., Surrey Act 1804 (repealed)	44 Geo. 3. c. 25	9 March 1804
An Act to enable His Majesty to grant the Inheritance, in Fee Simple, of certain Manors, Messuages, Lands and Hereditaments, in the Parishes of Byfleet, Weybridge, Walton, Walton Leigh, and Chertsey, in the County of Surrey, to His Royal Highness Frederick Duke of York and Albany, for a valuable Consideration. (Repealed by Statute Law (Repeals) Act 1978 (c. 45))
Customs, Excise and Taxes Act 1804 (repealed)	44 Geo. 3. c. 26	23 March 1804
An act for charging, until the twenty-fifth Day of March One thousand eight hundred and five, certain Rates and Duties, and for allowing certain Bounties and Drawbacks upon Goods, Wares, and Merchandize, imported into and exported from Ireland; and also for charging certain Inland Duties of Excise and Taxes in Ireland in lieu of former Rates, Duties, and Taxes, Bounties and Drawbacks. (Repealed by Statute Law Revision Act 1872 (35 & 36 Vict. c. 63))
Countervailing Duties Act 1804 (repealed)	44 Geo. 3. c. 27	23 March 1804
An act for charging, until the twenty-fifth Day of March One thousand eight hundred and five, certain increased Countervailing Duties on the Importation into Ireland, of the several Goods, Wares, and Merchandize therein mentioned, being the Growth, Produce, or Manufacture of Great Britain; and for allowing increased Drawbacks on the Exportation to Great Britain of the several Articles therein mentioned, being the Manufacture of Ireland. (Repealed by Statute Law Revision Act 1872 (35 & 36 Vict. c. 63))
Duty on Malt (Ireland) Act 1804 (repealed)	44 Geo. 3. c. 28	23 March 1804
An act for granting to his Majesty a Duty upon Malt made in Ireland, for the Year One thousand eight hundred and four. (Repealed by Statute Law Revision Act 1872 (35 & 36 Vict. c. 63))
Importation Act 1804 (repealed)	44 Geo. 3. c. 29	23 March 1804
An act for permitting, until the fifth Day of May One thousand eight hundred and five, the Importation of Hides, Calve Skins, Horns, Tallow, and Wool, (except Cotton Wool,) in Foreign Ships, on Payment of the like Duties as if imported in British or Irish Ships. (Repealed by Statute Law Revision Act 1872 (35 & 36 Vict. c. 63))
Importation (No. 2) Act 1804 (repealed)	44 Geo. 3. c. 30	23 March 1804
An act to revive and continue, until eight Months after the Ratification of a Definitive Treaty of Peace, an Act, made in the forty-second Year of his present Majesty, (Note: Goods in Neutral Ships Act 1802 (42 Geo. 3. c. 80)) for repealing several Acts relating to the Admission of certain Articles of Merchandize in Neutral Ships, and to the issuing Orders in Council for that Purpose, and for making other Provisions in lieu thereof; and also to indemnify all Persons who have been concerned in issuing or carrying into Execution Orders of Council for permitting the Importation of certain Goods from America in Neutral Ships. (Repealed by Statute Law Revision Act 1872 (35 & 36 Vict. c. 63))
Loans or Exchequer Bills Act 1804 (repealed)	44 Geo. 3. c. 31	23 March 1804
An act for raising the further Sum of two Millions by Loans or Exchequer Bills, on the Credit of such Aids or Supplies as have been or shall be granted by Parliament for the Service of Great Britain, for the Year One thousand eight hundred and four. (Repealed by Statute Law Revision Act 1872 (35 & 36 Vict. c. 63))
Militia (Ireland) Act 1804 (repealed)	44 Geo. 3. c. 32	3 May 1804
An act for empowering his Majesty, for a Time and to an Extent therein limited, to accept the Services of such Parts of his Militia Forces in Ireland as may voluntarily offer themselves to be employed in Great Britain. (Repealed by Statute Law Revision Act 1872 (35 & 36 Vict. c. 63))
Militia (Ireland) (No. 2) Act 1804 (repealed)	44 Geo. 3. c. 33	3 May 1804
An act for empowering his Majesty to direct the Augmentation of his Militia Forces in Ireland, to an Extent therein limited. (Repealed by Statute Law Revision Act 1861 (24 & 25 Vict. c. 101))
Militia (Ireland) (No. 3) Act 1804 (repealed)	44 Geo. 3. c. 34	3 May 1804
An act to amend an Act, passed in the last Session of Parliament, (Note: Militia (Ireland) (No. 3) Act 1803 (43 Geo. 3. c. 142)) for making Provision for the Wives and Families of Militia Men of Ireland. (Repealed by Militia (Ireland) (No. 3) Act 1809 (49 Geo. 3. c. 86))
Importation, etc. Act 1804 (repealed)	44 Geo. 3. c. 35	3 May 1804
An act to amend and continue several Laws relating to the allowing the Importation of Rape Seed and other Seeds used for extracting Oil, whenever the Prices of Middling British Rape Seed shall be above a certain Limit; to the allowing the Importation of Seal Skins cured with Foreign Salt free of Duty to the twenty-fourth Day of June One thousand eight hundred and nine, and to the Encouragement of the Greenland Whale Fisheries, to the twenty-fifth Day of December One thousand eight hundred and six; and to continue several Laws relating to the allowing the Use of Salt, Duty free, in the preserving of Fish in Bulk or in Barrels; and to the discontinuing the Bounty payable on White Herrings exported, to the twenty-fifth Day of March One thousand eight hundred and nine; to the permitting Sir William Bishop, George Bishop, and Argles Bishop, to carry on the Manufacture of Maidstone Geneva, to the fifth Day of July One thousand eight hundred and nine; and to the Admission to Entry of Oil and Blubber of Newfoundland, taken by his Majesty's Subjects carrying on the Fishery from and residing in the said Island, to the twenty-fifth Day of December One thousand eight hundred and five. (Repealed by Statute Law Revision Act 1872 (35 & 36 Vict. c. 63))
Bonding of Sugar Act 1804 (repealed)	44 Geo. 3. c. 36	3 May 1804
An act to amend and continue, until the twenty-fifth Day of March One thousand eight hundred and seven, so much of an Act, made in the forty-first Year of his present Majesty, (Note: Taxation (No. 8) Act 1801 (41 Geo. 3. (U.K.) c. 44)) as relates to allowing British Plantation Sugar to be warehoused. (Repealed by Statute Law Revision Act 1872 (35 & 36 Vict. c. 63))
Income Tax Act 1804 (repealed)	44 Geo. 3. c. 37	3 May 1804
An act to repeal so much of an Act, passed in the last Session of Parliament, (Note: Income Tax Act 1803 (43 Geo. 3. c. 122)) for granting to his Majesty a Contribution on Profits arising from Property, Professions, Trades, and Offices, as requires Attornies, Agents, and Factors, to retain and pay the Duties chargeable upon publick Annuities; and to extend the Times for hearing Appeals on Assessments or Surcharges made in pursuance of the said Act. (Repealed by Statute Law Revision Act 1872 (35 & 36 Vict. c. 63))
Quartering of Soldiers Act 1804 (repealed)	44 Geo. 3. c. 38	3 May 1804
An act For increasing the Rates of Subsistence to be paid to Innkeepers and others on quartering Soldiers. (Repealed by Statute Law Revision Act 1872 (35 & 36 Vict. c. 63))
Militia Pay (Great Britain) Act 1804 (repealed)	44 Geo. 3. c. 39	3 May 1804
An act for defraying the Charge of the Pay and Cloathing of the Militia in Great Britain for the Year One thousand eight hundred and four. (Repealed by Statute Law Revision Act 1872 (35 & 36 Vict. c. 63))
Militia Allowances Act 1804 (repealed)	44 Geo. 3. c. 40	3 May 1804
An act to revive and further continue, until the twenty-fifth Day of March One thousand eight hundred and five, and amend so much of an Act, made in the thirty-ninth and fortieth Years of his present Majesty, (Note: Militia Allowances Act 1800 (39 & 40 Geo. 3. c. 44)) as grants certain Allowances to Adjutants and Serjeant Majors of the Militia of England, disembodied under an Act of the same Session of Parliament. (Note: Militia Act 1799 (39 & 40 Geo. 3. c. 1)) (Repealed by Statute Law Revision Act 1872 (35 & 36 Vict. c. 63))
Militia Pay (Ireland) Act 1804 (repealed)	44 Geo. 3. c. 41	3 May 1804
An act for defraying, until the twenty-fifth Day of March One thousand eight hundred and five, the Charge of the Pay and Cloathing of the Militia of Ireland; for holding Courts Martial on Serjeant Majors, Serjeants, Corporals, and Drummers, for Offences committed during the Time such Militia shall not be embodied; and for making Allowances in certain Cases to Subaltern Officers of the said Militia during Peace. (Repealed by Statute Law Revision Act 1872 (35 & 36 Vict. c. 63))
Linen Manufacture (Ireland) Act 1804 (repealed)	44 Geo. 3. c. 42	3 May 1804
An Act to amend an Act, made in the Forty second Year of His present Majesty, (Note: Linen Manufacture (Ireland) Act 1802 (42 Geo. 3. c. 75)) to amend the Laws for the better Regulation of the Linen Manufacture in Ireland. (Repealed by Statute Law Revision Act 1872 (35 & 36 Vict. c. 63))
Clergy Ordination Act 1804	44 Geo. 3. c. 43	3 May 1804
An Act to enforce the due Observance of the Canons and Rubrick respecting the Ages of Persons to be admitted into the sacred Orders of Deacon and Priest.
Newfoundland Trade Act 1804 (repealed)	44 Geo. 3. c. 44	3 May 1804
An act to exempt Vessels in the Newfoundland Trade from the Provisions of an Act, passed in the last Session of Parliament, (Note: Passenger Vessels Act 1803 (43 Geo. 3. c. 56)) for regulating Vessels carrying Passengers from the United Kingdom. (Repealed by Statute Law Revision Act 1861 (24 & 25 Vict. c. 101))
Loans or Exchequer Bills (No. 2) Act 1804 (repealed)	44 Geo. 3. c. 45	3 May 1804
An act for raising the Sum of eight Millions by Loans or Exchequer Bills, for the Service of Great Britain, for the Year One thousand eight hundred and four. (Repealed by Statute Law Revision Act 1872 (35 & 36 Vict. c. 63))
Loans or Exchequer Bills (No. 3) Act 1804 (repealed)	44 Geo. 3. c. 46	3 May 1804
An act for raising the Sum of One million five hundred thousand Pounds, by Loans or Exchequer Bills, for the Service of Great Britain for the Year One thousand eight hundred and four. (Repealed by Statute Law Revision Act 1872 (35 & 36 Vict. c. 63))
National Debt Act 1804 (repealed)	44 Geo. 3. c. 47	16 May 1804
An act for raising the Sum of fourteen millions five hundred thousand Pounds by way of Annuities. (Repealed by Statute Law Revision Act 1870 (33 & 34 Vict. c. 69))
National Debt (No. 2) Act 1804 (repealed)	44 Geo. 3. c. 48	16 May 1804
An act for raising a certain Sum of Money by Way of Annuities or Debentures, for the Service of Ireland. (Repealed by Statute Law Revision Act 1870 (33 & 34 Vict. c. 69))
Excise Act 1804 (repealed)	44 Geo. 3. c. 49	16 May 1804
An act for granting to his Majesty, until twelve Months after the Ratification of a Definitive Treaty of Peace, additional Duties of Excise on Wine imported into Great Britain. (Repealed by Statute Law Revision Act 1861 (24 & 25 Vict. c. 101))
Militia Act 1804 (repealed)	44 Geo. 3. c. 50	16 May 1804
An act to revive and continue, until the Ratification of a Definitive Treaty of Peace, an Act, made in the last Session of Parliament, (Note: Militia (Great Britain) Act 1803 (43 Geo. 3. c. 38)) for providing for the more speedy Completion of the Establishment of Officers in the Militia of Great Britain; and for facilitating the filling up Vacancies therein. (Repealed by Statute Law Revision Act 1872 (35 & 36 Vict. c. 63))
Militia (No. 2) Act 1804 (repealed)	44 Geo. 3. c. 51	16 May 1804
An act for making Allowances in certain Cases to Subaltern Officers of the Militia in Great Britain, while disembodied. (Repealed by Statute Law Revision Act 1872 (35 & 36 Vict. c. 63))
Statute Duty Act 1804 (repealed)	44 Geo. 3. c. 52	16 May 1804
An act to alter and amend so much of an Act, passed in the thirty-fourth Year of his present Majesty, (Note: Highways Act 1794 (34 Geo. 3. c. 74)) as relates to the Amount of the Sums to be paid by Persons compounding for the Performance of Statute Duty. (Repealed by Highway Act 1835 (5 & 6 Will. 4. c. 50))
Customs Act 1804 (repealed)	44 Geo. 3. c. 53	18 May 1804
An act for granting to his Majesty, during the present War, and for six Months after the Expiration thereof by the Ratification of a Definitive Treaty of Peace, additional Duties on the Importation of certain Goods, Wares, and Merchandize, into Great Britain; and on Goods, Wares, and Merchandize, brought or carried Coastwise, within Great Britain. (Repealed by Statute Law Revision Act 1872 (35 & 36 Vict. c. 63))
Yeomanry Act 1804 or the Volunteer Consolidation Act 1804 or the Yeomanry and Volunteers Consolidation Act 1804 (repealed)	44 Geo. 3. c. 54	5 June 1804
An act to consolidate and amend the Provisions of the several Acts relating to Corps of Yeomanry and Volunteers in Great Britain; and to make further Regulations relating thereto. (Repealed by Territorial Army and Militia Act 1921 (11 & 12 Geo. 5. c. 37))
Excisable Liquors (Scotland) Act 1804 (repealed)	44 Geo. 3. c. 55	5 June 1804
An act for more effectually preventing the Sale of Exciseable Liquors in Scotland by Persons not duly licensed; and for altering the Times of granting Licences to sell such Exciseable Liquors by Retail. (Repealed by Statute Law Revision Act 1872 (35 & 36 Vict. c. 63))
Defence of the Realm, etc. Act 1804 or the Additional Force Act 1804 (repealed)	44 Geo. 3. c. 56	29 June 1804
An act for establishing and maintaining a permanent additional Force for the Defence of the Realm, and to provide for augmenting his Majesty's Regular Forces; and for the gradual Reduction of the Militia of England. (Repealed by Defence of the Realm Act 1806 (46 Geo. 3. c. 51))
Export Duty Act 1804 (repealed)	44 Geo. 3. c. 57	29 June 1804
An act to exempt from Duties on Export all Linens of the Manufacture of the United Kingdom. (Repealed by Customs Law Repeal Act 1825 (6 Geo. 4. c. 105))
Public Accounts Act 1804 (repealed)	44 Geo. 3. c. 58	29 June 1804
An act for directing certain Publick Accounts of Ireland to be laid annually before Parliament. (Repealed by Statute Law Revision Act 1861 (24 & 25 Vict. c. 101))
Certificates of Attorneys, etc. Act 1804 (repealed)	44 Geo. 3. c. 59	29 June 1804
An act to indemnify Solicitors, Attornies, and others, who have neglected to enter Certificates within the Time limited by an Act made in the thirty-seventh Year of his present Majesty; (Note: Stamps (No. 2) Act 1797 (37 Geo. 3. c. 90)) and to amend so much of the said Act as relates to the entering such Certificates. (Repealed by Statute Law Revision Act 1872 (35 & 36 Vict. c. 63))
Parliamentary Elections, Aylesbury Act 1804 (repealed)	44 Geo. 3. c. 60	29 June 1804
An act for the preventing of Bribery and Corruption in the Election of Members to serve in Parliament for the Borough of Aylesbury in the County of Buckingham. (Repealed by Ballot Act 1872 (35 & 36 Vict. c. 33))
Sessions Houses, Westminster, etc. Act 1804	44 Geo. 3. c. 61	29 June 1804
An act to amend two Acts, made in the eighteenth (Note: Westminster (Improvement) Act 1778 (18 Geo. 3. c. 72)) and thirty-ninth (Note: Westminster Court House Act 1799 (39 Geo. 3. c. lxxxii)) Years of his present Majesty, for the erecting a Court House for the holding of Sessions of the Peace in the City of Westminster; and for purchasing certain Buildings and Ground between Saint Margaret Street, Union Street, and King Street, in the said City, for the Use of the Publick.
Caledonian Canal Act 1804	44 Geo. 3. c. 62	29 June 1804
An act for making further Provision for making and maintaining an Inland Navigation, commonly called The Caledonian Canal, from the Eastern to the Western Sea by Inverness and Fort William, in Scotland.
Archbishop's Palace, Dublin Act 1804	44 Geo. 3. c. 63	29 June 1804
An Act for vesting the capital Messuage, with the Appurtenances, situate in Kevin Street, in the City of Dublin, called The Palace of the Archbishop of Dublin at Saint Sepulchre's, in his Majesty, his Heirs and Successors; and for applying the Purchase Money, together with another Sum therein mentioned, in Manner and for the Purposes therein mentioned.
Woollen Manufacture Act 1804 (repealed)	44 Geo. 3. c. 64	30 June 1804
An act to continue, until the first Day of July One thousand eight hundred and five, the Operation of an Act passed in the last Session of Parliament, (Note: Woollen Manufacture Act 1803 (43 Geo. 3. c. 136)) to suspend Proceedings in Actions, Prosecutions, and Proceedings under certain Acts relating to the Woollen Manufacture, and also under an Act of the Reign of Queen Elizabeth, (Note: Statute of Artificers 1562 (5 Eliz. 1. c. 4)) so far as the same relates to certain Persons employed or concerned in the said Manufacture. (Repealed by Statute Law Revision Act 1872 (35 & 36 Vict. c. 63))
Exportation and Importation Act 1804 (repealed)	44 Geo. 3. c. 65	3 July 1804
An act to continue, until the first Day of July One thousand eight hundred and five, an Act passed in the last Session of Parliament, (Note: Trade Between Great Britain and Ireland Act 1803 (43 Geo. 3. c. 78)) for continuing two Acts, the one passed in the forty-second Year of his present Majesty, (Note: Trade in Grain, etc. Act 1802 (42 Geo. 3. c. 35)) for regulating the Prices at which Grain, Meal, and Flour, may be exported from Great Britain to Ireland, and from Ireland to Great Britain; and the other, made in the last Session of Parliament, (Note: Trade Between Great Britain and Ireland Act 1802 (43 Geo. 3. c. 14)) for permitting the Exportation of Seed Corn from Great Britain to Ireland, and the Importation of Malt into Great Britain from Ireland. (Repealed by Statute Law Revision Act 1872 (35 & 36 Vict. c. 63))
Defence of the Realm, etc. (No. 2) Act 1804 or the Additional Force (Scotland) Act 1804 (repealed)	44 Geo. 3. c. 66	10 July 1804
An act for establishing and maintaining a permanent additional Force for the Defence of the Realm, and to provide for augmenting his Majesty's Regular Forces, and for the gradual Reduction of the Militia of Scotland. (Repealed by Defence of the Realm Act 1806 (46 Geo. 3. c. 51))
Customs and Excise Act 1804 (repealed)	44 Geo. 3. c. 67	10 July 1804
An act for granting to his Majesty, until the twenty fifth Day of March One thousand eight hundred and five, certain Duties on the Importation of the Goods, Wares, and Merchandize herein mentioned, into Ireland, and also certain Duties of Excise on Spirits, Malt, and Tobacco, in Ireland; and for the Increase of certain publick Revenues in Ireland, by making the same payable in British Currency. (Repealed by Statute Law Revision Act 1872 (35 & 36 Vict. c. 63))
Stamps (Ireland) Act 1804 (repealed)	44 Geo. 3. c. 68	10 July 1804
An act for granting to his Majesty certain Stamp Duties in Ireland. (Repealed by Stamps (Ireland) Act 1806 (46 Geo. 3. c. 64))
Linen Manufacture (Ireland) (No. 2) Act 1804 (repealed)	44 Geo. 3. c. 69	10 July 1804
An act to amend the Laws for regulating the Linen Manufacture of Ireland. (Repealed by Linen Manufacturers (Ireland) Act 1825 (6 Geo. 4. c. 122))
Exportation (No. 2) Act 1804 (repealed)	44 Geo. 3. c. 70	10 July 1804
An act to enable his Majesty to authorize the Exportation of the Machine necessary for erecting a Mint in the Dominions of the King of Denmark. (Repealed by Statute Law Revision Act 1872 (35 & 36 Vict. c. 63))
Counterfeit Dollars and Tokens Act 1804 (repealed)	44 Geo. 3. c. 71	10 July 1804
An act to prevent the Counterfeiting of Silver Coin issued by the Governor and Company of the Bank of England, called Dollars, and Silver Coin which may be issued by the Governor and Company of the Bank of Ireland called Tokens; and to prevent the bringing into the United Kingdom, or uttering, any Counterfeit Dollars or Tokens. (Repealed by Statute Law Revision Act 1861 (24 & 25 Vict. c. 101))
East India Prize Goods Act 1804 (repealed)	44 Geo. 3. c. 72	10 July 1804
An act for allowing the Sale of certain East India Prize Goods in the Port of Liverpool. (Repealed by Statute Law Revision Act 1872 (35 & 36 Vict. c. 63))
Exchequer Bills Act 1804 (repealed)	44 Geo. 3. c. 73	10 July 1804
An act to enable the Lords Commissioners of his Majesty's Treasury of Great Britain to issue Exchequer Bills on the Credit of such Aids or Supplies as have been or shall be granted by Parliament for the Service of Great Britain for the Year One thousand eight hundred and four. (Repealed by Statute Law Revision Act 1872 (35 & 36 Vict. c. 63))
Defence of the Realm, etc. (Ireland) Act 1804 or the Additional Force (Ireland) Act 1804 (repealed)	44 Geo. 3. c. 74	14 July 1804
An act for establishing and maintaining a permanent additional Force to be raised in Ireland, for the Defence of the Realm, and to provide for augmenting his Majesty's Regular Forces. (Repealed by Defence of the Realm (Ireland) Act 1806 (46 Geo. 3. c. 63))
Enlistment of Foreigners Act 1804 (repealed)	44 Geo. 3. c. 75	14 July 1804
An act for enabling Subjects of Foreign States to enlist as Soldiers in his Majesty's Service, and for enabling his Majesty to grant Commissions to Subjects of Foreign States to serve as Officers or as Engineers, under certain Restrictions; and to indemnify all Persons who may have advised his Majesty to enlist any such Soldiers, or grant any such Commissions as aforesaid. (Repealed by Statute Law Revision Act 1872 (35 & 36 Vict. c. 63))
Annuity to Family of Lord Kilwarden Act 1804 (repealed)	44 Geo. 3. c. 76	14 July 1804
An act for settling and securing a certain Annuity on the Viscountess Kilwarden, and on the Family of the late Arthur Lord Viscount Kilwarden. (Repealed by Statute Law Revision Act 1872 (35 & 36 Vict. c. 63))
Marriages Confirmation Act 1804 (repealed)	44 Geo. 3. c. 77	14 July 1804
An act to render valid certain Marriages solemnized in certain Churches and publick Chapels in which Banns had not usually been published before or at the Time of passing an Act, made in the twenty-sixth Year of the Reign of his late Majesty King George the Second, intituled, "An act for the better preventing of clandestine Marriages." (Note: Clandestine Marriages Act 1753 (26 Geo. 2. c. 33)) (Repealed by Statute Law (Repeals) Act 1977 (c. 18))
Weedon Barracks Act 1804	44 Geo. 3. c. 78	14 July 1804
An act for making Compensation to the Proprietors of certain Lands and Hereditaments, situate at Weedon Beck in the County of Northampton, purchased in pursuance of an Act, made in the forty-third Year of his present Majesty, (Note: Land for Ordnance Services (No. 2) Act 1803 (43 Geo. 3. c. 66)) for erecting Buildings thereon for the Service of his Majesty's Ordnance.
Docks and Ordnance Service Act 1804	44 Geo. 3. c. 79	14 July 1804
An act to vest certain Messuages, Lands, Tenements, and Hereditaments in Trustees for better securing his Majesty's Docks, Ships, and Stores, at Chatham, and for the Use of his Majesty's Ordnance at Warley Common and Woolwich.
Civil List Act 1804 (repealed)	44 Geo. 3. c. 80	20 July 1804
An act for the better Support of his Majesty's Household, and of the Honour and Dignity of the Crown of the United Kingdom; and for preventing Accumulation of Arrears in the Payments out of the Civil List Revenues. (Repealed by Statute Law Revision Act 1872 (35 & 36 Vict. c. 63))
Loans or Exchequer Bills (No. 4) Act 1804 (repealed)	44 Geo. 3. c. 81	20 July 1804
An act for enabling his Majesty to raise the Sum of two Millions five hundred thousand Pounds for the Use and Purposes therein mentioned. (Repealed by Statute Law Revision Act 1872 (35 & 36 Vict. c. 63))
Accountant General in Chancery Act 1804 (repealed)	44 Geo. 3. c. 82	20 July 1804
An act to obviate certain Inconveniencies which have been experienced in the Accountant General's Office in the Court of Chancery, in the Execution of an Act made in the last Session of Parliament, for granting a Contribution on the Profits arising from Property, Professions, Trades, and Offices. (Repealed by Statute Law Revision Act 1872 (35 & 36 Vict. c. 63))
Income Tax (No. 2) Act 1804 (repealed)	44 Geo. 3. c. 83	20 July 1804
An act for regulating the Appointment of Commissioners to act in the Execution of an Act of the last Session of Parliament, for granting to his Majesty a Contribution on the Profits arising from Property, Professions, Trades, and Offices. (Repealed by Statute Law Revision Act 1872 (35 & 36 Vict. c. 63))
Postage Act 1804 (repealed)	44 Geo. 3. c. 84	20 July 1804
An act to permit certain Persons in the Office of Ordnance, and the Quarter Master General, to send and receive Letters free from the Duty of Postage; and to enable the Board of Ordnance, the Adjutant General, the Quarter Master General, and the Barrack Master General, to authorize Persons in their Offices to send Letters free from the said Duty. (Repealed by Post Office (Repeal of Laws) Act 1837 (7 Will. 4 & 1 Vict. c. 32))
Import Duty Act 1804 (repealed)	44 Geo. 3. c. 85	20 July 1804
An act for further continuing, for seven Years, and from thence to the End of the then next Session of Parliament, an Act, made in the twelfth Year of his present Majesty, (Note: Customs (No. 1) Act 1772 (12 Geo. 3. c. 50)) for encouraging the Manufacture of Leather by lowering the Duty payable upon the Importation of Oak Bark, when the Price of such Bark shall exceed a certain Rate. (Repealed by Statute Law Revision Act 1872 (35 & 36 Vict. c. 63))
British Fisheries Act 1804 (repealed)	44 Geo. 3. c. 86	20 July 1804
An act for reviving, amending, and further continuing several Laws relating to the more effectual Encouragement of the British Fisheries, until the fifth Day of April One thousand eight hundred and six; and to the Encouragement of the Trade and Manufactures of the Isle of Man, to the improving the Revenue thereof, and the more effectual Prevention of Smuggling to and from the said Island, until the fifth Day of July One thousand eight hundred and five. (Repealed by Sea Fisheries Act 1868 (31 & 32 Vict. c. 45))
Masters and Workmen Act 1804 (repealed)	44 Geo. 3. c. 87	20 July 1804
An act to amend an Act, passed in the thirty-ninth and fortieth Years of his present Majesty, intituled, "An act for settling Disputes that may arise between Masters and Workmen engaged in the Cotton Manufacture in that Part of Great Britain called England." (Note: Disputes Between Masters and Workmen Act 1800 (39 & 40 Geo. 3. c. 90)) (Repealed by Masters and Workmen Arbitration Act 1824 (5 Geo. 4. c. 96))
Hackney Coaches Act 1804 (repealed)	44 Geo. 3. c. 88	20 July 1804
An act for explaining and amending several Acts relating to Hackney Coaches employed as Stage Coaches, and for indemnifying the Owners of Hackney Coaches who have omitted to take out Licences, pursuant to an Act made in the twenty-fifth Year of his present Majesty. (Repealed by London Hackney Carriage Act 1831 (1 & 2 Will. 4. c. 22))
Importation, etc. (No. 2) Act 1804 (repealed)	44 Geo. 3. c. 89	20 July 1804
An act for confirming the Provisions of an Act, made in Ireland in the thirty-second Year of his present Majesty, (Note: Corn Trade Act 1792 (32 Geo. 3. c. 20 (I))) so far as the same prohibits the Import of Malt into Ireland; and for repealing the Power given to the Lord Lieutenant and Council of Ireland, by an Act of this present Session of Parliament, (Note: Distillation of Spirits Act 1803 (44 Geo. 3. c. 11)) prohibiting the Use of Oats and Oatmeal in the Distillation of Spirits in Ireland. (Repealed by Statute Law Revision Act 1872 (35 & 36 Vict. c. 63))
Peace Preservation (Ireland) Act 1804 (repealed)	44 Geo. 3. c. 90	20 July 1804
An act to continue, until seven Years after the passing thereof and from thence to the End of the next Session of Parliament, an Act, made in the Parliament of Ireland in the twenty-seventh Year of his present Majesty, intituled, "An act for the better Execution of the Law and Preservation of the Peace within Counties at large." (Note: Peace Preservation Act 1787 (27 Geo. 3. c. 40 (I))) (Repealed by Statute Law Revision Act 1872 (35 & 36 Vict. c. 63))
Promissory Notes (Ireland) Act 1804 (repealed)	44 Geo. 3. c. 91	20 July 1804
An act to permit the Issue and Negociation of certain Promissory Notes, under a limited Sum, by registered Bankers in Ireland; and to restrain the Issue and Negociation of certain other Notes. (Repealed by Promissory Notes, etc. (Ireland) Act 1805 (45 Geo. 3. c. 41))
Apprehension of Offenders Act 1804 (repealed)	44 Geo. 3. c. 92	20 July 1804
An act to render more easy the apprehending, and bringing to Trial, Offenders escaping from one Part of the United Kingdom to the other, and also from one County to another. (Repealed by Statute Law Revision Act 1872 (35 & 36 Vict. c. 63))
Lotteries Act 1804 (repealed)	44 Geo. 3. c. 93	20 July 1804
An act for granting to His Majesty a Sum of Money, to be raised by Lotteries. (Repealed by Statute Law Revision Act 1872 (35 & 36 Vict. c. 63))
Yeomanry (Accounts) Act 1804 (repealed)	44 Geo. 3. c. 94	28 July 1804
An act to explain an Act of the present Session of Parliament, (Note: Yeomanry Act 1804 (44 Geo. 3. c. 54)) for consolidating and amending the Provisions of the several Acts relating to Corps of Yeomanry and Volunteers in Great Britain, so far as respects the accounting for Monies received by Volunteer Officers. (Repealed by Territorial Army and Militia Act 1921 (11 & 12 Geo. 5. c. 37))
Defence of the Realm Act 1804 (repealed)	44 Geo. 3. c. 95	28 July 1804
An act to amend certain of the Provisions of an Act, made in the forty-third Year of his present Majesty, (Note: Defence of the Realm Act 1803 (43 Geo. 3. c. 55)) to enable his Majesty to provide for the Defence and Security of the Realm, which respect the Purchase of Lands and Hereditaments for the publick Service. (Repealed by Defence Act 1842 (5 & 6 Vict. c. 94))
Defence of the Realm, London Act 1804 or the Additional Force (London) Act 1804 (repealed)	44 Geo. 3. c. 96	28 July 1804
An act to alter, amend, and render more effectual, an Act, passed in the present Session of Parliament, intituled, "An act for establishing and maintaining a permanent additional Force for the Defence of the Realm, and to provide for augmenting his Majesty's Regular Forces; and for the gradual Reduction of the Militia of England;" (Note: Defence of the Realm, etc. Act 1804 (44 Geo. 3. c. 56)) so far as the same relates to the City of London. (Repealed by Defence of the Realm, London Act 1806 (46 Geo. 3. c. 144))
Treasury Bills (Ireland) Act 1804 (repealed)	44 Geo. 3. c. 97	28 July 1804
An act for raising the Sum of eight hundred thousand Pounds Irish Currency, by Treasury Bills, for the Service of Ireland, for the Year One thousand eight hundred and four. (Repealed by Statute Law Revision Act 1872 (35 & 36 Vict. c. 63))
Stamp Act 1804 (repealed)	44 Geo. 3. c. 98	28 July 1804
An Act to repeal the several Duties under the Commissioners for managing the Duties upon stamped Vellum, Parchment, and Paper, in Great Britain and to grant new and additional Duties in lieu thereof. (Repealed by Pharmacy and Medicines Act 1941 (4 & 5 Geo. 6. c. 42))
National Debt (No. 3) Act 1804 (repealed)	44 Geo. 3. c. 99	28 July 1804
An act for granting additional Annuities to the Proprietors of Stock created by two Acts, passed in the thirty-seventh (Note: National Debt (No. 5) Act 1796 (37 Geo. 3. c. 10)) and forty-second (Note: National Debt Act 1801 (42 Geo. 3. c. 8)) Years of his present Majesty. (Repealed by Statute Law Revision Act 1870 (33 & 34 Vict. c. 69))
London Docks (Warehousing of Goods) Act 1804 (repealed)	44 Geo. 3. c. 100	28 July 1804
An act for warehousing Goods within the Limits of certain Docks made under an Act, passed in the thirty-ninth and fortieth Year of his present Majesty, intituled, "An act for making Wet Docks, Basons, Cuts, and other Works for the greater Accommodation and Security of Shipping, Commerce, and Revenue within the Port of London;" (Note: Port of London Improvement Act 1800 (39 & 40 Geo. 3. c. xlvii)) and to make Regulations relating to the said Docks. (Repealed by London Docks Act 1828 (9 Geo. 4. c. cxvi))
Exportation (No. 3) Act 1804 (repealed)	44 Geo. 3. c. 101	28 July 1804
An act for permitting, until the first Day of August One thousand eight hundred and seven, the Exportation of Salt from the Port of Nassau in the Island of New Providence, (Note: Nassau, Bahamas.) the Port of Exuma, (Note: Exuma, Bahamas.) and the Port of Crooked Island, (Note: Crooked Island, Bahamas.) in the Bahama Islands, in Ships belonging to the Inhabitants of the United States of America, and coming in Ballast. (Repealed by Trade Act 1822 (3 Geo. 4. c. 44))
Habeas Corpus Act 1804	44 Geo. 3. c. 102	28 July 1804
An Act for the more effectual Administration of Justice in England and Ireland by the issuing of Writs of Habeas Corpus ad testificandum, in certain Cases.
Customs and Excise (Ireland) Act 1804 (repealed)	44 Geo. 3. c. 103	28 July 1804
An act for making further Regulations for the better Collection and Security of his Majesty's Revenue of Customs and Excise in Ireland, and for preventing Frauds therein. (Repealed by Statute Law Revision Act 1872 (35 & 36 Vict. c. 63))
Bonding of Spirits (Ireland) Act 1804 (repealed)	44 Geo. 3. c. 104	28 July 1804
An act to permit, until the twenty-fifth Day of March One thousand eight hundred and five, the warehousing of Spirits in Ireland for Exportation; for charging a Duty on the same when taken out for Home Consumption; and to regulate the Exportation to Great Britain of such Spirits as shall not be warehoused. (Repealed by Statute Law Revision Act 1872 (35 & 36 Vict. c. 63))
Collection of Revenue (Ireland) Act 1804 (repealed)	44 Geo. 3. c. 105	28 July 1804
An act to continue, until the twenty-ninth Day of September One thousand eight hundred and five, several Acts for the better Collection and Security of his Majesty's Revenue in Ireland; and for preventing Frauds therein. (Repealed by Statute Law Revision Act 1872 (35 & 36 Vict. c. 63))
Inquiry into Public Offices (Ireland) Act 1804 (repealed)	44 Geo. 3. c. 106	28 July 1804
An act for appointing, until the first Day of August One thousand eight hundred and five, Commissioners to inquire into the Fees, Gratuities, Perquisites, and Emoluments, which are or have been lately received in the several publick Offices in Ireland therein mentioned; to examine into any Abuses which may exist in the same; and into the present Mode of receiving, collecting, issuing, and accounting for publick Money in Ireland. (Repealed by Statute Law Revision Act 1872 (35 & 36 Vict. c. 63))
Purchase for Ordnance Service Act 1804	44 Geo. 3. c. 107	28 July 1804
An act for making Compensation to the Proprietors of certain Lands and Hereditaments, situate at Woolwich and Charlton in the County of Kent, purchased in pursuance of three several Acts of Parliament, made in the forty-second (Note: Lands for Ordnance Services, Woolwich Act 1802 (42 Geo. 3. c. 89)) and forty-third (Note: Lands for Ordnance Services, Woolwich Act 1803 (43 Geo. 3. c. 35)) (Note: Land for Ordnance Services Act 1803 (43 Geo. 3. c. 65)) Years of the Reign of his present Majesty, for promoting the Service of his Majesty's Ordnance.
Insolvent Debtors Relief Act 1804 (repealed)	44 Geo. 3. c. 108	30 July 1804
An act for the Relief of certain Insolvent Debtors. (Repealed by Statute Law Revision Act 1872 (35 & 36 Vict. c. 63))
Importation and Exportation Act 1804 (repealed)	44 Geo. 3. c. 109	30 July 1804
An act to regulate the Importation and Exportation of Corn, and the Bounties and Duties payable thereon. (Repealed by Importation and Exportation Act 1821 (1 & 2 Geo. 4. c. 87))
Appropriation Act 1804 (repealed)	44 Geo. 3. c. 110	31 July 1804
An act for granting to his Majesty a certain Sum of Money out of the Consolidated Fund of Great Britain, and for applying a certain Sum of Money therein mentioned for the Service of Great Britain, for the Year One thousand eight hundred and four; and for further appropriating the Supplies granted in this Session of Parliament. (Repealed by Statute Law Revision Act 1872 (35 & 36 Vict. c. 63))

=== Local acts ===
Short title	Citation	Royal assent
Long title
Road from Canterbury to Whitstable Act 1804 (repealed)	44 Geo. 3. c. i	9 March 1804
An Act for keeping in Repair the Roads leading from Saint Dunstan's Cross to North Lane, near to the City of Canterbury, and to the Seaside at Whitstable, in the County of Kent. (Repealed by Road from St. Dunstan's Cross, Canterbury to Whitstable Act 1824 (5 Geo. 4. c. lxxxviii))
Port of London Improvement Act 1804 (repealed)	44 Geo. 3. c. ii	9 March 1804
An Act for raising a further fum of money for carrying into execution an act, passed in the fortieth year of the reign of his present Majesty, (Note: Port of London Improvement Act 1800 (39 & 40 Geo. 3. c. xlvii)) for making wet docks, basons, cuts, and other works, for the greater accommodation and security of shipping, commerce, and revenue, within the port of London. (Repealed by London Docks Act 1828 (9 Geo. 4. c. cxvi))
Road to Smalley Common (Derbyshire) Act 1804 (repealed)	44 Geo. 3. c. iii	9 March 1804
An Act for continuing the term and altering and enlarging the powers of two acts, passed in the fourth (Note: Nottinghamshire and Derby Roads Act 1764 (4 Geo. 3. c. 83)) and twenty-fourth (Note: Nottinghamshire and Derby Roads Act 1783 (24 Geo. 3. Sess. 1. c. 24)) years of the reign of his present majesty King George the Third, for repairing and widening the road from Bramcote Odd House, in the county of Nottingham, to the cross post upon Smalley Common, in the county of Derby; and other roads therein mentioned. (Repealed by Roads from Smalley Common and from Ilkeston (Derbyshire, Nottinghamshire) Act 1825 (6 Geo. 4. c. xv))
Road from Trent Bridge to Cotes Bridge Act 1804 (repealed)	44 Geo. 3. c. iv	9 March 1804
An Act to continue and amend an act, passed in the twentieth year of the reign of his present Majesty, (Note: Trent Bridge to Cotes Bridge Road Act 1780 (20 Geo. 3. c. 87)) for repairing the road from the Trent Bridge, (Note: Trent Bridge in Nottingham. 52°56′18″N 1°08′11″W) in the county of the town of Nottingham to Cotes Bridge, (Note: Cotes Bridge takes the A60 across the River Soar near Cotes in Leicestershire. 52°46′49″N 1°10′49″W) in the county of Leicester. (Repealed by Road from Trent Bridge to Cotes Bridge Act 1824 (5 Geo. 4. c. xlvi))
Southampton and Salisbury Roads Act 1804 (repealed)	44 Geo. 3. c. v	9 March 1804
An Act for continuing the term, and enlarging the powers, of two acts, passed in the second (Note: Southampton and Wilts Road Act 1762 (2 Geo. 3. c. 39)) and fifth (Note: Southampton Roads Act 1765 (5 Geo. 3. c. 66)) years of the reign of his present Majesty, for repairing the road from Mullen's Pond, in the county of Southampton, to the eighteen mile stone from the city of Salisbury, and several other roads in the said acts mentioned. (Repealed by Mullen's Pond (Southampton) and Salisbury Road and Branches Act 1825 (6 Geo. 4. c. xcv))
Boydell's Lottery Act 1804 (repealed)	44 Geo. 3. c. vi	23 March 1804
An Act to enable John Boydell esquire, one of the aldermen of the city of London, and Josiah Boydell, his nephew and partner, to dispose of their collection of paintings, drawings, and engravings, together with their leasehold premises in Pall Mall, called The Shakspeare Gallery, by way way of chance. (Repealed by Statute Law (Repeals) Act 2013 (c. 2))
West India Docks Act 1804 (repealed)	44 Geo. 3. c. vii	23 March 1804
An Act for raising a further sum of money for carrying into execution an act, passed in the thirty-ninth year of the reign of his present Majesty, intituled, "An act for rendering more commodious, and for better regulating the port of London;" (Note: Port of London Improvement and City Canal Act 1799 (39 Geo. 3. c. lxix)) and another act passed in the forty-second year of the said reign, (Note: Port of London Improvement and City Canal Act 1802 (42 Geo. 3. c. xlix)) to alter and amend the first mentioned act. (Repealed by West India Docks Act 1831 (1 & 2 Will. 4. c.lii))
St. Albans Improvement Act 1804 (repealed)	44 Geo. 3. c. viii	23 March 1804
An Act for paving the footways and crosspaths, and for cleansing, lighting, watching, and regulating the streets and other publick passages and places, within the borough of St. Alban, in the county of Hertford. (Repealed by Local Government Board's Provisional Orders Confirmation Act 1875 (No. 1) (38 & 39 Vict. c. x))
Rochdale Canal Act 1804	44 Geo. 3. c. ix	23 March 1804
An Act for enabling the company of proprietors of the Rochdale Canal more effectually to provide for the discharge of their debts, and to complete the whole of the works to be executed by them, in pursuance of the several acts passed for making and maintaining the said canal.
Ashbourne and Leek, and Rushton Common and Congleton Roads Act 1804 (repealed)	44 Geo. 3. c. x	23 March 1804
An Act for continuing the term, and enlarging and altering the powers, of two acts, made in the second (Note: Stafford, Chester and Derby Roads Act 1762 (2 Geo. 3. c. 62)) and twenty-second (Note: Derby and Chester Roads Act 1782 (22 Geo. 3. c. 107)) years of his present Majesty, for repairing the road from Ashborne in the county of Derby, to Leek in the county of Stafford, and from Ryecroft Gate upon Rushton Common, to Congleton in the county of Chester. (Repealed by Ashbourne and Leek, and Rushton Common and Congleton Roads Act 1826 (7 Geo. 4. c. lxxix))
Wigan and Preston Roads Act 1804 (repealed)	44 Geo. 3. c. xi	3 May 1804
An Act to alter and amend two acts, passed in the nineteenth (Note: Wigan to Preston Road Act 1779 (19 Geo. 3. c. 92)) and thirty-fifth (Note: Wigan to Preston Road Act 1795 (35 Geo. 3. c. 145)) years of his present Majesty, for repairing the roads from Wigan to Preston, in the county palatine of Lancaster. (Repealed by Wigan and Preston Roads Act 1822 (3 Geo. 4. c. iii))
Road from Stafford to Sandon Act 1804 (repealed)	44 Geo. 3. c. xii	3 May 1804
An Act for enlarging the term and powers of two acts, made in the third (Note: Stafford, Sandon and Eccleshall Road Act 1763 (3 Geo. 3. c. 59)) and twenty-third (Note: Stafford and Salop Roads Act 1783 (23 Geo. 3. c. 105)) years of his present Majesty, for repairing the road from the town of Stafford to Sandon in the county of Stafford, and several other roads in the counties of Salop and Stafford, so far as the same relate to the third district of roads therein mentioned. (Repealed by Bridgnorth (Salop.) and Shiffnall Road Act 1825 (6 Geo. 4. c. viii))
Burford Lane and Stow-on-the-Wold Roads Act 1804 (repealed)	44 Geo. 3. c. xiii	3 May 1804
An Act for continuing the term and altering the powers of two acts, of the twenty-eighth year of King George the Second, (Note: Gloucester and Warwick Roads Act 1755 (28 Geo. 2. c. 47)) and the twenty-seventh year of his present Majesty, (Note: Gloucester and Oxford Roads Act 1787 (27 Geo. 3. c. 77)) so far as relate to the roads from the Hand and Post at the top of Burford Lane, (Note: The junction of the A429 Fosse Way and the A424 Burford Road. 51°55′05″N 1°43′31″W) in the county of Gloucester, to Stow on the Wold, (Note: Stow-on-the-Wold.) and from thence to Paddle Brook; (Note: The A429 crosses Paddle Brook near Stretton-on-Fosse. 52°02′11″N 1°40′29″W) and from the Cross Hands on Salford Hill, (Note: The Cross Hands Inn, on the A44 Salford Hill between Moreton in Marsh and Chipping Norton.) in the county of Oxford, to the Hand and Post in the parish of Withington, in the county of Gloucester. (Repealed by Burford Lane and Stow-on-the-Wold Roads Act 1824 (5 Geo. 4. c. ix))
Roads from Littlegate and from Southwell Act 1804 (repealed)	44 Geo. 3. c. xiv	3 May 1804
An Act for continuing the term, and altering and enlarging the powers of two acts, passed for repairing the roads from a place called Littlegate, at the top of Leadenham Hill, in the county of Lincoln, to the west end of Barnby Gate, in Newark-upon-Trent, and from the guide post, at the division of Kelham and Muskham lanes, to Mansfield, and from Southwell to Oxton, in the county of Nottingham; and for repairing the road from the west side of Newark Bridge, to the said guide post. (Repealed by Roads from Littlegate, Newark-upon-Trent and Southwell Act 1826 (7 Geo. 4. c. xxiv))
Ramsey and Bury Drainage Act 1804	44 Geo. 3. c. xv	3 May 1804
An Act for draining and improving certain fen lands and low grounds, within the parishes of Ramsey and Bury, in the county of Huntingdon.
Roads from Tavistock to Plymouth and from Manadon Gate Act 1804 (repealed)	44 Geo. 3. c. xvi	3 May 1804
An Act for the better amending and repairing of the roads leading from the lower market-house in Tavistock, to Old Town Gate, in the borough of Plymouth, and from Manadon Gate to the Old Pound near Plymouth Dock, in the county of Devon. (Repealed by Plymouth and Tavistock Turnpike Roads Act 1847 (10 & 11 Vict. c. xlvii))
Roads from Winchester and Worthy Cow Down Act 1804 (repealed)	44 Geo. 3. c. xvii	3 May 1804
An Act to continue the term, and alter and enlarge the powers of two acts, (Note: Dorset, etc., Roads Act 1762 (2 Geo. 3. c. 61)) (Note: Southampton Roads Act 1783 (23 Geo. 3. c. 109)) passed for amending the road from the north gate of the city of Winchester, over Worthy Cowdown, to Newtown River, and also the road from Worthy Cowdown aforesaid, to the turnpike road at Andover, in the county of Southampton. (Repealed by Roads from Winchester and from Worthy Cow Down Act 1823 (4 Geo. 4. c. lxxxiii))
Roads from Whitchurch and Hinstock Act 1804 (repealed)	44 Geo. 3. c. xviii	3 May 1804
An Act to continue the term, and alter and enlarge the powers of two acts, (Note: Roads from Whitchurch and Hinstock Act 1766 (7 Geo. 3. c. 92)) (Note: Roads from Whitchurch and Hinstock Act 1785 (25 Geo. 3. c. 102)) passed for repairing and widening the roads from Whitechurch in the county of Salop, to the road (Note: The junction of the A525 Keele Road/A531 Crewe Road in Madeley Heath, Staffordshire (the former Newcastle-under-Lyme to Nantwich turnpike road) with the A525 Newcastle Road to Whitchurch. 53°00′26″N 2°19′23″W) between Nantwich, and Newcastle-under-Lyne, and from Hinstock (Note: Hinstock, Shropshire.) to Nantwich aforesaid. (Repealed by Roads from Whitchurch (Salop.) and from Hinstock Act 1824 (5 Geo. 4. c. xxxii))
Milton-next-Sittingbourne Improvement Act 1804 (repealed)	44 Geo. 3. c. xix	3 May 1804
An Act for paving cleansing, lighting, and watching the streets, lanes, and other publick passages and places within the town of Milton next Sittingborne, in the county of Kent; and for removing and preventing encroachments, obstructions, nuisances, and annoyances therein. (Repealed by Milton-next-Sittingbourne Improvement Act 1838 (1 & 2 Vict. c. ii))
Hesket and Cockermouth Roads Act 1804 (repealed)	44 Geo. 3. c. xx	3 May 1804
An Act for continuing the term, and altering and enlarging tho powers of two acts, of the second (Note: Cumberland and Westmorland Roads Act 1762 (2 Geo. 3. c. 81)) and twenty-third (Note: Cumberland and Westmorland Roads Act 1783 (23 Geo. 3. c. 108)) years of his present Majesty, for amending the road from Hesket by Yewes Bridge to Cockermouth, and other roads therein mentioned, in the several counties of Cumberland and Westmorland. (Repealed by Keswick and Plumbgarth's Cross and Windermere Roads Act 1824 (5 Geo. 4. c. xiv))
Road from Montrose to Brechin Act 1804 (repealed)	44 Geo. 3. c. xxi	3 May 1804
An Act for continuing the term and enlarging the powers of so much of an act, made in the twenty-ninth year of his present Majesty, (Note: Forfar Roads Act 1789 (29 Geo. 3. c. 20)) as relates to the road from Montrose to Brechin in the county of Forfar. (Repealed by Forfar Roads Act 1826 (7 Geo. 4. c. cxxviii))
Dublin Watching Act 1804	44 Geo. 3. c. xxii	3 May 1804
An Act for the better defraying the charges of preserving the peace within the city of Dublin, and the district thereof, and establishing a parochial watch therein.
Bank of Scotland Act 1804 (repealed)	44 Geo. 3. c. xxiii	3 May 1804
An Act for further increasing the capital stock of the governor and company of the bank of Scotland. (Repealed by Statute Law (Repeals) Act 1981 (c. 19))
Stockport and Saxon's Lane End Road Act 1804 (repealed)	44 Geo. 3. c. xxiv	3 May 1804
An Act for more effectually repairing and improving the road from Stockport in the county of Chester, to Saxon's Lane End, in the county palatine of Lancaster, and other roads therein mentioned, in the counties of Chester and Lancaster, and in the county of York. (Repealed by Stockport and Bredbury Roads Act 1816 (56 Geo. 3. c. xvii))
Road from Ranton and Ellenhall to the Whitchurch Turnpike near Newport (Salop.) Act 1804 (repealed)	44 Geo. 3. c. xxv	3 May 1804
An Act for the better amending and repairing the road leading from a certain stone which divides the liberties of Ranton and Ellenhall, in the county of Stafford, through Sutton, to the Whitchurch turnpike road, near Newport, in the county of Salop, and several other roads in the counties of Salop and Stafford. (Repealed by Three Districts of Road in Staffordshire and Salop Act 1823 (4 Geo. 4. c. xlvii))
Barton Bridge and Farnworth Road Act 1804 (repealed)	44 Geo. 3. c. xxvi	3 May 1804
An Act for amending, widening, improving and keeping in repair, the road leading from Barton Bridge, in the parish of Eccles, into and through the township of Worsley, to a place called Moses Gate, in the township of Farnworth, all in the county palatine of Lancaster. (Repealed by Barton Bridge and Farnworth Road Act 1825 (6 Geo. 4. c. xlvii))
Temple Bar Improvement Act 1804 (repealed)	44 Geo. 3. c. xxvii	3 May 1804
An Act for raising an additional sum of money for carrying into execution several acts (Note: Temple Bar, etc. Act 1795 (35 Geo. 3. c. 126)) (Note: Temple Bar Improvement Act 1798 (38 Geo. 3. c. lxi)) (Note: Temple Bar Improvement Act 1800 (39 & 40 Geo. 3. c. xlii)) for widening the entrance into the city of London near Temple Bar, for making a more commodious street at Snow Hill, and for raising, on the credit of the orphan's fund, certain fums of money for those purposes; and also for enlarging the powers of the said acts. (Repealed by Statute Law (Repeals) Act 2013 (c. 2))
Road from Bawtry to the Rotherham and Sheffield Turnpike Road Act 1804 (repealed)	44 Geo. 3. c. xxviii	3 May 1804
An Act to continue the term, and alter and enlarge the powers, of two acts, passed in the thirty-third year of his late Majesty, (Note: Yorkshire Roads Act 1759 (33 Geo. 2. c. 55)) and in the twenty-second year of his present Majesty, (Note: Yorkshire Roads Act 1782 (22 Geo. 3. c. 97)) for amending the road from Bawtry to Sheffield, and from Sheffield to the south side of Wortley, in the county of York, where it joins the turnpike road leading from Rotherham to Manchester, so far as the same relates to the road from Bawtry aforesaid to Tinsley, and through part of the town of Tinsley to the place where the fame joins the road from Rotherham to Sheffield. (Repealed by Bawtry and Tinsley Turnpike Road Act 1825 (6 Geo. 4. c. xc))
Brecknock and Abergavenny Canal Act 1804	44 Geo. 3. c. xxix	3 May 1804
An Act for enabling the Company of Proprietors of the Brecknock and Abergavenny Canal to raise a further Sum of Money for completing the said Canal, and the Works thereunto belonging, and for altering and enlarging the Powers of an Act made in the Thirty-third Year of His present Majesty, (Note: Brecknock and Abergavenny Canal Act 1793 (33 Geo. 3. c. 96)) for making the said Canal.
Roads from Stafford and from Bridgford Act 1804 (repealed)	44 Geo. 3. c. xxx	3 May 1804
An Act for continuing the term and powers of two acts, of the third and twenty-third years of his present Majesty, so far as relate to the road leading from the town of Stafford to Sandon, in the county of Stafford, and from the said town of Stafford through Bridgford and Eccleshall to a place called Ireland's Cross, near Woore, in the county of Salop; and from Bridgford aforesaid, to a certain stone which divides the liberty of Ranton and Ellenbell, in the road between Bridgford and Newport, being the first district of roads in the said act mentioned. (Repealed by Roads from Stafford and from Bridgeford Act 1824 (5 Geo. 4. c. lviii))
Cleobury Mortimer, Glazely and Abberley Hill Roads Act 1804 (repealed)	44 Geo. 3. c. xxxi	3 May 1804
An Act for continuing the term, and altering and enlarging the powers, of two acts, made in the second (Note: Salop and Worcester Roads Act 1762 (2 Geo. 3. c. 79)) and twenty-third (Note: Worcester Roads Act 1783 (23 Geo. 3. c. 98)) years of his present Majesty, for repairing the several roads leading from Clesbury Mortimer, The Cross Houses, Glazeley, and the turnpike gate on Abberley Hill, in the counties of Salop and Worcester. (Repealed by Roads from Bridgnorth to Cleobury Mortimer Act 1825 (6 Geo. 4. c. xlix))
Earl of Arran's and Viscount Sudley's Estates Act 1804	44 Geo. 3. c. xxxii	3 May 1804
An Act for vesting in new trustees the estates of the right honourable Arthur Saunders earl of Arran, and the honourable Arthur Saunders Gore, commonly called Lord Viscount Sudley, in the counties of Wexford, Mayo, Sligo, and Donegall, which have not been disposed of by virtue of an act of parliament, made in Ireland in the twenty-fifth year of the reign of his present Majesty, intituled "An act for the more effectually raising a sufficient sum of money for discharging the debts and incumbrances affecting certain lands in the counties of Wexford, Mayo, Sligo, and Donegall, the estates of the right honourable Arthur Saunders, earl of Arran, and the honourable Arthur Saunders Gore, commonly called Lord Viscount Sudley, and for the payment of the debts now due by them respectively, and for other purposes." (Note: Earl of Arran's Estate Act 1785 (25 Geo. 3. c. 7 Pr. (I)))
Leavening Inclosure Act 1804	44 Geo. 3. c. xxxiii	3 May 1804
An Act for inclosing lands in the township of Leavening, in the parish of Acklam, in the east riding of the county of York.
Leicester County Rate Act 1804 (repealed)	44 Geo. 3. c. xxxiv	16 May 1804
An Act for empowering the justices of the peace for the county of Leicester, at their general quarter sessions of the peace, to make a fair and equal county rate for the said county. (Repealed by Leicestershire Act 1985 (c. xvii))
Worcester and Birmingham Canal Act 1804	44 Geo. 3. c. xxxv	16 May 1804
An Act for enabling the company of proprietors of the Worcester and Birmingham canal navigation to raise money to discharge their debts, and to complete the said canal navigation, and for amending the several acts passed for making the said canal navigation.
Dalkeith Improvement and Market Act 1804 (repealed)	44 Geo. 3. c. xxxvi	16 May 1804
An Act to continue and render more effectual two acts, passed in the thirty-third year of his late Majesty, (Note: Dalkeith Beer Duties Act 1759 (33 Geo. 2. c. 53)) and the twenty-second year of his present Majesty, (Note: Dalkeith Beer Duties Act 1782 (22 Geo. 3. c. 18)) for laying a duty of two pennies Scots, or one sixth part of a penny sterling, on every Scots pint of ale or beer brewed for sale or vended within the town and parish of Dalkeith; for paving, cleaning, and lighting the streets of the said town; and for erecting a new publick market therein. (Repealed by Statute Law (Repeals) Act 2013 (c. 2))
West India Docks, Cannon Street and East India Docks Roads Act 1804 (repealed)	44 Geo. 3. c. xxxvii	16 May 1804
An Act for altering and enlarging the term and powers of an act made in the forty-second year of his present Majesty, (Note: Roads from West India Docks Act 1802 (42 Geo. 3. c. ci)) for making, maintaining, watching, lighting, and watering several roads to communicate with the West India Docks, in the Isle of Dogs, in the county of Middlesex, and also, of several acts for repairing the Cannon Street Road, in the said county; and also, for making, maintaining, watching, lighting, and watering a new branch to communicate with the East India docks. (Repealed by Commercial and East India and Barking Roads Act 1828 (9 Geo. 4. c. cxii))
Roads from Brecon and the Furnace Turnpike Gate Act 1804 (repealed)	44 Geo. 3. c. xxxviii	16 May 1804
An Act for continuing the term, and altering and enlarging the powers, of an act, (Note: Radnor Roads Act 1782 (22 Geo. 3. c. 113)) passed for repairing the road from the town of Brecon through the town of Hay, to the Builth and Hay turnpike road near Llyfwen, in the county of Brecon; and for more effectually repairing the road leading from the Furnace turnpike gate to the gate leading to Garthbrengy Common, in the said county. (Repealed by Roads in Brecon, Radnor and Glamorgan Act 1809 (49 Geo. 3. c. xiv))
Brecon, Brobury and Whitney Passage Road Act 1804 (repealed)	44 Geo. 3. c. xxxix	16 May 1804
An Act to continue the term, and alter and enlarge the powers, of two acts, (Note: Hereford Roads, etc. Act 1759 (33 Geo. 2. c. 58)) (Note: Hereford Roads Act 1782 (22 Geo. 3. c. 108)) passed for repairing the roads from the town of Brecon to the parish of Brobury, and to Whitney Passage, in the county of Hereford, so far as relates to such of the roads, comprised in the said acts, as lie in the county of Hereford. (Repealed by Whitney Bridge and Bredwardine Bridge and Hay Roads Act 1822 (3 Geo. 4. c. lxxxvii))
West Bromwich and Sutton Coldfield Road Act 1804	44 Geo. 3. c. xl	16 May 1804
An Act for amending and keeping in repair the road, from the Dudley turnpike road, near the house called The Swan Inn, in the parish of West Bromwich, in the county of Stafford, to the house called The Horse and Jockey, in the parish of Sutton Coldfield, in the county of Warwick.
Maw's Estate Act 1804	44 Geo. 3. c. xli	16 May 1804
An Act for vesting in John Henry Maw, esquire, in fee simple, certain estates comprised in an act of parliament, of the forty-first year of the reign of his present Majesty, intituled, "An act for vesting the settled estates of John Henry Maw, of Warmsworth, in the county of York, esquire, in trustees to be sold, and for laying out the clear monies thence arising, under the direction of the court of chancery, in the purchase of other estates, to be settled in lieu thereof, and to the same uses;" (Note: Maw's Estate Act 1801 (41 Geo. 3. (U.K.) c. ci)) and for, by the present act, settling a fee simple estate of him the said John Henry Maw, of greater value, to the uses of the will of Dorothy Shawe, deceased, in lieu of the said first-mentioned estates.
Haddiscoe Inclosure Act 1804	44 Geo. 3. c. xlii	16 May 1804
An Act for inclosing lands in the manor and parish of Haddiscoe, in the county of Norfolk.
Wetherby and Knaresborough Road Act 1804 (repealed)	44 Geo. 3. c. xliii	18 May 1804
An Act for continuing the term of an act, passed in the twenty-third year of his present Majesty, (Note: Wetherby to Knaresborough Road Act 1783 (23 Geo. 3. c. 103)) for repairing the road from Wetherby to Knaresborough, in the county of York. (Repealed by Wetherby and Knaresborough Road Act 1824 (5 Geo. 4. c. viii))
Dynevor's Estate Act 1804	44 Geo. 3. c. xliv	18 May 1804
An Act to enable the right honourable George Talbot, lord Dynevor, and other persons, claiming under the will of the late right honourable Cecil baroness Dynevor, to grant building leases of certain lands in the parish of Merthyr Tydvil, in the county of Glamorgan, being part of the estates devised by the said will.
Solway Firth Fisheries Act 1804 (repealed)	44 Geo. 3. c. xlv	5 June 1804
An Act for the better regulating and improving the fisheries in the arm of the sea between the county of Cumberland, and the counties of Dumfries and Wigton, and the stewartry of Kirkcudbright, and also the fisheries in the several streams and waters which run into, or communicate with the said arm of the sea. (Repealed by Salmon and Freshwater Fisheries (Consolidation) (Scotland) Act 2003 (asp 15))
Thames and Medway Canal Act 1804	44 Geo. 3. c. xlvi	5 June 1804
An Act for enabling the company of proprietors of the Thames and Medway canal to vary the line of the said canal, and to raise a further fum of money for completing the said canal, and the works thereunto belonging, and for altering and enlarging the powers of an act, made in the thirty-ninth and fortieth year of the reign of his present Majesty, (Note: Thames and Medway Canal Act 1800 (39 & 40 Geo. 3. c. xxiii)) for making the said canal, and a collateral cut thereto.
St. Pancras Poor Relief, Workhouse and Rate Collectors Act 1804 (repealed)	44 Geo. 3. c. xlvii	5 June 1804
An act for the better governing, maintaining, and employing the poor of the parish of Saint Pancras, in the county of Middlesex, for providing a new workhouse for the use of the said parish, for appointing collectors of the rates, and for other purposes therein mentioned. (Repealed by St. Pancras Poor Relief, Workhouse and Rate Collectors Act 1805 (c.xcix))
Radnor and Hereford Roads Act 1804 (repealed)	44 Geo. 3. c. xlviii	5 June 1804
An Act to continue the term, and alter and enlarge the powers of two acts, passed in the seventh (Note: Hereford Roads Act 1766 (7 Geo. 3. c. 67)) and twenty-fourth (Note: Hereford Roads Act 1784 (24 Geo. 3. Sess. 2. c. 69)) years of his present Majesty, for the amending, repairing, and widening several roads in the counties of Radnor and Hereford, in the said acts mentioned, and also for amending, widening, repairing, and diverting other roads in the said county of Radnor. (Repealed by Roads in Radnor, Hereford and Merioneth Act 1824 (5 Geo. 4. c. civ))
Rochdale and Manchester Road Act 1804 (repealed)	44 Geo. 3. c. xlix	5 June 1804
An Act for more effectually amending the road leading from the New Wall, on the Parade, in the township of Castleton, in the parish of Rochdale, through Middleton, to the Mere Stone, in the township of Great Heaton, and to the town of Manchester, all in the county palatine of Lancaster. (Repealed by Rochdale and Manchester Road Act 1823 (4 Geo. 4. c. cvii))
Grantham Road Act 1804 (repealed)	44 Geo. 3. c. l	5 June 1804
An Act for repairing, improving, maintaining, and widening, the road branching out of the great north road by the guide-post at the south end of Spittlegate, in the parish of Grantham, in the county of Lincoln, and leading from thence to the turnpike-road, or near Bridge End, in the same county. (Repealed by Grantham and Bridge End Road Act 1825 (6 Geo. 4. c. liii))
Haddington Roads Act 1804 (repealed)	44 Geo. 3. c. li	29 June 1804
An Act for altering and amending several acts, for making and repairing turnpike roads, in the county of Haddington; for amending other roads branching therefrom; and for rendering more effectual the statute labour within the said county. (Repealed by Haddington Roads Act 1811 (51 Geo. 3. c. cxxvii))
Renfrew, Lanark and Ayr Turnpike Roads Act 1804 (repealed)	44 Geo. 3. c. lii	29 June 1804
An Act for altering, amending, and consolidating several acts, for making and repairing turnpike roads, in the counties of Renfrew, Lanark, and Ayr; repairing other roads branching therefrom; and amending an act, passed in the thirty-second year of his present Majesty, (Note: Renfrew Roads and Bridges Act 1792 (32 Geo. 3. c. 68)) for making effectual the statute labour in the county of Renfrew. (Repealed by Renfrew Roads Act 1825 (6 Geo. 4. c. cviii))
Deptford Improvement Act 1804 (repealed)	44 Geo. 3. c. liii	29 June 1804
An Act for better paving, cleansing, lighting, and watching, the streets, lanes, and other publick passages and places, within the parish of Saint Nicholas Deptford, in the county of Kent, and for removing and preventing encroachments, obstructions, nuisances, and annoyances therein. (Repealed by London Government (Borough of Greenwich) Order in Council 1901 (SR&O 1901/267))
Ellesmere Canal, Railway and Water Supply Act 1804 (repealed)	44 Geo. 3. c. liv	29 June 1804
An Act to enable the Company of Proprietors of the Ellesmere Canal to make a Railway from Ruabon Brook to the Ellesmere Canal, at or near the Aqueduct at Pontcysylltee, in the Parish of Llangollen, in the County of Denbigh; and also, to make several Cuts or Feeders for better supplying the said Canal with Water. (Repealed by Ellesmere and Chester Canal Act 1827 (7 & 8 Geo. 4. c. cii))
Oystermouth Railway or Tramroad Act 1804 (repealed)	44 Geo. 3. c. lv	29 June 1804
An Act for making and maintaining a Railway or Tramroad from the Town of Swansea, into the Parish of Oystermouth in the County of Glamorgan. (Repealed by South Wales Transport Act 1959 (7 & 8 Eliz. 2. c. l))
Swansea Harbour Amendment Act 1804 (repealed)	44 Geo. 3. c. lvi	29 June 1804
An Act for amending and enlarging the Powers of Two Acts, (Note: Swansea Harbour Act 1791 (31 Geo. 3. c. 83)) (Note: Swansea Harbour Act 1796 (36 Geo. 3. c. 93)) passed for preserving the Harbour of Swansea in the County of Glamorgan, and for further improving the same. (Repealed by Swansea Harbour Act 1854 (17 & 18 Vict. c. cxxvi))
St. Mary Stratford Bow Poor Rates Act 1804 (repealed)	44 Geo. 3. c. lvii	29 June 1804
An Act for more equally and effectually assessing and collecting the poor rates within the parish of Saint Mary Stratford Bow, in the county of Middlesex. (Repealed by London Government (Borough of Poplar) Order in Council 1901 (SR&O 1901/220))
Carlisle Improvements Act 1804	44 Geo. 3. c. lviii	29 June 1804
An Act for lighting the streets, lanes and other publick passages and places, within the city of Carlisle, in the county of Cumberland, and the suburbs of the said city; for paving the foot-paths of the streets of the said city and suburbs; and for otherwise improving the said city.
Upton Bridge and Tirley Roads Act 1804 (repealed)	44 Geo. 3. c. lix	29 June 1804
An Act for continuing the term, and altering and enlarging the powers of two acts, passed in the twenty-fifth year of the reign of his late Majesty, (Note: Worcestershire Roads Act 1751 (25 Geo. 2. c. 60)) and the nineteenth year of the reign of his present Majesty, (Note: Worcestershire Roads Act 1779 (19 Geo. 3. c. 89)) for amending the roads leading from the west end of Upton Bridge, in the county of Worcester, to the parish of Tirley, in the county of Gloucester, and other roads in the said acts mentioned; and for amending the road leading from the White Cross, in the parish of Hanley Castle, in the said county to the river Severn. (Repealed by Upton-upon-Severn Roads Act 1825 (6 Geo. 4. c. cliii))
Appleby and Kendal Road and Brough Branch Act 1804 (repealed)	44 Geo. 3. c. lx	29 June 1804
An Act for continuing the term, and altering and enlarging the powers of two acts, passed in the first (Note: Westmorland Roads Act 1760 (1 Geo. 3. c. 43)) and twenty-second (Note: Westmorland Roads Act 1782 (22 Geo. 3. c. 111)) years of his present Majesty, for repairing the road from Appleby to Kirkby Kendal, and from Highgate to Market Brough, all in the county of Westmorland. (Repealed by Appleby and Kendal and other Roads in Westmorland Act 1824 (5 Geo. 4. c. xv))
Westbury and Market Lavington Road Act 1804	44 Geo. 3. c. lxi	29 June 1804
An Act for reviving, continuing, and enlarging the powers of two acts, (Note: Wilts Roads Act 1757 (31 Geo. 2. c. 68)) (Note: Wilts Roads (No. 2) Act 1769 (9 Geo. 3. c. 73)) passed for amending the road leading from Pengate, in the parish of Westbury, to Latchett's Bridge, near the east end of Market Lavington, and other roads in the said acts described, all in the county of Wilts, so far as the said acts relate to the roads comprised in the second district therein mentioned.
Parton and Monkland Mill and other Roads in Herefordshire and Worcestershire Act 1804 (repealed)	44 Geo. 3. c. lxii	29 June 1804
An Act for continuing the term, and altering and enlarging the powers of an act, of the twenty-second year of his present Majesty, (Note: Hereford and Worcester Roads Act 1782 (22 Geo. 3. c. 100)) for amending the road leading from the Willersley turnpike road, near Parton, to Monkland Mill, and other roads therein mentioned, in the counties of Hereford and Worcester. (Repealed by Parton and Monkland Mill Road (Herefordshire and Worcestershire) Act 1826 (7 Geo. 4. c. cxxxv))
Malton and Pickering Road Act 1804 (repealed)	44 Geo. 3. c. lxiii	29 June 1804
An Act for enlarging the term and powers of two acts, of the fifth (Note: Malton and Pickering Road Act 1765 (5 Geo. 3. c. 108)) and twenty-sixth (Note: Malton and Pickering Road Act 1786 (26 Geo. 3. c. 142)) years of his present Majesty, for amending the road from the north end of Old Malton Gate, in the town and borough of New Malton, to the town of Pickering, in the county of York. (Repealed by Road from North Malton Gate to Pickering Act 1825 (6 Geo. 4. c. clviii))
Road from Derby to Uttoxeter Act 1804 (repealed)	44 Geo. 3. c. lxiv	29 June 1804
An Act for reviving the term, and continuing, altering, and enlarging the powers of two acts, passed in the thirty-second year of his late Majesty, (Note: Derby to Newcastle-under-Lyne Road Act 1758 (32 Geo. 2. c. 60)) and in the third year of his present Majesty, (Note: Derby and Uttoxeter Road Act 1763 (3 Geo. 3. c. 57)) so far as the same relate to repairing and widening the road from the town of Derby to the town of Uttoxeter, in the county of Stafford. (Repealed by Road from Derby to Uttoxeter Act 1825 (6 Geo. 4. c. i))
Road from Glasgow to Redburn Bridge Act 1804 (repealed)	44 Geo. 3. c. lxv	29 June 1804
An Act for repealing an act, passed in the forty-third year of his present Majesty, intituled, "An act for continuing the term and consolidating into one act, several acts relating to the road from Glasgow to Redburn Bridge, and for making and repairing the road therein mentioned," (Note: Road from Glasgow to Redburn Bridge Act 1803 (43 Geo. 3. c. cx)) and for granting other powers for the amendment and repair of the said roads. (Repealed by Road from Glasgow to Redburn Bridge Act 1825 (6 Geo. 4. c. cxci))
Road from Market Harborough to Coventry Act 1804 (repealed)	44 Geo. 3. c. lxvi	29 June 1804
An Act to continue the term, and alter and enlarge the powers of two acts, of the twenty-eighth year of King George the Second, (Note: Market Harborough to Coventry Road Act 1755 (28 Geo. 2. c. 40)) and the nineteenth year of his present Majesty, (Note: Market Harborough to Coventry Road Act 1779 (19 Geo. 3. c. 82)) for repairing the road from Market Harborough, in the county of Leicester, to the city of Coventry. (Repealed by Road from Market Harborough to Coventry Act 1823 (4 Geo. 4. c. lxi))
Road from Cromford to Five Lane Ends, Hopton Moor Act 1804 (repealed)	44 Geo. 3. c. lxvii	29 June 1804
An Act for amending, widening, altering, and improving, the road leading from the market-place in Cromford to the Five-Lane-Ends at the guide post on Hopton Moor, and for setting out and making two new roads branching from the said road, one up the valley, by Grange Mill, to Newhaven House, and the other from near the said valley to the town of Wirksworth, all in the county of Derby. (Repealed by Cromford and Newhaven Turnpike Road Act 1825 (6 Geo. 4. c. lxxxix))
York and Oswaldkirk Road Act 1804 (repealed)	44 Geo. 3. c. lxviii	29 June 1804
An Act to continue the term, and alter and enlarge the powers, of so much of two acts, passed in the eighth (Note: Yorkshire Roads Act 1768 (8 Geo. 3. c. 54)) and twenty-ninth (Note: Yorkshire Roads Act 1789 (29 Geo. 3. c. 109)) years of his present Majesty, as relates to the road from the city of York to the top of Oswaldkirk bank, in the county of York. (Repealed by York and Oswaldkirk Bank Road Act 1825 (6 Geo. 4. c. cl))
Chippenham Bridge Road Act 1804 (repealed)	44 Geo. 3. c. lxix	29 June 1804
An Act for more effectually improving the road from Chippenham Bridge, in the county of Wilts, to the top of Togg Hill, in the county of Gloucester, and several other roads therein mentioned, in the said counties, and in the county of Somerset. (Repealed by Marshfield District of Roads Act 1826 (7 Geo. 4. c. xii))
Cambridge to Downham Road Act 1804 (repealed)	44 Geo. 3. c. lxx	29 June 1804
An Act to continue the term, and alter and enlarge the powers, of several acts passed for repairing the road from Cambridge to Ely, and from Ely to Littleport, and from Littleport to Checquer Corner in Downham, in the several counties of Cambridge and Norfolk, and other roads in the said acts mentioned; and for more effectually amending, improving, and keeping in repair certain other roads. (Repealed by Cambridge and Ely Roads Act 1824 (5 Geo. 4. c. lx))
Cureton's Estate Act 1804	44 Geo. 3. c. lxxi	29 June 1804
An Act for enabling the executors and trustees of the will of Thomas Cureton esquire, to carry into execution certain agreements entered into by John Cureton esquire, his son, for the sale of an estate called Pradoe, in the county of Salop, and for the purchase of an estate called The Hurst, in the same county.
Normanton and Woodhouse Inclosures Act 1804	44 Geo. 3. c. lxxii	29 June 1804
An Act for enclosing lands within the several manors or townships of Normanton and Woodhouse, otherwise Newland cum Woodhouse Moor, in the west riding of the county of York.
Simonburn Inclosure Act 1804	44 Geo. 3. c. lxxiii	29 June 1804
An Act for inclosing lands in the parish of Simonburn, in the county of Northumberland.
Long Marton and Marton Park Inclosures Act 1804	44 Geo. 3. c. lxxiv	29 June 1804
An Act for inclosing lands in the manner of Long Marton, in the county of Westmorland, and also the common stinted pasture called Marton Park, within the said manor and county.
Roads in the Highlands of Scotland Act 1804	44 Geo. 3. c. lxxv	3 July 1804
An Act for assessing the proprietors of lands in the county of Inverness towards the expence of making and supporting such roads and bridges therein as shall be approved of by the commissioners appointed by an act of the last session of parliament, (Note: Highway (Scotland) Act 1803 (43 Geo. 3. c. 80)) for making roads and building bridges in the highlands of Scotland.
Tavistock and New Bridge Roads Act 1804 (repealed)	44 Geo. 3. c. lxxvi	3 July 1804
An Act for amending and repairing several roads leading from the Guildhall and Market-House in Tavistock to New Bridge, to Greston Bridge, to Downton Gate, to Riccard's House, to Cherry Brook and Dunnabridge Pound, and to Morwellham and New Quay, all in the county of Devon. (Repealed by Tavistock and New Bridge Roads Act 1825 (6 Geo. 4. c. xci))
Canterbury Streets Act 1804 (repealed)	44 Geo. 3. c. lxxvii	10 July 1804
An Act for empowering the mayor and commonalty of the city of Canterbury to open and make a new street (Note: Guildhall Street, Canterbury; completed in 1806, it avoided the longer route via Mercery Lane and Sun Street. Palace Street was the route to Margate and Ramsgate.) from the High Street to Palace Street within the said city. (Repealed by Local Government Board's Provisional Order Confirmation (No. 9) Act 1890 (53 & 54 Vict. c. clxxviii))
Staines Bridge Act 1804 (repealed)	44 Geo. 3. c. lxxviii	10 July 1804
An Act to amend an act, made in the thirty-first year of His present Majesty, (Note: Staines Bridge Act 1791 (31 Geo. 3. c. 84)) for building a bridge cross the river Thames from Staines to Egham, in the counties of Middlesex and Surrey. (Repealed by Staines Bridge Act 1828 (9 Geo. 4. c. c))
Woodstock and Rollright Lane Roads Act 1804 (repealed)	44 Geo. 3. c. lxxix	10 July 1804
An Act for more effectually repairing and improving the roads leading from Woodstock to Roll Right Lane, and other roads therein mentioned, all in the county of Oxford. (Repealed by Woodstock and Rollright Lane Roads (Oxfordshire) Act 1825 (6 Geo. 4. c. xciv))
John Lyon Grammar School and Harrow to London Road Act 1804 (repealed)	44 Geo. 3. c. lxxx	10 July 1804
An Act for enabling the keepers and governors of the possessions, revenues, and goods, of the free grammar school of John Lyon, (Note: Harrow School.) within the town of Harrow on the Hills in the county of Middlesex, to pay the rents and profits of certain lands bequeathed by the said John Lyon, for repairing the road from Harrow on the Hill to London, to the trustees acting in execution of the several acts for keeping the said road in repair. (Repealed by Metropolis Roads Act 1826 (7 Geo. 4. c. cxlii))
Banff, Elgin, Aberdeen and Inverness County Roads and Spey Bridges Act 1804 (repealed)	44 Geo. 3. c. lxxxi	14 July 1804
An Act for making and repairing certain roads in the counties of Banff, Elgin, Aberdeen, and Inverness; for building bridges over the river Spey, and for regulating the making and repairing the high roads and bridges in the said county of Banff. (Repealed by Banffshire Roads Act 1866 (29 & 30 Vict. c. lxvii))
City of London Coal Trade Act 1804 (repealed)	44 Geo. 3. c. lxxxii	14 July 1804
An Act for altering and enlarging the powers of an act, made in the forty-third year of his present Majesty, (Note: London Coal Trade Act 1803 (43 Geo. 3. c. cxxxiv)) for establishing a free market in the city of London for the sale of coals, and for preventing frauds and impositions in the vend and delivery of all coals brought into the port of London within certain places therein mentioned. (Repealed by London, Westminster, Middlesex, Surrey, Kent and Essex Coal Trade Act 1807 (47 Geo. 3 Sess. 2. c.lxviii))
River Tone Navigation Act 1804	44 Geo. 3. c. lxxxiii	14 July 1804
An Act for explaining and amending two acts, passed in the tenth and eleventh years of King William the Third, (Note: River Tone Navigation Act 1698 (10 Will. 3. c. 8)) and the sixth year of Queen Anne, (Note: River Tone Improvement Act 1707 (6 Ann. c. 70)) for making and keeping navigable the river Tone, from Bridgewater to Taunton, in the county of Somerset.
London Debtors' Prisons Act 1804 (repealed)	44 Geo. 3. c. lxxxiv	20 July 1804
An Act for enabling the sheriffs of the city of London to remove the debtors and prisoners in the Poultry Compter to another place of Confinement in the said city. (Repealed by Statute Law (Repeals) Act 2008 (c. 12))
St. Martin-in-the-Fields Burial Ground, Chapel and Clergyman's House Act 1804 (repealed)	44 Geo. 3. c. lxxxv	20 July 1804
An Act for providing an additional burial ground, (Note: St Martin's Gardens, Camden. 51°32′20″N 0°08′22″W) and erecting a chapel thereon, for the parish of Saint Martin in the Fields, in the county of Middlesex, and also a house for the residence of a clergyman to officiate in burying the dead. (Repealed by London Government (City of Westminster) Order in Council 1901 (SR&O 1901/278))
Southwark Improvement Act 1804 (repealed)	44 Geo. 3. c. lxxxvi	20 July 1804
An Act for altering and amending an act, passed in the sixth year of his present Majesty, (Note: Southwark Improvement Act 1766 (6 Geo. 3. c. 24)) for paving the streets and lanes within the borough of Southwark, and certain parts adjacent, in the county of Surrey, and for cleansing, lighting, and watching, the same; and also the courts, yards, alleys, and passages adjoining thereto, and for preventing annoyances therein, so far as the same relates to the west division thereof, as therein mentioned. (Repealed by Statute Law (Repeals) Act 2013 (c. 2))
Lincoln City and County Drainage and Skellingthorpe Inclosure Act 1804	44 Geo. 3. c. lxxxvii	20 July 1804
An Act for embanking, draining, and improving certain lands in the city of Lincoln and county thereof, and in the parishes or townships of Boultham, Skellingthorpe, Saxelby, Broxholme, North Carlton, South Carlton, Burten, and Hathow, in the county of Lincoln; and for inclosing lands in the said parish of Skellingthorpe.
Voylas Chapel Weddings Act 1804	44 Geo. 3. c. lxxxviii	20 July 1804
An Act for enabling the officiating minister for the time being of the chapel of Voylas, in the county of Denbigh, to publish banns and solemnize marriages in the said chapel.
City of London Tithe Assessment Act 1804 (repealed)	44 Geo. 3. c. lxxxix	28 July 1804
An Act for the Relief of certain Incumbents of Livings in the City of London. (Repealed by City of London (Various Powers) Act 1950 (14 Geo. 6. c. v))

=== Private acts ===
Short title	Citation	Royal assent
Long title
Little Hucklow Inclosure Act 1804	44 Geo. 3. c. 2 Pr.	9 March 1804
An Act for inclosing lands within the township of Little Hucklow, in the county of Derby.
Kettering Inclosure Act 1804	44 Geo. 3. c. 3 Pr.	9 March 1804
An Act for inclosing lands within the manor and parish of Kettering, in the county of Northampton.
Hanszen's Naturalization Act 1804	44 Geo. 3. c. 4 Pr.	9 March 1804
An Act for naturalizing Paul Hanszen.
Portrane and Donabate Inclosure Act 1804	44 Geo. 3. c. 5 Pr.	23 March 1804
An Act for inclosing lands in the parishes of Portram and Donabate, in the county of Dublin.
Beaminster Inclosure Act 1804	44 Geo. 3. c. 6 Pr.	23 March 1804
An Act for inclosing lands in the parish of Beaminister, in the county of Dorset.
Goldings' Name Act 1804	44 Geo. 3. c. 7 Pr.	23 March 1804
An Act to enable the reverend George Golding Graves clerk, and his first and other sons, and the heirs male of their bodies, to take, use, and bear the name and arms of Golding, pursuant to the will of George Golding esquire, deceased.
Biedermann's Naturalization Act 1804	44 Geo. 3. c. 8 Pr.	23 March 1804
An Act for naturalizing Henry Augustus Biedermann.
Röhrs' Naturalization Act 1804	44 Geo. 3. c. 9 Pr.	23 March 1804
An Act for naturalizing Charles William Röhrs.
Boileau's Naturalization Act 1804	44 Geo. 3. c. 10 Pr.	23 March 1804
An Act for naturalizing Daniel Boileau.
Montgomery's Estate Act 1804	44 Geo. 3. c. 11 Pr.	3 May 1804
An Act for the more effectual and beneficial raising of certain fums of money decreed by the high court of chancery of Ireland to be raised out of the estates of George Montgomery esquire, a lunatick, in the counties of Cavan and Fermanagh in Ireland, by sale of the inheritance of a competent part of the said estates.
Bradsted Rectory Act 1804	44 Geo. 3. c. 12 Pr.	3 May 1804
An Act for effectuating an exchange of certain parts of the glebe land belonging to the rectory of Bradsted, in the county of Kent, for certain lands, the property of the right honourable Frederick Campbell, commonly called Lord Frederick Campbell, within the parish of Bradsted aforesaid.
Sawtry Inclosure Act 1804	44 Geo. 3. c. 13 Pr.	3 May 1804
An Act for dividing and draining lands in the parishes of Saltree, otherwise Sawtry All Saints, and Saltree otherwise Sawtry Saint Andrew, in the county of Huntingdon.
Tottington Inclosure Act 1804	44 Geo. 3. c. 14 Pr.	3 May 1804
An Act for inclosing lands in the hamlet of Tottington, in the parish of Leominster, in the county of Sussex.
Goring Inclosure Act 1804	44 Geo. 3. c. 15 Pr.	3 May 1804
An Act for inclosing lands in the parish of Goring, in the county of Sussex.
Leicester Inclosure Act 1804	44 Geo. 3. c. 16 Pr.	3 May 1804
An Act for inclosing lands in the parish of Saint Mary, in or near the borough of Leicester, in the county of Leicester.
Sutton Inclosure Act 1804	44 Geo. 3. c. 17 Pr.	3 May 1804
An Act for inclosing lands in the parish of Sutton, in the county of Gloucester.
West Burton Inclosure Act 1804	44 Geo. 3. c. 18 Pr.	3 May 1804
An Act for inclosing lands in the manor of West Burton, in the north riding of the county of York.
Thetford Inclosure Act 1804	44 Geo. 3. c. 19 Pr.	3 May 1804
An Act for inclosing lands in the parishes of Thetford Saint Peter, in the county of Norfolk, and Thetford Saint Cuthbert, and Thetford Saint Mary, in the counties of Norfolk and Suffolk.
Gotham Inclosure Act 1804	44 Geo. 3. c. 20 Pr.	3 May 1804
An Act for inclosing lands in the parish of Gotham, in the county of Nottingham.
Ohrly's Naturalization Act 1804	44 Geo. 3. c. 21 Pr.	3 May 1804
An Act for naturalizing Johannes Hendrik Ohrly.
Mildmay's Estate Act 1804	44 Geo. 3. c. 22 Pr.	16 May 1804
An Act for enabling Sir Henry Paulet St. John Mildmay Baronet, and dame Jane his wife, to lease part of the settled estates in the county of Essex, devised by the late dame Anne Mildmay, of Moulsham Hall, in the said county.
North Bradley Inclosure Act 1804	44 Geo. 3. c. 23 Pr.	16 May 1804
An Act for inclosing lands within the manors of North Bradley and Southwick, in the parish of North Bradley, in the county of Wilts.
Waborne Inclosure Act 1804	44 Geo. 3. c. 24 Pr.	16 May 1804
An Act for inclosing lands in the parish of Waborne, in the county of Norfolk.
Iken Inclosure Act 1804	44 Geo. 3. c. 25 Pr.	16 May 1804
An Act for inclosing lands in the parish of Iken, in the county of Suffolk.
Kirkheaton Inclosure Act 1804	44 Geo. 3. c. 26 Pr.	5 June 1804
An Act to amend an act passed in thirty-ninth year of his present Majesty, (Note: Kirkheaton Inclosure Act 1799 (39 Geo. 3. c. 113 Pr.)) for inclosing and leasing certain common moors and waste grounds, lying within the township of Kirkeaton, in the west riding of the county of York, and for other purposes in the said act mentioned.
Shuttington Inclosure Act 1804	44 Geo. 3. c. 27 Pr.	5 June 1804
An Act for inclosing lands in the manor of Alvecote and Shuttington, in the parish of Shuttington, in the county of Warwick.
Sporle and Palgrave Inclosure Act 1804	44 Geo. 3. c. 28 Pr.	5 June 1804
An Act for inclosing lands in the parish of Sporle, and hamlet of Palgrave, in the county of Norfolk.
Southcote's Estate Act 1804	44 Geo. 3. c. 29 Pr.	29 June 1804
An Act for vesting certain estates situate in the county of Norfolk, devised by the will of Bridget Southcote, widow, deceased, in trustees, for sale, and for laying out the money arising from the sale thereof in the purchase of estates in the county of Essex, to be settled to the uses devised by the said will of the said Bridget Southcote.
Burges's Estate Act 1804	44 Geo. 3. c. 30 Pr.	29 June 1804
An Act for discharging John Fydell, late of Chepstow, in the county of Monmouth, but now of the city of Bristol, in the county of Somerset, esquire, from being a trustee of the freehold estates of Thomas Surges, late of Weymouth Street Portland Place, in the county of Middlesex, esquire, deceased, and for divesting the fee simple and inheritance of such parts of the same freehold estates of the said Thomas Burges, as by his will, are devised to the said John Fydell, as a trustee, out of the said John Fydell, and for investing the fee simple and inheritance of the same freehold estates in Abraham Toulman, esquire, as a trustee in the place and stead of the said John Fydell.
Dee Embankments Act 1804 or the Hawarden Embankments Act 1804	44 Geo. 3. c. 31 Pr.	29 June 1804
An Act for more effectually maintaining, and keeping in repair, the embankments and other works on the south fide of the channel of the river Dee, within the manor and parish of Hawarden, in the county of Flint, and for erecting and keeping in repair, other embankments and works to prevent injury being done, as well to the allotments of land, made, by virtue of an act, passed in the eighteenth year of his present Majesty, (Note: Saltney Marsh Inclosure Act 1778 (18 Geo. 3. c. 90 Pr.)) from a certain common called Saltney Marsh, as also to certain lands the property of Sir Stephen Richard Glynne, baronet.
Kingsdon Inclosure Act 1804	44 Geo. 3. c. 32 Pr.	29 June 1804
An Act for inclosing lands in Kingsdon, in the county of Somerfet.
Kingsutton Inclosure Act 1804	44 Geo. 3. c. 33 Pr.	29 June 1804
An Act for inclosing lands within, and belonging to, the manors and parish of Kingsutton, in the county of Northampton.
Keinton Mandefield Inclosure Act 1804	44 Geo. 3. c. 34 Pr.	29 June 1804
An Act for inclosing lands in the parish of Keinton Mandefield, in the county of Somerset.
Bridgham Inclosure Act 1804	44 Geo. 3. c. 35 Pr.	29 June 1804
An Act for inclosing lands, in the parish of Bridgham, in the county of Norfolk.
Charney Inclosure Act 1804	44 Geo. 3. c. 36 Pr.	29 June 1804
An Act for inclosing lands in the township or hamlet of Charney, in the parish of Longworth, in the county of Berks.
Crimplesham Inclosure Act 1804	44 Geo. 3. c. 37 Pr.	29 June 1804
An Act for inclosing lands in the parish of Crimplesham, in the county of Norfolk.
Shaddingfield Inclosure Act 1804 or the Shaddingfield Common Inclosure Act 1804	44 Geo. 3. c. 38 Pr.	29 June 1804
An Act for inclosing Shaddingfield common, in the county of Suffolk.
Temple Guiting Inclosure Act 1804	44 Geo. 3. c. 39 Pr.	29 June 1804
An Act for inclosing lands within the parish of Temple Guiting, in the county of Gloucester.
Carlby Inclosure Act 1804	44 Geo. 3. c. 40 Pr.	29 June 1804
An Act for inclosing lands in the parish of Carlby, in the county of Lincoln, and also certain parts of an intercommon or heath, heretofore called Aunby Heath, within, or adjoining to, the same parish.
Bringhurst, &c. Inclosure Act 1804	44 Geo. 3. c. 41 Pr.	29 June 1804
An Act for inclosing lands in the parish, townships, or hamlets of Bringhurst, Great Easton, and Drayton, in the county of Leicester.
Alverton Inclosure Act 1804	44 Geo. 3. c. 42 Pr.	29 June 1804
An Act for inclosing lands in the township or hamlet of Alverton, in the county of Nottingham.
Topcroft and Denton Inclosure Act 1804	44 Geo. 3. c. 43 Pr.	29 June 1804
An Act for inclosing lands in the parishes of Topcroft and Denton, in the county of Norfolk.
Binbrooke Inclosure Act 1804	44 Geo. 3. c. 44 Pr.	29 June 1804
An Act for inclosing lands in the parishes of Binbrooke Saint Gabriel and Binbrooke Saint Mary in the county of Lincoln.
Ruislip Inclosure Act 1804	44 Geo. 3. c. 45 Pr.	29 June 1804
An Act for inclosing lands in the parish of Ruislip, otherwise Riselip, in the county of Middlesex.
Manea Inclosure Act 1804	44 Geo. 3. c. 46 Pr.	29 June 1804
An Act for inclosing lands in the hamlet of Mama, in the isle of Ely, and county of Cambridge.
Whitwood Inclosure Act 1804	44 Geo. 3. c. 47 Pr.	29 June 1804
An Act for inclosing lands in the manor and township of Whitwood, in the parish of Featherstone, in the west riding of the county of York.
Gonerby Inclosure Act 1804	44 Geo. 3. c. 48 Pr.	29 June 1804
An Act for inclosing lands in the lordships of Great Gonerby and Manthorpe cum Little Gonerby, in the county of Lincoln.
Rousby Moor Inclosure Act 1804	44 Geo. 3. c. 49 Pr.	29 June 1804
An Act for inclosing lands in the township of Rousby, and hamlets of Hither and Far Scaling, in the parish of Hinderwell, in the county of York.
Romsey Inclosure Act 1804	44 Geo. 3. c. 50 Pr.	29 June 1804
An Act for inclosing lands in the parish of Romsey Extra, in the County of Southampton.
Ufton Inclosure Act 1804	44 Geo. 3. c. 51 Pr.	29 June 1804
An Act for inclosing lands in the parish of Ufton, in the county of Berks.
Verbeke's Naturalization Act 1804	44 Geo. 3. c. 52 Pr.	29 June 1804
An Act for naturalizing Michael Verbeke.
Kauffmann's Naturalization Act 1804	44 Geo. 3. c. 53 Pr.	29 June 1804
An Act for naturalizing Christian Henry Kauffmann.
Phillips' Naturalization Act 1804	44 Geo. 3. c. 54 Pr.	29 June 1804
An Act for naturalizing Samuel Levi Phillips.
Great Totham Inclosure Act 1804	44 Geo. 3. c. 55 Pr.	30 June 1804
An Act for inclosing lands in the parish of Great Totham, in the county of Essex.
Netherdale Inclosure Act 1804	44 Geo. 3. c. 56 Pr.	3 July 1804
An Act for inclosing lands in the manor of Netherdale, in the west riding of York.
Saint Andrew Auckland Inclosure Act 1804	44 Geo. 3. c. 57 Pr.	10 July 1804
An Act for inclosing lands in the parish of Saint Andrew Auckland, in the county of Durham .
Ampleforth Inclosure Act 1804	44 Geo. 3. c. 58 Pr.	10 July 1804
An Act for inclosing lands within the township or townships of Ampleforth and Oswaldkirk in the county of York.
Arlsey Inclosure Act 1804	44 Geo. 3. c. 59 Pr.	10 July 1804
An Act for inclosing lands in the parish of Arlsey, in the of Bedford.
Ricketts's Estate Act 1804	44 Geo. 3. c. 60 Pr.	14 July 1804
An Act for effecting the sale of a freehold messuage, with the lands thereto belonging, situate at Southampton, whereof Sophia Ricketts, widow of George Poyntz Ricketts, esquire, is tenant for life, and for investing the purchase monies of the shares which stand limited to the infant children of the said George Poyntz Ricketts, and Sophia his wife, in remainder, in fee simple, in some other real estate, to be settled in lieu of such shares, and to the same uses.
Astwick Inclosure Act 1804	44 Geo. 3. c. 61 Pr.	14 July 1804
An Act for inclosing lands in the parish of Astwick, in the county of Bedford.
Fagel's Naturalization Act 1804	44 Geo. 3. c. 62 Pr.	14 July 1804
An Act for naturalizing James Fagel.
Bishop of London's (Paddington) Estate Act 1804	44 Geo. 3. c. 63 Pr.	20 July 1804
An Act for altering and amending an act of parliament, passed in the thirty-fifth year of the reign of his present Majesty, intituled, "An Act for enabling the lord bishop of London to grant a lease, with powers of renewal, of lands in the parish of Paddington, in the county of Middlesex, for the purpose of building upon;" (Note: Bishop of London's (Paddington) Estate Act 1795 (35 Geo. 3. c. 83 Pr.)) and for granting further powers, the belter to carry into execution the purposes of the said act.
Brington Inclosure Act 1804	44 Geo. 3. c. 64 Pr.	20 July 1804
An Act for inclosing lands in the parish of Brington, in the county of Huntingdon.
Great Staughton Inclosure Act 1804	44 Geo. 3. c. 65 Pr.	20 July 1804
An Act for inclosing lands in the parish of Great Staughton, in the county of Huntingdon.
Hogsthorpe and Mumby Inclosure Act 1804	44 Geo. 3. c. 66 Pr.	20 July 1804
An Act for inclofing lands in the parishes of Hogsthorpe and Mumby cum Chapel, in the county of Lincoln.
Islip Inclosure Act 1804	44 Geo. 3. c. 67 Pr.	20 July 1804
An Act for inclosing lands in the parish of Islip, in the county of Oxford.
Tighe's Divorce Act 1804	44 Geo. 3. c. 68 Pr.	20 July 1804
An Act to dissolve the marriage of Robert Tighe, esquire, with Esther Tighe, his now wife, and to enable him to marry again, and for other purposes therein mentioned.
Gerock's Naturalization Act 1804	44 Geo. 3. c. 69 Pr.	20 July 1804
An Act for naturalizing Christopher Gerock.
Uhde's Naturalization Act 1804	44 Geo. 3. c. 70 Pr.	20 July 1804
An Act for naturalizing Bernard Uhde.
Veichtner's Naturalization Act 1804	44 Geo. 3. c. 71 Pr.	20 July 1804
An Act for naturalizing John Frederick Veichtner .
De Brouquens's Naturalization Act 1804	44 Geo. 3. c. 72 Pr.	20 July 1804
An Act for naturalizing Joseph Charles Leon de Boubée Brouquens, an infant.

=== Sources ===
- The Statutes at Large. Vol. 45, Part 1. 44 George III. 1803-4. Cambridge: Cambridge University Press. 1805 – via Internet Archive.
- The Statutes at Large. Vol. 45, Part 1. 44 George III. 1803-4. Cambridge: Cambridge University Press. 1805 – via Google Books.
- Journals of the House of Commons. Vol. 59. London: His Majesty's Stationery Office. pp. 3–444.
- Chronological Table of and Index to the Statutes. Vol. 1: To the End of the Session 59 Vict. Sess. 2 (1895) (13th ed.). London: Her Majesty's Stationery Office. 1896. pp. 178–180 – via Google Books.
- Chronological Table of and Index to the Statutes. Vol. 1: To the End of the Session 59 Vict. Sess. 2 (1895) (13th ed.). London: Her Majesty's Stationery Office. 1896. pp. 178–180 – via Google Books.
- "Statutes of the United Kingdom of Great Britain and Ireland, 1804". Irish Statute Book. Office of the Attorney General, Government of Ireland.

== See also ==
- List of acts of the Parliament of the United Kingdom
