= Northern Ireland Law Commission =

- Northern Ireland Law Commission logo

- Northern Ireland within the UK and Europe
- Predecessor: Law Reform Advisory Committee
- Established: 2007
- Dissolved: 2015
- Type: Advisory non-departmental public body sponsored by the Northern Ireland Executive Department of Justice
- Legal status: Created by the Justice (Northern Ireland) Act 2002, non-operational as of April 2015
- Purpose: To keep the law of Northern Ireland under review and to recommend reform where needed
- Headquarters: Massey House, Belfast BT4 3SX
- Coordinates: 54.598165°N 5.831333°W
- Region served: Northern Ireland
- Official language: English
- Website: nilawcommission.gov.uk

The Northern Ireland Law Commission was a Law Commission in Northern Ireland created under section 50 of the Justice (Northern Ireland) Act 2002, implementing recommendations following the Good Friday Agreement. It replaced the non-statutory Law Reform Advisory Committee. The commission has been "non-operational" since April 2015.

The Northern Ireland Law Commission kept the law of Northern Ireland under review, with a view to law reform. It had five members, a part-time chairman and four full-time commissioners, appointed by the Secretary of State for Northern Ireland. The chairman was a judge of the High Court of Northern Ireland, who retained judicial office. The other commissioners were a barrister, a solicitor, a legal academic, and a layperson.

== See also ==
- Scottish Law Commission
- Law Commission (England and Wales)
- Law Reform Commission (Ireland)
