= Law Commission (England and Wales) =

British independent law commission

- Comisiwn y Gyfraith
- Law Commission logo

- England and Wales within the UK and Europe
- Established: 1965
- Type: Advisory non-departmental public body sponsored by the Ministry of Justice
- Legal status: Created by the Law Commissions Act 1965
- Purpose: To keep the law of England and Wales under review and to recommend reform where needed
- Headquarters: 52 Queen Anne's Gate, London SW1H 9AG
- Coordinates: 51.499996°N 0.134134°W
- Region served: Primarily England and Wales; Occasionally Northern Ireland; Rarely the Crown dependencies and the British Overseas Territories
- Official languages: De jure: English and Welsh; De facto and working language: English
- Chair: Sir Peter Fraser
- Chief Executives: Joanna Otterburn and Stephanie Hack
- Website: www.lawcom.gov.uk

In England and Wales the Law Commission (Welsh: Comisiwn y Gyfraith) is an independent law commission set up by Parliament by the Law Commissions Act 1965 to keep the law of England and Wales under review and to recommend reforms. The organisation is headed by a chair (a judge of the High Court or Court of Appeal, currently Sir Peter Fraser LJ) and four law commissioners. It proposes changes to the law that will make the law simpler, more accessible, fairer, modern and more cost-effective. It consults widely on its proposals and in the light of the responses to public consultation, it presents recommendations to the UK Parliament that, if legislated upon, would implement its law reform recommendations. The commission is part of the Commonwealth Association of Law Reform Agencies.

== Activities ==
The Law Commissions Act 1965 requires the Law Commission to submit "programmes for the examination of different branches of the law" to the Lord Chancellor for his approval before undertaking new work.

Every three or four years the Law Commission consults widely, asking for suggestions for projects to include in these programmes.

Decisions about whether to include a project are based on:

- the strength of the need for law reform
- the importance of the issues it will cover
- the availability of resources in terms of both expertise and funding
- whether the project is suitable to be dealt with by the independent Commission.

The Law Commission can also take on additional projects that are referred directly by Government departments.

At any one time, around 15 to 20 areas of law will be under review. Law Commission projects cover a wide range of subjects that belong to the criminal law, property law, family and trust law, public law, commercial law.

The Law Commission has a rolling programme of law reform projects, and every three years or so it consults on any new projects that should be added to the list of those that it already has under way. In December 2017 it published its 13th Programme of Law Reform.

Approximately 70% of the Law Commission's law reform recommendations have been enacted or accepted by government. The Law Commission Act 2009 applies.

== Current commissioners ==
The current commissioners are:

- Peter Fraser (chair)
- Prof Alison Young
- Prof Lisa Webley
- Prof Penney Lewis
- Prof Solène Rowan

== Chairs ==
The chair of the Law Commission is usually a High Court judge. Chairs are often promoted to the Court of Appeal. Until 2008, promotion would occur soon after or shortly before the end of their term as chair, with one exception: Samuel Cooke (whose term as chair ended with his death in 1978). Terence Etherton was promoted to the Court of Appeal approximately two years into his term. The most recent incumbents were appointed near the beginning of their terms.

- Leslie Scarman (1965–1973)
- Samuel Cooke (1973–1978)
- Michael Kerr (1978–1981)
- Ralph Gibson (1981–1985)
- Roy Beldam (1985–1989)
- Peter Gibson (1990–1992)
- Henry Brooke (1993–1995)
- Mary Arden (1996–1999)
- Robert Carnwath (1999–2002)
- Roger Toulson (2002–2006)
- Terence Etherton (2006–2009)
- James Munby (2009–2012)
- David Lloyd Jones (2012–2015)
- David Bean (2015–2018)
- Nicholas Green (2018–2023)
- Peter Fraser (2023–present)

== See also ==
- Law reform
- Criminal Law Revision Committee
- Scottish Law Commission
- Northern Ireland Law Commission
- Criminal Law Reform Now Network

For a complete list of Law Commission reports and papers about criminal law generally, see Law Commission: Criminal Law Reports and Papers.
