= Law Commissions Act 1965 =

Act of the Parliament of the United Kingdom

Law Commissions Act 1965 (Note: Section 7.)
- Act of Parliament
- Parliament of the United Kingdom
- Long title: An Act to provide for the constitution of Commissions for the reform of the law.
- Citation: 1965 c. 22
- Territorial extent: United Kingdom

Dates
- Royal assent: 15 June 1965
- Commencement: 15 June 1965 (Note: The Acts of Parliament (Commencement) Act 1793.)
Other legislation
Amends	House of Commons Disqualification Act 1957
Amended by	Sheriff Courts (Scotland) Act 1971; Transfer of Functions (Secretary of State and Lord Advocate) Order 1972; House of Commons Disqualification Act 1975; Northern Ireland Assembly Disqualification Act 1975; Administration of Justice Act 1982; Law Reform (Miscellaneous Provisions) (Scotland) Act 1985; Courts and Legal Services Act 1990; Scotland Act 1998 (Consequential Modifications) (No.2) Order 1999; Justice (Northern Ireland) Act 2002; Constitutional Reform Act 2005; Tribunals, Courts and Enforcement Act 2007; Law Commission Act 2009; Wales Act 2014

Status: Amended

Text of statute as originally enacted

Revised text of statute as amended

Text of the Law Commissions Act 1965 as in force today (including any amendments) within the United Kingdom, from legislation.gov.uk.

The Law Commissions Act 1965 (c. 22) is an act of the Parliament of the United Kingdom which created the Law Commission of England and Wales and the Scottish Law Commission, tasked with reviewing English and Scots law respectively.

== Background ==
During the Victorian era, successive Lord Chancellors made an effort to reform the law; as Gerald Dworkin writes, "there was hardly one of the Victorian Lord Chancellors who did not have something to his credit in the sphere of legal reform." During the twentieth century this changed, with Lord Chancellors not having the time or energy to add law reform to their host of judicial and political duties. Lord Sankey did set up the Law Reform Commission, which led directly to the English and Scottish Law Commissions.

Lord Gardiner convinced Harold Wilson to add law reform to the Labour Party manifesto for the 1964 general election, and when the Labour Party were returned to power, Gardiner made a promise to set up a Law Commission a requirement for his acceptance of the post of Lord Chancellor. The Law Commissions Bill was introduced to Parliament on 20 January 1965, receiving its second reading on 8 February and royal assent on 15 June, a remarkably fast passage of a bill.

== Provisions ==
The act created two commissions; the Law Commission of England and Wales to review English law and the Scottish Law Commission to review Scots law. The English commission has five commissioners, including a chairman, all appointed by the Lord Chancellor. The commissioners are to have experience working in the legal profession, by legal academics or be members of the judiciary. Each commissioner sits for five years, although they may resign at any point and still be eligible for reappointment. The Scots Commission has a similar make-up.

The commissions' duties are:

1. to consider any proposals for law reform given or directed to them;
2. to prepare recommendations for programs of law reform;
3. to prepare draft bills or other documents for such programs;
4. to prepare statute law revision or consolidation programs;
5. to provide legal advice to government departments concerning law reform;
6. to examine the legal systems of other nations to obtain any information that would facilitate programs of law reform.

The Law Commissions are assisted by parliamentary draftsmen, research and administrative assistants and officials from the Government Legal Service.

== See also ==
- Law Commission of England and Wales
- Scottish Law Commission

== Bibliography ==
- Dworkin, Gerald (1965). "Law Commissions Act 1965". Modern Law Review. 28 (6). Blackwell Publishing. ISSN 0026-7961.
- Mothersole, Brenda (2000). A-level law in action (2nd ed.). Cengage Learning. ISBN 0-333-72780-0.
- Halsbury's Statutes. Fourth Edition. 2008 Reissue. Volume 41. Page 767.
