= Samuel Cooke (judge) =

British judge (1912–1978)

Sir Samuel Burgess Ridgway Cooke (16 March 1912 – 12 April 1978) was a British barrister and High Court judge. He served as the second chairman of the Law Commission between 1973 and his death in 1978.

== Life and career ==
Cooke was born in Lancaster, the son of a railway clerk. He was educated at the Lancaster Royal Grammar School and Gonville and Caius College, Cambridge, where he took Firsts in both the Classics and Law tripos. He was President of the Cambridge Union in Lent 1934.

Cooke was called to the bar by Lincoln's Inn in November 1936, having placed first in the bar final examination and receiving the Certificate of Honour. In 1938 he joined the Office of the Parliamentary Counsel, where he contributed to the drafting of the Education Act 1944 and of the Crown Proceedings Act 1947.

In 1946, he returned to private practice, joining the chambers of Patrick Devlin KC (later Lord Devlin). In 1947 he served as constitutional adviser to Lord Mountbatten, the Viceroy of India, at the time of Indian independence. He was Junior Counsel to Ministry of Labour and National Service between 1950 and 1960, although most of his practice at the bar consisted of commercial advisory work. He was appointed Queen's Counsel in 1960 and elected a bencher of Lincoln's Inn in 1966.

In 1967, Cooke was appointed a Justice of the High Court of Justice (assigned to the Queen's Bench Division), receiving the customary knighthood. In 1973, he was appointed as the second chairman of the Law Commission. Afflicted by a nervous system disease, Cooke died in office on 12 April 1978.
