= South African Law Reform Commission =

The South African Law Reform Commission (SALRC) is a law reform commission which investigates the state of South African law and makes proposals for its reform to Parliament and the provincial legislatures. It is an independent advisory statutory body established by the South African Law Reform Commission Act of 1973. It investigates matters appearing on a programme approved by the Minister of Justice and Constitutional Development. The commission is part of the Commonwealth Association of Law Reform Agencies.

== Members of the Commission ==
The members of the SALRC are appointed by the President and are drawn from the judiciary, legal profession and academic institutions. The current members of the SALRC are:

- Emeritus Justice Chris Jafta (Chairperson)
- Prof Wesahl Domingo (Deputy Chairperson)
- Prof Debbie Collier
- Prof Karthigasen (Karthy) Govender
- Prof Tshepo Herbert Mongalo
- Dr Martha Keneilwe Radebe
- Dr Sejako Senatle, SC
- Dr Nazreen Shaik-Peremanov
- Dr Jacob Buti "JB" Skosana

In February 2012, the Minister of Justice and Constitutional Development Jeff Radebe told reporters that the SALRC would be re-engineered to boost its legal research capacity and to better serve the needs of South Africa.
