= Commonwealth Association of Law Reform Agencies =

The Commonwealth Association of Law Reform Agencies is an international association of permanent law reform agencies within Commonwealth nations that work on law reform. The organization hosts regular conferences which focus on developing reforms. The organization was formed in 2003 as part of Law Reform Agencies Day during the Commonwealth Law Conference.

== Membership ==
As of 2017, the website for the association reports the following membership organizations:

- Alberta Law Reform Institute, Canada
- British Columbia Law Institute, Canada
- England and Wales Law Commission
- Jersey Law Commission
- Lesotho Law Reform Commission
- Malawi Law Commission
- Manitoba Law Reform Commission, Canada
- Mauritius Law Reform Commission
- Namibia Law Reform and Development Commission
- New Zealand Law Commission
- Nigeria Law Reform Commission
- Scottish Law Commission
- South African Law Reform Commission
- Tanzania Law Reform Commission
- Trinidad and Tobago Law Reform Commission
- Uganda Law Reform Commission
- Vanuatu Law Commission
- Victorian Law Reform Commission, Australia
