= Theft Act 1607 =

Act of the pre-Union Parliament of Scotland

Theft Act 1607 (Note: The citation of this act by this short title was authorised by section 2 of, and schedule 2 to, the Statute Law Revision (Scotland) Act 1964.)
- Act of Parliament
- Parliament of Scotland
- Long title: Act Anent woddis parkis planting dowcattis et cetera.
- Citation: 1607 c. 6 (12mo ed: c.3)
- Territorial extent: Scotland

Dates
- Royal assent: 11 August 1607

Other legislation
- Amended by: Statute Law Revision (Scotland) Act 1964; Salmon and Freshwater Fisheries (Consolidation) (Scotland) Act 2003

Status: Amended

Revised text of statute as amended

Text of the Theft Act 1607 as in force today (including any amendments) within the United Kingdom, from legislation.gov.uk.

The Theft Act 1607 (c. 6) is an Act of the Parliament of Scotland.

== Title ==
"Act Anent woddis parkis planting dowcattis et cetera " (An Act concerning woods, parks, planting, doocots, etc.)

== Content ==
The act was subject to six separate repeals of words by section 1 of, and Schedule 1 to, the Statute Law Revision (Scotland) Act 1964 (c. 80). Its form prior to those repeals was:

Oure Souerane Lord and Estaittis of this present parliament [Considering how woods, parks and all sort of planting and fencing decay within this realm, and how dovecots are broken, bees stolen, men's proper lochs and ponds despoiled of fish, to the great hurt and prejudice of the country and decay of policy, therefore ratify and approve all acts of parliament made of before for conservation of planting and policy and against breakers of dovecots, stealing of bees and of fishes out of men's ponds and proper lochs in the whole points, articles and clauses thereof, and ordain the same to be put to execution against the contraveners thereof. And further, the saidis Estaittis] Statutis and Ordinis that quha-soeuir [shall be fundin hereafter to break down his neighbours' woods and park dykes, fences, ponds or enclosures to pasture within the said fences, cut trees, broom or shear grass within the same, or brakis dowcattis] Steillis Beis and fisches in propir stankis and loches Shall be callit and convenit thairfoir as a braker of the Law ather befoir the privie counsall or ony vther ordinar magistrat within this realme at the optioun of the pairtie complenar And the penaltie to be Imposit and takin of the Controvenaris befoir the saidis ordinar Inferiour Judges Auchtnocht to exceid the sowme of fourtie pundis of this Realme [And the secrete counsaill to impose such penalties against the contraveners of this present act as after trial taken in the cause they shall find the offender to merit and deserve, without prejudice always of putting of all former acts made regarding the premises to execution after the form and tenor thereof.]

The 1964 act repealed the following words, with effect from 31 July 1964:

The words from "Considering" to "saidis Estaittis", the words from "shall be fundin" to "brakis dowcattis", the word "ather", the words "the privie counsall or", the word "vther", the words "at the optioun of the pairtie complenar", and the words from "And the secrete counsaill" to the end.

Following the repeals, and until 2002, the act looked like this:

Oure Souerane Lord and Estaittis of this present parliament . . . Statutis and Ordinis that quha-soeuir . . . Steillis Beis and fisches in propir stankis and loches Shall be callit and convenit thairfoir as a braker of the Law . . . befoir . . . ony . . . ordinar magistrat within this realme . . . And the penaltie to be Imposit and takin of the Controvenaris befoir the saidis ordinar Inferiour Judges Auchtnocht to exceid the sowme of fourtie pundis of this Realme.

Our sovereign Lord and estates of this present parliament ... statutise and ordain that whosoever ... steals bees, or fishes in private ponds and lochs, shall be called and confined therefor as a breaker of the law ... before ... any ... ordinary magistrate within this realm ... and the penalty to be imposed and taken of the controveners before the said ordinary inferior judges ought not to exceed the sum of £40 of this realm.

== Subseqeunt developments ==
The act was amended by the Salmon and Freshwater Fisheries (Consolidation) (Scotland) Act 2003 which removed the words "and fisches in propir stankis and loches" thus leaving only bees ("Beis") as the subjects of this act.
