= List of acts of the Parliament of Scotland from 1607 =

This is a list of acts of the Parliament of Scotland for the year 1607.

It lists acts of Parliament of the old Parliament of Scotland, that was merged with the old Parliament of England to form the Parliament of Great Britain, by the Union with England Act 1707 (c. 7).

For other years, see list of acts of the Parliament of Scotland. For the period after 1707, see list of acts of the Parliament of Great Britain.

== 1607 ==
The 19th parliament of James VI, held in Edinburgh from 18 March 1608.

Short title, or popular name	Citation	Royal assent
Long title
Union with England Act 1607 (repealed)	1607 c. 1 (Note: This is the citation in the Record Edition.) — (Note: This act is not listed in the Duodecimal Edition.)	11 August 1607
Act anent the Unioun of Scotland and England. Act about the Union of Scotland and England. (Repealed by Statute Law Revision (Scotland) Act 1906 (6 Edw. 7. c. 38))
Mass Act 1607 (repealed)	1607 c. 2; 1607 c. 1 (Note: This is the citation in the Duodecimal Edition.)	11 August 1607
Act aganis the sayaris and wilfull heiraris of mess. (Repealed by Statute Law Revision (Scotland) Act 1906 (6 Edw. 7. c. 38))
Not public and general	1607 c. 3; 1607 c. 8	11 August 1607
Act anent the chaptour of Sanctandrous.
Not public and general	1607 c. 4 —	11 August 1607
Act anent the annexatioun of the kirk of Mekgill to the bischoprik of Dunkeld.
Erection of Kirks Act 1607 (repealed)	1607 c. 5 —	11 August 1607
Act anent the kingis blensche dueteis in erectionis and ministeris stipendis of the kirkis erectit. (Repealed by Statute Law Revision (Scotland) Act 1906 (6 Edw. 7. c. 38))
Theft Act 1607 still in force	1607 c. 6; 1607 c. 3	11 August 1607
Act Anent woddis parkis planting dowcattis et cetera.
Weights and Measures Act 1607 (repealed)	1607 c. 7; 1607 c. 2	11 August 1607
Act anent weichtis and mesouris. (Repealed by Statute Law Revision (Scotland) Act 1906 (6 Edw. 7. c. 38))
Craftsmen Act 1607 (repealed)	1607 c. 8; 1607 c. 4	11 August 1607
Ratificatioun of the Act anent conduceing of craftismen. (Repealed by Statute Law Revision (Scotland) Act 1906 (6 Edw. 7. c. 38))
Education Act 1607 (repealed)	1607 c. 9 —	11 August 1607
Commissioun anent grammer and teacheris thairof. (Repealed by Statute Law Revision (Scotland) Act 1906 (6 Edw. 7. c. 38))
Not public and general	1607 c. 10; 1607 c. 7	11 August 1607
Act anent the burgh of Stenhyve in the Mernis.
Not public and general	1607 c. 11 —	11 August 1607
Act in favouris of the Quenis Majestie anent the ratificatioun of hir infeftment of Dunfermeling.
Royal Burghs Act 1607 (repealed)	1607 c. 12; 1607 c. 5	11 August 1607
Act in favouris of the burrowis regall. Act in favour of the royal burghs. (Repealed by Statute Law Revision (Scotland) Act 1906 (6 Edw. 7. c. 38))
Convention of Burghs Act 1607 (repealed)	1607 c. 13; 1607 c. 6	11 August 1607
Act in fauouris of the frie burrowis Regall aganis vnfremen. (Repealed by Debtors (Scotland) Act 1987 (c. 18))
Not public and general	1607 c. 14 —	11 August 1607
Act in favouris of the burgh of Craill.
Not public and general	1607 c. 15 —	11 August 1607
Act in favouris of the towne of Dunbar tane anent ane taxatioun thairto.
Regiam Majestatem Act 1607 (repealed)	1607 c. 16 —	11 August 1607
Act in favouris of the Clerk of Register anent the prenting of the book callit Regiam Majestatem. (Repealed by Statute Law Revision (Scotland) Act 1906 (6 Edw. 7. c. 38))
Not public and general	1607 c. 17 —	11 August 1607
Act in favouris of the erle of Argyle of tuentie chalderis victuall of the fewfermis of Kintyre.
Not public and general	1607 c. 18 —	11 August 1607
Act in favouris of the erle of Murray.
Not public and general	1607 c. 19 —	11 August 1607
Ratificatioun in favouris of Sir Williame Seytonis twa sonnes of thair twa letteris of pensioun.
Not public and general	1607 c. 20 —	11 August 1607
Act in favouris of James Durhame anent the change of ane gaitte.
Not public and general	1607 c. 27 —	11 August 1607
Ratificatioun in favouris of Mr Alexander Craig of his pensioun of sex hundreth merkis.
Not public and general	1607 c. 22 —	11 August 1607
Ratificatioun in favouris of Johne Strang of his infeftment of Kilranny.
Not public and general	1607 c. 23 —	11 August 1607
Ratificatioun in favouris of Thomas Peirsoun.
Not public and general	1607 c. 24 —	11 August 1607
Act in favouris of the universitie of Sanctandrous.
Not public and general	1607 c. 25 —	11 August 1607
Ratificatioun to Mr George Young and James Prymrose of thair pensiounes.
Not public and general	1607 c. 26 —	11 August 1607
Ratificatioun to James Hammyltoun of his pensioun.
Not public and general	1607 c. 27 —	11 August 1607
Ratificatioun to Adam Couper of his in feftment of Gogar.
Saving the Rights Act 1607 Not public and general	1607 c. 28; 1607 c. 9	11 August 1607
Act anent Salvo Jure cujuslibet.
Not public and general	1607 c. 29 —	11 August 1607
Ratificatioun in favouris of Sir Thomas Hammyltoun of Bynnie knycht advocatt to our soverane lord.
Not public and general	1607 c. 30 —	11 August 1607
Act in favouris of the erle of Orknay.
Not public and general	1607 c. 31 —	11 August 1607
Commissioun anent the brig of Cramound.
Not public and general	1607 c. 32 —	11 August 1607
Erectioun of Kelso in favouris of lord Roxburgh.
Not public and general	1607 c. 33 —	11 August 1607
Act in favouris of the laird of Ruthvenis.
Not public and general	1607 c. 34 —	11 August 1607
Ratificatioun in favouris of the laird of Balcarres.
Not public and general	1607 c. 35 —	11 August 1607
Act in favouris of the erle of Errole.

=== Sources ===
- Alexander, William (1841). "Acta Parliamentorum Regis Jacobi Sexti". An Abridgement of the Acts of the Parliaments of Scotland. Edinburgh: Adam and Charles Black. p. A40 – via Google Books.
- Alexander, William (1841). "Acta Parliamentorum Regis Jacobi Sexti". An Abridgement of the Acts of the Parliaments of Scotland. Edinburgh: Adam and Charles Black. p. A40 – via Google Books.
- Chronological Table of the Statutes. London: Her Majesty's Stationery Office. 1972. p. 1346 – via Google Books.
- "Acts of the Old Scottish Parliament: 1607". legislation.gov.uk. The National Archives.
- "Index of Statutes: Index of Statutes: James VI (1567-1625)". Records of the Parliaments of Scotland to 1707. University of St Andrews.

== See also ==
- List of legislation in the United Kingdom
- Records of the Parliaments of Scotland
