= Scottish Law Commission =

Non-departmental public body

- Scottish Law Commission logo

Agency overview
- Formed: 1965; 61 years ago
- Type: advisory non-departmental public body
- Jurisdiction: Scotland
- Headquarters: Parliament House, 11 Parliament Square, Edinburgh EH1 1RQ
- Motto: "Promoting law reform"
- Minister responsible: Neil Gray MSP, Cabinet Secretary for Justice
- Agency executive: The Hon Lord Sandison, Chair; Chief Executive - to be appointed
- Parent department: Justice Directorate of the Scottish Government
- Key document: Law Commissions Act 1965
- Website: www.scotlawcom.gov.uk

Map
- Scotland in the UK and Europe

The Scottish Law Commission (Scottish Gaelic: Coimisean Lagh na h-Alba) is an advisory non-departmental public body of the Scottish Government. It was established in 1965 to keep Scots law under review and recommend necessary reforms to improve, simplify and update the country's legal system. It was established by the Law Commissions Act 1965 (as amended) at the same time as the Law Commission in England and Wales.

Appointments are ordinarily made in accordance with the Commissioner for Public Appointments in Scotland's Code of Practice.

The commission is part of the Commonwealth Association of Law Reform Agencies.

== Functions ==
The Commission exists to keep Scots law under review and recommend reform as needed. The commission's scope encompasses devolved and reserved matters, as defined by the Scotland Act 1998 and as such has a duty for laws that are the responsibility of the Parliament of the United Kingdom, as well as those that are the responsibility of the Scottish Parliament.

== Composition ==
The commission consists of five commissioners appointed by the Scottish Ministers. One of the commissioners is the chairman who by convention is a Senator of the College of Justice. The other commissioners are drawn from those holding judicial office, advocates, solicitors or university law teachers. Commissioners are appointed for a maximum term of five years with the possibility of re-appointment. The current commissioners are as follows:

1. Lord Sandison
2. Professor Gillian Black
3. Roisin Higgins KC
4. Professor Frankie McCarthy
5. Ann Stewart

The commissioners are supported by the chief executive of the commission, Rachel Rayner, and by legal and non-legal staff. All permanent staff are seconded from the Scottish government.

== Chairs ==
The current and past Chairs are as follows:

- Lord Sandison (2026)
- Lady Paton (2019–2025)
- Lord Pentland (2014–2018)
- Lady Clark (2012–2013)
- Lord Drummond Young (2007–2011)
- Lord Eassie (2002–2006)
- Lord Gill (1996–2001)
- Lord Davidson (1988–1996)
- Lord Maxwell (1981–1988)
- Lord Hunter (1971–1981)
- Lord Kilbrandon (1965–1971)

== See also ==
- Law Commission (England and Wales)
- Northern Ireland Law Commission
