= S. J. Mukhopadhaya =

Indian judge (born 1950)

Hon'ble Justice (Retd.) Sudhanshu Jyoti Mukhopadhaya
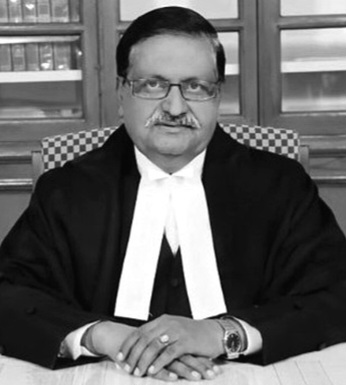

1st Chaiperson of National Company Law Appellate Tribunal
- In office 1 June 2016 – 14 March 2020
- Appointed by: Pranab Mukherjee
- Preceded by: Position established
- Succeeded by: Bansi Lal Bhat (acting)

Judge of Supreme Court of India
- In office 13 September 2011 – 14 March 2015
- Nominated by: S. H. Kapadia
- Appointed by: Pratibha Patil

22nd Chief Justice of Gujarat High Court
- In office 9 December 2009 – 12 September 2011
- Nominated by: K. G. Balakrishnan
- Appointed by: Pratibha Patil
- Preceded by: K. S. P. Radhakrishnan; M. S. Shah (acting)
- Succeeded by: Bhaskar Bhattacharya

Judge of Madras High Court
- In office 31 August 2006 – 8 December 2009
- Nominated by: Y. K. Sabharwal
- Appointed by: A. P. J. Abdul Kalam
- Acting Chief Justice
- In office 16 December 2008 – 8 March 2009
- Appointed by: Pratibha Patil
- Preceded by: A. K. Ganguly
- Succeeded by: H. L. Gokhale
- In office 10 May 2008 – 18 May 2008
- Appointed by: Pratibha Patil
- Preceded by: A. P. Shah
- Succeeded by: A. K. Ganguly

Judge of Jharkhand High Court
- In office 15 November 2000 – 30 August 2006
- Appointed by: K. R. Narayanan
- Acting Chief Justice
- In office 27 August 2004 – 28 February 2005
- Appointed by: A. P. J. Abdul Kalam
- Preceded by: P. K. Balasubramanyan
- Succeeded by: Altamas Kabir
- In office 9 September 2005 – 3 December 2005
- Appointed by: A. P. J. Abdul Kalam
- Preceded by: Altamas Kabir
- Succeeded by: Nelavoy Dhinakar
- In office 10 June 2006 – 30 August 2006
- Appointed by: A. P. J. Abdul Kalam
- Preceded by: Nelavoy Dhinakar
- Succeeded by: M. Karpaga Vinayagam

Judge of Patna High Court
- In office 8 November 1994 – 14 November 2000
- Nominated by: M. N. Venkatachaliah
- Appointed by: S. D. Sharma

Personal details
- Born: 15 March 1950 (age 76)
- Parent: Sarojendu Mukherjee
- Education: B.Sc and LL.B
- Alma mater: Magadh University, Patna University

Sudhansu Jyoti Mukhopadhaya (15 March 1950) is a former justice of the Supreme Court of India. He was also chair of the National Company Law Appellate Tribunal from 1 June 2016 to 14 March 2020. He previously served as Chief Justice of Gujarat High Court and as acting Chief Justice at the Jharkhand High Court and Madras High Court.

== Early life and career ==
Justice Mukhopadhaya was born on 15 March 1950 to late Sarojendu Mukherjee, who was a leading practitioner especially Constitutional and in Service law in the High Court of Patna. He passed the B.Sc. examination in 1971 from Magadh University and obtained his LL. B Degree in 1979 from the University of Patna. He enrolled as an Advocate on 18 May 1979 and started practicing law at the Patna and Ranchi Benches of the High Court of Patna in Constitutional, Service, Civil and Criminal matters. He was designated as Senior Advocate in February, 1993.

He was appointed as permanent Judge of the Patna High Court on 8 November 1994. He was transferred to Jharkhand High Court upon its creation on 15 November 2000 where he also served as the Acting Chief Justice for about a year and three months. He was transferred to Madras High Court and joined as the first Puisne judge in the High Court on 31 August 2006. Here also he functioned as the Acting Chief Justice for about five months.

Thereafter he was elevated as Chief Justice of Gujarat High Court on 8 December 2009 and served as such until his elevation as judge of the Supreme Court of India on 13 September 2011. He retired from Supreme Court on 14 March 2015.

Post retirement, he has been appointed as the first Chairperson of National Company Law Appellate Tribunal on 1 June 2016. In his capacity as the Chairperson, he has delivered judgments explaining different provisions of newly enacted Insolvency and Bankruptcy Code, 2016 on which there was no precedent.

== Notable judgements ==
=== Suresh Kumar Koushal v. Naz Foundation ===
A Supreme Court bench of justice G. S. Singhvi and Justice SJ Mukhopadhaya has upheld the Section 377 of India's penal code bans "sex against the order of nature", which is widely interpreted to mean homosexual sex. The judges stated that "a minuscule fraction of the country's population constitutes lesbians, gays, bisexuals or transgenders" and that the High Court had erroneously relied upon international precedents "in its anxiety to protect the so-called rights of LGBT persons". The United Nations human rights chief Navi Pillay voiced her disappointment at the re-criminalization of consensual same-sex relationships in India, calling it "a significant step backwards" for the country and Secretary-General of the United Nations Ban Ki-moon stressed the need for equality and opposed any discrimination against lesbians, gays and bisexuals. The decision is widely believed to be one of the lowest points of Indian Supreme Court jurisprudence.

In the Puttaswamy v. Union Of India case, the 9-judge bench commented on the verdict that the size of the population should have no barring on the protection of fundamental rights. The bench commented that the "so-called rights" implies an illusion, but the claims were grounded in the constitution. Subsequently, the judgement was overturned by a 5-judge constitutional bench on 6 September 2018 in Navtej Singh Johar v. Union of India.

In Lily Thomas v. Union of India a two-judge bench of Justice A. K. Patnaik and Justice Mukhopadhaya on 10 July 2013 ruled that any Member of Parliament (MP), Member of the Legislative Assembly (MLA) or Member of a Legislative Council (MLC) who is convicted of a crime and given a minimum of two years' imprisonment, loses membership of the House with immediate effect. This is in contrast to the earlier position, wherein convicted members held on to their seats until they exhausted all judicial remedy in lower court, High Court and the Supreme Court of India. Further, Section 8(4) of the Representation of the People Act, which allowed elected representatives three months to appeal their conviction, was declared unconstitutional.
