= Nelavoy Dhinakar =

4th Chief Justice of Jharkhand High Court

Hon'ble Chief Justice (Retd.) Nelavoy Dhinakar

4th Chief Justice of Jharkhand High Court
- In office 4 December 2005 – 9 June 2006
- Nominated by: Y. K. Sabharwal
- Appointed by: A. P. J. Abdul Kalam
- Preceded by: Altamas Kabir; S. J. Mukhopadhaya (acting)
- Succeeded by: M. Karpaga Vinayagam; S. J. Mukhopadhaya (acting); M. Y. Eqbal (acting)

Judge of Madras High Court
- In office 5 March 1999 – 3 December 2005
- Nominated by: A. S. Anand
- Appointed by: K. R. Narayanan
- Acting Chief Justice
- In office 11 October 2005 – 11 November 2005
- Appointed by: A. P. J. Abdul Kalam
- Preceded by: Markandey Katju
- Succeeded by: Ajit Prakash Shah
- In office 21 November 2004 – 27 November 2004
- Appointed by: A. P. J. Abdul Kalam
- Preceded by: B. Subhashan Reddy
- Succeeded by: Markandey Katju

Judge of Kerala High Court
- In office 30 November 1994 – 4 March 1999
- Nominated by: A. M. Ahmadi
- Appointed by: S. D. Sharma

Judge of Madras High Court
- In office 17 October 1994 – 29 November 1994
- Nominated by: M. N. Venkatachaliah
- Appointed by: S. D. Sharma

Personal details
- Born: 10 June 1944 (age 82)
- Education: B.A. and LL.B

Nelavoy Dhinakar (born 10 June 1944) is a retired Indian judge who served as the 4th Chief Justice of Jharkhand High Court from 4 December 2005 to 9 June 2006. He also served as judge in the Madras and Kerala High Courts

== Education ==
Dhinakar was born on 10 June 1944. He passed B.A., B.L. and was enrolled as an advocate on 31 January 1968. Dhinakar practised in the Madras High Court on criminal and constitutional matters. He was appointed additional public prosecutor, special public prosecutor and Government advocate in the High Court in 1977.

== Career ==
On 17 October 1994 Dhinakar became permanent judge of the Madras High Court. On 30 November 1994 he was transferred to the Kerala High Court thereafter back to the Madras High Court on 5 March 1999. He also performed as the acting Chief Justice of this High Court twice in 2004 and in 2005. On 4 December 2005 he was appointed the Chief Justice of the Jharkhand High Court after Justice Altamas Kabir. Justice Dhinakar retired on 10 June 2006. He was the Chairperson of Kerala State Human Rights Commission from 2006 to 2011.
