= M. Y. Eqbal =

Indian judge (1951–2021)

Hon'ble Justice Mokhtarajma Yusuf Eqbal
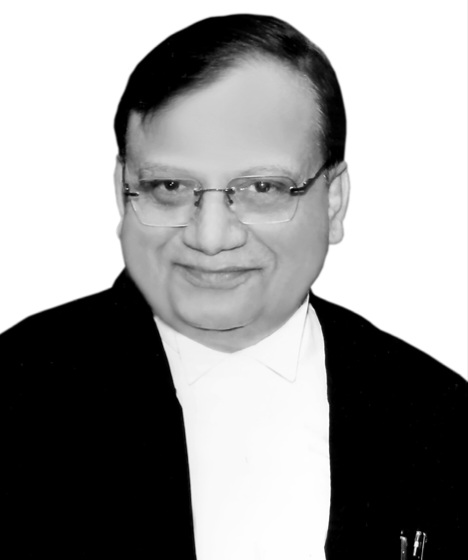

Judge of Supreme Court of India
- In office 24 December 2012 – 12 February 2016
- Nominated by: Altamas Kabir
- Appointed by: Pranab Mukherjee

36th Chief Justice of Madras High Court
- In office 11 June 2010 – 23 December 2012
- Nominated by: S. H. Kapadia
- Appointed by: Pratibha Patil
- Preceded by: H. L. Gokhale; Elipe Dharma Rao (acting)
- Succeeded by: R. K. Agrawal; Elipe Dharma Rao (acting)

Judge of Jharkhand High Court
- In office 15 November 2000 – 10 June 2010
- Appointed by: K. R. Narayanan
- Acting Chief Justice
- In office 1 May 2010 – 10 June 2010
- Appointed by: Pratibha Patil
- Preceded by: Gyan Sudha Misra
- Succeeded by: Bhagwati Prasad; Sushil Harkauli (acting)
- In office 16 May 2008 – 12 July 2008
- Appointed by: Pratibha Patil
- Preceded by: M. Karpaga Vinayagam
- Succeeded by: Gyan Sudha Misra
- In office 29 August 2006 – 16 September 2006
- Appointed by: A. P. J. Abdul Kalam
- Preceded by: Nelavoy Dhinakar; S. J. Mukhopadhaya (acting)
- Succeeded by: M. Karpaga Vinayagam

Judge of Patna High Court
- In office 9 May 1996 – 14 November 2000
- Nominated by: A. M. Ahmadi
- Appointed by: S. D. Sharma

Personal details
- Born: 13 February 1951
- Died: 7 May 2021 (aged 70) Gurgaon, Haryana, India
- Education: B.Sc and LL.B
- Alma mater: Ranchi University

Mokhtarajma Yusuf Eqbal (13 February 1951 – 7 May 2021) was an Indian judge, who served as a Judge of the Supreme Court of India. He also served as Chief Justice of the Madras High Court. He retired in February 2016.

== Early life and education ==
He was born on 13 February 1951, passed B.Sc. examination from Ranchi University in 1970 and obtained LL.B. degree with Distinction (Gold Medalist) in 1974.

== Career ==
Enrolled as an Advocate in 1975 and initially practised exclusively on the civil side, in civil courts at Ranchi, he shifted his practice to the Ranchi Bench of the Patna High Court in 1986 and became Government Pleader in the Ranchi Bench of Patna High Court in 1990.

In 1993 he became Government Advocate in the High Court. In these periods he practised in civil, criminal, constitutional and tax matters. He also worked as retained Counsel and Legal Adviser of almost all the Banks, Insurance Company, Electricity Board, Housing Board, university and other Government and semi Government Undertakings. Appointed permanent Judge of the Patna High Court on 9 May 1996, by Notification dated 14 November 2000 he became the Judge of the Jharkhand High Court where he also served as acting chief justice thrice in 2006, 2008 and 2010 respectively.

He was the chief justice of the Madras High Court from 11 June 2010 to 21 December 2012 and elevated as Judge of Supreme Court of India on 24 December 2012.

His brother is also a judge in the Ranchi Lower Court.

== Death ==
Eqbal died from COVID-19 in May 2021, at the Medanta Hospital in the city of Gurgaon.
