= Sigma Huda =

Bangladeshi lawyer and politician (1944/1945–2024

- সিগমা হুদা
- Born: Sigma Kabir; 1944/1945; Bengal Province, British India
- Died: 17 July 2024 (aged 79); Dhaka, Bangladesh
- Occupation: Lawyer
- Spouse: Nazmul Huda
- Father: Akbar Kabir
- Relatives: Khushi Kabir (sister); Selim Kabir (brother)

Sigma Huda (née Kabir; 1944/1945 – 17 July 2024) was a Bangladeshi lawyer. She was the founding president of Bangladesh Women Lawyers Association (BNWLA) and founder and secretary of Institute for Law and Development (ILD).

In 2007, she was awarded Pope John Paul II Wellspring of Freedom Award for dedicating her life to upholding human rights and combating injustice. Her late husband, Nazmul Huda, was a former Bangladesh Nationalist Party government minister and barrister.

== Early life ==
Huda's father was Alamgir M. A. Kabir and mother was Tahera Kabir, daughter of Khwaja Shahabuddin. Her sister's were Alpha, and Khushi Kabir. She had one brother Babar Kabir. Her uncles were Humayun Kabir and Jehangir Kabir.

== Career ==
Huda was the lawyer of Anup Chetia alias Golap Barua, a leader of ULFA who filed for asylum in Bangladesh.

== Activism ==
From 2004, Huda served as United Nations special rapporteur on human trafficking. She was known for her views on prostitution. In her report for the United Nations Commission on Human Rights, she said:

"The act of prostitution, by definition, joins together two forms of social power (sex and money) in one interaction. In both realms (sexuality and economics), men hold substantial and systematic power over women. In prostitution, these power disparities merge in an act which both assigns and re-affirms the dominant social status of men over the subordinated social status of women."

"The demand for commercial sex is often further grounded in social power disparities of race, nationality, caste, and colour."

== Charges and convictions ==
In 2007, Huda was brought before a Bangladeshi court on bribery charges filed by the Anti-Corruption Commission, whereupon she was sentenced to three years imprisonment as an accomplice to a bribe in the amount of Taka 2.40 crore (approximately US$400,000) for which her husband was convicted of abuse of power and corruption.

The UN Special Rapporteur on the independence of the judges and lawyers issued a statement on 2 September 2007, expressing concern that Huda had not been given a fair trial. He said it received reports indicating that the right to legal representation and the independence of the court had been severely affected during her trial. "Defense lawyers felt pressured, they had no opportunity to visit her in prison, and could only meet with her at the end of the hearings. They also had difficulties accessing the case files and other relevant information, thus compromising their ability to ensure an adequate defence."

== Personal life and death ==
Huda was married to barrister Nazmul Huda, a former Bangladesh Nationalist Party minister, former leader of Bangladesh Nationalist Front (BNF), National Alliance (NA), and leader of Bangladesh Manabadhikar Party (BMP) until his death. They had two daughters, Antara Selima Huda and Srabanti Amina Huda. They are lawyers in profession. Huda's sister, Khushi Kabir, is a social activist and her brother was Selim Kabir.

Huda died in Dhaka on 17 July 2024, at the age of 79.
