= Akbar Kabir =

Bangladeshi social worker

- আকবর কবির

Adviser for Information and Broadcasting
- In office 18 September 1976 – 12 October 1977
- President: ASM Sayem; Ziaur Rahman (acting)
- Preceded by: Ziaur Rahman
- Succeeded by: Shamsul Huda Chaudhury

Personal details
- Born: January 5, 1915 Faridpur, Bengal Presidency, British India
- Died: October 17, 2002 (aged 87) Dhaka, Bangladesh
- Resting place: Faridpur, Bangladesh
- Children: Khushi Kabir; Sigma Huda; Selim Kabir
- Education: Calcutta University

Akber Kabir (5 January 1915-17 October 2002) was a Bangladeshi social worker and an adviser for the information ministry in the advisory council of presidents Abu Sadat Mohammad Sayem and Major General Ziaur Rahman from September 1976 to October 1977. He was also the brother of former Indian Bengali education minister Humayun Kabir and Congress politician Jehangir Kabir as well as the father-in-law of renowned Bangladeshi barrister Nazmul Huda, who has also served in the Ministry of Information during former prime minister Khaleda Zia's first ministry.

== Education ==
Kabir completed his M.A. from the University of Calcutta in 1935.

== Personal life ==
Kabir was born on 5 January 1915 in Kamarpur upazilla of Faridpur, Bengal Presidency. He had three sons Dara Kabir, Selim Kabir, and Babar Kabir and three daughters, Alpha Ali, famous Bangladeshi lawyer and founding president of Bangladesh Women Lawyers Association (BNWLA) Sigma Huda and social activist and CEO of economic empowerment NGO Nijera Kori Khushi Kabir. He also had two granddaughters through Sigma, Antara Selima Huda and Srabanti Amina Huda.

== Death ==
He died at 10.30 pm BST on Thursday, 17 October 2002 due to old age at the age of 87. He was buried in his family graveyard in Faridpur following Friday prayers the next day.
