= Human DNA Profiling Bill =

The DNA Based Technology (Use and Regulation) Bill, 2017 or the Human DNA Profiling Bill is a proposed legislation in India. The bill will allow the government to establish a National DNA Data Bank and a DNA Profiling Board, and use the data for various specified forensic purposes. The bill has raised concerns of privacy among citizen rights groups. The bill was expected to be presented in the parliament in the monsoon session of 2015.

== History ==
The bill was originally proposed in 2007 and in 2012 drafting of the bill began. The draft bill was prepared by the Department of Biotechnology. The bill proposes to form a National DNA Data Bank and a DNA Profiling Board, and use the data for various specified purposes.

The proposed DNA Profiling Board will consist of molecular biology, human genetics, population biology, bioethics, social sciences, law and criminal justice experts. The Board will define standards and controls for DNA profiling. It will also certify labs and handle access of the data by law enforcement agencies. There will be similar bodies at state levels.

The bill will also create a National DNA Data Bank, which will collect data from offenders, suspects, missing persons, unidentified dead bodies and volunteers. It will profile and store DNA data in criminal cases like homicide, sexual assault, and other crimes. The data will be restricted and will be available only to the accused or the suspect. A person facing imprisonment or death sentence can send a request for DNA profiling of related evidence to the court that convicted him.

The bill has the provision that any misuse of data will carry a punishment of up to three years imprisonment and also fine.

== Criticism and support ==
The bill has been criticised for not addressing the concerns of privacy. The Citizens Forum for Civil Liberties has opposed the bill on privacy concerns and sent a complaint to the National Human Rights Commission of India in 2012.

=== A. P. Shah committee report ===
In October 2012, an expert committee headed by Ajit Prakash Shah presented its report. It said that there should be safeguards to prevent illegal collection and use of DNA data. There should be also safeguards to prevent the proposed body from misusing them. The report also suggested that there should a mechanism using which citizens can appeal against the retention of data. There should also be a mechanism of appeal under which citizens under trial can request a second sample to be taken. The samples must be taken after consent in case of victims and suspects. However, samples can also be taken from crime scenes. The committee noted that although the bill allows volunteers to submit samples, there is no proper procedure to obtain consent and there is no mechanism under which volunteer can withdraw their data. The committee proposed that before giving the data to a third party, the person must be notified and consent must be sought, if the third party is not an authorised agency. The report said that purpose for which data is being collected should be state publicly, and the data should be destroyed after the purpose has been served and the time frame has expired. The report said bodies collecting, analysing and storing DNA data should be made to release an annual report, detailing their practices and organisational structure.

=== Lokniti Foundation vs Union of India (Writ Petition (Civil) No.491/2012 Judgement on 1 May, 2018) ===
In 2012, a non-government organization (NGO) called Lokniti Foundation filed a public interest litigation against the government in the Supreme Court of India, Writ Petition (Civil) No.491 of 2012, stating that India does not have a national DNA database to address the issue of thousands of unclaimed dead bodies in India that are reported annually. The Supreme Court asked the government to present a roadmap detailing how the bill will implement mandatory DNA profiling of unclaimed bodies.

The government replied to concern by stating that the bill will establish a national database which will help identify unclaimed bodies, and returned rescued children and adults to their families. The database would store DNA profiles from the relatives of missing persons, and also from convicts, accused and volunteers.

The government also added in the affidavit that India also lacks trained personnel to implement it It has also been stated that the Centre for DNA Fingerprinting and Diagnostics, Hyderabad, India was in the process of acquiring specialized software from the Federal Bureau of Investigation (FBI), USA for cross matching of DNA profiling data. India has 30-40 DNA examiners and a DNA examiner can handle 100 cases per year. However, India gets 40,000 unclaimed bodies annually, the purpose will require at least 400 DNA examiners. Since, a single case requires ₹20,000, annually ₹80 crore will be required for 40,000 cases, excluding salaries of the examiners and support personnel.

The government also said that the final bill will be presented in March 2015. It has been halted due to privacy concerns raised by some NGOs and expert committee set up by the Department of Biotechnology is addressing them.

== See also ==
- DNA profiling
- DNA database
- Unique Identification Authority of India
