= Gyan Sudha Misra =

Indian judge (born 1949)

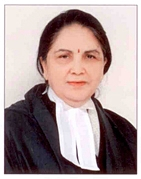

Judge of Supreme Court of India
- In office 30 April 2010 – 27 April 2014
- Nominated by: K. G. Balakrishnan
- Appointed by: Pratibha Patil

6th Chief Justice of Jharkhand High Court
- In office 13 July 2008 – 30 April 2010
- Nominated by: K. G. Balakrishnan
- Appointed by: Pratibha Patil
- Preceded by: M. Karpaga Vinayagam; M. Y. Eqbal (acting)
- Succeeded by: Bhagwati Prasad; M. Y. Eqbal (acting); Sushil Harkauli (acting)

Judge of Rajasthan High Court
- In office 21 April 1994 – 12 July 2008
- Nominated by: M. N. Venkatachaliah
- Appointed by: Shankar Dayal Sharma

Judge of Patna High Court
- In office 16 March 1994 – 20 April 1994
- Nominated by: M. N. Venkatachaliah
- Appointed by: Shankar Dayal Sharma

Personal details
- Born: 28 April 1949 (age 77)
- Parent: Satish Chandra Mishra
- Education: LL.B
- Alma mater: Patna University

Gyan Sudha Misra (born 28 April 1949) is a former judge of the Supreme Court of India and former chief justice of Jharkhand High Court. She is also former judge of the high courts of Rajasthan and Patna.

== Early life and career ==
She was born on 28 April 1949 in the family of lawyers, her father Satish Chandra Mishra was the chief justice of the Patna High Court during late 1960s. She was graduated in law from Patna University and enrolled as advocate with Bar Council of Bihar in November 1972. She started practising in Supreme Court of India in 1973 and handled cases of several high courts. She became government advocate for the state of Bihar in 1982. As a government advocate she represented state of Bihar in Bhagalpur blindings case.

In recognition of her services and standing as a lawyer for more than 21 years she was appointed a Judge of the Patna High Court in the State of Bihar on 16 March 1994 but soon thereafter was transferred to the High Court of Rajasthan State in view of the then prevailing transfer policy of judges in the Indian Judiciary.

Prior to her appointment as a judge, Misra was also actively associated with the activities of the lawyers and the legal profession and hence was elected as a Treasurer, Joint Secretary, and Member Executive Committee of the Supreme Court Bar Association, several times, which is the premier association of lawyers in the country.

== As judge ==
=== In High Court ===
While functioning as a judge in the Rajasthan High Court, she held several important assignments as company judge, judge for arbitration matters, constitutional matters and was also appointed and continued as chairman of the advisory board constituted under the National Security Act. She also chaired as a member of the selection committee constituted for the appointment of civil judge (junior and senior division). She was later appointed executive chairman of the Rajasthan State Legal Services Authority, which is a statutory body assigned with the duty of administering legal aid and assistance to the disadvantaged sections of society and also for taking effective and statutory steps for reduction of arrears in the state judiciary. In this capacity, she also worked effectively for checking the social problems which included the effective implementation of measures for checking the incidence of child marriages, female foeticide, exploitation of women and children in various forms, and a large number of such other social atrocities.

Misra had also been invited to participate in the South Asian Conference on the invitation of the UNICEF held at Kathmandu (Nepal) on the subject of "Ending Violence against the Women and Children". In 1998 she also represented India, as a guest speaker, in the Conference of the International Association of Women Judges held at Ottawa in Canada where a variety of issues relating to women and children in the world at large were the subject matter of discussion and deliberations.

==== Chief Justice of Jharkhand High Court ====
After 14 years of successful tenure as a judge of the Rajasthan High Court, Misra was elevated as chief justice of the Jharkhand High Court at Ranchi in the State of Jharkhand on 13 July 2008 and functioned in that capacity till 29 April 2010.

As chief justice of the Jharkhand High Court, while hearing PIL matters, Misra passed a large number of prominent and effective orders, which resulted in the initiation of a probe by the Enforcement Directorate against eminent persons involving significant financial implications. In one of the PIL matters while relying upon the judgment of the Supreme Court in the case of St. Mary's School, New Delhi vs Election Commission of India, the bench presided over by Misra ruled that the school building and the school buses would not be utilized during the elections on any working day as it upsets the routine studies and also hinders the school's administrative work. Treating a letter from Tapasi Choudhary to be a PIL relating to the sensitive matter of the mysterious death of her daughter Mousami Choudhary, a trainee air hostess of AHA Airhostess Training Institute, Jamshedpur at Hotel Sonnet of Jamshedpur, Misra sitting in a division bench with justice D.K. Sinha directed a CBI probe into the matter and for filing charge-sheet.

As chief justice of the Jharkhand High Court, Misra was invited to be a member of the Indian delegation, headed by the Chief Justice of India along with other judges, which visited Australia to participate in the Conference for "Protecting Rights and Promoting Access to Justice" project held between 18 and 27 September 2009.

While working as a judge, Misra has demonstrated through her judgments and orders that she is a strong believer in the principle that social justice, which is one of the objectives of the Indian Constitution certainly helps us in bringing about a just society by removing imbalances in social, educational, economic and political life of the people and protecting the rights of the weak, aged, destitute, women, children and other under-privileged persons of the state against the ruthless treatment which is enshrined in the preamble to the constitution.

=== In Supreme Court ===
Elevated to the Supreme Court of India on 30 April 2010, Misra authored several landmarks and notable judgments in the Supreme Court of India, including judgments on conflict of interest in the Srinivasan-BCCI matter, landmark euthanasia judgment - Aruna Shaunbaug matter, and the Delhi Uphaar fire tragedy dissenting judgment holding the management liable for colossal loss of human lives and directing them to pay heavy compensation to be used for social causes like building trauma centres.
