= K. S. Puttaswamy =

Indian judge (1926–2024)

Hon'ble Mr. Justice K. S. Puttaswamy

Judge, High Court of Karnataka
- In office 28 November 1977 – 31 August 1986
- Appointed by: Neelam Sanjiva Reddy

Vice-Chairman, Central Administrative Tribunal, Bangalore Bench
- In office 1 September 1986 – 31 October 1989

Chairman, Andhra Pradesh Administrative Tribunal
- In office 1 November 1989 – 1 October 1993

Chairman, Andhra Pradesh Commission for Backward Classes
- In office 26 January 1994 – 1 October 2003
- Appointed by: Kotla Vijaya Bhaskara Reddy

Personal details
- Born: 8 February 1926 Korati, Kolar, Kingdom of Mysore
- Died: 28 October 2024 (aged 98) Bengaluru, Karnataka, India
- Spouse: Thayamma (m. 1952)
- Children: 9
- Education: Maharaja's College, Mysore; University Law College, Bangalore

K. S. Puttaswamy (8 February 1926 – 28 October 2024) was an Indian judge of the Karnataka High Court who was also the original petitioner, challenging the Government of India over making Aadhaar mandatory. He had filed a writ petition in 2012 and over the last five years, 26 other petitions have been tagged along with his, challenging the scheme.

== Education ==
Puttaswamy studied at the Maharaja's College, Mysore and the Government Law College in Bangalore.

== Career ==
Puttaswamy enrolled as an advocate in 1952. He was appointed judge of the Karnataka High Court in November 1977. He was appointed the first vice-chairman of the Central Administrative Tribunal, Bangalore Bench, in September 1986. In November 1989, he was appointed the first Chairman of the Andhra Pradesh Administrative Tribunal constituted under the Uniform Administrative Tribunals Act. On 26 January 1994, Andhra Pradesh Chief Minister Kotla Vijaya Bhaskara Reddy constituted the Backward Classes Commission under the Chairmanship of Justice K. S. Puttaswamy.

== Jurisprudence & Litigation ==
=== Income-Tax Act, 1961 ===
In the case of B.S. Jayachandra vs Income-Tax Officer And Anr. on 24 March 1986, the petitioner urged that section 2(14)(iii) of the Act dealing with income "arising from sale of lands used for agricultural purposes" is outside the legislative competence of the centre as the subject is exclusively assigned to states either under Entry No. 18 or 46 of List II, State List of the 7th Schedule to the Constitution. Justice Puttaswamy observed that there isn't a difference and distinction between agricultural lands in India as defined in section 2(14) or lands used for agricultural purposes. The income from the sale of such lands will not be revenue income but will be income from a capital asset and will naturally be capital gains chargeable to tax on that basis and no other. In other words, the user of lands for agriculture or other purpose cannot and does not make any difference to decide the nature of the gains made on the transfer of the capital asset. In rejecting the contention of the petitioner, Justice Puttaswamy opined that the Union Parliament was competent to define the terms "agricultural income", "agricultural land" and "capital asset" and thus bring to tax capital gains arising or accruing from agricultural lands situated within municipal limits and eight kilometres of notified municipal areas, which had ceased to be agricultural lands.

=== Central Excise and Salt Act, 1944 ===
The Assistant Collector of Central Excise, IDO No. 23, Bangalore-1 issued show cause notice No. C. No. V. 23A(17)18/75 to the petitioner, M/s Alembic Glass Industries Ltd., Baroda, a public limited company, proposing to withdraw or revoke the provisional approval accorded by the Superintendent of Central Excise, Bangalore, which allowed the cost of ‘cartons’ or ‘packing materials’ supplied by its buyers to be not includible in the assessable value of excisable goods manufactured and supplied to its wholesale purchasers. The petitioner contended that the packing material supplied by buyers is not includible in the assessable value of ‘glass and glassware’ manufactured and supplied to the wholesale buyers under the Act and therefore, the impugned notice is manifestly illegal. Counsel for the Central Government, appearing for the respondents contended that the Court should decline to interfere with the show cause notice on the ground that it is open to the petitioner to show cause, which the authority is bound to examine and decide and that the ultimate order to be made was appealable under the Act. Rejecting this objection by the respondent, Justice Puttaswamy observed that "this case for reasons that are not necessary to examine, has been pending before this Court for more than 9 years. If at this stage, this Court were to decline to interfere, though there is no dispute on facts, the final determination of the question that arises is likely to take another decade" and proceeded to examine the merits. Holding that ‘packing materials’ are supplied by the buyers only and that the same is neither manufactured nor purchased by the petitioner to supply its manufactured articles to the wholesale purchasers, Justice Puttaswamy dismissed the writ petition and quashed the impugned show cause notice issued by the Assistant Collector.

=== Central Sales Tax Act, 1956 ===
M/s. Mac Charles Brothers (Private) Limited had undertaken the construction of a five star hotel on premises No. 28, Sankey Road, Bangalore City and made an application before the Commercial Tax Officer "CTO", X Additional Circle, Bangalore under the Central Sales Tax "CST" Act of 1956 and the Central Sales Tax (Registration and Turnover) Rules, 1957 for registration in dealing with the articles detailed in an annexure to that application. On an examination of the same, the CTO issued a registration certificate on 23 January 1984, to be valid from 9 October 1983, for certain specified goods only and impliedly rejected the same for all other goods. In so far as the CTO rejected the said application, the petitioner approached the Court in Writ Petition No. 15158 of 1984 which was disposed of by the Court on 10 October 1984, with a direction to the CTO to redetermine the matter. In compliance of that order, the CTO heard the petitioner and made an order on 18 October 1984 accepting the case of the petitioner for "cold storage and refrigeration equipment" and rejecting the same for all other goods. The petitioner has challenged the order dated 18 October 1984, of the CTO to the extent it has rejected its application and has sought for a writ in the nature of mandamus to the CTO to include all goods specified in its application. In quashing the impugned order except to the extent of "building materials and stones" and issuing a writ in the nature of mandamus to the respondent to include all other items refused in that order in the certificate of registration already issued to the petitioner under the CST Act, Justice Puttaswamy noted "When I examine the claim made by the petitioner with reference to every one of the items for which it had registration, it is not possible to hold that they are not integrally connected with the ultimate production of goods. In this view, the rejection by the CTO was unjustified and illegal."

=== Right to Privacy, 2012 ===
Retired Justice K.S. Puttaswamy turned litigant for the first time in his legal career, spanning five decades, when he petitioned the Supreme Court against the linking of state benefits to the UID scheme saying that much money has been wasted on the ‘dangerous’ project. Arguing passionately that "It is a clear violation of citizens privacy and among various other reasons this program was rejected by the Parliamentary Standing Committee on Finance, but still the Government of India went ahead with it. How can this awfully wrong program roll out without a clear legislation?", Justice K.S. Puttaswamy filed the PIL for scrapping the Aadhar project in 2012. On 24 August 2017, a nine judge bench of the Supreme Court of India in a remarkable and wide ranging 547-page judgment ruled unanimously that privacy is a constitutionally protected right in India in the case of Puttaswamy v Union of India. With the Supreme Court declaring the Right to Privacy a fundamental right, Justice K.S. Puttaswamy said "I am completely vindicated by the decision. My contention had always been that Aadhaar enrolment can be made voluntary, in which case I would not have petitioned". In February 2020, the High Court of Kenya at Nairobi referred to the Indian Supreme Court judgment in Justice K.S. Puttaswamy (Retd.) and Another v. Union of India and Others to hold that biometric data is necessary for identification purposes and adopted the findings in Justice K.S. Puttaswamy (Retd.) on the necessity of different types of biometric data in identification. This became one of the landmark judgments in the history of India.

== Views and opinions ==
=== Dams and Environment ===
Justice Puttaswamy felt that courts cannot and should not interfere with the construction of dams. He wrote "In my view, the one and only question, on which we should focus our attention is, that in the construction of dams in future, the principle of the "greatest good to the greatest number" which necessarily results in some hardship and inconvenience to a few cannot be avoided, must alone be the guide. He advocated for the construction of smaller dams, rather than mighty ones, with lesser ecological effects and wrote that even this, is a matter for experts to decide, not for the courts. He suggested that before undertaking construction of any dam, there should be a complete, full and impartial investigation of all aspects. In the course of investigation, all the affected parties, the environmentalists and the general public must be involved and their views and objections duly considered by the experts and decided on merit and not on any collateral considerations. Once that is done, dams should be constructed, with speed and dispatch, avoiding all escalations in costs. Observing that courts cannot and should not interfere with the construction of dams, he said "With all due respects, the interference by our Supreme Court in the Narmada Dam matter is not legally sound and justified". He observed that the principle of "equitable apportionment", "protection of existing users" or "first in time, first in right" evolved in settlement of international rivers or inter-state river disputes, firmly established and applied, can neither be doubted nor given a go by based on a doctrinaire approach.

=== Interlinking of Rivers ===
Justice Puttaswamy wrote that he asked a leading Swiss expert on dams, Raymond Lafitte, when he was visiting New Delhi, what his view was on China’s Three Gorges Project. Raymond Lafitte thought for a while and said that it was a most laudable venture because after just two decades it would take to build, commission and operate, 50 million people downstream would be able to cultivate their lands without flooding and be assured of regular releases. When Justice Puttaswamy questioned ‘what about the over one million people that have been deprived of their homes and have to be resettled elsewhere on account of this mega project?’, he replied ‘That is the price we must pay for future progress!’. In response, Justice Puttaswamy told the Swiss expert that "the Three Gorges Project – beneficial as it is in the long run – can never be a possibility in India, under a democracy based on individual rights and freedoms." Three Gorges project implementation had commenced in 1999 and the same may take another 10 years to complete. Justice Puttaswamy observed that what has been stated by the Swiss expert, applies equally to the Interlinking of Inter State Rivers in India. Justice Puttaswamy hoped to stimulate an intellectual discussion by intellectuals, experts and the public expressing their views, either for or against the same and forwarding them to the Secretary, Ministry of Water Resources for further action. He observed that this topic is of utmost importance and aspired to generate a useful discussion leading to a public demand for the implementation of interlinking of rivers which will benefit the people of India as a whole.

== Death ==
Puttaswamy died in Bengaluru on 28 October 2024, at the age of 98.
