= M. Karpaga Vinayagam =

5th Chief Justice of Jharkhand High Court (2006-2008)

Hon'ble Chief Justice (Retd.) Muthusamy Karpaga Vinayagam

Chairperson of Appellate Tribunal for Electricity
- In office 14 November 2008 – 13 November 2011
- Appointed by: Pratibha Patil
- Preceded by: Anil Dev Singh
- In office 1 December 2011 – 30 November 2014
- Appointed by: Pratibha Patil
- Succeeded by: Ranjana Desai

5th Chief Justice of Jharkhand High Court
- In office 17 September 2006 – 15 May 2008
- Nominated by: Y. K. Sabharwal
- Appointed by: A. P. J. Abdul Kalam
- Preceded by: Nelavoy Dhinakar; M. Y. Eqbal (acting)
- Succeeded by: Gyan Sudha Misra; M. Y. Eqbal (acting)

Judge of Madras High Court
- In office 8 January 1996 – 16 September 2006
- Nominated by: A. M. Ahmadi
- Appointed by: S. D. Sharma

Personal details
- Born: 16 May 1946 (age 80) Devakottai, Tamil Nadu
- Education: B.A. in Economics and LL.B
- Alma mater: Alagappa University, Madras Law College

Muthusamy Karpaga Vinayagam (born 16 May 1946) is a retired Indian judge, Tamil scholar and 5th Chief Justice of the Jharkhand High Court.

== Early life ==
Vinayagam was born in 1946 at Devakottai, Tamil Nadu in a family with legal background. He passed B.A. in Economics in 1969 from Alagappa University and got LL.B. degree from the Madras Law College in 1972.

== Career ==
Vinayagam got enrolled himself as an advocate in the Bar Council of Tamil Nadu in the year 1972 and started practice as a Criminal side Advocate in the Madras High Court. He appeared as the Government Counsel in the High Court for seven years consecutively. In 1993 he became the Editor of the Delhi-based law journal Current Criminal Report.

Vinayagam was elevated as a Judge in the Madras High Court on 8 January 1996. He was appointed the Chief Justice of Jharkhand High Court on 17 September 2006 and retired on 15 May 2008. After the retirement, he practiced in the Supreme Court of India as senior advocate.

=== Literary work ===
Apart from his judicial career Justice Vinayagam has immense knowledge on Classical and ancient Tamil language. He wrote a book on Criminal Law in the Ancient Period.

== Post retirement ==
In November 2008 Vinayagam was appointed to the post of the Chairperson of the Appellate Tribunal for Electricity, New Delhi and reappointed in 2011 to serve their till 2014.
