= Anjani Kumar Mishra =

Chief Justice of Allahabad High Court

Justice Anjani Kumar Mishra

Judge of Allahabad High Court
- In office 12 April 2013 – 16 May 2025
- Nominated by: Altamas Kabir
- Appointed by: Pranab Mukherjee

Personal details
- Born: 17 May 1963 (age 63)

Anjani Kumar Mishra (born 17 May 1963) is an Indian judge who has served as a judge of Allahabad High Court.

== Life and work ==
He completed his law degree from Allahabad University in 1988 and enrolled as an advocate on January 8, 1989. He mainly practiced in core areas such as civil, consolidation, constitutional, revenue and company, and other interconnected areas. He also served as the standing counsel for the Medical Council of India, eventually elevated to the position of an additional judge on April 12, 2013. He took the oath as permanent judge on Apr 10, 2015. He has retired on 16 May 2025 after attaining the retirement age of 62 years as prescribed for High Court Judges.
