= Appellate Tribunal for Electricity =

Agency overview
- Headquarters: India
- Parent agency: Ministry of Power (India)
- Website: aptel.gov.in

The Appellate Tribunal for Electricity in India is created as a statutory and autonomous body under the Electricity Act, 2003 to hear complaints, appeals or original petitions against the orders of the State Regulatory Commission, The Central Regulatory Commission, Joint Commission or the Adjudicating officer.

== History ==
Appellate Tribunal for Electricity was formed under the Electricity Act, 2003 to hear complaints or appeals relating to orders issued by adjudicating officer or the Central Regulatory Commission and State Electricity Regulatory Commissions in the year 2005. Any order passed by The Appellate Tribunal for Electricity is appealable before the Hon’ble Supreme Court of India if the issue is related to substantial questions of law.

== Composition ==
The Chairperson of the Appellate Tribunal for Electricity should be a sitting or retired judge of High Court or the Supreme court. The group of eminent members selected from all professions of life is formed to choose the Chairperson and members of the Tribunal.

The Appellate Tribunal for Electricity includes a chairperson, one judicial member, and three technical members.

Vacant, Chairperson since August 2025.

The service period will be four years or attaining the age of superannuation, or issuance of orders for the appointment of a new Chairperson.

=== List of Chairpersons (Appellate Tribunal For Electricity ) ===
List of Chairpersons:

| No. | Name | Tenure | |
|---|---|---|---|
| 1 | Justice Anil Dev Singh | 2005 | 2008 |
| 2 | Justice M. Karpaga Vinayagam | 2008 | 2014 |
| 3 | Justice Ranjana Desai | 2014 | 2017 |
| _ | I.J. Kapoor (Officiating) | 2017 | 2018 |
| 4 | Justice Manjula Chellur | 2018 | 2021 |
| _ | R.K. Verma (Officiating) | 2021 | 2021 |
| _ | Justice R.K. Gauba (Officiating) | 2021 | 2022 |
| 5 | Justice Ramesh Ranganathan | 2022 | 2026 |

== Powers ==
Following are powers

- Any order of the Adjudicating officer or The Central Regulatory Commission or State Regulatory Commission or Joint Commission is appealable or petition against the same can be filed.
- Direct the central and state governments on the performance of their statutory duties.

== See also ==
- State Electricity Regulatory Commission (India)
