= Haj subsidy =

Subsidy given to Hajj pilgrims by Govt of India

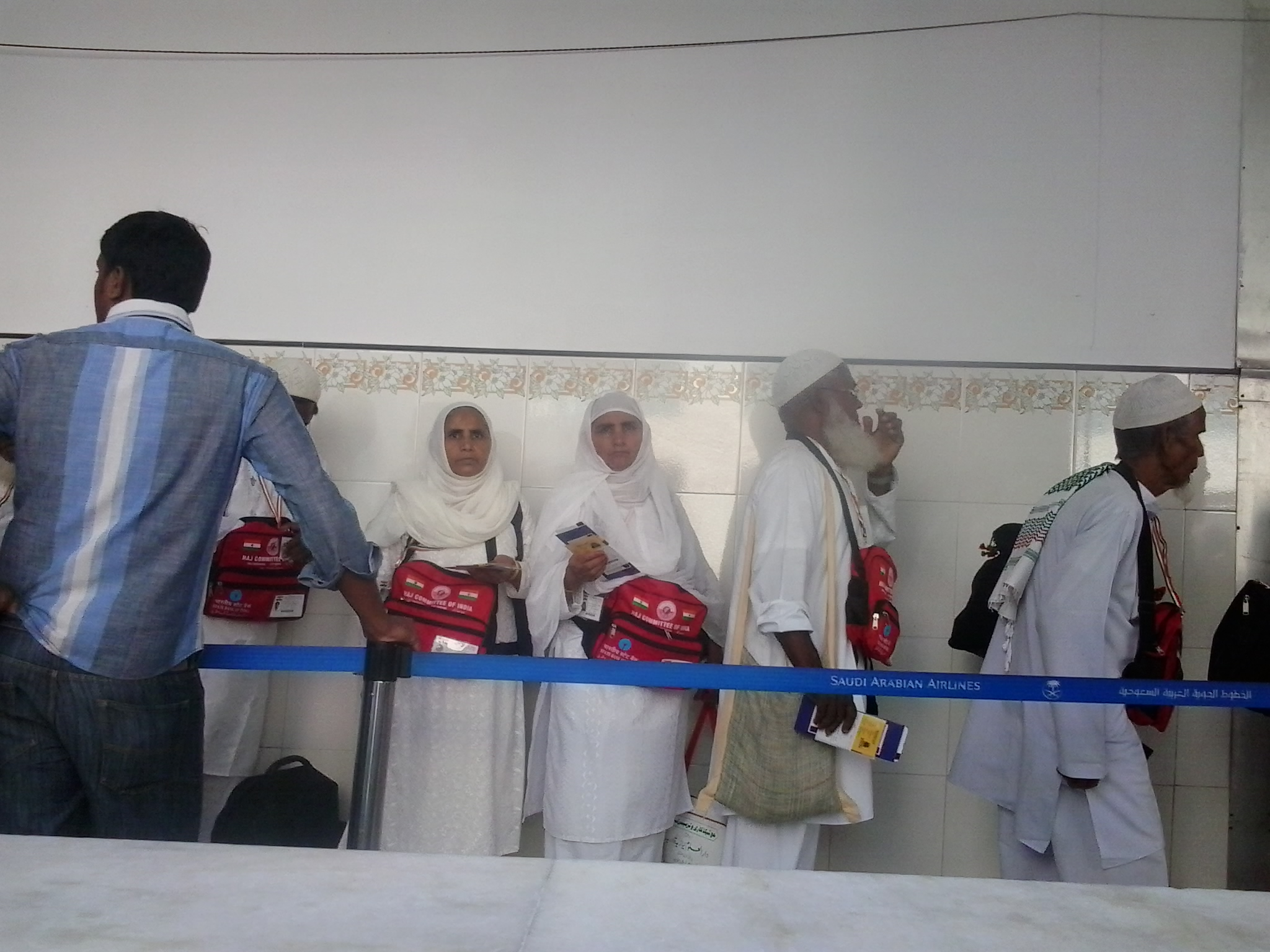
Indian Muslims in Lucknow on their way to Saudi Arabia covered by Hajj subsidy (air tickets)

The Haj subsidy was a subsidy based on religion that was given to Hajj pilgrims by the Government of India in the form of discounted air fare so that a pilgrim could fly to Mecca for Hajj. The policy had always been controversial until it was abolished under the ruling of the Supreme Court of India.

In the post-colonial era, the INC-led Government of India enacted the program in 1959 with the Hajj Act. The subsidy initially applied to Indian Muslim pilgrims traveling for religious reasons to Saudi Arabia, Syria, Iraq, Iran and Jordan by road and by sea. Expanded Haj subsidy started in 1954, as an idea initiated by the then government, with flights between Mumbai and Jeddah. Additional flight legs were added over the years, and since 1984, all Haj traffic has been shared by Air India and Saudia, the national carriers of India and Saudi Arabia. The monopoly of these airlines had proven the most contentious point of the subsidy, with some claiming that the real beneficiary is Air India as the subsidy is actually a discount on an overpriced air fare. In the past, the Haj board used to call for a bid to fly these Muslims to Mecca; for many years, Saudi Arabia (Saudi government owned airline) has been the lowest bidder.

In May 2012, a Supreme Court of India bench, composed of Altamas Kabir and Ranjana Desai, ordered the government to end the practice by 2022. "We direct the Central government to progressively reduce the amount of subsidy so as to completely eliminate it within a period of 10 years from today," said a bench of Justices Aftab Alam and Ranjana P Desai. "The subsidy money may be more profitably used for uplift of the community in education and other indices of social development," said Justice Alam, who wrote the order. The court said it has no authority to speak on the minority community's behalf and that it would be presumptuous to tell the Muslims what was a good or bad religious practice even though it cited the Quran to say that haj pilgrimage was mandatory only for those who could afford the expenses for traveling, food and accommodation.

In a Central Haj Committee meeting in November 2017, it was decided that Haj subsidy would be completely phased out by 2018 and that the funds would be used for educational programmes, especially for girls in minority communities. On 16 January 2018, the Union minister for minority affairs confirmed that the Haj subsidy had been ended and that its funding would be used for educating girls from minority communities.

== History ==
=== Pre-1947 British Raj era ===
The Haj subsidy traces its origins to the British colonial era. In 1932, the British colonial government enacted The Port Haj Committees Act, which provided for government funded Haj Committee and named Bombay and Calcutta as two embarkation points for Haj by Muslims in British India. Along with Muslim Personal Law (Shariat) Application Act of 1937, the Haj Committees Act was one of a series of laws passed by the British colonial government to address Muslim demands in a riot torn, pre-partition South Asia. The colonial government also granted a monopoly for sea-based Haj pilgrimage by South Asian Muslims to Mogul Line ships, owned by the British company Turner Morrison & Co. Ltd.

=== Post-colonial era ===
In 1959, Indian government repealed and replaced the 1932 Act, enacting the Haj Committee Act, to establish a Committee in the Port of Bombay for assisting Muslim pilgrims to Saudi Arabia, Syria, Iraq, Iran and Jordan and for matters connected therewith. The purpose of this Act was to manage all affairs of pilgrims like disseminating information, to negotiate travel arrangements, arranging guides, helping the needy and to address grievances of pilgrims. Article 16 of the 1959 law also created a taxpayer financed Haj Fund to cover overhead expenses.

=== From sea travel to air travel ===
The Haj subsidy was modified in 1973, when the Indian government abolished sea travel as a means of making the Haj for two reasons - rising oil prices after formation of OPEC, and a ship accident that killed 39 pilgrims in June 1973 during the government-managed Haj trip. The government of India replaced the means of travel to Saudi Arabia from ships to aircraft. The government simultaneously increased the subsidy to cover the difference between sea and air fares.

Since 1994 the round trip cost to Jeddah, Saudi Arabia has been fixed at ₹12,000 (US$120) per pilgrim, and the government has footed the rest of the bill. Since 2000, over 1.5 million Muslims have used the subsidy; since 2008, over 120,000 Indian Muslims every year made use of the subsidy. In 2007 the government spent ₹47,454 (US$490) per passenger. The Haj subsidy includes an airfare subsidy, as well as assistance to Muslim pilgrims for domestic travel to reach specially designed Haj departure airport terminals, meals, medical care and lodging assistance provided by the Government of India. The Indian government has created separate Haj air terminals for Muslim pilgrims for their convenience at major airports. The average airfare subsidy was about ₹73,526 (US$760) per Muslim pilgrim in 2008, while the average non-airfare financial assistance was ₹2,697 (US$28) per pilgrim. The total subsidy provided by the Government of India was US$1,815 per Muslim pilgrim in 2008. In the year 2009 the cost was ₹8.26 billion (US$86 million).

Hajj subsidy paid
Year	Hajis sent on subsidy	Subsidy paid by the government
2000	71,924	
2001	71,215	
2002	70,298	
2003	70,019	
2004	71,945	
2005	80,786	
2006	99,926	
2007	109,991	₹5.95 billion (US$62 million)
2008	121,694	₹8.95 billion (US$93 million)
2009	121,695	₹8,647.7 million (US$90 million)
2010	126,191	
2011	125,051	
2012	–	

The Ministry of Civil Aviation provided a subsidy for air travel to the pilgrims through the Haj Committee of India. The amount on air travel charged per pilgrim during Haj 2014 was Rs. 35,000/- whereas the actual air fare ranged from Rs. 63,750 to Rs. 1,63,350 depending on the embarkation point in India which were always higher than normal charges of air tickets. For Haj-2015, an amount of Rs. 42,000/- will be charged as airfare from each pilgrim performing Haj through HCOI. The subsidy amount extended was Rs. 836.56 crores in 2012 to Rs. 680.03 crores in 2013. In 2014, it has further reduced to Rs. 533 crores.

=== Supreme Court order to abolish Haj subsidy ===
In 2012, the Supreme Court of India ordered that Haj subsidy must end by 2022. The Supreme Court found that Hajj by Indian Muslims is funded to a substantial extent by the Indian Government. The Court ruled that this subsidy is not only unconstitutional but inconsistent with the teachings of the Quran. The Court cited Quran verse 97 in Surah 3, Al-e-Imran ordains as under: "In it are manifest signs (for example), the Maqam (place) of Ibrahim (Abraham); whosoever enters it, he attains security. And Hajj (pilgrimage to Makkah) to the House (Ka’bah) is a duty that mankind owes to Allah, those who can afford the expenses (for one’s conveyance, provision and residence); and whoever disbelieves [i.e. denies Hajj (pilgrimage to Makkah), then he is a disbeliever of Allah], then Allah stands not in need of any of the Alamin (mankind, jinn and all that exists)."

The Court directed the Central Government to progressively reduce the amount of Haj subsidy and abolish it by 2022. The Court, in its 2012 order, said the centre should invest that amount in education and other development measures for the minority community. also directed the Indian government to stop providing Haj subsidies to Muslims identified by central government as very important person (VIP), very very important person (VVIP), and the special dignitaries and eminent persons nominations of 3,000 Muslims per year under so-called Goodwill Delegation to Saudi Arabia.

In August 2010, the Minority Affairs Ministry formally opposed providing subsidy for Haj pilgrimage, saying the scheme was contrary to the teachings of Islam. The Government of India proposed that starting from 2011, the amount of government subsidy per person would be decreased, and by 2017 would be ended completely. (Instead, "a premium would be charged from better-off Hajis to cross-subsidise the travel cost for the less well-off Hajis".)

The centre had informed the Supreme Court that it had decided to restrict Haj pilgrimage at government subsidy to Muslims only as a "once in a lifetime" affair as against the existing policy of "once in five years". In an affidavit filed before the apex court, the government said the new guidelines have been framed to ensure that priority is given to those applicants who have never performed Haj. The apex court was hearing an appeal filed by the Centre challenging a Bombay high court judgement which had directed the Ministry of External Affairs to allow certain private operators to operate the services of 800 of the 11,000 pilgrims earmarked under the VIP quota subsidised by the government. Earlier, the bench had pulled up the centre's practice of "politicising" the annual Haj pilgrimage by permitting official delegations to accompany the pilgrims, for which the government offers huge subsidy, saying, "It's a bad religious practice."

On 27 July 2012, the Supreme Court declined Centre's request to defer till next year its 23 July order downsizing the government's discretionary quota to 300 from the proposed 5,050 seats and had hoped these would be allotted on "reasonable basis".

=== Phase-out ===
The subsidy had been reduced from Rs. 685 crore in 2011 to Rs 200 crore by 2017. It was stopped by the government from 2018 onwards and will be used instead for education of Muslim girls. Union minister Mukhtar Abbas Naqvi confirmed it had been withdrawn.

== Criticism ==
Considerable criticism has been levelled against this practice, both by all Hindu organisations opposed to state funding of private pilgrimage outside India and by Muslim pressure groups. As an example of the latter, Mohib Ahmad contends that even Air India's subsidised fare is higher than competing airlines' ordinary fare. However, the government has continued offering the Haj subsidy despite protests from the Muslim community at large. Syed Shahabuddin claims that Air India's rising costs for travel, and the consequent increases in the Government of India's subsidy, have resulted partly from differences in foreign exchange rates beyond the airline's control. He suggests charter fares should be set at two-thirds of regular IATA fares, but points out that the Haj has higher costs than other charters because two empty flights are required to return the aircraft to India and to position the aircraft in Arabia for the pilgrims' return journey. Shahabuddin maintains that the subsidy ought to be phased out because Hindus view the subsidy as preferential treatment of India's Muslim minority. one of India's most Renowned Islamic Scholars, Dr. Zafarul Islam Khan states that,"Muslims, in general, are not in favour of the Hajj subsidy. We consider the subsidy as a subsidy to Air India and not to the Muslim community."

Syed Ahmed Bukhari, the Shahi Imam of Delhi's Jama Masjid mosque, said a decade was far too long for the subsidy to be phased out. "It should be done away with within a year," he told reporters. Salman Khurshid, minister for minority affairs (2009 to 2012), expressed no surprise about the court's decision, telling reporters that discussions to "roll back the Haj subsidy" had been underway for four years. Asaduddin Owaisi, a member of parliament from the city of Hyderabad said, this amount of subsidy is to simply being a subsidy for Air India. Ticket prices would be far lower, he said yesterday, if Air India's monopoly were broken and pilgrims simply bought their own, unsubsidised tickets on other airlines.

Other Muslim leaders have argued that the Haj subsidy is "un-Islamic" and that Haj money should be invested in education and health instead. Maulana Mahmood A. Madani, a member of the Rajya Sabha and general secretary of the Jamiat-e-Ulema-e-Hind, declared that the Haj subsidy is a technical violation of Islamic Sharia, since the Koran declares that Haj should be performed by Muslims using their own resources. Influential Muslim lobbies in India have regularly insisted that the Hajj subsidy should be phased out as it is un-Islamic. Praveen Togadia of Vishwa Hindu Parishad has argued that the government sponsored Haj subsidy is provided from taxes of Hindus to pay for Muslim religious pilgrimages, and demanded that it be abolished or similar grants be extended to Hindus.
