= Puttaswamy v. Union of India =

Indian Fundamental Rights Case Law

- Court: Supreme Court of India
- Full case name: Justice K. S. Puttaswamy (Retd.) and Anr. vs Union Of India And Ors.
- Decided: August 24, 2017
- Citation: Writ Petition (Civil) No 494 of 2012; (2017) 10 SCC 1; AIR 2017 SC 4161

Case history
- Related actions: decriminalization of homosexuality; decriminalization of adultery

Court membership
- Judges sitting: J.S. Khehar, J. Chelameswar, S.A. Bobde, R.K. Agarwal, Rohinton F. Nariman, A.M. Sapre, Dr. D.Y. Chandrachud, Sanjay Kishan Kaul and S.A. Nazeer

Case opinions
- The right to privacy is protected under Articles 14, 19 and 21 of the Constitution.
- Concurrence: 6 separate concurring decisions
- Dissent: None

Laws applied
- This case overturned a previous ruling
- MP Sharma v Satish Chandra (1954) Kharak Singh v State of Uttar Pradesh and Others (1962) ADM Jabalpur v. Shivkant Shukla (1976)

Justice K.S. Puttaswamy (Retd.) & Anr. vs. Union of India & Ors. (2017), commonly known as the Right to Privacy verdict, was a landmark decision of the Supreme Court of India, which held that the right to privacy is protected as a fundamental right under Articles 14, 19 and 21 of the Constitution of India. The original petitioner Justice K.S. Puttaswamy was a former judge of the Karnataka High Court.

A nine-judge bench of J. S. Khehar, J. Chelameswar, S. A. Bobde, R. K. Agrawal, R. F. Nariman, A. M. Sapre, D. Y. Chandrachud, S. K. Kaul, and S. A. Nazeer unanimously held that "the right to privacy is protected as an intrinsic part of the right to life and personal liberty under Article 21 and as a part of the freedoms guaranteed by Part III of the Constitution." It explicitly overrules previous judgements of the Supreme Court in Kharak Singh vs. State of UP and M.P. Sharma vs. Union of India, which held that there is no fundamental right to privacy under the Indian Constitution.

This judgement settled this position of law and clarified that the Right to Privacy could be infringed upon only when there was a compelling state interest for doing so. This position was the same as with the other fundamental rights.

== Background ==
After Facebook acquired WhatsApp in 2014, WhatsApp's new data sharing policy was challenged in the Supreme Court. The Supreme Court had to decide if the right to privacy could be enforced against private entities.

A three-judge bench first heard the legal challenge to the "Aadhaar card scheme". Before this bench, Attorney General of India took a stand that the legal position regarding the existence of the fundamental right to privacy is doubtful in view of Supreme Court's earlier judgments. On August 11, the three-judge bench referred the question of right to privacy to a larger bench. In October 2015, a five-judge constitution bench modified the order and allowed the central government's request to bring further services within the scope of Aadhaar.

The nine-judge bench was used because, when the case was on the list, Supreme Court Chief Justice Khehar was informed that in the past there was a verdict from an eight-judge bench as well as a six-judge bench, both holding the view that the Right to Privacy is not a fundamental right. CJI Khehar then decided to constitute a nine-judge bench to rule on the question of Right to Privacy. This nine-judge bench gave a unanimous decision on the case, recognizing every individual's fundamental right to privacy under the Constitution.

In March 2016, Parliament of India passed the Aadhaar (Targeted Delivery of Financial and Other Subsidies, Benefits and Services) Bill, 2016 as a money bill. Rajya Sabha MP Jairam Ramesh filed a fresh petition challenging the Act Aadhaar Act, 2016, claiming it to be “unconstitutional” for being passed as a money bill.

== Hearing the case ==
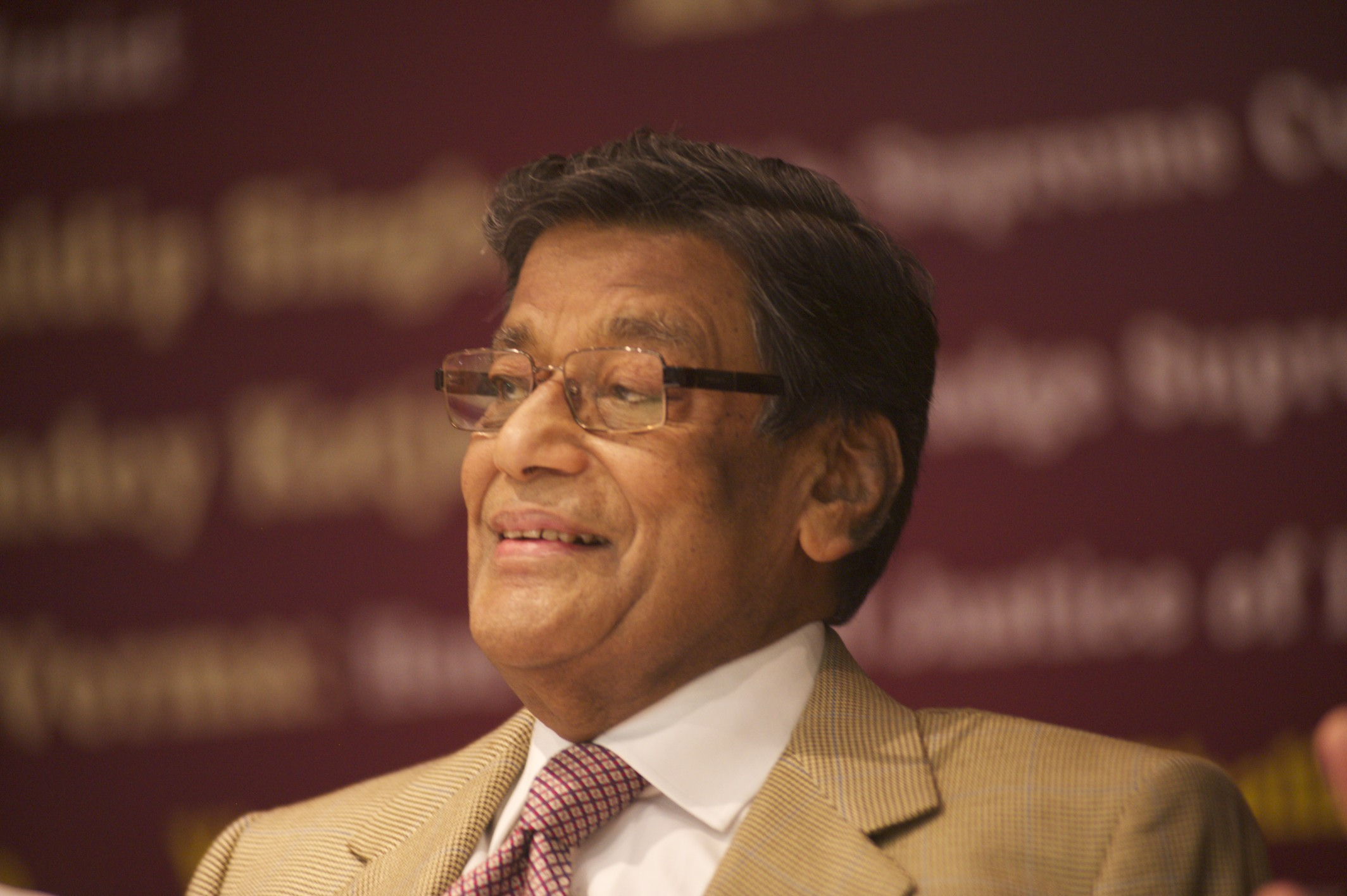
Attorney General K.K. Venugopal

The Attorney General of India K.K. Venugopal had opposed the elevation of privacy as a fundamental right, representing the stance of the Union government of India in the Supreme Court. The previous Attorney General, Mukul Rohatgi, had opposed the right to privacy entirely, but Venugopal, while opposing the right, conceded that privacy could be a "wholly qualified fundamental right."

== Judgment ==
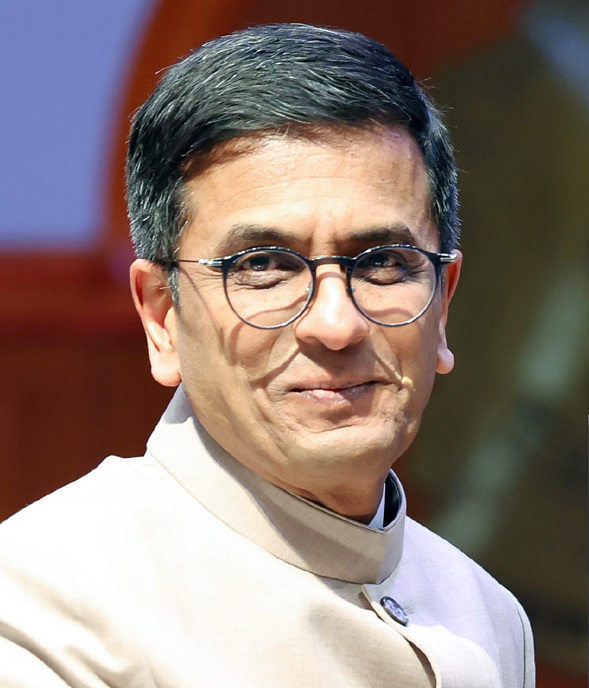
Justice DY Chandrachud, who authored the unanimous opinion

On 24 August 2017, the Supreme Court of India gave the Right to Privacy verdict. In the case of Justice K.S. Puttaswamy (Retd.) and Anr. vs Union of India and Ors. The Supreme Court held that the Right to Privacy is a fundamental right protected under Article 21 and Part III of the Indian Constitution. The judgment mentioned Section 377 as a "discordant note which directly bears upon the evolution of the constitutional jurisprudence on the right to privacy." In the judgment delivered by the nine-judge bench, Justice Chandrachud (who authored for Justices Khehar, Agarwal, Abdul Nazeer and himself), held that the rationale behind the Suresh Koushal (2013) Judgement is incorrect, and the judges clearly expressed their disagreement with it. Justice Kaul agreed with Justice Chandrachud's view that the right to privacy cannot be denied, even if a minuscule fraction of the affected population exists. He went on to state that the majoritarian concept does not apply to Constitutional rights, and the courts are often called upon to take what may be categorized as a non-majoritarian view, in the check and balance of power envisaged under the Constitution of India.

Sexual orientation is an essential attribute of privacy. Discrimination against an individual based on sexual orientation is deeply offensive to an individual's dignity and self-worth. Equality demands that the sexual orientation of each individual in society must be protected on an even platform. The right to privacy and the protection of sexual orientation lie at the core of the fundamental rights guaranteed by Articles 14, 15, and 21 of the Constitution.

Their rights are not "so-called" but are real rights founded on sound constitutional doctrine. They inhere in the right to life. They dwell in privacy and dignity. They constitute the essence of liberty and freedom. Sexual orientation is an essential component of identity. Equal protection demands protecting the identity of every individual without discrimination.

The ADM Jabalpur case was overruled on the doctrinal grounds concerning the rights by the same verdict. At the paragraph 119 of the majority opinion, the court had ruled:

"The judgments rendered by all the four judges constituting the majority in Additional District Magistrate, Jabalpur are seriously flawed. Life and personal liberty are inalienable to human existence. These rights are, as recognized in Kesavananda Bharati, primordial rights. They constitute rights under natural law.

The human element in the life of the individual is integrally founded on the sanctity of life. Dignity is associated with liberty and freedom. No civilised state can contemplate an encroachment upon life and personal liberty without the authority of law.

"Neither life nor liberty are bounties conferred by the State nor does the Constitution create these rights.

"The right to life has existed even before the advent of the Constitution. In recognizing the right, the Constitution does not become the sole repository of the right. It would be preposterous to suggest that a democratic Constitution without a Bill of Rights would leave individuals governed by the State without either the existence of the right to live or the means of enforcement of the right. The right to life is inalienable to each individual, it existed before the Constitution and continued in force under Article of the Constitution.

"Justice Khanna was right in holding that the recognition of the right to life and personal liberty under the Constitution does not denude the existence of that right, apart from it nor can there be a fatuous assumption that in adopting the Constitution the people of India surrendered the most precious aspects of the human persona, namely, life, liberty and freedom to the State on whose mercy these rights would depend. Such a construct is contrary to the basic foundation of the rule of law which imposes restraints upon the powers vested in the modern state when it deals with individual liberties.

"The power of the Court to issue a writ of habeas corpus is a precious and undeniable feature of the rule of law."

== Analysis ==
A nine-judge bench ruled that the Right to Privacy is a fundamental right for Indian citizens, so no legislation passed by the government can unduly violate it. Specifically, the court adopted the three-pronged test required for any encroachment of Article 21 right: legality, or the existence of a certain law; necessity, in terms of a legitimate state objective; and proportionality, which requires a rational connection between an object and the means required to get that object.

This clarification was crucial to prevent dilution of the right in the future to the whims and fancies of the government in power. The court adopted a liberal interpretation of the fundamental rights, holding that individual liberty must extend to digital spaces and individual autonomy, and privacy must be protected.

This judgment settled that position of law and clarified that the Right to Privacy could be infringed only when there was a compelling state interest for doing so. This position was the same as with the other fundamental rights.

This ruling by the Supreme Court paved the way for the decriminalization of homosexuality in India on 6 September 2018, thus legalizing same-sex sexual intercourse between two consenting adults in private. India is the world's largest democracy and with this ruling has joined the United States, Canada, South Africa, the European Union, and the UK in recognizing this fundamental right.

However, as the curative petition (challenging Section 377) is currently sub-judice, the judges authored that they would leave the constitutional validity to be decided in an appropriate proceeding. Legal experts have suggested that with this judgment, the judges have invalidated the reasoning behind the 2013 Judgement, thus laying the groundwork for Section 377 to be read down and the restoration of the 2009 High Court Judgement, thereby decriminalizing homosexual sex.

== Aftermath ==
The judgement was interpreted as paving the way for the eventual decriminalization of homosexuality in the case of Navtej Singh Johar v. Union of India (2018) and adultery in the case of Joseph Shine v. Union of India (2018).

== Reception ==
The Attorney General of India K. K. Venugopal had opposed the elevation of privacy as a fundamental right while explaining the stand of the Union government of India, in the Supreme Court. Later on while delivering the speech in the farewell ceremony of CJI JS Khehar, attorney Venugopal noted, "We have now an extraordinary judgement which has upheld the right to privacy as a major fundamental right which, if we look into the newspapers or TV, has been welcomed by every single person in this country. And that, I think, is one of the greatest things that the Supreme Court of India has done."

== See also ==
- List of landmark court decisions in India
- Navtej Singh Johar v. Union of India (2018)
- National Legal Services Authority v. Union of India (2014)
- ADM Jabalpur v. Shivkant Shukla (1976)
