= Ranjana Desai =

Indian judge (born 1949)

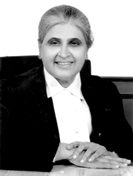

Chairperson of Delimitation Commission of India
- Incumbent
- Assumed office 13 March 2020
- Appointed by: Ram Nath Kovind
- Preceded by: Kuldip Singh (2002)

Judge of the Supreme Court of India
- In office 13 September 2011 – 29 October 2014
- Nominated by: Sarosh Homi Kapadia
- Appointed by: Pratibha Devisingh Patil

Judge of the Bombay High Court
- In office 1996–2011
- Nominated by: Aziz Mushabber Ahmadi
- Appointed by: Shankar Dayal Sharma

Personal details
- Born: Ranjana Samant; 30 October 1949 (age 77) Bombay, Maharashtra
- Spouse: Dr. Prakash Desai
- Children: Adv. Mike Desai (son)
- Parents: Adv. Shamrao Samant (father); Sharayu Samant (mother)

Ranjana Prakash Desai (born 30 October 1949) is a former judge of the Supreme Court of India and the head of the Delimitation Commission of India. She was previously a public prosecutor for the State of Maharashtra, and served as a judge on the Bombay High Court before her appointment to the Supreme Court. Following her retirement from the Supreme Court, Desai was the chairperson of the Indian Appellate Tribunal for Electricity.

== Early life and education ==
Desai's father was the criminal lawyer S. G. Samant. She completed her Bachelor of Arts from the Elphinstone College in 1970 and Bachelor of Laws from the Government Law College, Bombay in 1973.

== Career ==
Desai enrolled as an advocate on 30 July 1973, and began practicing law, working in the chambers of S.C. Pratap before he was appointed as judge in the Bombay High Court, as well as with her father, S.G. Samant, who practiced criminal law. In 1979, Desai began working as an Assistant Government Pleader in the Bombay High Court, appearing for the Government of Maharashtra, and in 1983, was appointed as an Assistant Government Pleader and Additional Public Prosecutor for the State of Maharashtra. In 1986, Desai was appointed as the State of Maharashtra's Special Public Prosecutor in cases concerning preventive detention. In 1995, she began appearing for the Government of Maharashtra as a government pleader in appeals at the Bombay High Court.

=== High Court of Bombay ===
Desai was initially appointed as an additional judge at the Bombay High Court on 15 April 1996 for a period of two years, and was confirmed as a permanent judge on 12 April 1998. She continued to serve as a judge on the Bombay High Court until she was appointed to the Supreme Court in 2011.

=== Supreme Court of India ===
On 13 September 2011, Desai was appointed as a judge at the Supreme Court of India and served in that capacity until 2014. She was the fifth woman to be appointed as an Indian Supreme Court judge.

=== Electricity Appellate Tribunal ===
Desai took charge as chairperson of Appellate Tribunal for Electricity on 1 December 2014 in New Delhi and continued to serve in that capacity until 29 October 2019.

=== Advance Ruling Authority [Income Tax] ===
Desai was appointed as Chairperson of the Advance Ruling Authority [Income Tax] in 2018 and held the position until 29 October 2019.

=== Lokpal appointment committee ===
On 28 September 2018, the Government of India constituted a search committee of eight, chaired by Desai, under the Lokpal and Lokayuktas Act, 2013, to search for and recommend a chairperson and members for India's anti-corruption ombudsman agency, the Lokpal. The Committee provided its recommendations to the Selection Committee on 28 February 2020.

=== Delimitation Commission of India ===
Desai was appointed as the chairperson of the Delimitation Commission of India on 13 March 2020.

=== Uniform civil code committee ===
Desai was appointed as the Head of the Uttarakhand UCC committee on 28 May 2022.

=== Press Council of India ===
Desai was appointed as the chairperson of the Press Council of India. Her term started on 17 June 2022.

=== 8th Central Pay Commission ===
Desai was appointed as the Chairperson of the 8th Central Pay Commission on 28 October 2025.

== Jurisprudence ==
On 8 May 2012, the Supreme Court bench composed of Ranjana Desai and Altamas Kabir ordered the government to end the Haj subsidy by 2022. On 27 September 2013, in a landmark decision, a three-judge bench consisting of the Chief Justice P. Sathasivam and Justices Desai and Ranjan Gogoi ruled that the right to register a "none of the above" vote in elections should apply. The court said that negative voting would lead to systemic change in polls and political parties will be forced to project clean candidates. The Election Commission said that the judgement will be implemented immediately.
