= P. K. Balasubramanyan =

Indian judge (born 1942)

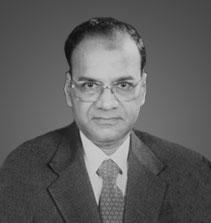

Judge of Supreme Court of India
- In office 27 August 2004 – 28 August 2007
- Nominated by: R. C. Lahoti
- Appointed by: A. P. J. Abdul Kalam

2nd Chief Justice of Jharkhand High Court
- In office 10 March 2003 – 26 August 2004
- Nominated by: V. N. Khare
- Appointed by: A. P. J. Abdul Kalam
- Preceded by: Vinod Kumar Gupta
- Succeeded by: Altamas Kabir; S. J. Mukhopadhaya (acting)

19th Chief Justice of Odisha High Court
- In office 5 December 2001 – 10 March 2003
- Nominated by: S. P. Bharucha
- Appointed by: K. R. Narayanan
- Preceded by: N. Y. Hanumanthappa
- Succeeded by: Sujit Barman Roy

Judge of Kerala High Court
- In office 4 June 1992 – 4 December 2001
- Nominated by: M. H. Kania
- Appointed by: R. Venkataraman
- Acting Chief Justice
- In office 3 July 2001 – 6 September 2001
- Appointed by: K. R. Narayanan
- Preceded by: K. K. Usha
- Succeeded by: B. N. Srikrishna

Personal details
- Born: 28 August 1942 (age 83)
- Education: B.Sc and LL.B
- Alma mater: Government College, Chittur, Madras Law College

Perubhemba Krishna Ayer Balasubramanyan (born 28 August 1942) is a former judge of the Supreme Court of India. He also served as Chief Justice of the High Courts of Orissa and Jharkhand. He is also former judge of Kerala High Court.

== Early life and career ==
He was born on 28 August 1942 and completed his secondary education in the village school and graduation from Government College, Chittur (Palghat District), he obtained the Law Degree from Madras Law College. He did apprenticeship under the guidance of Shri K. Raja Iyar, a former Advocate General of Madras. He was enrolled as an Advocate with Bar Council, Madras on October 5, 1964 and set up practice in the Kerala High Court at Ernakulam under Shri T. S. Venkateswara Iyer. He practiced in Civil Law on the Appellate side and the Constitutional Law. He was appointed as Standing Counsel for Food Corporation of India and the State Bank of India.

He was appointed as an Additional Judge of the Kerala High Court on 4 June 1992 and became permanent Judge on 10 March 1993. He was appointed as Chief Justice of the Orissa High Court on 5 December 2001. He was transferred as Chief Justice of the Jharkhand High Court on 10 March 2003 and remained there till his elevation as judge of the Supreme Court of India on 27 August 2004. He retired from Supreme Court on 28 August 2007.

He writes regularly for Outlook Magazine. He was appointed an independent arbitrator between Southern railways and a company called Cast Constructions P Ltd by Madras High Court to resolve a dispute.
