= Haj Committee of India =

Government agency

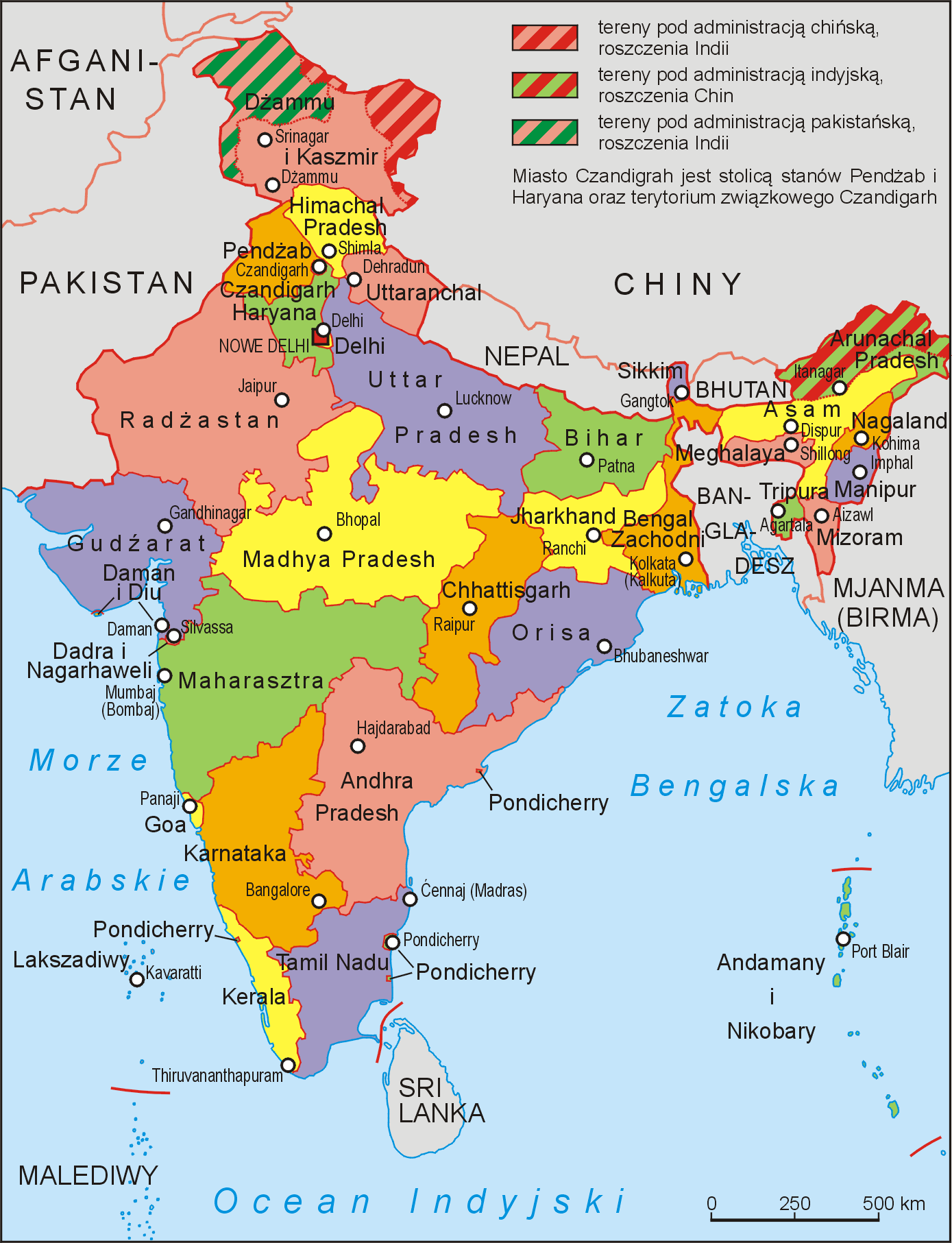

Haj Committee of India (also known as Central Haj Committee (CHC)) is a statutory body of the Indian government which organises Islamic pilgrimage to Saudi Arabia. It was established under Haj Committee Act in 2002. The committee acts as a nodal agency for state Haj committees and has 23 members, of which six are elected by state Haj committees, four are ex-official, three are MPs, seven are nominated by the central government and the rest come from the state which sends the largest number of pilgrims to Saudi Arabia. Saudi Arabia granted India a quota of 136,200 pilgrims in 2016, out of which 1,00,200 pilgrims' travel was said to have been arranged by the Haj committee. The committee distributes the allotted quota state-wise based on Muslim population density, according to the 2011 census.

The tradition of arranging religious pilgrimages by the Haj committee is traced back to 1927. The committee organised pilgrimages through sea-route and was headed by the Police Commissioner of Bombay D. Healy. The first meeting of the committee was held on 14 April 1927. Prior to 2002 Haj Committee Act, the first attempt to grant legal recognition to the committee was made by the British which passed Port Haj Committees Act in 1932 and later in 1959, when Haj Committee Act was passed by the Jawahar Lal Nehru-headed Government.

== Nizam's Rubath accommodation ==
The Nizam of Hyderabad had bought a big house for Hajj pilgrims from homeland to stay for free during their visit to Mecca. The government of Telangana performs a draw contest to choose the lucky winners who get to stay in the Rubath (free accommodation). Originally, there were 42 buildings, but only a couple are left after the expansion of the grand mosque of Mecca.

== See also ==
- Haj subsidy
