= Sujit Barman Roy =

Indian Judge

Justice Sujit Barman Roy

20th Chief justice of Odisha High Court
- In office 9 April 2003 – 21 January 2007
- Preceded by: P. K. Balasubramanyan
- Succeeded by: Asok Kumar Ganguly

Personal details
- Born: 28 January 1945
- Education: Visva Bharati University

Sujit Barman Roy (born 28 January 1945) is a retired Indian judge and former Chief Justice of Orissa High Court.

== Career ==
Sujit Barman Roy studied in Patha Bhavana, Santiniketan under the Visva Bharati University. He graduated from Maharaja Bir Bikram College of Tripura. In 1974, he passed LL.B. from Hazra Law College, University of Calcutta and started practice at Agartala Bench under the Gauhati High Court. Barman Roy became the Advocate General of Tripura in 1988. On 14 November 1991 he was appointed a permanent judge of the Gauhati High Court. In 1997 Justice Roy was transferred to the Calcutta High Court, thereafter elevated to the post of Chief Justice of Orissa High Court in 2003. He retired from the post in January 2007.
