= Korati =

Village in Karnataka, India

Korati is a village near Hoskote town which is around 40 kilometres (25 mi) from Bangalore City.
