= Humayun Kabir (Indian National Congress politician) =

Indian politician

Union Minister of Education
- In office 1 September 1963 – 21 November 1963
- Prime Minister: Jawaharlal Nehru
- Preceded by: K. L. Shrimali
- Succeeded by: M. C. Chagla

Personal details
- Born: 22 February 1906 Komarpur, Bengal, British India, (Modern day Faridpur, Bangladesh)
- Died: 18 August 1969 (aged 63) Kolkata, West Bengal, India
- Education: Presidency College, Kolkata; University of Calcutta; Exeter College, Oxford

Humayun Kabir (1906–1969) was an Indian educationist and politician. He was also a poet, essayist and novelist in the Bengali language. He was also a renowned political thinker. He was educated at Exeter College, Oxford and graduated in 1931. Kabir had been heavily involved with the Oxford Union during his student days, having been elected secretary in 1930 and librarian in 1931. He made his farewell speech on the motion: 'This House condemns the Indian policy of His Majesty's Government'. Kabir had also been involved with the student newspapers, the Isis and the Cherwell, and the Oxford Majlis journal, Bharat. Upon his return to India, Kabir taught at a number of universities. He also became involved in trade union politics and was elected to the Bengal Legislative Assembly in 1937. He took up a number of government posts after 1947, including Minister for Education.

Kabir published a book of poems in Oxford in 1932, and continued to write poetry, short stories and novels after his return to India. He also wrote essays and was a well-respected orator. He died in Kolkata in 1969.

== Early life ==
Kabir was born on 22 February 1906 in Komarpur, in the Bengal Presidency of British India. His father, Khan Bahadur Khabeeruddin Ahmed, was a Deputy Magistrate in Bengal. He came first, with star marks, in his matriculation examination in 1922 from Naogaon KD Govt High School. He was educated at Presidency College, Calcutta, completing his Intermediate in Arts (I.A.) in English with first class third, and Calcutta University, where he completed his B.A. (Honours) and M.A. in English with first class first. He won a scholarship to Exeter College, Oxford where he completed his degree in 'Modern Greats', i.e. Philosophy, Political Science, and Economics with a first class in 1931.

== Career ==
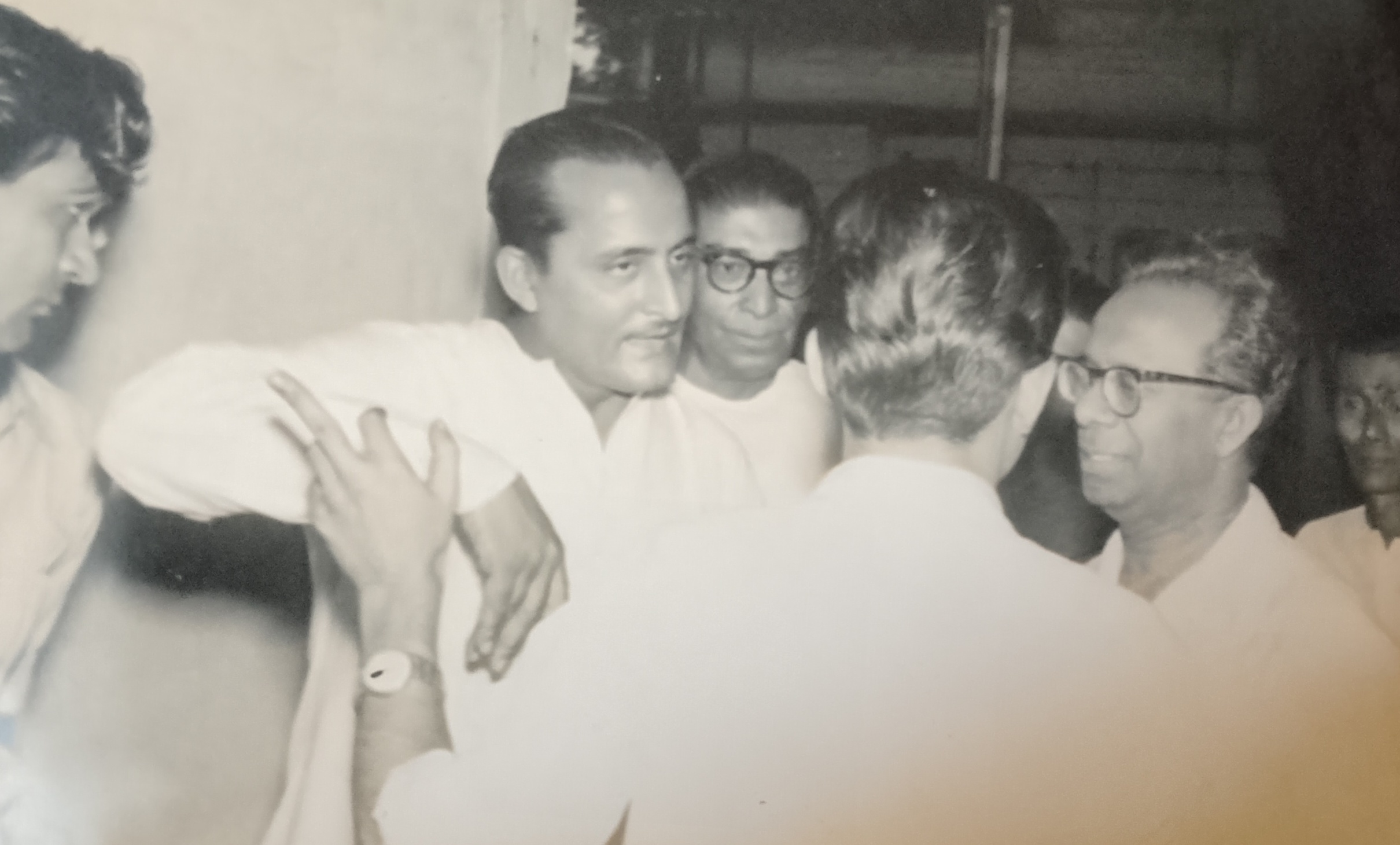
Humayun Kabir (right) and Chittajit Mohan Dhar at Perfect Chemical Industries, Dum Dum, Calcutta.

In 1932, he was invited by Sarvapalli Radhakrishnan to join as a lecturer at the newly established Andhra University. Later, he was a Joint Education Adviser, Education Secretary and then Chairman of the University Grants Commission in Delhi. He was the Minister of State for Civil Aviation, Education Minister of India twice, under the Prime Ministerships of Jawaharlal Nehru and Lal Bahadur Shastri. He was also Scientific Research and Cultural Affairs Minister. In 1965, Indira Gandhi offered him the Madras Governor's post, which he declined. From 1956 to 1962, he was a member of the Rajya Sabha and from 1962 to 1969 he was a member of the Lok Sabha, representing Basirhat constituency in West Bengal.

Kabir was the editor of Maulana Abdul Kalam Azad's biography India Wins Freedom. Azad dictated his biography to him in Urdu, which Kabir translated into English. He was one of the co-drafter of the UNESCO 1950 statement titled The Race Question.

On 9 April 1967, Kabir organised a meeting of Chief Ministers of non-Congress states and other important leaders in Delhi. Bharatiya Kranti Dal was formed in this meeting with Mahamaya Prasad Sinha as its first chairman.

== Personal life ==
Kabir's brothers were referred to as the "famous Kabir brothers of Faridpur". His brothers were Akbar Kabir, Alamgir Kabir, and Firoz Kabir.

Humayun Kabir married Shantilata Dutta, who belonged from a Bengali Brahmo family of Eastern Bengal (now Bangladesh). They had a daughter and a son. His daughter Leila Kabir (d. 15 May 2025) was the wife of Indian politician George Fernandes. His younger brother Jehangir Kabir was a politician in West Bengal, India. His nephew Altamas Kabir was the 39th Chief Justice of India (CJI) and his niece Shukla Kabir Sinha is a judge of the Calcutta High Court.

== Bibliography ==
- Imanuel Kant (1936)
- Sharat Sahityer Multattva (The main theory of the literature of Sharat Chandra Chattopadhyay) (1942)
- Banglar Kavya (The poetry of Bengal) (1945)
- Marxbad (Marxism) (1951)
- Mirza Abu Talib Khan (1961)
- Poetry, Monads and Society (1941)
- Muslim Politics in Bengal (1943)
- Rabindranath Tagore (1945)
- Men and Rivers
- The Unity of Indian Culture
- Svapnasadh
- Sathi
- Ashtadashi
- Nadi O Nari

== Death ==
Humayun Kabir also stayed some part of his life in Gopalpur-On-Sea near Berhampur City in Odisha. George Fernandes was staying at his father-in-law Humayun Kabir's house on the same Gopalpur-On-Sea beach house near Berhampur City just before the announcement of emergency. A warrant was issued in Fernandes' name and subsequently he went underground and hid himself in this house to escape arrest and prosecution. However, Humayun Kabir died on 18 August 1969 in Kolkata, West Bengal, India.
