= Altamas Kabir =

39th Chief Justice of India

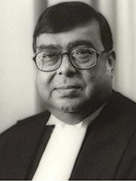
- Official portrait, September 2005.

39th Chief Justice of India
- In office 29 September 2012 – 18 July 2013
- Appointed by: Pranab Mukherjee
- Preceded by: S. H. Kapadia
- Succeeded by: P. Sathasivam

Judge of Supreme Court of India
- In office 9 September 2005 – 29 September 2012
- Nominated by: R. C. Lahoti
- Appointed by: A. P. J. Abdul Kalam

3rd Chief Justice of Jharkhand High Court
- In office 1 March 2005 – 8 September 2005
- Nominated by: R. C. Lahoti
- Appointed by: A. P. J. Abdul Kalam
- Preceded by: P. K. Balasubramanyan; S. J. Mukhopadhaya (acting)
- Succeeded by: Nelavoy Dhinakar; S. J. Mukhopadhaya (acting)

Judge of the Calcutta High Court
- In office 6 August 1990 – 28 February 2005
- Nominated by: Sabyasachi Mukharji
- Appointed by: R. Venkataraman
- Acting Chief Justice
- In office 11 January 2005 – 28 February 2005
- Appointed by: A. P. J. Abdul Kalam
- Preceded by: Ashok Kumar Mathur; Ajoy Nath Ray (acting)
- Succeeded by: V. S. Sirpurkar; A. K. Ganguly (acting)

Personal details
- Born: 19 July 1948 Calcutta (now Kolkata), West Bengal, Dominion of India (present-day India)
- Died: 19 February 2017 (aged 68) Kolkata, West Bengal, India
- Relations: Humayun Kabir (uncle); Khabeeruddin Ahmed (grandfather)
- Parent: Jehangir Kabir
- Education: University of Calcutta

Altamas Kabir (19 July 1948 – 19 February 2017) was an Indian lawyer and judge who served as the 39th Chief Justice of India.

== Early life and education ==
Altamas Kabir was born in Calcutta in 1948, to a Bengali Muslim family from the district of Faridpur (now in Bangladesh). He studied at the Mount Hermon School, Darjeeling, and the Calcutta Boys' School. Impressed by one of his argumentative articles on social issues and their solutions, a teacher at Calcutta Boys' School advised him to pursue a career in law. After graduating with history from Presidency College, then affiliated with the University of Calcutta, he studied law at the University of Calcutta, Kolkata. His father, Jehangir Kabir, was a leading Congress politician and trade union leader from West Bengal who served as the Minister in the B. C. Roy and P. C. Sen ministries and also went on to become a minister in the first non-Congress government in West Bengal in 1967, with Ajoy Kumar Mukherjee as the Chief Minister of West Bengal.

== Career ==
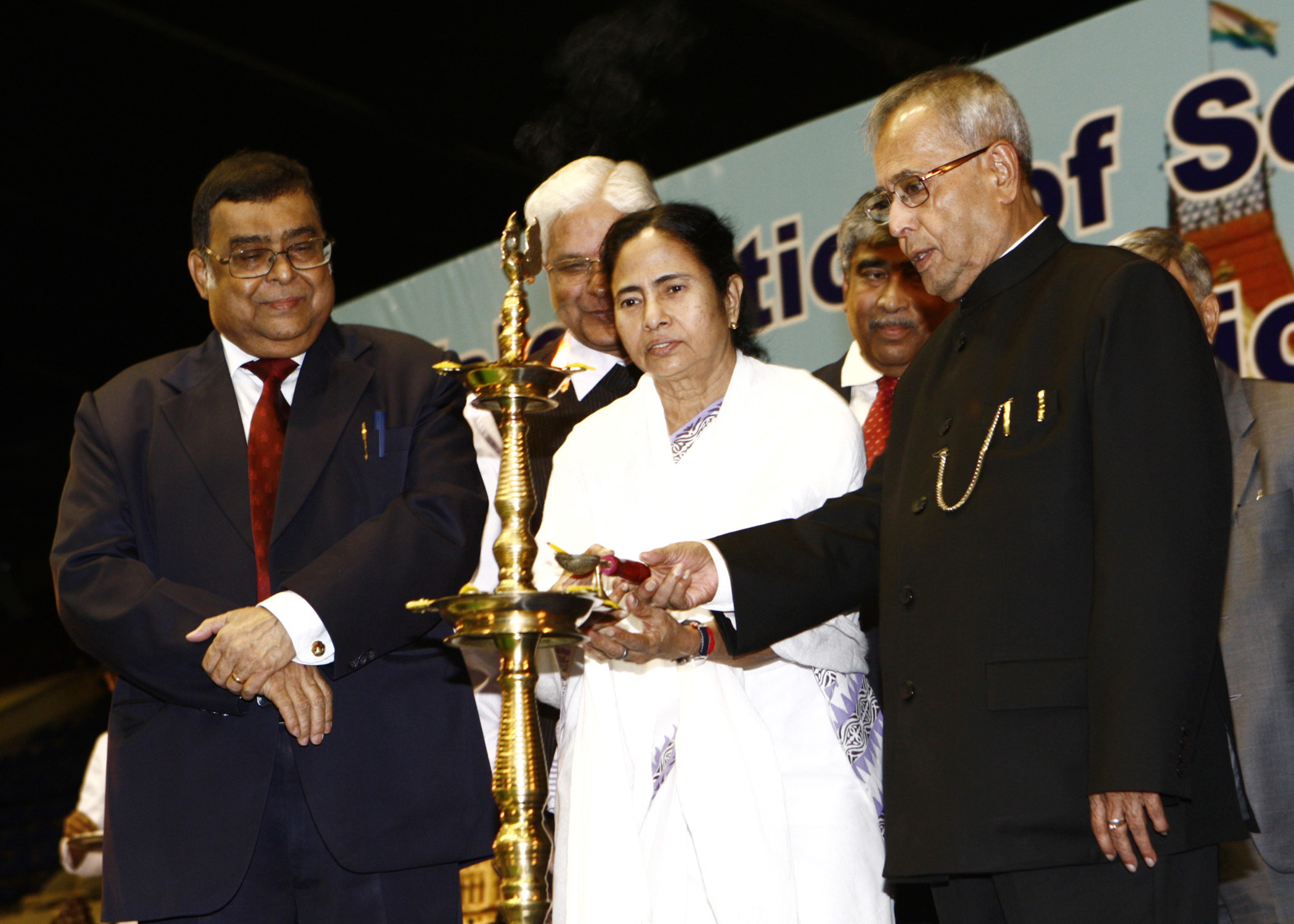
Altamas Kabir (left) with President Pranab Mukherjee at the Valedictory Function of the Sesquicentennial Celebrations of Calcutta High Court.

After completing his M.A. and LL.B. from the University of Calcutta, Kabir was admitted to the bar in 1973, and practiced civil and criminal law in Kolkata at the district court and the Calcutta High Court, Kolkata. He was made a permanent judge of the Calcutta High Court on 6 August 1990. Kabir was appointed to the office of acting Chief Justice of Calcutta High Court on 11 January 2005.

He became the acting chief justice of the Calcutta High Court on 11 January 2005 and served there till his elevation as permanent Chief Justice of Jharkhand High Court on 1 March 2005.

He was elevated to the Supreme Court of India as Justice on 9 September 2005. On 29 September 2012, he became the 39th Chief Justice of India. After a tenure of a little over nine months as CJI, he retired on 18 July 2013. Over the course of his Supreme Court tenure, Kabir authored 362 judgments and sat on 698 benches. During his tenure as chief justice, he was the Chancellor of the West Bengal National University of Juridical Sciences, the Chairman of the General Council of the Gujarat National Law University, and the Visitor of the National Law School of India University.

== Judgements ==
During his tenure as a Supreme Court judge, Kabir delivered several critical judgements, particularly regarding human rights and election laws. One of the most important cases he presided over was that of Sandhya Manoj Wankhede, of Amravati district, in 2011. In this case, the Supreme Court bench, composed of Justices Kabir and Cyriac Joseph, ruled that female relatives of a husband can also be booked under the Domestic Violence Act. Kabir also presided over the contempt case against prominent advocate and (now disbanded) Team Anna member Prashant Bhushan after he alleged that half of the most recent 16 CJIs had been corrupt.

On 8 May 2012, the Supreme Court bench composed of Altamas Kabir and Ranjana Desai ordered the government to end the Haj subsidy by 2022.

On 19 October 2012, Kabir granted bail to journalist Syed Mohammed Ahmed Kazmi, arrested for alleged involvement in an Israeli embassy vehicle blast in which an Israeli diplomat's wife was injured. Pronouncing the order, Kabir said, "We are unable to appreciate the procedure adopted by the Chief Metropolitan Magistrate, which the High Court has endorsed. And we are of the view that the appellant (Kazmi) acquired the right for grant of statutory bail on 17 July 2012, when his custody was held to be illegal by the additional sessions judge."

== Controversies ==
=== Allegations of nepotism ===
In 2013, Kabir, then serving as CJI, became embroiled in a controversy involving his sister, lawyer Shukla Kabir Sinha, and Gujarat High Court Chief Justice Bhaskar Bhattacharya. In a letter to the president, the prime minister, and CJI Kabir, Bhattacharya claimed that, as chief justice and head of the Supreme Court collegium, Kabir had blocked Bhattacharya's elevation to the Supreme Court. Bhattacharya alleged that the reason was his opposition to the appointment of Shukla Kabir Sinha to the bench of the Calcutta High Court while he was a member of that court's collegium in 2010.

On 18 July 2013, in a judgement that was later set aside, a bench headed by Kabir quashed the National Eligibility and Entrance Test for admissions to medical colleges in India. The judgement was set aside by a constitution bench of the Supreme Court.

In July 2013, the Supreme Court collegium stalled Kabir's move to appoint a Supreme Court justice just before his retirement, because a warrant of appointment designating Justice P. Sathasivam as the next chief justice had already been signed, and Kabir's move would have been unprecedented and improper.

In 2016, former Chief Minister and Arunachal Pradesh politician Kalikho Pul claimed, in a suicide note, that Kabir had passed wrong judgements regarding the public distribution system (PDS) scam in the state.

Legal offices
| Preceded by S. H. Kapadia | Chief Justice of India; 29 September 2012 – 18 July 2013 | Succeeded by P Sathasivam |
