= Asok Kumar Ganguly =

Indian jurist (born 1947)

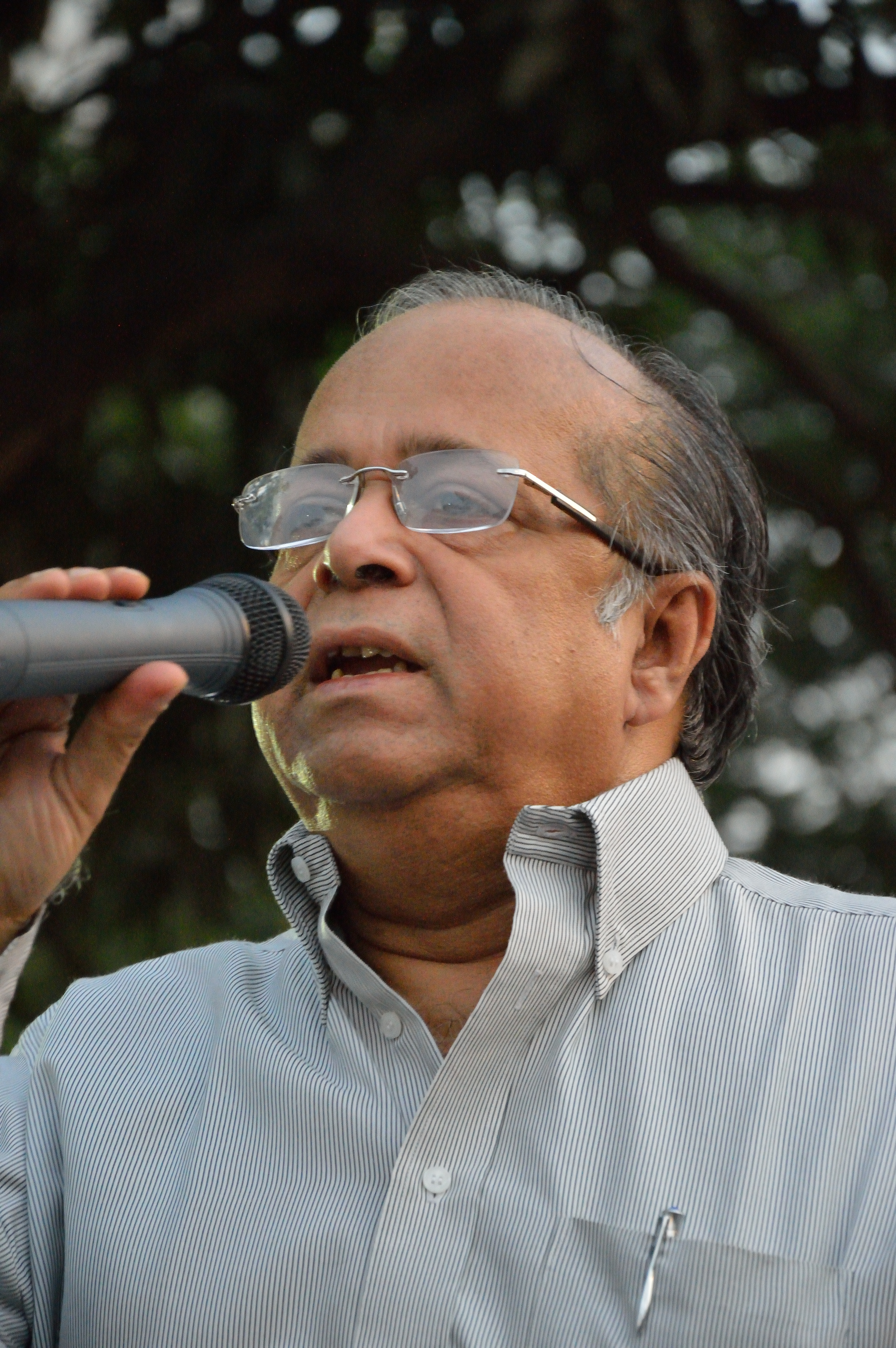
- Ganguly in March 2015

Judge of the Supreme Court of India
- In office 17 December 2008 – 3 February 2012
- Appointed by: President of India

21st Chief Justice of the Odisha High Court
- In office 2 March 2007 – 18 May 2008
- Preceded by: Sujit Barman Roy
- Succeeded by: Balbir Singh Chauhan

Chief Justice of the Madras High Court
- In office 19 May 2008 – December 2008
- Preceded by: Ajit Prakash Shah
- Succeeded by: Hemant Laxman Gokhale

Personal details
- Born: 3 February 1947 (age 79)
- Spouse: Roma Ganguly
- Education: Department of Law, University of Calcutta (MA, LLB)

Asok Kumar Ganguly is an Indian jurist. He served as the chairman of the West Bengal Human Rights Commission and as a judge of the Supreme Court of India who delivered judgements in some high-profile cases like the 2G spectrum case.

== Early life and education ==
Ganguly was born on 3 February 1947. He graduated with a Master of Arts in English from the University of Calcutta in 1968 and received a Bachelor of Laws from the same university in 1970.

== Career ==
He started his career in 1969 by teaching in the same school, Khidderpore Academy where he was once a student. In 1972, he started practice in Calcutta High Court. On 10 January 1994, he was appointed a permanent judge of Calcutta High Court but within three months was transferred to the Patna High Court. After remaining in Patna High Court for more than six years, he was transferred back to Calcutta High Court on 1 August 2000. There he subsequently became the senior most puisne judge in March 2005. He functioned twice as acting Chief Justice of Calcutta High Court. Later he was transferred to the Orissa High Court where he joined as the senior most puisne judge on 21 April 2006. On 2 March 2007 he took oath as Chief Justice of Orissa. He joined the Madras High Court as chief justice on 19 May 2008. Later he was elevated to the Supreme Court of India where he joined on 17 December 2008 and remained on the court for more than 3 years. He retired on 3 February 2012. Post his retirement, Ganguly worked as guest faculty at National University of Juridical Sciences, Kolkata. He also went on to be the chairperson of the West Bengal Human Rights commission, where his role was highly appreciated.

== Notable judgements ==
- 2G spectrum case – On 2 February 2012 the bench of Justice AK Ganguly & Justice GS Singhvi quashed 122 2G licenses issued in the year 2008 by A. Raja, then "Union Telecom Minister".
- The Emergency – In a judgement, Justice AK Ganguly observed that in 1975 during the emergency period of India, Supreme Court of India had violated the fundamental rights of the Indian citizens. In the ADM Jabalpur vs Shivakant Shukla case (1976). A bench of Justices Aftab Alam and Ganguly took the view that the majority decision of a five-member Constitution Bench upholding the suspension of fundamental rights during "Emergency" was erroneous.
- President's power of pardon – The President of India can grant a pardon to or reduce the sentence of a convicted person for one time, particularly in cases involving punishment of death but in a judgement delivered by Justice Ganguly said that the president or the governor exercising the power of pardon in granting remission of sentence to a convict could not encroach into the judicial domain and give a finding on the guilt of the convict. If such a power was exercised arbitrarily, mala fide or in absolute disregard of the finer canons of the constitutionalism, the by-product order could not get the approval of law and in such cases, the judicial hand must be stretched to it.
- Imposed Rs. 1 million fine on Maharashtra state govt. – In a judgement delivered on 14 December 2010 by Justice Ganguly, as a Supreme Court Judge, he imposed Rs. 1 million fine on Maharashtra state government on a complaint that the then chief minister Vilasrao Deshmukh influenced police against registering an FIR against MLA Dilip Kumar Sananda. The court said that "The (former) chief minister should not have interfered with the criminal justice system." Observing that the message conveyed in this case is "extremely shocking", the court directed that the fine amount collected should be used for the welfare of the distressed farmers. It was alleged that then Chief Minister Vilasrao Deshmukh's personal secretary Amba Das had called up the then district superintendent of police (SP) to inform that the chief minister did not want any FIR to be registered in the case. Accordingly, the SP asked his subordinates not to register any FIR but reportedly recorded the same in its file. Aggrieved by the refusal of the police to register an FIR, the victims approached the Bombay High Court which, apart from ordering registration of an FIR, also imposed a fine of Rs 25,000 on the state. But the state govt challenged Bombay High Court's verdict in Supreme Court of India.
- In a judgement on 6 July 2011, the bench of Justice Ganguly along with Justice GS Singhvi ordered that entire 156 hectares of land be given back to the robbed farmers. The government had acquired the land for "development" but was handed over to builders for making commercial and residential complexes. The bench imposed a fine of ₹1 million (US$10,000) Greater Noida Industrial Development Authority (GNIDA) for its illegal act.

== Controversies ==
=== Allegations of sexual misconduct ===
A woman intern had alleged a recently retired Supreme Court judge had sexually assaulted and sexually harassed her. The Supreme Court, then appointed a three-member committee to probe the allegations and identified A K Ganguly was the one who harassed her. He repeatedly denied all charges. He was indicted on 6 December 2013 by the committee, which agreed with the intern's allegation that he had subjected her to "unwelcome sexual behaviour" in December 2012. He resigned from the West Bengal Human Rights Commission on 6 January 2014 after the Union Cabinet decided to make a Presidential Reference on 2 January 2014 to the Supreme Court for his removal.

He was acquitted of all charges after the intern refused to record her statement before the police.
