= Rajesh Kumar Agrawal =

Indian judge (born 1953)

8th President of the National Consumer Disputes Redressal Commission
- In office 1 July 2018 – 2 July 2023
- Appointed by: Ram Nath Kovind
- Succeeded by: Amreshwar Pratap Sahi

Judge of the Supreme Court of India
- In office 17 February 2014 – 4 May 2018
- Nominated by: Collegium of the Supreme Court of India
- Appointed by: Pranab Mukherjee

45th Chief Justice of Madras High Court
- In office 24 October 2013 – 16 February 2014
- Nominated by: Palanisamy Sathasivam
- Appointed by: Pranab Mukherjee
- Preceded by: M. Y. Eqbal
- Succeeded by: Satish Agnihotri (acting)

Personal details
- Born: 5 May 1953 (age 73) Uttar Pradesh, India
- Education: University of Allahabad

Rajesh Kumar Agrawal (born 5 May 1953) is an Indian former judge of the Supreme Court of India and former president of the National Consumer Disputes Redressal Commission (NCDRC).

He retired from the Supreme Court on 4 May 2018 and was appointed the president of the NCDRC on 1 July 2018 & continued until 2 July 2023. He served as the chief justice of the Madras High Court from 24 October 2013 until his elevation to the Supreme Court on 17 February 2014, having assumed the role of acting chief justice of the Madras High Court after his predecessor, M. Y. Eqbal, became a judge of the Supreme Court on 7 February 2013.

Agrawal started practicing law in 1976, having joined the chambers of his father Raja Ram Agrawal, a Senior Advocate and former Advocate General for the State of Uttar Pradesh. He was elevated as a permanent judge of the Allahabad High Court on 5 February 1999, where he served until his transfer to the Madras High Court as the acting chief justice on 6 February 2013.
