= Jehangir Kabir =

Indian politician and trade union leader

- জাহাঙ্গীর কবির
- Born: 26 April 1910; Faridpur, East Bengal, British India
- Died: 1981 (aged 70–71); Kolkata, India
- Education: Calcutta University
- Children: Altamas Kabir; Shukla Kabir Sinha
- Father: Khabeeruddin Ahmed

Jehangir Kabir (26 April 1910 – 1981) was an Indian Bengali politician and trade union leader.

Jehangir Kabir was born on 26 April 1910 in Faridpur, East Bengal (now Bangladesh) to Khabeeruddin Ahmed. Indian educationist Humayun Kabir was Jehangir's elder brother.

He completed a Bachelor of Laws from Calcutta University. He left the practice of law during the Quit India Movement in 1942, and became a trade union leader. He and his family settled in Calcutta in 1947, the year of the Partition of India.

A long-time member of the Indian National Congress party, he represented the Haroa constituency in the West Bengal Legislative Assembly.

In summer 1966, he broke away from Congress, taking many of his co-coreligionists with him, to join the new Bangla Congress party. He became West Bengal's Minister for Planning and Development in Ajoy Mukherjee's United Front ministry. In January 1968, he split from the Bangla Congress and formed the Bangla Jatiya Dal (National Party of Bengal).

Kabir died in 1981 in Calcutta.

== Personal life ==
His son Justice Altamas Kabir was the 39th Chief Justice of the Supreme Court of India, while a daughter Shukla Kabir Sinha is a retired judge of the Calcutta High Court.
