= Khushi Kabir =

Bangladeshi activist

Khushi Kabir is a Bangladeshi social activist, feminist, and environmentalist.

== Early life ==
Khushi Kabir graduated from the Faculty of Fine Arts of University of Dhaka in Fine Arts (Painting and Drawing).

== Career ==
In 1972, after the Bangladesh Liberation war, Khushi Kabir joined a Bangladeshi Non-governmental organization. She worked in rural areas of Bangladesh with marginalized communities. She joined the Non-governmental rights organisation Nijera Kori as a coordinator. Nijera Kori is one of the largest Non-governmental organizations in Bangladesh has 237787 members in the country. She is a member of the International Chittagong Hill Tracts Commission. She is director of the Centre for Policy Dialogue. She coordinated the One Billion Rising in 2013 in Bangladesh.

Khushi Kabir had spoken against the acquisition of land for Bangladesh Army camps and installations. She was awarded the Lifetime Achievement Awards at the 14th biennial the regional conference of the Zonta District-25 in 2015. A defamation case was filed against her for harming the image of Prime Minister Sheikh Hasina, the case was dismissed by Bangladesh High Court due to lack of specification in the complaint on 4 June 2016. On 27 November 2017 she spoke against the religion based violence against minorities in Bangladesh and called for the government to do more to protect minorities. She has called for the implementation of Chittagong Hill Tracts Peace Accord signed in 1997.
