= M. N. Venkatachaliah =

25th Chief Justice of India

Manepalli Venkatachaliah
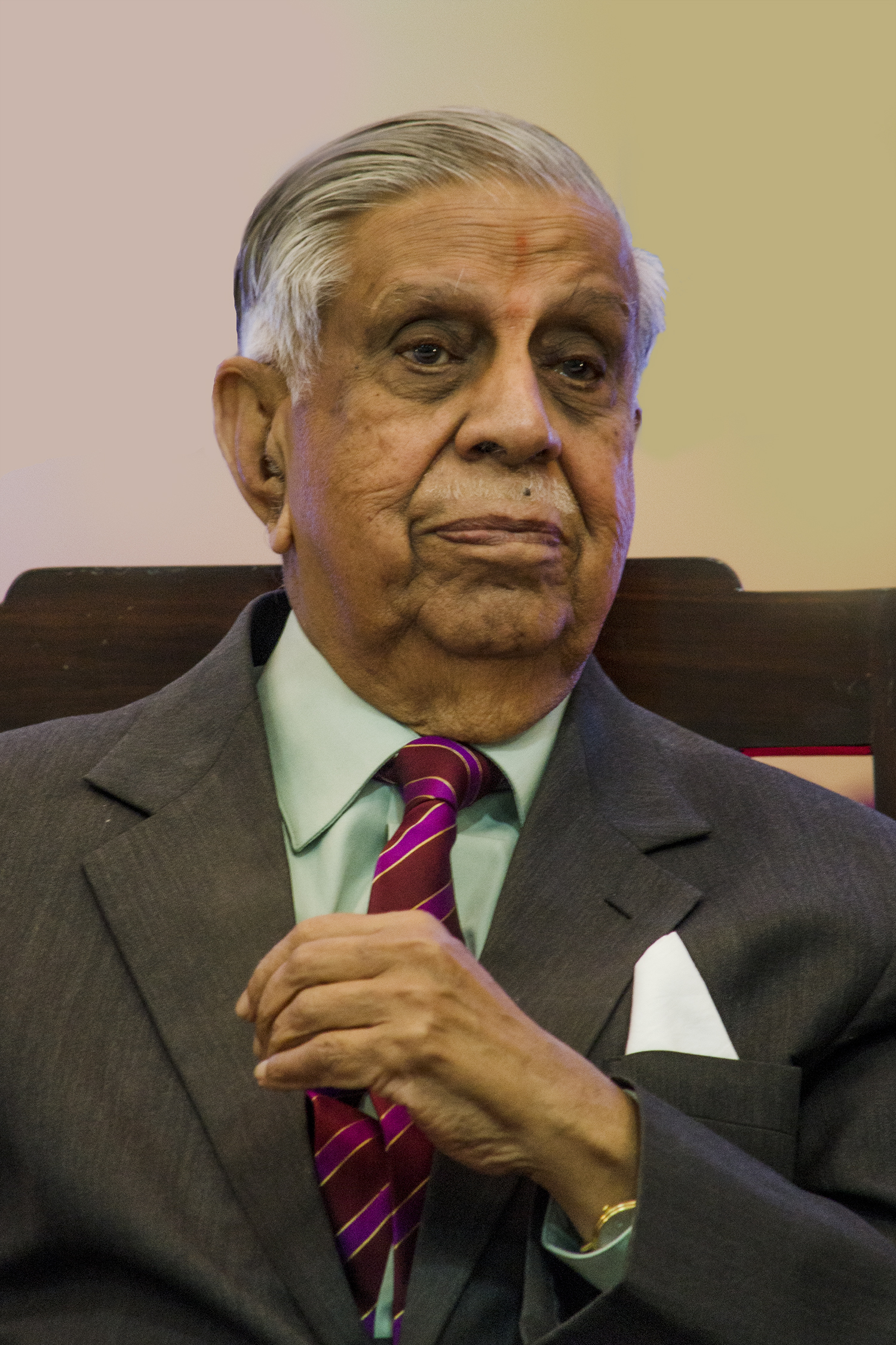

25th Chief Justice of India
- In office 12 February 1993 – 24 October 1994
- Appointed by: Shankar Dayal Sharma
- Preceded by: L.M. Sharma
- Succeeded by: A.M. Ahmadi

2nd Chairman National Human Rights Commission
- In office 26 November 1996 – 24 October 1999

Personal details
- Born: 25 October 1929 (age 96)
- Spouse: Parvathi Venkatachaliah

Manepalli Narayanarao Venkatachaliah (born 25 October 1929) is an Indian jurist, who served as the 25th Chief Justice of India, serving from 1993 to 1994. He also previously served as the Chancellor of Sri Sathya Sai Institute of Higher Learning (Deemed University) and on the advisory board of Foundation for Restoration of National Values, a society established in 2008 that strives to restore "national and cultural values" of India.

He earned Bachelor of Science from University of Mysore and Bachelor Bachelor of Laws from the Bangalore University. He started practicing law in 1951. He was appointed Permanent Judge of the High Court of Karnataka on 6 November 1975. He was elevated as Judge of the Supreme Court of India on 5 October 1987. Finally, he became the 25th Chief Justice of India on 12 February 1993 and subsequently retired on 24 October 1994.

Over the course of his Supreme Court tenure, Venkatachaliah authored 90 judgments and sat on 482 benches.

Post retirement, he has continued to work on anti-corruption and human rights issues, including support for the launch of the Initiatives of Change Centre for Governance in 2003.

He served as the Chairman of National Human Rights Commission from 1996-1998 and in 2000 he headed National Commission to review the working of the Constitution.

He is currently serving as the chancellor of the Sri Sathya Sai Institute of Higher Learning, Prasanthi Nilayam.

== Honours ==
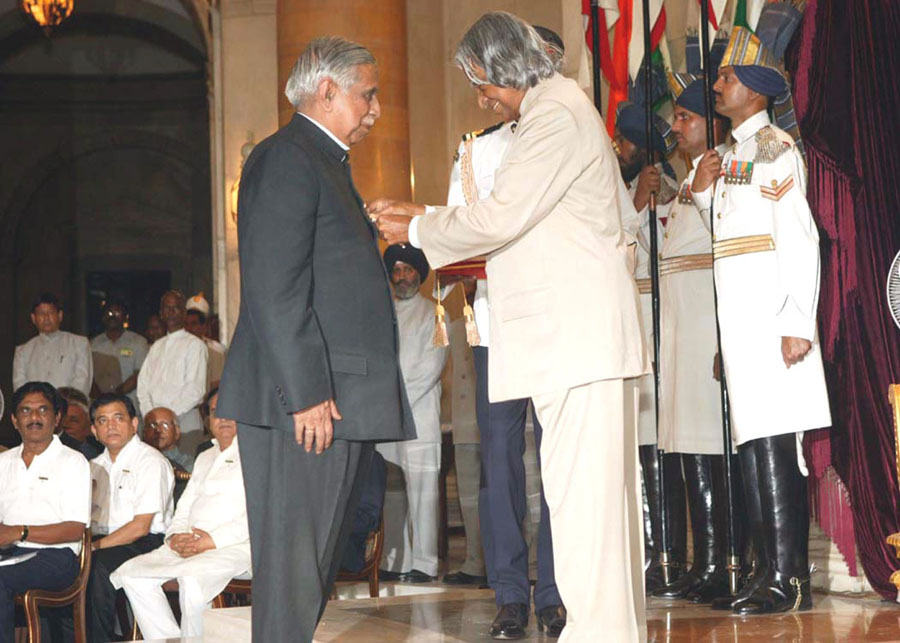
The President Dr. A.P.J Abdul Kalam presenting Padma Vibhushan Award to Justice (Retd.) Shri M. N. Venkatachaliah at an investiture Ceremony at Rashtrapati Bhawan in New Delhi on June 30, 2004

- Padma Vibhushan - India's Second Highest Civilian Honour from the President of India in 2004.
- Doctor of Letters (honoris causa) - Pondicherry University
- Doctor of Laws (LL.D) (honoris causa) - Manipal University
- Honorary Doctorate from Rani Channamma University, Belagavi

Legal offices
Preceded by Lalit Mohan Sharma	Chief Justice of India; 12 February 1993–24 October 1994	Succeeded by Aziz Mushabber Ahmadi
