= Aziz Mushabber Ahmadi =

26th Chief Justice of India (1932–2023)

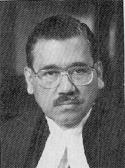

26th Chief Justice of India
- In office 25 October 1994 – 24 March 1997
- Nominated by: none (per convention as he was the senior most judge)
- Appointed by: Shankar Dayal Sharma
- Preceded by: M. N. Venkatachaliah
- Succeeded by: J. S. Verma

Chancellor, Aligarh Muslim University
- In office 2003–2010
- Preceded by: Syedna Mohammed Burhanuddin
- Succeeded by: Syedna Mufaddal Saifuddin

Personal details
- Born: 25 March 1932 Surat, Bombay Presidency, British India
- Died: 2 March 2023 (aged 90)
- Spouse: Amena Ahmadi
- Children: 2

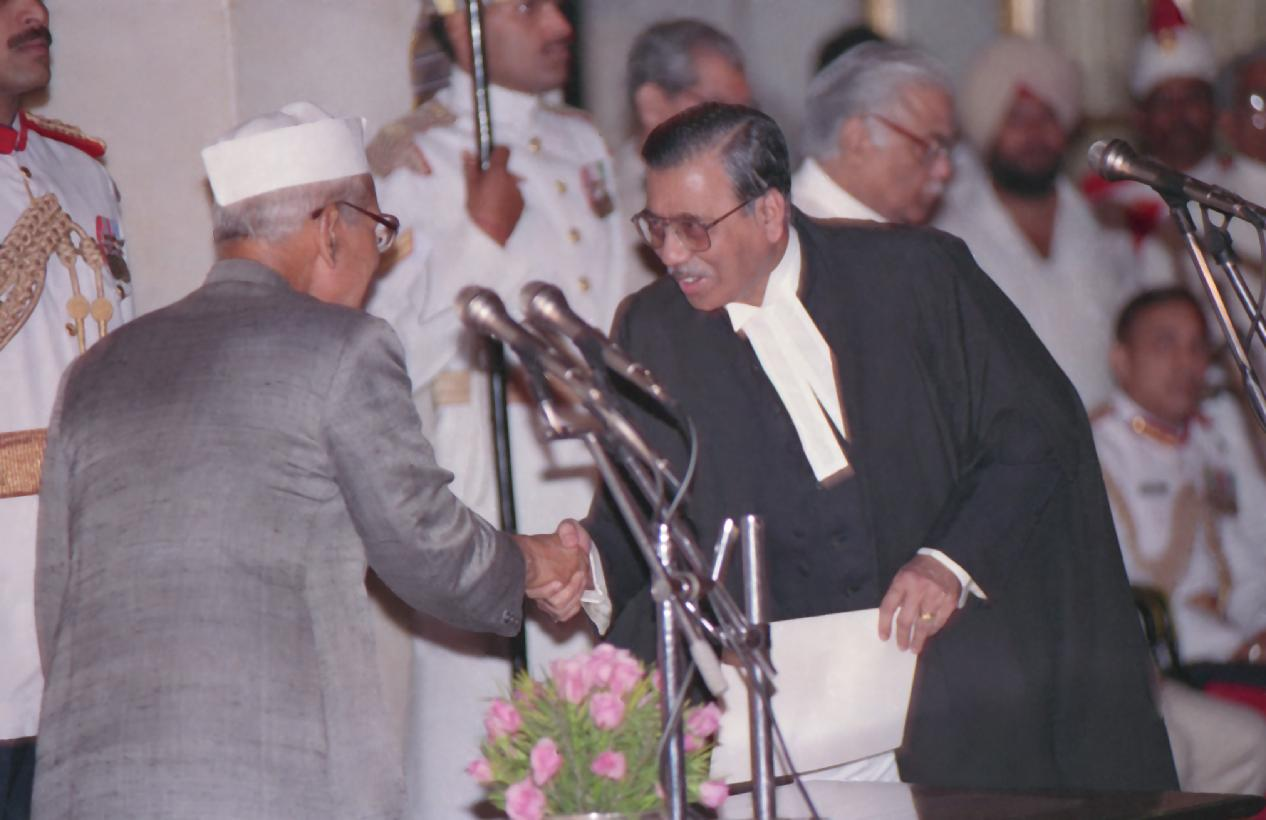
Shankar Dayal Sharma and Aziz Mushabber Ahmadi

Aziz Mushabber Ahmadi (25 March 1932 – 2 March 2023) was an Indian judge who was the 26th Chief Justice of India. After serving as a judge in the Gujarat High Court, Ahmadi was appointed judge to the Supreme Court in 1988. He was Chief Justice of India from 1994 to 1997. He served as chancellor at the Aligarh Muslim University for two terms.

== Judicial career ==
Having received Bachelor of Laws (LL.B.), Ahmadi joined the bar in 1954. He eventually was appointed judge to the City Civil & Sessions Court of Ahmedabad in 1964. During this time, Ahmadi was appointed secretary of the legal affairs of the state of Gujarat in 1974, which soon led to an appointment as judge of the Gujarat High Court in 1976.

As judge of the Gujarat High Court, Ahmadi worked as chairman of various advisory boards for:

- Conservation of Foreign Exchange and Prevention of Smuggling Activities
- Prevention of Black Marketing
- Maintenance of Supplies of Essential Commodities.

He worked as a member of the Ravi & Beas Waters Disputes Tribunal under the Rajiv-Longowal Settlement (Punjab Settlement).

Ultimately this led to an appointment as a justice in the Supreme Court of India in December 1988. After six years, Ahmadi was appointed Chief Justice of India in October 1994. Ahmadi became the third Muslim ever to serve as Chief Justice of India. Over the course of his Supreme Court tenure, Ahmadi authored 232 judgments and sat on 811 benches. After serving for two and a half years, he retired in March 1997.

== Foreign recognition ==
Among many recognitions include:

- Member of the American Inns of Court (May 1995)
- Honorary Master Bencher of the Honourable Society of Middle Temple, London (November 1996)
- Degree of Doctor of Laws (Honoris Causa) conferred by University of Leicester, England. (July 1998)
- Nominated on International Committees:
  - Human Rights violation in East Timor (United Nations)
  - To assist the judiciary in Liberia (International Court of Justice)
  - To review the state of relations between the judiciary, the legal profession, and the executive and violation of human rights in Zimbabwe (International Bar Association)

== Post-Retirement career ==
=== Chancellor at Aligarh ===
After stepping down from the supreme court, Ahmadi became chancellor of Aligarh Muslim University. In 2007, Ahmadi was re-elected chancellor of Aligarh for three years.

After entering academia, he was invited to speak at various universities and forums worldwide. Particularly in India, he used his status to speak out on political issues such as minority rights.

=== Muslim Rights ===
Using his status, Ahmadi also continued to speak out for Muslim rights in India, himself being a Muslim from the Dawoodi Bohra community. He remained active in Indian politics as an advocate of minority rights, latterly through a book entitled A Guide To Uplift Minorities by the city-based Human Welfare Trust .

Putting emphasis on education, Ahmadi frequently mentioned that the vast Muslim population of India struggled to put children in school. He encouraged federal and state governments to solve this problem, stating that, "the country simply cannot afford to have a certain percentage of population unable to contribute to the country's development."

=== Arbitrations ===
Ahmadi was a sought-after arbitrator in high-value domestic as well as international arbitration matters.

== Death ==
Ahmadi died on 2 March 2023, at the age of 91.

Legal offices
| Preceded by Manepalli Narayana Rao Venkatachaliah | Chief Justice of India; 25 October 1994 – 24 March 1997 | Succeeded by Jagdish Sharan Verma |
