= Ajit Prakash Shah =

Indian judge (born 1948)

Honourable Chief Justice Ajit Prakash Shah
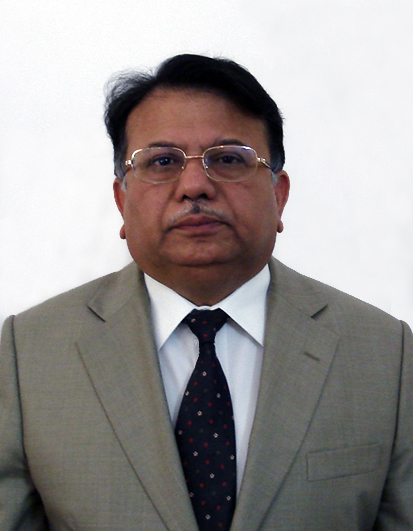

Chief Justice of Delhi High Court
- In office May 2008 – February 2010

Personal details
- Born: Ajit Prakash Shah

Ajit Prakash Shah (born 13 February 1948 at Solapur) is a retired Indian judge and former chairman of the 20th Law Commission of India. He was the Chief Justice of Delhi High Court from May 2008 till his retirement in February 2010.

Justice Shah did his graduation from Solapur and attended Government Law College, Mumbai for his law degree. After a short span of practice at the Solapur District Court, he shifted to the Bombay High Court in 1977 and joined the chambers of the then-leading Advocate Shri S.C. Pratap. He gained experience in civil, constitutional, service and labour matters.

Justice Shah was appointed Additional Judge of Bombay High Court on 18 December 1992 and became a permanent Judge on 8 April 1994. He assumed charge as the Chief Justice of Madras High Court on 12 November 2005 and was transferred as the Chief Justice of Delhi High Court on 7 May 2008.

Since June 2011, Justice Shah has been the Chairperson of Broadcasting Content Complaints Council (BCCC), the self-regulatory body for non-news general entertainment channels (GECs) set up by the Indian Broadcasting Foundation (IBF).

== RIL rejects Shah committee in ONGC dispute ==
On 11 January 2016, Reliance Industries (RIL) disputed the jurisdiction of a panel headed by Shah in the RIL-ONGC dispute. It challenged the oil ministry's decision to intervene in the dispute by setting up the panel, headed by Justice AP Shah. At the first meeting of the panel on 31 December, RIL and its partner Niko stated they would boycott its proceedings.
