= Telangana High Court =

High Court for the Indian State Telangana

High Court for the State of Telangana
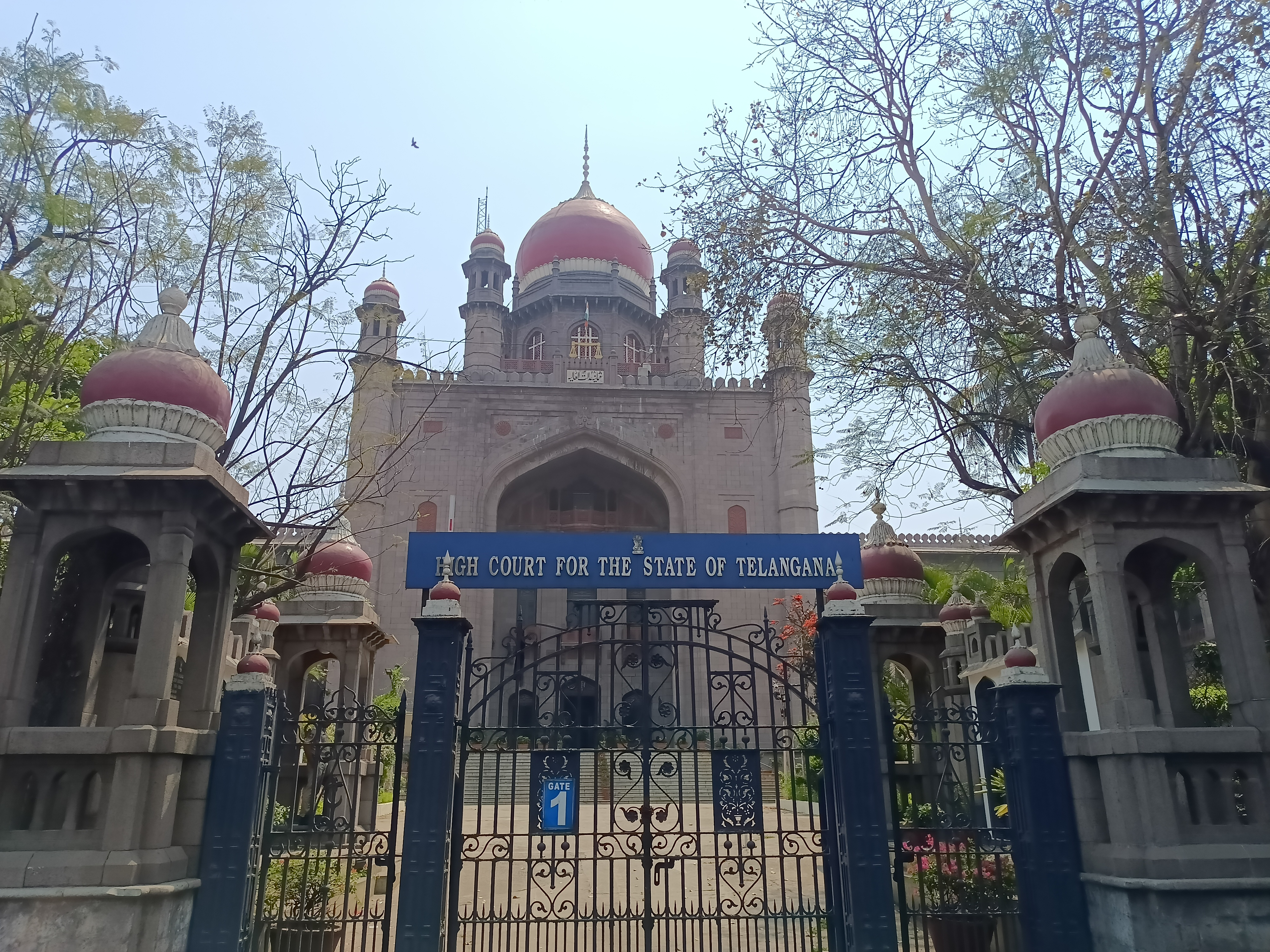
- Telangana State High Court Building
- Interactive map of High Court for the State of Telangana
- 17.369181°N 78.472039°E
- Established: 1 January 2019 (7 years ago)
- Jurisdiction: Telangana
- Location: Hyderabad, Telangana
- Coordinates: 17.369181°N 78.472039°E
- Composition method: Executive selection subject to qualification
- Authorised by: Constitution of India & Andhra Pradesh Reorganization Act, 2014
- Judge term length: mandatory retirement by age of 62
- Number of positions: 42 {Permanent 32; Addl. 10}
- Website: tshc.gov.in

Chief Justice
- Currently: Aparesh Kumar Singh
- Since: 19 July 2025

The Telangana High Court is the High Court for the Indian state of Telangana. Founded by the 7th Nizam of Hyderabad Mir Osman Ali Khan, It was established as the High Court for the erstwhile Hyderabad State and in November 1956 after the formation of Andhra Pradesh renamed as High Court of Andhra Pradesh. In 2014, after the bifurcation of Andhra Pradesh, the court was again renamed as High Court of Judicature at Hyderabad.

The President of India, on 26 December 2018, issued orders bifurcating the High Court of Judicature at Hyderabad into High Court for the State of Telangana with the principal seat at Hyderabad and the High Court of Andhra Pradesh, with the principal seat at Amaravati. The bifurcation and the constitution of separate High Courts for Telangana and Andhra Pradesh came into effect from 1 January 2019.

From 2 June 2014, after the Andhra Pradesh Reorganisation Act, 2014 came into force, the court was renamed and served as a common high court for both of the states until 1 January 2019. A separate high court was established for Andhra Pradesh and inaugurated on 1 January 2019 and it was named as Andhra Pradesh High Court.

The Telangana High Court, which has its seat in Hyderabad, has a total sanctioned strength of 42 judges, comprising 32 permanent judges and 10 additional judges.

Since July 2025, Aparesh Kumar Singh has been serving as the Chief Justice of Telangana High Court.

A new building for the High Court is under construction at a site spanning 100 acres at Budvel, Rajendranagar, in Ranga Reddy district, Telangana.

== History of the judiciary ==
The court during the Nizam era was known as Adalatul Aaliya Osmania (Higher court of Osman Ali Khan) and on 5 November 1956, after Andhra Pradesh was formed under the States Reorganisation Act 1956 it was renamed as ‘High Court of Andhra Pradesh’. On 1 January 2019, the High Court was bifurcated into Andhra Pradesh High Court and Telangana High Court after the formation of the state of Telangana.

== History of the High Court building ==
The High Court building today stands on the south bank of the River Musi. Built in red and white stones in Indo-Saracenic style, the court building is one of the finest buildings in the city. The construction was started under Nizam VII Mir Osman Ali Khan, then ruler of Hyderabad.

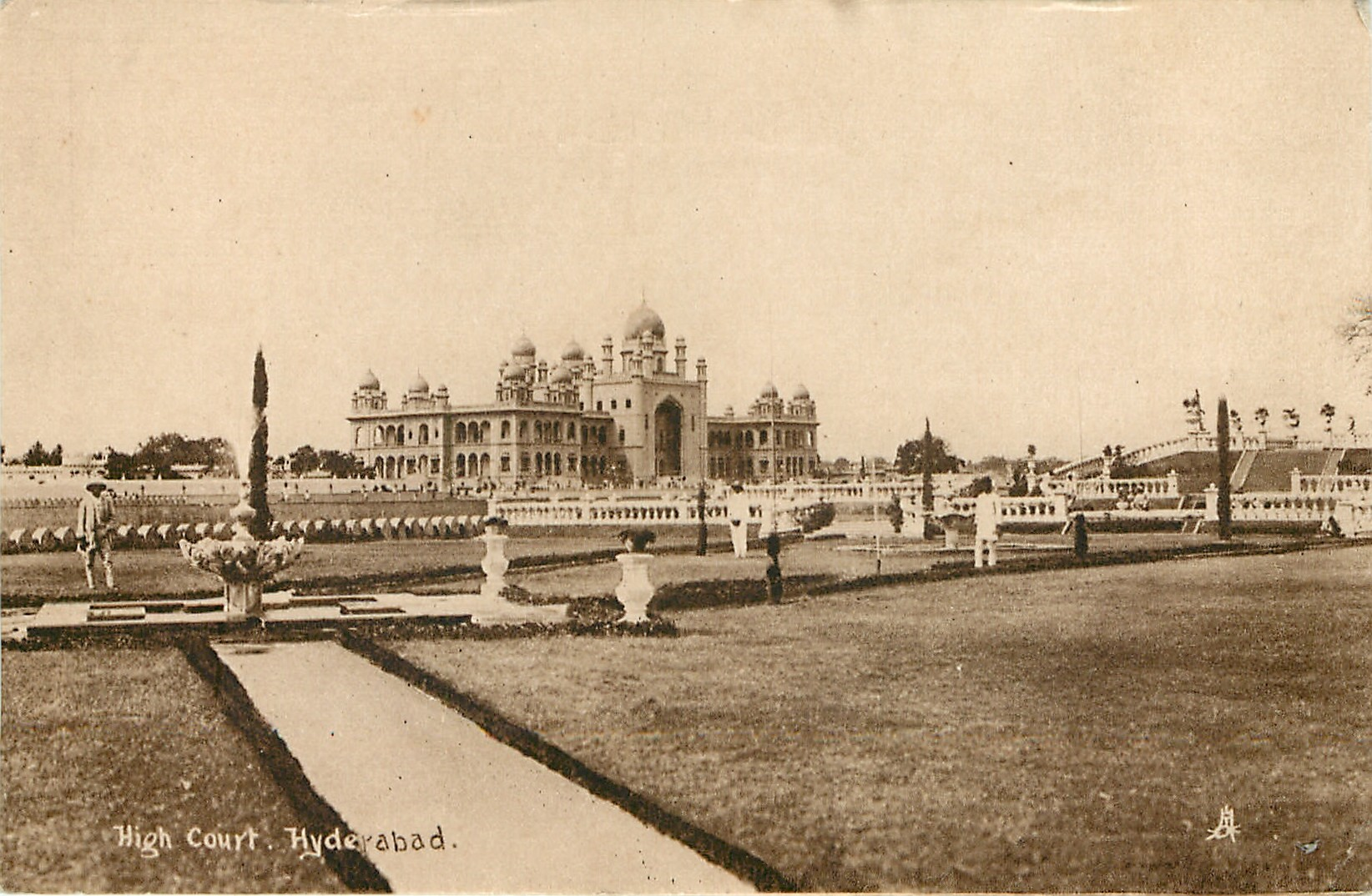
View of the High Court in early 20th century

The High Court functioned from five different locations, before the present location was finalised. The court was earlier located at Pathergatti. In 1909 it was shifted to the residence of Nawab Sir Asman Jah. Later in 1912, the court was shifted to Public Gardens and within 4 months it was once again shifted to the residence of Nawab Nawab Salar Jung Bahadur, at Chatta Bazaar. In 1914, the court was once again shifted to the residence of Nawab Sartaj Jung at Saifabad. During this period the construction of the present building was started and the court shifted to its new location in 1919. The building could accommodate six judges besides accommodation for the office staff, record rooms, and advocates' hall. As number of judges increased a second building was built in 1958 and later in 1978, third building was added. In 2023, it was proposed to shift the court to a new building to be constructed at Rajendranagar.

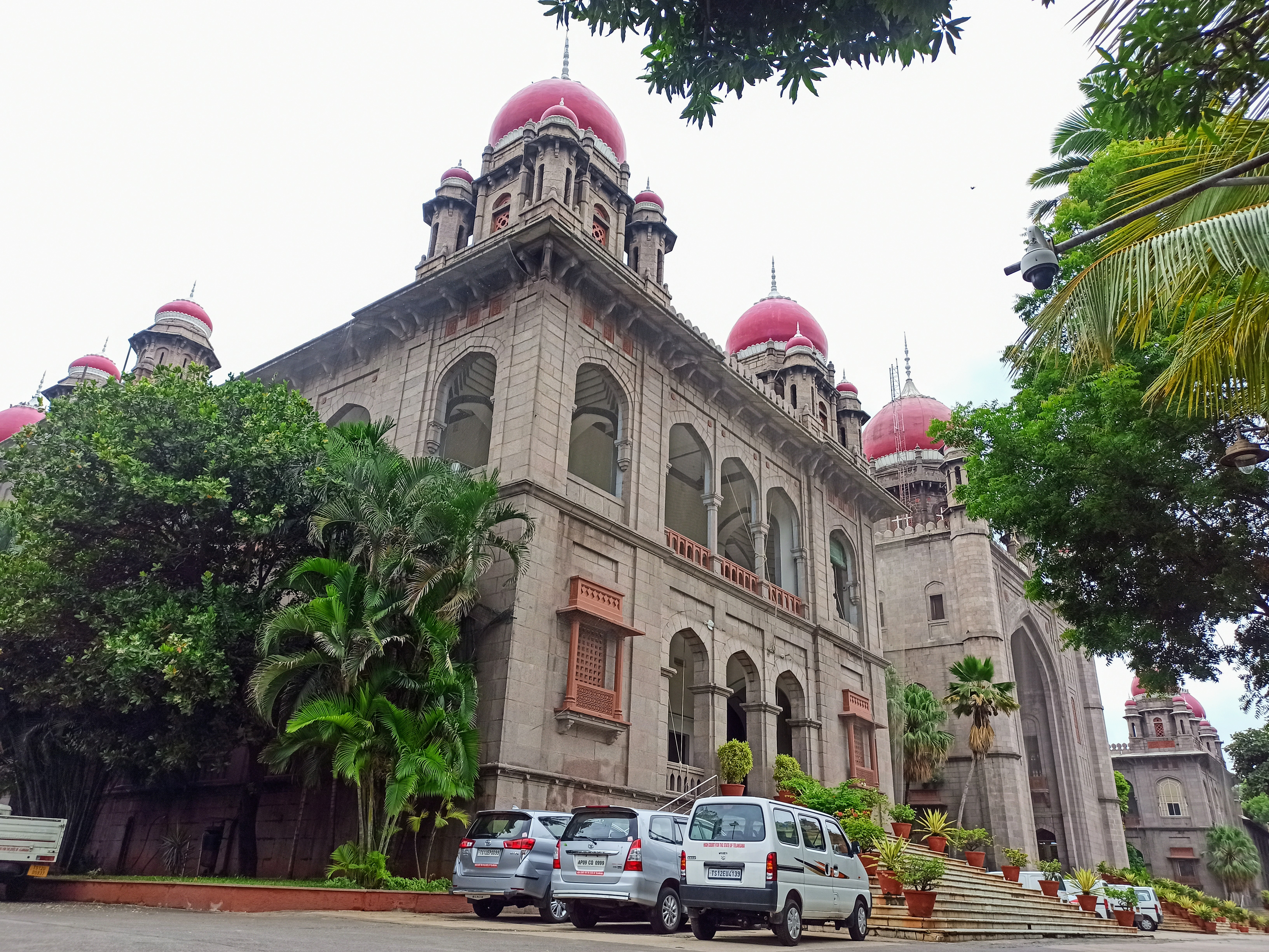
View of the High Court in 2024

The plan of the High Court was drawn up by Shankar Lal of Jaipur and the local engineer who executed the design was Mehar Ali Fazil. Its chief engineer was Nawab Khan Bahadur Mirza Akbar Baig. The High Court was built on the ruins of the Qutb Shahi palaces, Hina Mahal and Nadi Mahal. The construction started on 15 April 1915 and was completed on 31 March 1919. On 20 April 1920, the high court building was inaugurated by the seventh Nizam Mir Osman Ali Khan.

In 1944, on the occasion of the silver jubilee celebrations a silver model of the high court weighing about 300 kg was presented to the Nizam VII Mir Osman Ali Khan by the judiciary. The model is now in the Nizam's Museum in Purani Haveli.

The High Court building has been included in the list of heritage structures compiled by INTACH. World Monuments Fund has included the building in 2025 World Monuments Watch.

=== After the formation of Andhra Pradesh ===
When the High Court of Andhra Pradesh was formed in 1956 as a consequence of States Reorganisation Act, the number of judges was increased to 12. The existing accommodation was inadequate to meet the requirements of the larger High Court and so the additional building was constructed in 1958–59. The entire office rooms, record rooms, chambers of advocates (42 in all) and the rooms for law officers were located in this building. The record rooms, Officer rooms in the main building were modified to provide chambers and Court Hall accommodation for 14 Judges.

=== Construction of Annexe ===
By 1970, the institution of cases of the High Court has gone up to 35,000 as against 20,000 in 1958. The number of judges increased from 14 to 32. To provide additional accommodation for judges, staff, advocates and law officers, the third building was proposed and the work was completed in 1976. The law officers strength was increased from 8 to 18 by 1980 and the institution of cases had gone up to 55,593 cases. In 1979 a plan was drawn for the four-storey annexe building and due to lack of funds that could not be taken up. There are currently 32 court halls and 38 chambers located in the High Court main building and annexe buildings. The present building for which the foundation stone is being laid by the Chief Justice will have eight court halls and eight chambers for the judges. Some of the court halls located in the verandahs and in the office rooms will be restored to their original position. The institution of cases had risen from 20,078 from 1958 to 1982, 123 including miscellaneous cases in 1985. The pending cases in the High Court as on 24 July 1987 was 84,855 (i.e., 66,276 main cases + 18,579 miscellaneous cases). After the completion of this building, the main building and annexes buildings can locate 32 court halls and 38 chambers.

=== 2009 Major fire ===
On 31 August 2009 a major accidental fire broke out through the building reportedly causing severe damage to the library housing rare England law reports, Privy Council journals and a life-size portrait of the Nizam and portraits of judges. However, the records of the court are reportedly safe. The structural integrity of the building also may have been compromised.

== The Judges ==
The Telangana High Court sits at Hyderabad and has jurisdiction over the state of Telangana. It may have a maximum of 42 judges of which 32 may be permanently appointed and 10 may be additionally appointed. Currently, it has 29 judges.

=== Judges of the Telangana High Court Serving on Transfer in Other Courts ===
#	Judges	Source	Date of Joining	Date of Retirement	Current High Court
1	M. S. Ramachandra Rao	Bar	29 June 2012	6 August 2028	Tripura High Court
2	Todupunuri Amarnath Goud	Bar	21 September 2017	28 February 2027	Tripura High Court
3	T. Vinod Kumar	Bar	26 August 2019	16 November 2026	Madras High Court
4	Annireddy Abhishek Reddy	Bar	26 August 2019	6 November 2029	Patna High Court
5	Perugu Sree Sudha	Judicial Service	15 October 2021	5 June 2029	Karnataka High Court
6	Chillakur Sumalatha	Judicial Service	15 October 2021	4 February 2034	Karnataka High Court
7	Munnuri Laxman	Judicial Service	15 October 2021	24 December 2027	Rajasthan High Court
8	Kasoju Surendhar	Bar	24 March 2022	10 January 2030	Madras High Court
9	Mummineni Sudheer Kumar	Bar	24 March 2022	19 May 2031	Madras High Court
10	Gunnu Anupama Chakravarthy	Judicial Service	24 March 2022	20 March 2032	Patna High Court

== List of Chief Justices ==
S.No.	Chief Justice	Tenure
Hyderabad State High Court
1	Muhammad Muslehuddin.	
2	Nizamat Jung	1916–1918

S.No.	Chief Justice	Tenure
Hyderabad State High Court
	R. S. Naik	

No.	Judge	Term start	Term end
Andhra High Court, Guntur
1	Koka Subba Rao	5 July 1954	31 October 1956
United Andhra Pradesh High Court
1	Koka Subba Rao	1 November 1956	30 January 1958
2	P. Chandra Reddy	16 June 1958	22 November 1964
3	P. Satyanarayana Raju	30 December 1964	19 October 1965
4	Manohar Pershad	20 October 1965	7 July 1966
5	N. D. Krishna Rao	8 July 1966	18 July 1966
6	P. Jagan Mohan Reddy	19 July 1966	31 July 1969
7	N. Kumarayya	1 August 1969	14 June 1971
8	K.V.L. Narasimham	15 June 1971	31 March 1972
9	Gopal Rao Ekbote	1 April 1972	31 May 1974
10	S. Obul Reddi	1 June 1974	6 July 1976
11	B. J. Divan	7 July 1976	27 August 1977
(10)	S. Obul Reddi	28 August 1977	8 April 1978
12	Avula Sambasiva Rao	9 April 1978	15 March 1979
13	Challa Kondaiah	16 March 1979	3 July 1980
14	Alladi Kuppu Swami	23 November 1980	22 March 1982
15	Konda Madhava Reddy	14 April 1983	7 April 1984
16	Koka Ramachandra Rao	1984	4 July 1984
17	P. Chennakesav Reddi	1985	29 September 1985
18	K. Bhaskaran	9 October 1985	18 March 1988
19	Yogeshwar Dayal	19 March 1988	21 March 1991
20	S.C. Pratap	1991	1992
21	S.B. Majumdar	12 October 1992	1 July 1993
22	Sundaram Nainar Sundaram	14 December 1993	1994
23	Saiyed Sagir Ahmed	23 September 1994	4 March 1995
24	Prabha Shankar Mishra	15 May 1995	27 October 1997
25	Umesh Chandra Banerjee	1 February 1998	9 December 1998
26	Manmohan Singh Liberhan	28 December 1998	10 November 2000
27	S. B. Sinha	11 December 2000	25 November 2001
28	Arunachalam R. Lakshmanan	26 November 2001	19 December 2002
29	Devinder Gupta	6 March 2003	3 April 2005
30	G.S. Singhvi	27 November 2005	11 November 2007
31	Anil Ramesh Dave	7 January 2008	11 February 2010
32	Nisar Ahmad Kakru	19 February 2010	25 October 2011
33	Madan Lokur	15 November 2011	4 June 2012
34	Pinaki Chandra Ghose	12 December 2012	8 March 2013
35	Kalyan Jyoti Sengupta	21 May 2013	5 May 2015
High Court of Judicature at Hyderabad
36	T.B. Radhakrishnan	7 July 2017	31 December 2018 (Note: During his tenure separate Telangana High Court was established and he became the First Chief Justice of new Telangana High Court)
Telangana High Court
1	T.B. Radhakrishnan	1 January 2019	2 April 2019
2	Raghvendra Singh Chauhan	22 June 2019	6 January 2021
3	Hima Kohli	7 January 2021	30 August 2021
4	Satish Chandra Sharma	11 October 2021	27 June 2022
5	Ujjal Bhuyan	28 June 2022	13 July 2023
6	Alok Aradhe	23 July 2023	20 January 2025
7	Aparesh Kumar Singh	19 July 2025	Incumbent

== Judges elevated as Chief Justices ==
This sections contains list of only those judges elevated as chief justices whose parent high court is Telangana. This includes those judges who, at the time of appointment as chief justice, may not be serving in Telangana High Court but this list does not include judges who at the time of appointment as chief justice were serving in Telangana High Court but does not have Telangana as their Parent High Court.

Colour Key

- Female Chief Justice
- Served as Chief Justice of India

Symbol Key

- ^{‡} Elevated to Supreme Court of India
- ^{RES} Resigned
- ^{†} Died in office

Name	Image	Appointed as CJ in HC of	Date of appointment		Date of retirement (Note: this includes date of resignation, death and elevation to supreme court)	Tenure		Ref..
Name	Image	Appointed as CJ in HC of	As Judge	As Chief Justice	Date of retirement	As Chief Justice	As Judge (Note: also includes tenure as Chief Justice)	Ref..
Puligoru Venkata Sanjay Kumar		Manipur	8 August 2008	14 February 2021	5 February 2023^{[‡]}	1 year, 357 days	14 years, 181 days	
Mamidanna Satyratna Ramachandra Rao		Himachal Pradesh, transferred to Jharkhand then to Tripura	29 June 2012	30 May 2023	Incumbent	3 years, 158 days	14 years, 127 days	

=== Judges appointed as Acting Chief Justice ===
Name	Appointed as ACJ in HC of	Date of appointment as Judge	Period as Acting Chief Justice	Date of retirement	Tenure as ACJ	Tenure as Judge	Remarks	Ref..
M. S. R. Rao	Telangana	29 June 2012	31 Aug 2021 – 10 Oct 2021	Incumbent	41 days	14 years, 127 days	Transferred to Punjab & Haryana	
Ponugoti Naveen Rao	Telangana	12 April 2013	14 Jul 2023	14 July 2023	1 day	10 years, 93 days	Retired as ACJ	
Abhinand Kumar Shavili	Telangana	21 September 2017	15 Jul 2023 – 23 Jul 2023	7 October 2025	9 days	8 years, 16 days	--	
T. A. Goud	Tripura	21 September 2017	11 Nov 2022 – 14 Feb 2023	Incumbent	96 days	9 years, 43 days	--	
T. A. Goud	Tripura	21 September 2017	23 Feb 2023 – 16 Apr 2023	Incumbent	53 days	9 years, 43 days	--	
T. A. Goud	Tripura	21 September 2017	18 Jul 2025 – 21 Jul 2025	Incumbent	4 days	9 years, 43 days	--	

== Judges elevated to Supreme Court ==
This section includes the list of only those judges whose parent high court was Telangana. This includes those judges who, at the time of elevation to Supreme Court of India, may not be serving in Telangana High Court but this list does not include judges who at the time of elevation were serving in Telangana High Court but does not have Telangana as their Parent High Court.

Colour Key

- Female Judge
- Served as Chief Justice of India

Symbol Key

- ^{RES} Resigned
- ^{†} Died in office

#	Name of the Judge	Image	Date of Appointment		Date of Retirement	Tenure			Immediately preceding office
#	Name of the Judge	Image	In Parent High Court	In Supreme Court	Date of Retirement	In High Court(s)	In Supreme Court	Total tenure (Note: Includes both tenure as High Court Judge as well as Supreme Court Judge)	Immediately preceding office
1	Puligoru Venkata Sanjay Kumar		8 August 2008	6 February 2023	Incumbent	14 years, 181 days	3 years, 271 days	18 years, 87 days	6th CJ of Manipur HC

== Judges of erstwhile Andhra Pradesh High Court ==
=== Elevated as Chief Justices ===
This sections contains list of only those judges elevated as chief justices whose parent high court is Andhra Pradesh. This includes those judges who, at the time of appointment as chief justice, may not be serving in Andhra Pradesh High Court but this list does not include judges who at the time of appointment as chief justice were serving in Andhra Pradesh High Court but does not have Andhra Pradesh as their Parent High Court.

Colour Key

- Female Chief Justice
- Served as Chief Justice of India

Symbol Key

- ^{‡} Elevated to Supreme Court of India
- ^{RES} Resigned
- ^{†} Died in office

Name	Image	Appointed as CJ in HC of	Date of appointment		Date of retirement (Note: this includes date of resignation, death and elevation to supreme court)	Tenure		Ref..
Name	Image	Appointed as CJ in HC of	As Judge	As Chief Justice	Date of retirement	As Chief Justice	As Judge (Note: also includes tenure as Chief Justice)	Ref..
Penmetsa Satyanarayana Raju		Andhra Pradesh	1 November 1954	30 December 1964	19 October 1965^{[‡]}	294 days	10 years, 353 days	
Nandalike Devarao Krishna Rao		Andhra Pradesh	21 February 1955	8 July 1966	18 July 1966	11 days	11 years, 148 days	
Manohar Pershad		Andhra Pradesh	20 November 1946	20 October 1965	7 July 1966	261 days	19 years, 230 days	
Mohammed Ahmed Ansari		Kerala	29 November 1946	29 March 1960	25 November 1961	1 year, 242 days	14 years, 362 days	
Pingle Jaganmohan Reddy		Andhra Pradesh	16 February 1952	19 July 1966	31 July 1969^{[‡]}	3 years, 13 days	17 years, 166 days	
Namapalli Kumarayya		Andhra Pradesh	18 August 1955	1 August 1969	14 June 1971	1 year, 318 days	15 years, 301 days	
Canakapalli Sanjeevrow Nayudu		Gauhati	13 March 1958	7 February 1967	7 March 1968	1 year, 30 days	9 years, 361 days	
K. V. L. Narasimham		Andhra Pradesh	9 December 1959	15 June 1971	31 March 1972	291 days	12 years, 114 days	
Gopal Rao Ekbote		Andhra Pradesh	7 June 1962	1 April 1972	31 May 1974	2 years, 61 days	11 years, 359 days	
Seshareddi Obul Reddy		Andhra Pradesh, transferred to Gujarat then back to Andhra Pradesh	8 July 1966	1 June 1974	8 April 1978	3 years, 312 days	11 years, 275 days	
Avula Sambasiva Rao		Andhra Pradesh	22 April 1967	9 April 1978	15 March 1979	341 days	11 years, 328 days	
Challa Kondaiah		Andhra Pradesh	21 August 1967	16 March 1979	3 July 1980	1 year, 110 days	12 years, 318 days	
Alladi Kuppu Swami		Andhra Pradesh	21 August 1967	23 November 1980	22 March 1982	1 year, 120 days	14 years, 214 days	
Konda Madhava Reddy		Andhra Pradesh, transferred to Bombay	28 May 1968	14 April 1983	21 October 1985	2 years, 191 days	17 years, 147 days	
Koka Ramachandra Rao		Andhra Pradesh	21 August 1968	1984	4 July 1984		15 years, 319 days	
Palem Chennakesava Reddy		Andhra Pradesh, transferred to Gauhati	10 May 1972	1985	2 November 1986		14 years, 177 days	
Anisetti Raghuvir		Andhra Pradesh, transferred to Gauhati	17 October 1974	6 May 1988	21 March 1991	2 years, 320 days	16 years, 156 days	
Benjaram Pranaya Jeevan Reddy		Allahabad	17 July 1975	16 April 1990	6 October 1991^{[‡]}	1 year, 174 days	16 years, 82 days	
Mamidanna Jagannadha Rao		Kerala, transferred to Delhi	29 November 1982	8 August 1991	20 March 1997^{[‡]}	5 years, 225 days	14 years, 112 days	
Ambati Lakshman Rao		Allahabad	10 December 1982	10 April 1995	14 January 1996	280 days	13 years, 36 days	
Makani Narayana Rao		Himachal Pradesh	11 July 1986	6 November 1997	21 April 1998	167 days	11 years, 285 days	
Yarabati Bhaskar Rao		Karnataka	11 July 1986	9 March 1999	26 June 2000	1 year, 110 days	13 years, 352 days	
Ponaka Venkatarama Reddi		Karnataka	16 March 1990	21 October 2000	16 August 2001^{[‡]}	300 days	11 years, 154 days	
Bollampally Subhashan Reddy		Madras, transferred to Kerala	25 November 1991	12 September 2001	2 March 2005	3 years, 172 days	13 years, 98 days	
Buchireddy Sudarshan Reddy		Gauhati	2 May 1995	5 December 2005	11 January 2007^{[‡]}	1 year, 38 days	11 years, 255 days	
Jasti Chelameswar		Gauhati, transferred to Kerala	23 June 1997	3 May 2007	9 October 2011^{[‡]}	4 years, 160 days	14 years, 109 days	
Toom Meena Kumari		Meghalaya	23 February 1998	23 March 2013	3 August 2013	134 days	15 years, 162 days	
Nuthalapati Venkata Ramana		Delhi	27 June 2000	2 September 2013	16 February 2014^{[‡]}	168 days	13 years, 235 days	
Gorla Rohini		Delhi	25 June 2001	21 April 2014	13 April 2017	2 years, 358 days	15 years, 293 days	
Lingala Narasimha Reddy		Patna	10 September 2001	2 January 2015	31 July 2015	211 days	13 years, 325 days	
Ramayyagari Subhash Reddy		Gujarat	2 December 2002	13 February 2016	1 November 2018^{[‡]}	2 years, 262 days	15 years, 335 days	

=== Elevated to Supreme Court ===
This section includes the list of only those judges whose parent high court was Andhra Pradesh. This includes those judges who, at the time of elevation to Supreme Court of India, may not be serving in Andhra Pradesh High Court but this list does not include judges who at the time of elevation were serving in Andhra Pradesh High Court but does not have Andhra Pradesh as their Parent High Court.

Colour Key

- Female Judge
- Served as Chief Justice of India

Key

- ^{RES} Resigned
- ^{†} Died in office

#	Name of the Judge	Image	Date of Appointment		Date of Retirement	Tenure			Immediately preceding office
#	Name of the Judge	Image	In Parent High Court	In Supreme Court	Date of Retirement	In High Court(s)	In Supreme Court	Total tenure (Note: Includes both tenure as High Court Judge as well as Supreme Court Judge)	Immediately preceding office
1	Penmetsa Satyanarayana Raju		1 January 1954	20 October 1965	20 April 1966^{[†]}	11 years, 292 days	183 days	12 years, 110 days	CJ in same High Court
2	Pingle Jaganmohan Reddy		16 February 1952	1 August 1969	22 January 1975	17 years, 166 days	5 years, 175 days	22 years, 341 days	CJ in same High Court
3	Ontethupalli Chinnappa Reddy		21 August 1967	17 July 1978	24 September 1987	10 years, 330 days	9 years, 70 days	20 years, 35 days	Judge of Andhra Pradesh HC
4	Katikithala Ramaswamy		29 September 1982	6 October 1989	12 July 1997	7 years, 7 days	7 years, 280 days	14 years, 287 days	Judge of Andhra Pradesh HC
5	Kamireddy Jayachandra Reddy		7 March 1975	11 January 1990	14 July 1994	14 years, 310 days	4 years, 185 days	19 years, 130 days	Judge of Andhra Pradesh HC
6	Benjaram Pranaya Jeevan Reddy		17 July 1975	7 October 1991	13 March 1997	16 years, 82 days	5 years, 158 days	21 years, 240 days	31st CJ of Allahabad HC
7	Mamidanna Jagannadha Rao		29 September 1982	21 March 1997	1 December 2000	14 years, 173 days	3 years, 256 days	18 years, 64 days	17th CJ of Delhi HC
8	Syed Shah Mohammed Quadri		11 July 1986	4 December 1997	5 April 2003	11 years, 146 days	5 years, 123 days	16 years, 269 days	Acting CJ of Andhra Pradesh HC
9	Ponaka Venkatarama Reddi		16 March 1990	17 August 2001	9 August 2005	11 years, 154 days	3 years, 358 days	15 years, 147 days	20th CJ of Karnataka HC
10	Buchireddy Sudershan Reddy		2 May 1995	12 January 2007	7 July 2011	11 years, 255 days	4 years, 177 days	16 years, 67 days	30th CJ of Gauhati HC
11	Jasti Chelameswar		23 June 1997	10 October 2011	22 June 2018	14 years, 109 days	6 years, 256 days	21 years, 0 days	29th CJ of Kerala HC
12	Nuthalapati Venkata Ramana		27 June 2000	17 February 2014	26 August 2022	13 years, 235 days	8 years, 191 days	22 years, 61 days	28th CJ of Delhi HC
13	Ramayyagari Subhash Reddy		2 December 2002	2 November 2018	4 January 2022	15 years, 335 days	3 years, 64 days	19 years, 34 days	24th CJ of Gujarat HC

== Present Registrars of High Court ==
1. Registrar General & FAC. Registrar (Vigilance) – Sri S. Goverdhan Reddy

2. Registrar (Infrastrcuture) & FAC. Registrar (Judicial I ) – Sri G. Raja Gopal

3. Registrar (Administration) & FAC. Registrar (Recruitment) – Sri Sura Srinivas Reddy

4. Registrar (I.T.)-cum-Central Project Coordinator (IT & E-Committee related) & FAC. Registrar (Enquiries) – Sri D. Kiran Kumar

5. Registrar (Protocol)-T Venkateswara Rao

6. Registrar (Judicial II)- Sri B.S. Chiranjeevi

7. Registrar (OSD)- Sri P. Sreedhar Rao

8. Registrar (OSD)- Sri V. Ramesh

== Present unit heads ==
1. Adilabad – M. R. Sunitha
2. Karimnagar – B. Prathima
3. Khammam – P Chandrashekara Prasad
4. Mahabubnagar -S Premavathi
5. Medak – B Papi Reddy
6. Nalgonda – S Jagjeevan Kumar
7. Nizamabad -Kunchala Suneetha
8. Rangareddy – R Tirupathi
9. Warangal – Narsing Rao Nandikonda
10. Hyderabad-City Civil Court – Sasidhar Reddy
11. Hyderabad-City Small Causes Court -V B Nirmala Geethamba
12. Hyderabad-Metropolitan Sessions Court – E Tirumala Devi
13. Hyderabad – Principal CBI – Ch. Ramesh Babu

== See also ==
- High Courts of India
- Establishments in Hyderabad State
