= Andhra Pradesh High Court =

High court in the Indian state of Andhra Pradesh

High Court of Andhra Pradesh
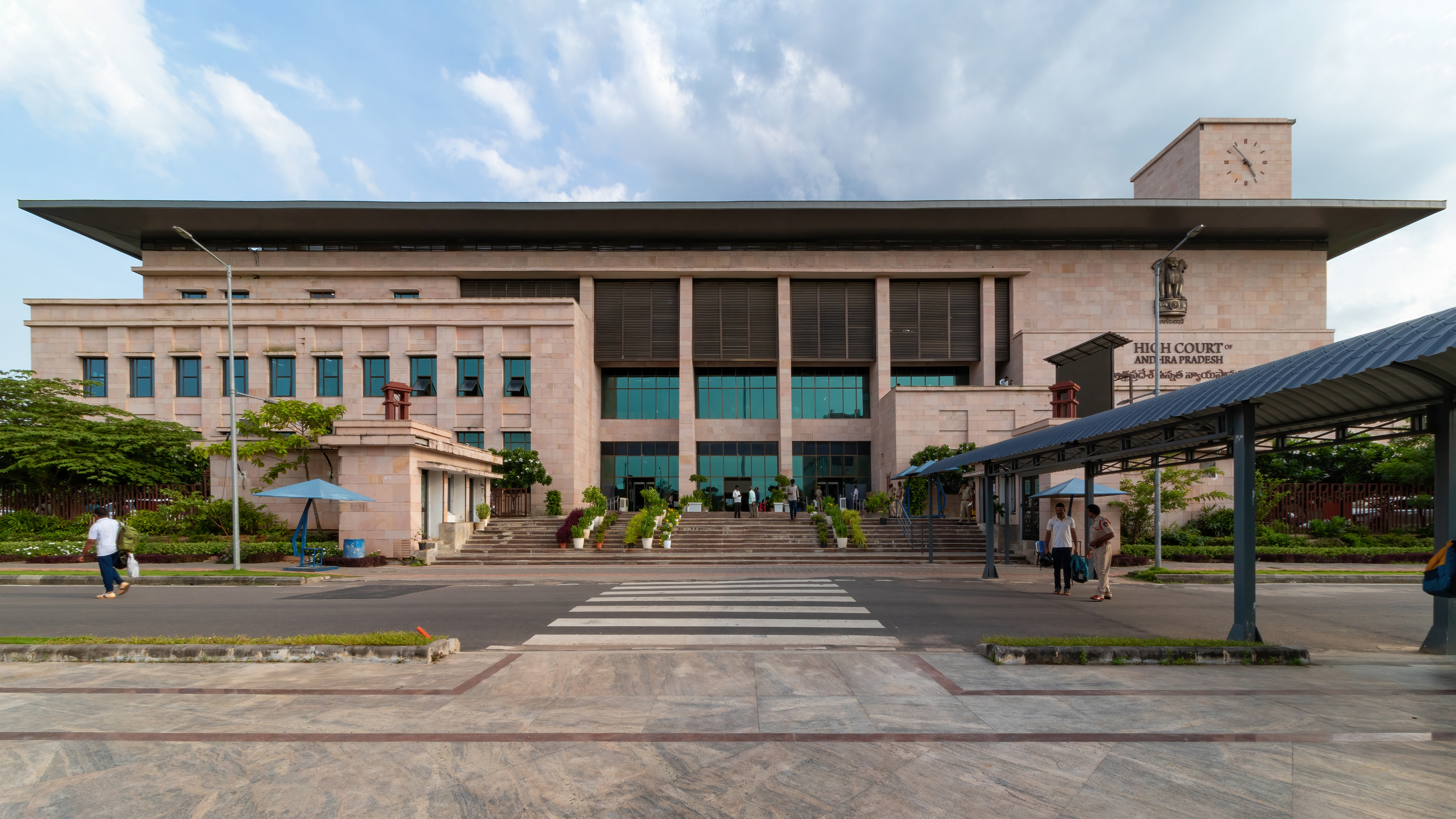
- High Court of Andhra Pradesh building
- Interactive map of High Court of Andhra Pradesh
- 16.5195°N 80.4856°E
- Established: 1 January 2019; 7 years ago
- Jurisdiction: Andhra Pradesh
- Location: Nelapadu, Andhra Pradesh
- Coordinates: 16.5195°N 80.4856°E
- Composition method: Presidential with confirmation of Chief Justice of India and Governor of Andhra Pradesh
- Authorised by: Constitution of India
- Judge term length: till the age of 62 years
- Number of positions: 37
- Website: aphc.gov.in

Chief Justice
- Currently: Lisa Gill
- Since: 25 April 2026

The High Court of Andhra Pradesh is the High Court of the Indian state of Andhra Pradesh. It serves the judicial duties of Andhra Pradesh.

== History ==
The High Court of Andhra Pradesh was established in 1954 when the state was formed from the earlier Madras Presidency. After the merger of the Hyderabad State with Andhra State to form the State of Andhra Pradesh, the Court initially continued at Guntur till 1956. Thereafter the High Court started functioning from the then capital city of the state, Hyderabad. However, post bifurcation of Andhra Pradesh, as per the Andhra Pradesh Reorganisation Act, 2014, the High Court of Judicature at Hyderabad was constituted as a common High Court, until the new High Court for the State of Andhra Pradesh was created, by a Presidential order on 1 January 2019 under the Andhra Pradesh Reorganisation Act, 2014.

== Geography and structure ==
The High Court is located at Amaravati. It is a G+2 structure which has 23 halls that spread over an area of 220,000 square feet (20,000 m^{2}). It was built in 4 acres with a cost of 157.3 crore. This building was constructed by Larsen & Toubro Limited.

== Chief Justice & Judges ==
The Andhra Pradesh High Court sits at Amravati, the capital of the state of Andhra Pradesh, and can have maximum of 37 judges, of which 28 must be permanently appointed and 9 may be additionally appointed. The court currently has 29 judges.

=== Judges transferred from the Andhra Pradesh High Court ===
Sr. No.	Name of the Judge	Recruitment	Date of Appointment	Date of Retirement	Remark
1	Lalitha Kanneganti	BAR	2 May 2020	4 May 2033	Judge of Telangana High Court

=== List of chief justices ===
No.	Portrait	Judge	Term start	Term end
Andhra High Court, Guntur
1		Koka Subba Rao	5 July 1954	31 October 1956
United Andhra Pradesh High Court
1		Koka Subba Rao	1 November 1956	30 January 1958
2		P. Chandra Reddy	16 June 1958	22 November 1964
3		P. Satyanarayana Raju	30 December 1964	19 October 1965
4		Manohar Pershad	20 October 1965	7 July 1966
5		Nandalike Devarao Krishna Rao	8 July 1966	18 July 1966
6		P. Jagan Mohan Reddy	19 July 1966	31 July 1969
7		N. Kumarayya	1 August 1969	14 June 1971
8		K.V.L. Narasimham	15 June 1971	31 March 1972
9		Gopal Rao Ekbote	1 April 1972	31 May 1974
10		S. Obul Reddi	1 June 1974	6 July 1976
11		B. J. Divan	7 July 1976	27 August 1977
(10)		S. Obul Reddi	28 August 1977	8 April 1978
12		Avula Sambasiva Rao	9 April 1978	15 March 1979
13		Challa Kondaiah	16 March 1979	3 July 1980
14		Alladi Kuppu Swami	23 November 1980	22 March 1982
15		Konda Madhava Reddy	14 April 1983	7 April 1984
16		Koka Ramachandra Rao	1984	4 July 1984
17		P. Chennakesav Reddi	1985	29 September 1985
18		K. Bhaskaran	9 October 1985	18 March 1988
19		Yogeshwar Dayal	19 March 1988	21 March 1991
20		S.C. Pratap	1991	1992
21		S.B. Majumdar	12 October 1992	1 July 1993
22		Sundaram Nainar Sundaram	14 December 1993	1994
23		Saiyed Sagir Ahmed	23 September 1994	4 March 1995
24		Prabha Shankar Mishra	15 May 1995	27 October 1997
25		Umesh Chandra Banerjee	1 February 1998	9 December 1998
26		Manmohan Singh Liberhan	28 December 1998	10 November 2000
27		S. B. Sinha	11 December 2000	25 November 2001
28		Arunachalam R. Lakshmanan	26 November 2001	19 December 2002
29		Devinder Gupta	6 March 2003	3 April 2005
30		G.S. Singhvi	27 November 2005	11 November 2007
31		Anil Ramesh Dave	7 January 2008	11 February 2010
32		Nisar Ahmad Kakru	19 February 2010	25 October 2011
33		Madan Lokur	15 November 2011	4 June 2012
34		Pinaki Chandra Ghose	12 December 2012	8 March 2013
35		Kalyan Jyoti Sengupta	21 May 2013	5 May 2015 (Note: During his term High Court of Andhra Pradesh was renamed as Hyderabad High Court)
High Court of Judicature at Hyderabad
36		T.B. Radhakrishnan	7 July 2017	31 December 2018
Andhra Pradesh High Court
1		J. K. Maheshwari	7 October 2019	5 January 2021
2		Arup Kumar Goswami	6 January 2021	12 October 2021
3		Prashant Kumar Mishra	13 October 2021	18 May 2023
4		Dhiraj Singh Thakur	28 July 2023	24 April 2026
5		Lisa Gill	25 April 2026	Incumbent

== Judges elevated as Chief Justices ==
This sections contains list of only those judges elevated as chief justices whose parent high court is Andhra Pradesh. This includes those judges who, at the time of appointment as chief justice, may not be serving in Andhra Pradesh High Court but this list does not include judges who at the time of appointment as chief justice were serving in Andhra Pradesh High Court but does not have Andhra Pradesh as their Parent High Court.

Colour Key

- Female Chief Justice
- Served as Chief Justice of India

Symbol Key

- ^{‡} Elevated to Supreme Court of India
- ^{RES} Resigned
- ^{†} Died in office

Name	Image	Appointed as CJ in HC of	Date of appointment		Date of retirement (Note: this includes date of resignation, death and elevation to supreme court)	Tenure	
Name	Image	Appointed as CJ in HC of	As Judge	As Chief Justice	Date of retirement	As Chief Justice	As Judge (Note: also includes tenure as Chief Justice)
Ramesh Ranganathan		Uttarakhand	26 May 2005	2 November 2018	27 July 2020	1 year, 269 days	15 years, 63 days
Sarasa Venkatanarayana Bhatti		Kerala	12 April 2013	1 June 2023	14 July 2023^{[‡]}	44 days	10 years, 92 days

=== Judges appointed as Acting Chief Justice ===
Name	Appointed as ACJ in HC of	Date of appointment as Judge	Period as Acting Chief Justice	Date of retirement	Tenure as ACJ	Tenure as Judge	Remarks	Ref..
Ramesh Ranganathan	Andhra Pradesh	26 May 2005	30 Jul 2016 – 6 Jul 2017	27 July 2020	342 days	15 years, 63 days	--	
C. Praveen Kumar	Andhra Pradesh	29 June 2012	1 Jan 2019 – 6 Oct 2019	25 February 2023	280 days	10 years, 242 days	--	
S. V. N. Bhatti	Kerala	12 April 2013	24 Apr 2023 – 31 May 2023	14 July 2023^{[‡]}	38 days	10 years, 92 days	Became permanent	
Akula Venkata Sesha Sai	Andhra Pradesh	12 April 2013	19 May 2023 – 27 Jul 2023	2 June 2024	70 days	11 years, 51 days	--	

== Judges elevated to Supreme Court ==
This section includes the list of only those judges whose parent high court was Andhra Pradesh. This includes those judges who, at the time of elevation to Supreme Court of India, may not be serving in Andhra Pradesh High Court but this list does not include judges who at the time of elevation were serving in Andhra Pradesh High Court but does not have Andhra Pradesh as their Parent High Court.

Colour Key

- Female Judge
- Served as Chief Justice of India

Key

- ^{RES} Resigned
- ^{†} Died in office

#	Name of the Judge	Image	Date of Appointment		Date of Retirement	Tenure			Immediately preceding office
#	Name of the Judge	Image	In Parent High Court	In Supreme Court	Date of Retirement	In High Court(s)	In Supreme Court	Total tenure (Note: Includes both tenure as High Court Judge as well as Supreme Court Judge)	Immediately preceding office
1	Sarasa Venkatanarayana Bhatti		12 April 2013	14 July 2023	Incumbent	10 years, 92 days	3 years, 117 days	13 years, 209 days	37th CJ of Kerala HC

== Judges of erstwhile Andhra Pradesh High Court ==
=== Elevated as Chief Justices ===
This sections contains list of only those judges elevated as chief justices whose parent high court is Andhra Pradesh. This includes those judges who, at the time of appointment as chief justice, may not be serving in Andhra Pradesh High Court but this list does not include judges who at the time of appointment as chief justice were serving in Andhra Pradesh High Court but does not have Andhra Pradesh as their Parent High Court.

Colour Key

- Female Chief Justice
- Served as Chief Justice of India

Symbol Key

- ^{‡} Elevated to Supreme Court of India
- ^{RES} Resigned
- ^{†} Died in office

Name	Image	Appointed as CJ in HC of	Date of appointment		Date of retirement (Note: this includes date of resignation, death and elevation to supreme court)	Tenure		Ref..
Name	Image	Appointed as CJ in HC of	As Judge	As Chief Justice	Date of retirement	As Chief Justice	As Judge (Note: also includes tenure as Chief Justice)	Ref..
Penmetsa Satyanarayana Raju		Andhra Pradesh	1 November 1954	30 December 1964	19 October 1965^{[‡]}	294 days	10 years, 353 days	
Nandalike Devarao Krishna Rao		Andhra Pradesh	21 February 1955	8 July 1966	18 July 1966	11 days	11 years, 148 days	
Manohar Pershad		Andhra Pradesh	20 November 1946	20 October 1965	7 July 1966	261 days	19 years, 230 days	
Mohammed Ahmed Ansari		Kerala	29 November 1946	29 March 1960	25 November 1961	1 year, 242 days	14 years, 362 days	
Pingle Jaganmohan Reddy		Andhra Pradesh	16 February 1952	19 July 1966	31 July 1969^{[‡]}	3 years, 13 days	17 years, 166 days	
Namapalli Kumarayya		Andhra Pradesh	18 August 1955	1 August 1969	14 June 1971	1 year, 318 days	15 years, 301 days	
Canakapalli Sanjeevrow Nayudu		Gauhati	13 March 1958	7 February 1967	7 March 1968	1 year, 30 days	9 years, 361 days	
K. V. L. Narasimham		Andhra Pradesh	9 December 1959	15 June 1971	31 March 1972	291 days	12 years, 114 days	
Gopal Rao Ekbote		Andhra Pradesh	7 June 1962	1 April 1972	31 May 1974	2 years, 61 days	11 years, 359 days	
Seshareddi Obul Reddy		Andhra Pradesh, transferred to Gujarat then back to Andhra Pradesh	8 July 1966	1 June 1974	8 April 1978	3 years, 312 days	11 years, 275 days	
Avula Sambasiva Rao		Andhra Pradesh	22 April 1967	9 April 1978	15 March 1979	341 days	11 years, 328 days	
Challa Kondaiah		Andhra Pradesh	21 August 1967	16 March 1979	3 July 1980	1 year, 110 days	12 years, 318 days	
Alladi Kuppu Swami		Andhra Pradesh	21 August 1967	23 November 1980	22 March 1982	1 year, 120 days	14 years, 214 days	
Konda Madhava Reddy		Andhra Pradesh, transferred to Bombay	28 May 1968	14 April 1983	21 October 1985	2 years, 191 days	17 years, 147 days	
Koka Ramachandra Rao		Andhra Pradesh	21 August 1968	1984	4 July 1984		15 years, 319 days	
Palem Chennakesava Reddy		Andhra Pradesh, transferred to Gauhati	10 May 1972	1985	2 November 1986		14 years, 177 days	
Anisetti Raghuvir		Andhra Pradesh, transferred to Gauhati	17 October 1974	6 May 1988	21 March 1991	2 years, 320 days	16 years, 156 days	
Benjaram Pranaya Jeevan Reddy		Allahabad	17 July 1975	16 April 1990	6 October 1991^{[‡]}	1 year, 174 days	16 years, 82 days	
Mamidanna Jagannadha Rao		Kerala, transferred to Delhi	29 November 1982	8 August 1991	20 March 1997^{[‡]}	5 years, 225 days	14 years, 112 days	
Ambati Lakshman Rao		Allahabad	10 December 1982	10 April 1995	14 January 1996	280 days	13 years, 36 days	
Makani Narayana Rao		Himachal Pradesh	11 July 1986	6 November 1997	21 April 1998	167 days	11 years, 285 days	
Yarabati Bhaskar Rao		Karnataka	11 July 1986	9 March 1999	26 June 2000	1 year, 110 days	13 years, 352 days	
Ponaka Venkatarama Reddi		Karnataka	16 March 1990	21 October 2000	16 August 2001^{[‡]}	300 days	11 years, 154 days	
Bollampally Subhashan Reddy		Madras, transferred to Kerala	25 November 1991	12 September 2001	2 March 2005	3 years, 172 days	13 years, 98 days	
Buchireddy Sudarshan Reddy		Gauhati	2 May 1995	5 December 2005	11 January 2007^{[‡]}	1 year, 38 days	11 years, 255 days	
Jasti Chelameswar		Gauhati, transferred to Kerala	23 June 1997	3 May 2007	9 October 2011^{[‡]}	4 years, 160 days	14 years, 109 days	
Toom Meena Kumari		Meghalaya	23 February 1998	23 March 2013	3 August 2013	134 days	15 years, 162 days	
Nuthalapati Venkata Ramana		Delhi	27 June 2000	2 September 2013	16 February 2014^{[‡]}	168 days	13 years, 235 days	
Gorla Rohini		Delhi	25 June 2001	21 April 2014	13 April 2017	2 years, 358 days	15 years, 293 days	
Lingala Narasimha Reddy		Patna	10 September 2001	2 January 2015	31 July 2015	211 days	13 years, 325 days	
Ramayyagari Subhash Reddy		Gujarat	2 December 2002	13 February 2016	1 November 2018^{[‡]}	2 years, 262 days	15 years, 335 days	

=== Elevated to Supreme Court ===
This section includes the list of only those judges whose parent high court was Andhra Pradesh. This includes those judges who, at the time of elevation to Supreme Court of India, may not be serving in Andhra Pradesh High Court but this list does not include judges who at the time of elevation were serving in Andhra Pradesh High Court but does not have Andhra Pradesh as their Parent High Court.

Colour Key

- Female Judge
- Served as Chief Justice of India

Key

- ^{RES} Resigned
- ^{†} Died in office

#	Name of the Judge	Image	Date of Appointment		Date of Retirement	Tenure			Immediately preceding office
#	Name of the Judge	Image	In Parent High Court	In Supreme Court	Date of Retirement	In High Court(s)	In Supreme Court	Total tenure (Note: Includes both tenure as High Court Judge as well as Supreme Court Judge)	Immediately preceding office
1	Penmetsa Satyanarayana Raju		1 January 1954	20 October 1965	20 April 1966^{[†]}	11 years, 292 days	183 days	12 years, 110 days	CJ in same High Court
2	Pingle Jaganmohan Reddy		16 February 1952	1 August 1969	22 January 1975	17 years, 166 days	5 years, 175 days	22 years, 341 days	CJ in same High Court
3	Ontethupalli Chinnappa Reddy		21 August 1967	17 July 1978	24 September 1987	10 years, 330 days	9 years, 70 days	20 years, 35 days	Judge of Andhra Pradesh HC
4	Katikithala Ramaswamy		29 September 1982	6 October 1989	12 July 1997	7 years, 7 days	7 years, 280 days	14 years, 287 days	Judge of Andhra Pradesh HC
5	Kamireddy Jayachandra Reddy		7 March 1975	11 January 1990	14 July 1994	14 years, 310 days	4 years, 185 days	19 years, 130 days	Judge of Andhra Pradesh HC
6	Benjaram Pranaya Jeevan Reddy		17 July 1975	7 October 1991	13 March 1997	16 years, 82 days	5 years, 158 days	21 years, 240 days	31st CJ of Allahabad HC
7	Mamidanna Jagannadha Rao		29 September 1982	21 March 1997	1 December 2000	14 years, 173 days	3 years, 256 days	18 years, 64 days	17th CJ of Delhi HC
8	Syed Shah Mohammed Quadri		11 July 1986	4 December 1997	5 April 2003	11 years, 146 days	5 years, 123 days	16 years, 269 days	Acting CJ of Andhra Pradesh HC
9	Ponaka Venkatarama Reddi		16 March 1990	17 August 2001	9 August 2005	11 years, 154 days	3 years, 358 days	15 years, 147 days	20th CJ of Karnataka HC
10	Buchireddy Sudershan Reddy		2 May 1995	12 January 2007	7 July 2011	11 years, 255 days	4 years, 177 days	16 years, 67 days	30th CJ of Gauhati HC
11	Jasti Chelameswar		23 June 1997	10 October 2011	22 June 2018	14 years, 109 days	6 years, 256 days	21 years, 0 days	29th CJ of Kerala HC
12	Nuthalapati Venkata Ramana		27 June 2000	17 February 2014	26 August 2022	13 years, 235 days	8 years, 191 days	22 years, 61 days	28th CJ of Delhi HC
13	Ramayyagari Subhash Reddy		2 December 2002	2 November 2018	4 January 2022	15 years, 335 days	3 years, 64 days	19 years, 34 days	24th CJ of Gujarat HC
