= Alladi =

Alladi (Telugu: అల్లాడి) is a Telugu surname and given name. Notable people with the name include:

- Alladi Krishnaswamy Iyer (1883–1953), Indian lawyer and member of the Constituent Assembly of India
- Alladi Kuppu Swamy (1920–2012), Indian lawyer of Chief Justice of Andhra Pradesh High Court
- Alladi Ramakrishnan (1923–2008), Indian physicist and the founder of the Institute of Mathematical Sciences
- Krishnaswami Alladi (born 1955) Indian-American mathematician who specializes in number theory
- Sudhir Alladi Venkatesh (born 1966) – Sociologist and urban ethnographer
