= Penmetsa =

Penmetsa (Telugu: పెన్మత్స), Penumatsa, Penmatsa or Penmethsa is a Telugu Raju surname. Notable people with the surname include:

- Penmetsa Ram Gopal Varma, Indian film director and producer
- Penmetsa Satyanarayana Raju, Supreme Court Chief Justice of India
- Penmetsa Subbaraju, Indian actor
- Penmetsa Venkata Ramaraju, Indian music composer
- Penmetsa Surapa Raju, Ancestor to all Penmetsa's
