= S. B. Sinha =

Indian judge (1944–2019)

Satya Brata Sinha

5th Chairperson of Telecom Disputes Settlement and Appellate Tribunal
- In office 3 November 2009 – 2 November 2012
- Appointed by: Pratibha Patil
- Preceded by: Arun Kumar
- Succeeded by: Aftab Alam

Judge of Supreme Court of India
- In office 3 October 2002 – 8 August 2009
- Nominated by: Bhupinder Nath Kirpal
- Appointed by: A. P. J. Abdul Kalam

21st Chief Justice of Delhi High Court
- In office 26 November 2001 – 2 October 2002
- Nominated by: Sam Piroj Bharucha
- Appointed by: K. R. Narayanan
- Preceded by: Arijit Pasayat
- Succeeded by: Babulal Chandulal Patel

27th Chief Justice of Andhra Pradesh High Court
- In office 11 December 2000 – 25 November 2001
- Nominated by: Adarsh Sein Anand
- Appointed by: K. R. Narayanan
- Preceded by: M. S. Liberhan
- Succeeded by: A. R. Lakshmanan

Judge of Calcutta High Court
- In office 11 May 1994 – 10 December 2000
- Nominated by: M. N. Venkatachaliah
- Appointed by: Shankar Dayal Sharma

Judge of Patna High Court
- In office 9 March 1987 – 10 May 1994
- Nominated by: R. S. Pathak
- Appointed by: Zail Singh

Personal details
- Born: 8 August 1944 Dhanbad, Jharkhand, India
- Died: 19 March 2019 (aged 74) New Delhi, India
- Spouse: Utpala Sinha

Satya Brata Sinha (8 August 1944 – 19 March 2019), known as S. B. Sinha, was a jurist and former judge of the Supreme Court of India.

== Introduction ==
S. B. Sinha was born in Kayastha on 8 August 1944 at Dhanbad in the state of Jharkhand, India. He passed his matriculation examination from H.E. School, Dhanbad and received his Bachelor of Laws degree from Chotanagpur Law College in 1967. Sinha joined the Dhanbad District Court in 1968 after which he shifted his practice to Ranchi upon constitution of the Permanent Bench of the Patna High Court in 1976.

He was designated as senior advocate by the Patna High Court. Subsequently, he was appointed the first Government Advocate of the Ranchi Bench of the Patna High Court and was elevated to the Patna High Court on 9 March 1987. He was transferred to the Calcutta High Court on 11 May 1994. He served as the Chief Justice of the High Courts of Andhra Pradesh and Delhi.

He was elevated as a judge of the Supreme Court of India on 3 October 2002 and retired on 8 August 2009.

== TDSAT Chairman ==
On 3 November 2009, after retirement from the Supreme Court, Sinha was appointed the chairman of the Telecom Disputes Settlement and Appellate Tribunal (TDSAT) succeeding Arun Kumar who retired in September, 2009.

== Death ==
Sinha died on 19 March 2019 at the age of 74 after brief illness in New Delhi.
