= Gopal Rao =

Gopal Rao or Gopāla Rāo is an Indian name and may refer to:

- Gopalrao Bajirao Khedkar, Indian politician
- Gopal Rao Ekbote (1912–1994), Indian politician and past Chief Justice of Andhra Pradesh High Court
- Gopalrao Mayekar (1934–2021), Indian politician and writer
- Gopalrao Patil, Indian politician and pediatrician
- Rao Gopal Rao (1937–1994), Indian actor in Telugu cinema
- Dheerendra Gopal, born Gopal Rao, Indian actor

== See also ==
- Gopalrao Deshmukh Marg, road in Maharashtra, India
