= Narsingrao =

Narsingrao or Narsing Rao are names. People with the names include:

- Narsingrao Suryawanshi
- Narsingrao Sheshrao Deshmukh
- Rajesh Narsingrao Patil
- Baburao Narsingrao Kokate (Adaskar)
- Shashikant Narsingrao Khedekar
- B. Narsing Rao
- J. V. Narsing Rao
- Vaddepalli Narsing Rao
- Narsing Rao Nandikonda
