= S. Obul Reddy =

Indian High Court Chief Justice

Seshareddi Obul Reddy

10th Chief Justice of Andhra Pradesh High Court
- In office 19 August 1977 – 8 April 1978
- Appointed by: Neelam Sanjiva Reddy
- Preceded by: B. J. Divan
- Succeeded by: Avula Sambasiva Rao
- In office 1 June 1974 – 7 July 1976
- Appointed by: V. V. Giri
- Preceded by: Gopal Rao Ekbote
- Succeeded by: B. J. Divan

7th Chief Justice of Gujarat High Court
- In office 7 July 1976 – 18 August 1977
- Appointed by: Fakhruddin Ali Ahmed
- Preceded by: B. J. Divan; J. B. Mehta (acting)
- Succeeded by: B. J. Divan; J. B. Mehta (acting)

Judge of Andhra Pradesh High Court
- In office 8 July 1966 – 31 May 1974
- Appointed by: S. Radhakrishnan

Personal details
- Born: 9 April 1916 Andhra Pradesh
- Died: July 1996 (aged 80) Hyderabad
- Education: Presidency College, Chennai, Madras Law College

Seshareddi Obul Reddy (9 April 1916 – July 1996) was Chief Justice of High Courts of Andhra Pradesh and Gujarat and Governor of Andhra Pradesh in India.

== Early life ==
He studied at Board High School, Nandalur, Government Arts College, Anantapur, Presidency College, Madras and Law College, Madras.

== Career ==
He held various positions as an Advocate, District and Sessions Judge, Grade-II and Grade-I and Registrar, Additional Judge and Permanent Judge in High Court of Andhra Pradesh from 1943 to 1974.

He was appointed Chief Justice of Andhra Pradesh High Court on 1 June 1974 and acted as Governor of Andhra Pradesh from 26 January 1975 to 10 January 1976. He was transferred as chief justice of Gujarat High Court on 7 July 1976 and retransferred as Chief Justice of Andhra Pradesh High Court, on 19 August 1977 and worked until 8 April 1978.

According to Justice M. Jagannadha Rao, as stated in his speech, "Justice Obul Reddy was thus intelligent, sharp and quick, was orthodox and not an activist judge, was self-disciplined and was a strict disciplinarian whether it was within the judiciary or where the bar [was] involved. It is obvious that he was not bothered much about what the subordinate judiciary or the bar felt about his principles. He treated seniors and juniors alike. His judgments were never delayed. He had no backlog of judgements. He was God-fearing and believed in destiny."

Government offices
Preceded by Khandubhai Kasanji Desai	Governor of Andhra Pradesh; 1975 – 1976	Succeeded by Mohanlal Sukhadia
