= Umesh Chandra Banerjee =

Indian judge (1937–2012)

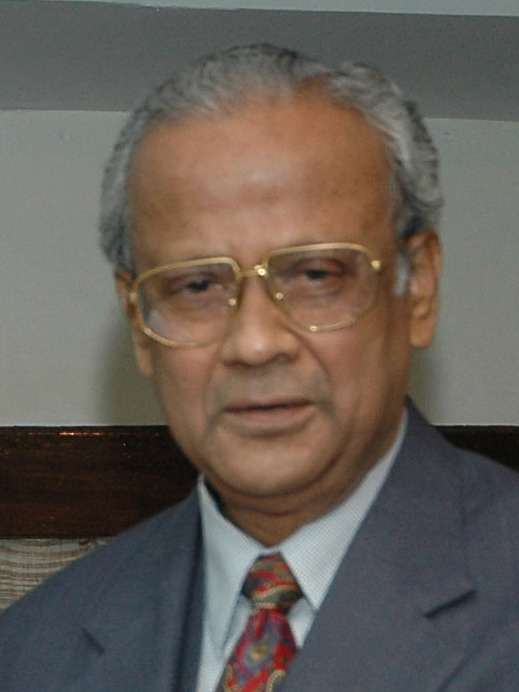
- Umesh Chandra Banerjee, 2006

Judge of the Supreme Court of India

Chief Justice of the High Court of Judicature at Hyderabad
- Preceded by: Prabha Shankar Mishra
- Succeeded by: Manmohan Singh Liberhan

Personal details
- Born: 18 November 1937
- Died: 5 November 2012 (aged 74)
- Education: University of Calcutta

Umesh Chandra Banerjee (18 November 1937 – 5 November 2012) was a Bengali Indian jurist, who served as the chief justice of the Hyderabad High Court in 1998. He had also served as a permanent judge of the Calcutta High Court and as a judge of the Supreme Court of India.

== Early life ==
Born to Nalin Chandra Banerjee, an eminent criminal and constitutional lawyer, he graduated from the Scottish Church College of the University of Calcutta in 1961, before proceeding to study law at the Inner Temple in London, from which he graduated in December, 1964.

== Career ==
He started out as a barrister at the Calcutta High Court in 1965. He was appointed a permanent judge at the Calcutta High Court in 1984. In February 1998, he was appointed Chief Justice of the Andhra Pradesh High Court. He was also appointed a judge of the Supreme Court of India in December 1998. He retired in 2002. He was one of the founder members and later president of SAARC Law.

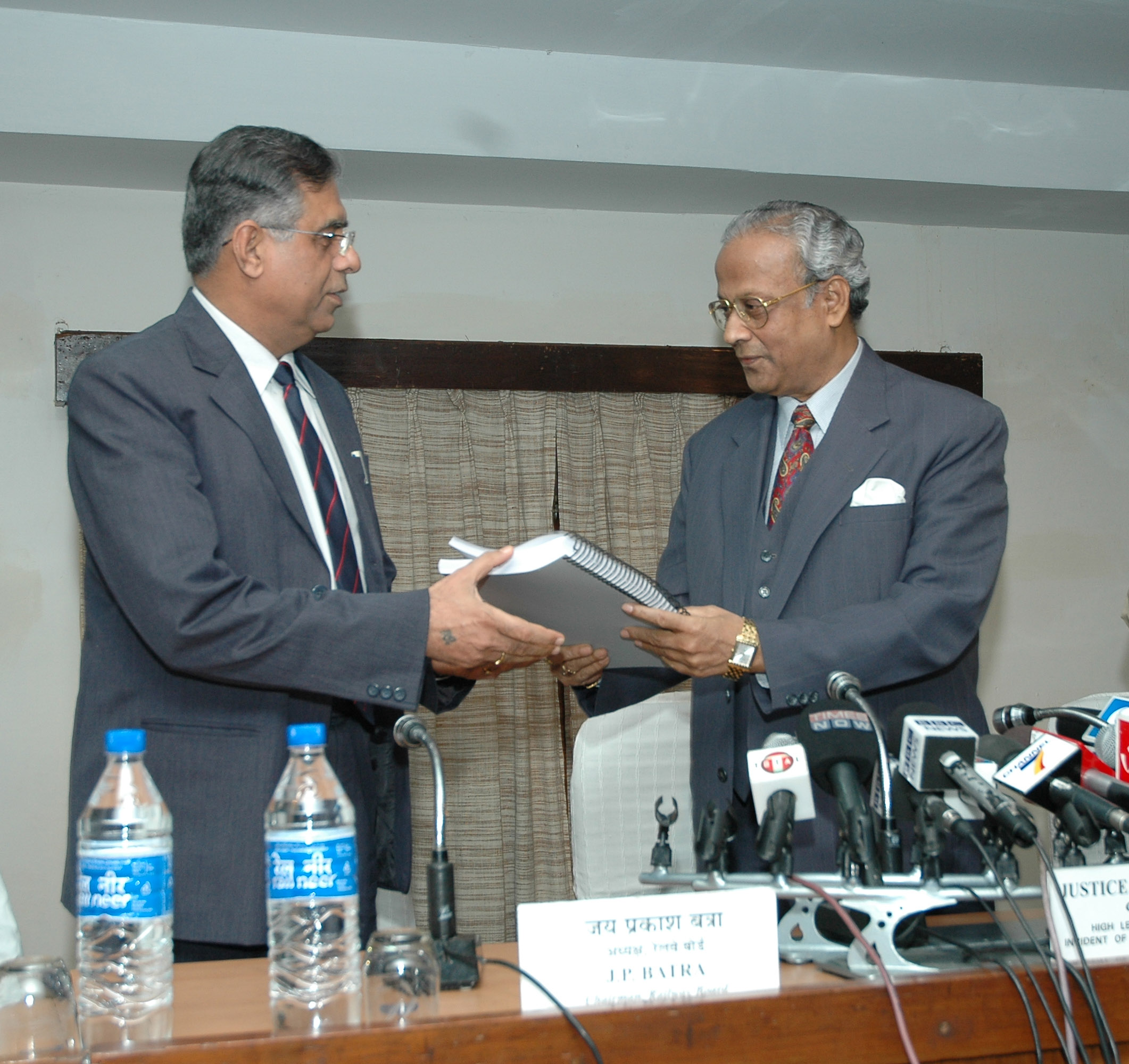
Justice U.C. Banerjee, presenting the final report of enquiry on Godhra fire incident to the Chairman Railway Board, J.P. Batra, in New Delhi on March 3, 2006

In 2005, he served as chairman of the committee constituted by the Government of India to investigate the fire in Sabarmati Express at Godhra in the state of Gujarat, that led to 59 deaths. He concluded that the fire was accidental and not started by the Muslim mob. He also came down heavily on the Railway administration for failing to conduct a statutory inquiry into the accident, which he held was in breach of the Railway Act as well as the Accident Manual of the Zonal Railway. He also pulled up the authorities for not making concerted efforts to preserve clues of the incident, instead choosing to dispose of the damaged portion of the S7 coach 'as scrap'.

He served as an advisor and adjunct professor at the Rajiv Gandhi School of Intellectual Property Law of the Indian Institute of Technology Kharagpur. He also served as a governing council member at the Scottish Church College in Calcutta, the National Law School of India University at Bangalore, and at the Nalsar University of Law in Hyderabad. He was also the founder president of the National Academy of Legal Studies and Research.

Later in 2006 Gujarat High Court termed the appointment of the high-level Justice U.C. Banerjee panel that probed the Godhra train carnage as "unconstitutional, illegal and void". The formation of the commission was challenged by a victim Neelkanth Bhatia, who contended that there was already a commission probing the fire. Upholding the argument of the petitioner, the order passed by Justice DN Patel, stated: "The Railways has no authority to appoint such a committee as it was in gross violation of provisions of sections of the Indian Railways Act." It also dismissed the right of the railways to set up a high-level committee to ascertain how a fire had started on its own property, in order to make sure that it did not happen again.

The Banerjee committee report was also dismissed by R. K. Raghavan, who headed the Special Investigation Team (SIT) set up by the Supreme Court of India to investigate the 2002 Gujarat riots.

On Feb 11, 2005, Raghavan wrote in his column in The Hindu

"The controversy surrounding the Banerjee Committee report on the Godhra incident highlights the need to develop high-quality scientific institutions that could help the judiciary arrive at the truth.

Indian polity cannot sink lower. The debate over former Supreme Court Judge U.C. Banerjee's report on the Godhra train tragedy of 2002 is proof that many elements in our public life will not hesitate to exploit the deaths of innocent citizens to their advantage. What is more unfortunate is that a former Judge of the highest court in the land is caught in the crossfire between political adversaries determined to capitalise on the loss of 59 lives."

However, even as a special court in Ahmedabad on February 23, 2011 accepted the Nanavati Commission report regarding the Godhra train burning that it was a well planned conspiracy to kill Hindus returning from Ayodhya, Banerjee told the press that he stood by his inquiry's conclusions "200%".

"I stand by my report 200% that it was an accidental fire in a coach of the Sabarmati Express at Godhra station on February 27, 2002, and I will not deviate from that," he told PTI. He said he had prepared his inquiry report after extensively going into all aspects and examining 80 witnesses before finalising his conclusion. To a question, he said his report was never guided by any political considerations and was strictly based on evidences.
