= Lalitha Kanneganti =

Judge of Karnataka High Court

Hon'ble Ms. Justice Kanneganti Lalithakumari

Judge of Karnataka High Court
- Incumbent
- Assumed office 28 July 2023
- Nominated by: Dhananjaya Y. Chandrachud
- Appointed by: Droupadi Murmu

Judge of Telangana High Court
- In office 15 November 2021 – 27 July 2023
- Nominated by: N. V. Ramana
- Appointed by: Ram Nath Kovind

Judge at Andhra Pradesh High Court
- In office 2 May 2020 – 14 November 2021
- Nominated by: Sharad Arvind Bobde
- Appointed by: Ram Nath Kovind

Personal details
- Born: Lalitha Kanneganti; 5 May 1971 (age 55) Bapatla, Guntur district, Andhra Pradesh, India
- Spouse: K Vijaya Prasad
- Children: Gautam; Maanasa
- Parent(s): K A Choudary; K Amareswari
- Education: Padala Rama Reddi Law College, Osmania University

Kanneganti Lalithakumari (born 5 May 1971) is an Indian judge, currently serving on the Karnataka High Court. She is a former judge of Telangana High Court and Andhra Pradesh High Court.

== Early life and education ==
She was born in Cheruvu Jammulapalem village. After attending St. Theresa's and Nagarjuna Junior College in Hyderabad she graduated with a Bachelor of Arts degree from Vanitha Mahavidyalaya Nampally Hyderabad in 1991. Thereafter, she obtained a Bachelor of Laws degree from Padala Rama Reddi Law College, Osmania University in 1994.

== Career ==
She enrolled as an Advocate on 28 December 1994 in the composite Bar Council of Andhra Pradesh and commenced practice by joining the chambers of Sri M.R.K. Choudary, Sri K. Harinath and Sri O.Manohar Reddy and developed independent practice within a short span of time.

She practiced in all areas of law including Civil, Criminal, Constitutional, Taxation, Service, Non-Service, Motor Accident Claims and Matrimonial Cases. She was the Standing Counsel for Agriculture Market Committees, English and Foreign Languages University, Tirumala Tirupati Devasthanams, Endowments, Sri Venkateswara Vedic University, Sri Venkateswara Institute of Medical Sciences (SVIMS) and Sanskrit University, Tirupati.

She was elevated as a judge of Andhra Pradesh High Court on 2 May 2020. She was transferred as judge of Telangana High Court on 15 November 2021. She was transferred as judge of Karnataka High Court on 28 July 2023.

== Notable judgements ==
- Covid-19 migrant worker crisis (K. Ramakrishna vs Union of India)
- Vizag LG polymer gas leak (Suo motu PIL)
- Suo motu for non compliance of orders on medical examination
- Decongestion of prisons - Release of all convicts, under trial prisoners on interim bail for 90 days
- Guidelines for Prompt Transmission of Bail Orders
- Implemented Arnesh Kumar Guidelines issued by the Supreme Court
