= Sarasa Venkatanarayana Bhatti =

Judge of the Supreme Court of India

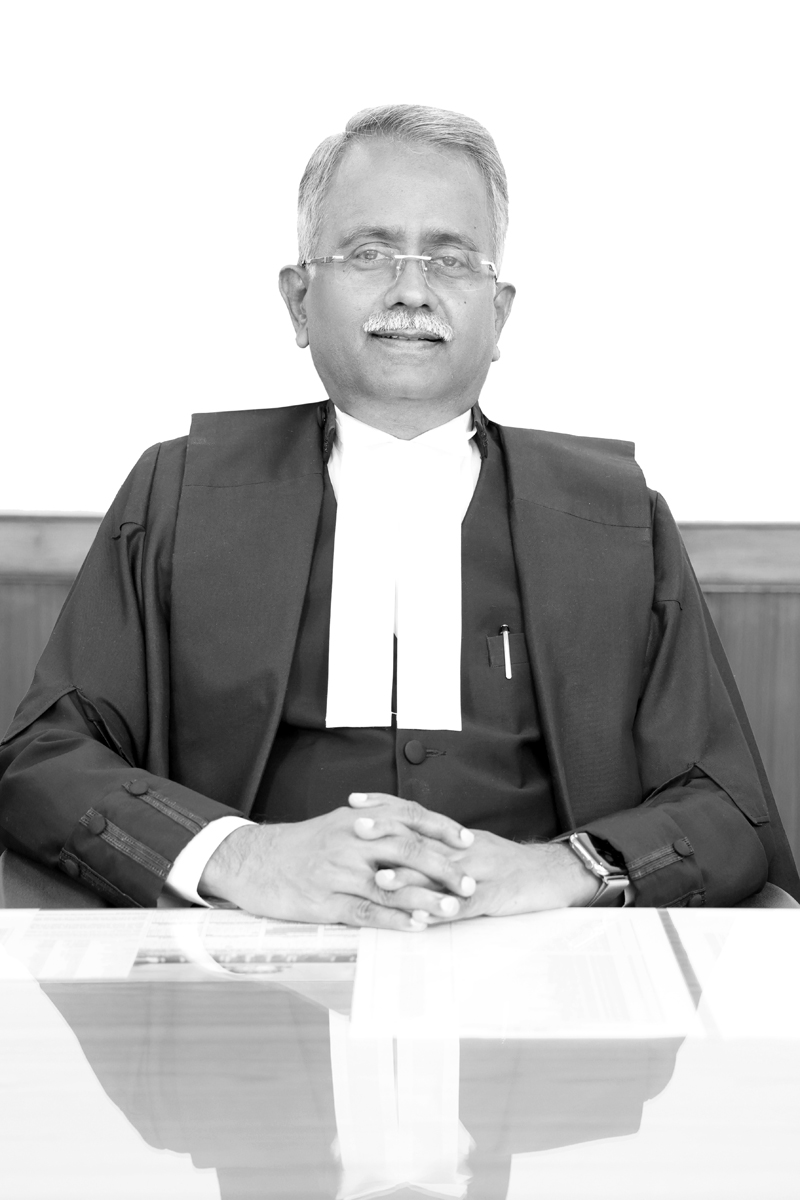

Judge of the Supreme Court of India
- Incumbent
- Assumed office 14 July 2023
- Nominated by: Dhananjaya Y. Chandrachud
- Appointed by: Droupadi Murmu

37th Chief Justice of the Kerala High Court
- In office 1 June 2023 – 13 July 2023
- Nominated by: Dhananjaya Y. Chandrachud
- Appointed by: Droupadi Murmu
- Preceded by: S. Manikumar
- Succeeded by: Ashish Jitendra Desai

Acting Chief Justice of the Kerala High Court
- In office 24 April 2023 – 31 May 2023
- Appointed by: Droupadi Murmu

Judge of the Kerala High Court
- In office 19 March 2019 – 23 April 2023
- Nominated by: Ranjan Gogoi
- Appointed by: Ram Nath Kovind

Judge of the Andhra Pradesh High Court
- In office 12 April 2013 – 18 March 2019
- Nominated by: Altamas Kabir
- Appointed by: Pranab Mukherjee

Personal details
- Born: 6 May 1962 (age 64) Madanapalle, Chittoor, AP
- Parents: Ramakrishnaiah (father); Annapurnamma (mother)
- Education: Jagadguru Renukacharya College, Bengaluru

Sarasa Venkatanarayana Bhatti (born 6 May 1962) is a judge of the Supreme Court of India and a former chief justice of the Kerala High Court. He has also served as the acting chief justice of the Kerala High Court and judge of the Kerala High Court and Andhra Pradesh High Court.

== Early life and education ==
Bhatti was born to Ramakrishnaiah and Annapurnamma at Madanapalle, Chittoor, Andhra Pradesh. He attended Giri Rao Theosophical High School, Madanapalle for primary education, graduated in commerce from Beasant Theosophical College, Madanapalle and obtained a degree in law from Jagadguru Renukacharya College, Bengaluru.

== Career ==
Bhatti enrolled as an advocate on 21 January 1987 and started practicing in Andhra Pradesh High Court at Hyderabad. During his practice, he served as standing counsel for Hindustan Shipyard, Andhra Pradesh Pollution Control Board, Indian Maritime University, Bharat Heavy Electricals Limited, Bharat Electronics, BHPV, RSVP etc. and also served as Special Government Pleader during 2000–2003. On 12 April 2013 he was elevated as Additional Judge of High Court of Andhra Pradesh and served as judge of High Court of Judicature at Hyderabad for the State of Telangana and Andhra Pradesh until bifurcation and establishment of High Court of Andhra Pradesh at Amaravathi on 1 June 2014 and continued to serve at Amaravathi till 18 March 2019 and upon transfer, from 19 March 2019 he served as permanent judge of Kerala High Court and Chairman of Kerala High Court Legal Services Committee. He was appointed as acting chief justice of the Kerala High Court on 24 April 2023. He was appointed as chief justice of the Kerala High Court on 1 June 2023. He was appointed as the Judge of the Supreme Court of India on 14 July 2023.
