= B. P. Jeevan Reddy =

High Court of India judge

B.P. Jeevan Reddy (born 14 March 1932) is a former judge of Supreme Court of India.

== Early life and education ==
He completed his schooling at Chaderghat High School, Hyderabad, and law degree from Law College, Osmania University. He served as an Advocate of the Hyderabad High Court. He served as an additional judge of the High Court of Andhra Pradesh and was a permanent judge of that court too. He worked as a Chief Justice of Allahabad High Court before being elevated as a Supreme Court judge. Formerly, he was the chairman of the Law Commission of India, New Delhi. He is also the author of a Book Modern Power Politics (Publishers: Orient Longman and Company).

Justice B.P. Jeevan Reddy Centre for International Trade and Business Laws, a research center is at Nalsar University.

== See also ==
Nalsar University Research Centers
