= Amal Kumar Sarkar =

8th Chief Justice of India (1901-2001)

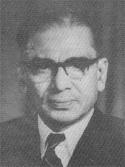

8th Chief Justice of India
- In office 16 March 1966 – 29 June 1966
- Appointed by: S. Radhakrishnan
- Preceded by: P. B. Gajendragadkar
- Succeeded by: K. Subba Rao

Judge of Supreme Court of India
- In office 4 March 1957 – 15 March 1966
- Nominated by: S. R. Das
- Appointed by: Rajendra Prasad

Judge of Calcutta High Court
- In office 25 January 1949 – 3 March 1957
- Appointed by: C. Rajagopalachari

Personal details
- Born: 29 June 1901 Dhaka, Bengal Presidency (present day Bangladesh)
- Died: 18 December 2001 (aged 100) Calcutta, India
- Education: LL.B
- Alma mater: Bangabasi College, Calcutta University

Justice Amal Kumar Sarkar (Bengali: অমল কুমার সরকার) (29 June 1901 – 18 December 2001) was the eighth Chief Justice of India, from 16 March 1966 up to his retirement on 29 June 1966.

== Education ==
He studied at the prestigious Scottish Churches College, the Bangabasi College, and at the University Law College, all affiliated with the University of Calcutta. He completed his LL. B. in 1926 and was called to bar from Lincoln's Inn in 1929 and enrolled as advocate in Calcutta High Court in 1930.

== Life ==
He started his career by practising as an advocate in the Calcutta High Court at Kolkata. He became a judge at the Calcutta High Court on 25 January 1949, and went on to become Supreme Court Judge in March 1957 despite being sixth in seniority in Calcutta High Court.

As a Supreme Court judge, Sarkar authored 228 judgments and sat on 653 benches and he is often remembered for writing 69 separate opinions, of which some concurred with judgment while other dissented.

Legal offices
Preceded by P. B. Gajendragadkar	Chief Justice of India; 16-03-1966 – 29.6.66	Succeeded by Koka Subba Rao
