= Madan Lokur =

Indian jurist (born 1953)

Madan Bhimrao Lokur
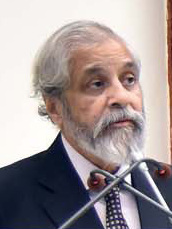
- Lokur in 2017

Chairman, UN Internal Justice Council
- Incumbent
- Assumed office 19 December 2024
- Appointed by: António Guterres

Judge of the Supreme Court of India
- In office 4 June 2012 – 30 December 2018
- Nominated by: S. H. Kapadia
- Appointed by: Pratibha Patil

Chief Justice of the Andhra Pradesh High Court
- In office 15 November 2011 – 3 June 2012
- Nominated by: S. H. Kapadia
- Appointed by: Pratibha Patil

Chief Justice of the Gauhati High Court
- In office 24 June 2010 – 14 November 2011
- Nominated by: S. H. Kapadia
- Appointed by: Pratibha Patil

Judge of the Delhi High Court
- In office 19 February 1999 – 23 June 2010
- Nominated by: Adarsh Sein Anand
- Appointed by: Kocheril Raman Narayanan

Additional Solicitor General of India
- In office 14 July 1998 – 18 February 1999
- Appointed by: Kocheril Raman Narayanan

Personal details
- Born: 31 December 1953 (age 72)
- Education: Faculty of Law, University of Delhi

Madan Bhimarao Lokur (born 31 December 1953) is an Indian jurist. He is Chairperson, United Nations Internal Justice Council. He is a former judge of the Supreme Court of India. He is also a former chief justice of the Andhra Pradesh High Court and Gauhati High Court and judge of the Delhi High Court.

== Education ==
Lokur was educated at the Modern School, New Delhi. He later attended St. Joseph's College, Allahabad for his ISC examinations. For his university studies, Lokur graduated in history from St. Stephen's College, Delhi University with honours. He obtained his law degree from Faculty of Law, University of Delhi.

== Judgeship ==
Lokur was appointed as an additional judge of the Delhi High Court on 19 February 1999, and as a permanent judge on 5 July 1999.

He also functioned as the acting chief justice of the Delhi High Court from 13 February 2010 to 21 May 2010 before being transferred as the chief justice of the Gauhati High Court from 24 June 2010 to 14 November 2011 and High Court of Judicature at Hyderabad from 15 November 2011 to 3 June 2012.

He was elevated as a judge of the Supreme Court on 4 June 2012. He retired as the senior most judge of Supreme Court on 30 December 2018. He is now a judge of the non-resident panel of the Supreme Court of Fiji, and the first former Indian judge to become a judge of a foreign country.

== Notable judgements and decisions ==
=== Minority sub-quota ===
In May 2012, Andhra Pradesh High Court Divisional Bench consisting of Chief Justice Madan Lokur and Justice P. V. Sanjay Kumar struck down the government of India's decision to allocate 4.5% sub-quota (within the 27% Other Backward Classes quota) for minorities. The bench held that the sub-quota was based on religion and not on any other intelligible consideration. The court criticised the decision by saying, "In fact, we must express our anguish at the rather casual manner in which the entire issue has been taken up by the central government."

=== Illegal mining scam ===
As the Chief Justice of the Andhra Pradesh High Court, Lokur suspended Special CBI Judge T Pattabhirama Rao and ordered his prosecution in a Mining scam case relating to the Reddy brothers. The complaint against the judge was that he granted bail to G. Janardhana Reddy after receiving a bribe.
