= Challa Kondaiah =

Chief Justice of Andhra Pradesh High Court
- In office 1979–1980
- Preceded by: Avula Sambasiva Rao
- Succeeded by: Alladi Kuppu Swami

Personal details
- Born: 4 July 1918 Anantapur district, Andhra Pradesh
- Died: 2001

Challa Kondaiah (Telugu: చల్లా కొండయ్య; 1918–2001) was an Indian judge who served as Chief Justice of Andhra Pradesh High Court.

He was born on 4 July 1918 at Challavaripalle in Anantapur district to Challa Venkata Kondaiah and Laxmamma. He graduated from Government Arts College in Anantapur and received his Bachelor of Law from Madras Law College. He did Civil, Criminal and Taxation work in Madras High Court, High Court of Andhra at Guntur and High Court of Andhra Pradesh, Hyderabad. He was appointed Standing Counsel for Income Tax Department in 1958. He was appointed as a permanent judge on 21 August 1967. He was transferred to Madhya Pradesh High Court on 24 June 1976. He was judge of Andhra Pradesh High Court again from 27 October 1977. He was Chief Justice of Andhra Pradesh from 16 March 1979 till 3 July 1980.

Government of Andhra Pradesh appointed Justice Challa Kondaiah Commission in 1987. Based on its recommendations, the government has made an Endowment Act to end the Hereditary rights of Archakas in the Temples of Andhra Pradesh.

He was chairman of Tirumala Tirupati Devasthanams and initiated the Nitya Annadana Scheme, a food service to the devotees.

A spacious auditorium for Anantapur Bar Association for their cultural, social and recreational activities with a seating capacity of 1,000 was constructed in 2005. It was named as Justice Challa Kondaiah Auditorium. A statue of Challa Kondaiah was also installed in the premises.

== Notes ==
- Luminaries of 20th Century, Potti Sreeramulu Telugu University, Hyderabad, 2005.
