= Koka Subba Rao =

9th Chief Justice of India

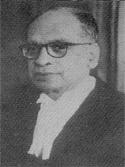
- Koka Subba Rao photo in 1955

9th Chief Justice of India
- In office 30 June 1966 – 11 April 1967
- Appointed by: S. Radhakrishnan
- Preceded by: Amal Kumar Sarkar
- Succeeded by: Kailas Nath Wanchoo

Judge of Supreme Court of India
- In office 31 January 1958 – 29 June 1966
- Nominated by: S. R. Das
- Appointed by: Rajendra Prasad

1st Chief Justice of Andhra Pradesh High Court
- In office 1 November 1956 – 30 January 1958
- Appointed by: Rajendra Prasad
- Preceded by: Position established
- Succeeded by: P. Chandra Reddy

Chief Justice of Andhra High Court
- In office 5 July 1954 – 31 October 1956
- Appointed by: Rajendra Prasad
- Preceded by: Nawab Alam yar jung Bahadur
- Succeeded by: Position abolished

Judge of Madras High Court
- In office 22 March 1948 – 4 July 1954
- Appointed by: C. Rajagopalachari

Personal details
- Born: 15 July 1902 Rajahmundry, Madras Presidency, British India
- Died: 6 May 1976 (aged 73)
- Education: Government Arts College, Rajahmundry

Koka Subba Rao (15 July 1902 – 6 May 1976) was the ninth Chief Justice of India (1966–1967). He also served as the Chief Justice of the Andhra Pradesh High Court.

== Early life ==
He was born into a Velama family at Rajamahendravaram on the banks of Godavari River in present day Andhra Pradesh. His father, a lawyer, died early. Rao graduated from the Government Arts College, Rajamundry and studied law at Madras Law College. He was a good sportsman.

== Professional life ==
He joined the office of his father-in-law, P. Venkata Raman Rao Naidu, who was a junior of the Andhra Kesari Prakasam Pantulu. He was recruited as District Munsif and worked for a few months in Bapatla, Guntur district.

After Venkata Raman Rao was elevated as judge of Madras High Court, Subbarao partnered with his gifted brother-in-law P. V. Rajamannar, who later became Advocate-General and Chief Justice of Madras High Court. They commanded the cream of legal work from all parts of composite Madras state. He was elevated to the Bench on 22 March 1948.

After the separation of Andhra, Rajaji wanted to send Govinda Menon, a senior judge to head the Andhra Pradesh High Court to be established in Guntur in 1954. But Prakasam insisted on having Subbarao as the Special Officer to facilitate the formation of High Court. Automatically he became the Chief Justice.

When Sri Venkateswara University was established at Tirupati in 1954, Subbarao became its first Chancellor and remained in the position till the University Act was amended restoring the Chancellorship to the Governor.

After tenures as a judge at Madras High Court and a Chief Justice at Andhra Pradesh High Court, he was appointed a Supreme Court judge on 31 January 1958. He was appointed Chief Justice of India on 30 June 1966. His most famous judgment was for the landmark Golaknath v. State of Punjab case where he ruled that fundamental rights could not be amended.

Subba Rao retired on 11 April 1967 to contest the fourth presidential elections as the consensus candidate of opposition parties.

== Golaknath Case ==
The Judgment of Subba Rao, C.J., Shah, Sikri, Shelat and Vaidialingam, JJ. was delivered by Subba Rao, C.I. According to this Judgment-(i) the power to amend the Constitution is not to be found in Art. 368 but in Arts. 245, 246 and 248 read with Entry 97 of List 1; (ii) the amending power can not be used to abridge or take away the fundamental rights guaranteed in Part III of the Constitution; (iii) a law amending the Constitution is "Law" within the meaning of Art. 13(2) and (iv). The First, Fourth and Seventeenth Amendments though they abridged fundamental rights were valid in the past on the basis of earlier decisions of this Court and continue to be valid for the future. On the application of the doctrine of "prospective overruling", as enunciated in the judgment, the decision will have only prospective operation and Parliament will have no power to abridge or take away Fundamental Rights from the date of the judgment.

The Judgment of WANCHOO, BHARGAVA and MITTER, JJ. was delivered by WANCHOO, J. According to this Judgment (i) the power of amending the Constitution resides in Art. 368 and not in Arts. 245, 246 and 248, read with Entry 97 of List 1; (ii) there, are no restrictions on the power if the procedure in Art. 368 is followed and all the Parts of the Constitution including Part III can be amended, (iii) an amendment of the Constitution is not "'law" under Art. 13(2); and (iv) the doctrine of "prospective overruling" cannot be applied in India.

HIDAYATULLAH, J. delivered a separate judgment agreeing with SUBBA RAO, CJ. on the following two points: (i) that the power to amend the Constitution cannot be used to abridge or take away fundamental rights; and (ii) that a law amending the Constitution is "law" under Art. 13 (2). He agrees With WANCHOO, J. that the power to amend does not reside in Arts. 245 and 248 read with Entry 97 of List 1.

Art. 368, according to him, is sui generis and procedural and the procedure when correctly followed, results in an amendment. He does not rely on the doctrine of "prospective overruling". As regards the First, Fourth and Seventh Amendments, these having long endured and been acquiesced in, he does not treat the question of their validity as being before him. As regards the Seventeenth Amendment he finds sufficient support for it in the Constitution as amended by the First, Fourth and Seventh Amendments and holds that the new definition of "estate", introduced by the Amendment, though it is "law" under Art. 13 (2) and is an inroad into fundamental rights, is beyond the reach of the courts because it falls within the word "law" in Arts. 31 (1), (2), 2A and 31A(1). He, however, declares section 3 of the Seventeenth Amendment Act ultra vires the amending process as an illegitimate exercise of the amending power. [BACHAWAT and RAMASWAMI, JJ. delivered separate judgments concurring with WANCHOO, J.]

== Political life ==
He has contested for the President of India in 1967 as a candidate of united opposition parties. He lost the elections to Zakir Husain.

He died on 6 May 1976.

== Honours ==
- Bangalore University honoured him with Doctorate.

== Notes ==
- Luminaries of 20th Century, Potti Sreeramulu Telugu University, Hyderabad, 2005.
- Koka Subba Rao : Strong-Willed Judge in The Great Indian patriots, Volume 2, P. Rajeswar Rao, page. 178.

Legal offices
Preceded by Amal Kumar Sarkar	Chief Justice of India; 30 June 1966 – 11 April 1967	Succeeded by Kailas Nath Wanchoo
