= Narsing Rao Nandikonda =

Indian judge (born 1969)

Honourable Sri Justice Narsing Rao Nandikonda

Additional Judge of the High Court for the State of Telangana
- Incumbent
- Assumed office 25 January 2025

Personal details
- Born: 3 May 1969 (age 56) Secunderabad, Hyderabad, India
- Spouse: Neeraja
- Children: 2
- Occupation: Judge

Narsing Rao Nandikonda (born 3 May 1969) is an Indian judge currently serving as an additional judge at the Telangana High Court.

== Early life and education ==
Justice Narsing Rao Nandikonda was born on 3 May 1969 in Secunderabad, Hyderabad, to late Smt. Nandikonda Maneamma and late Sri Nandikonda Pentaiah. He completed his schooling at St. Mary's High School, Hyderabad. He obtained his law degree from PMR Law College, L.B. Nagar, Hyderabad, in 1994.

== Legal career ==
Justice Nandikonda enrolled as an advocate in 1995 and practiced in civil, criminal, and other branches of law, appearing before various courts in Hyderabad and Ranga Reddy Districts. He was a life member of the Bar Associations of the High Court, City Civil Court, and Ranga Reddy District Court until his selection as District and Sessions Judge in 2011.

In October 2022, Justice Nandikonda was elected as the President of the Telangana State Judges Association, which consists of 411 judges. He won the election by a margin of 87 votes, with the results announced on 30 October 2022.

== Personal life ==
Justice Nandikonda is married to Neeraja, and they have two sons.
