= Syed Shah Mohammed Quadri =

Syed Shah Mohammed Quadri (born April 5, 1938) is the former judge of Supreme Court of India (December 4, 1997 to April 5, 2003). He was also the judge of Andhra Pradesh High Court and was elevated to this position in July 1986 Judge Syed Shah Mohammed Quadri has been a part of many important judgements including the ISRO Espionage in 1988 and Rajeev Gandhi assassination.

== Early life and education ==
He completed his BA, LLB from Osmania University. He then completed his LLM from the University of London. He was called to the bar from Lincoln's Inn.

== Career ==
He also worked a part-time lecturer of law at the Osmania University between 1972 and 1981.
