= Pingle Jaganmohan Reddy =

Indian judge (1910-1999)

Hon'ble Justice Pingle Jaganmohan Reddy

Judge of Supreme Court of India
- In office 1 August 1969 – 22 January 1975
- Appointed by: M. Hidayatullah (Acting President of India)

6th Chief Justice of Andhra Pradesh High Court
- In office 19 July 1966 – 31 July 1969
- Appointed by: S. Radhakrishnan
- Preceded by: N. D. Krishna Rao
- Succeeded by: N. Kumarayya

Judge of Andhra Pradesh High Court
- In office 1 November 1956 – 18 July 1966
- Appointed by: Rajendra Prasad

Judge of Hyderabad High Court
- In office 16 February 1952 – 31 October 1956
- Appointed by: Rajendra Prasad

Additional Judge of Hyderabad High Court
- In office 25 February 1945 – 16 November 1946
- Appointed by: Mir Osman Ali Khan (Nizam of Hyderabad)

Personal details
- Born: 23 January 1910 Hyderabad State
- Died: 9 March 1999 (aged 89)
- Education: B.Com, B.A. and LL.B
- Alma mater: Trinity College, Cambridge

Pingle Jaganmohan Reddy (23 January 1910 – 9 March 1999) was an Indian judge who served as a judge of Supreme Court of India and Chief Justice of Andhra Pradesh High Court.

He practised in the High Courts of Bombay, Madras and Hyderabad during 1937–1946. He served as deputy Secretary, Government of Hyderabad, Additional Judge, District and Sessions Judge, Additional Judge High Court, Hyderabad from 25 February 1945 until 16 November 1946.

He was judge of Hyderabad High Court from 16 February 1952, Andhra Pradesh High Court judge between 1956 and 1966 and Chief Justice of Andhra Pradesh High Court between 1966–1969; he was a judge of the Supreme Court of India, from 1969 to 1975.

Member, Syndicate and Dean, faculty of Law, Osmania University between 1952–59 and Vice-Chancellor, Osmania University in 1975.

== Early life ==
Much of what we know of Reddy's early life draws from an autobiography that he published in 1993, titled The Revolutions I Have Lived Through.

Reddy was born on 23 January 1910 in the then-princely state of Hyderabad, in the village of Waddepally. His grandfather, Narasimha Reddy, had three sons: Jaganmohan Redd'ys father, Venkataramareddy, as well as Krishna Reddy and Ranga Reddy. Jaganmohan Reddy's father was adopted by his paternal uncle to be the heir, as his paternal uncle Ramachandra Reddy's only son died at the age of eleven. Reddy's adoptive and natural grandfathers both died young, leaving his father, Venkataramareddy to support his family at the age of fifteen. His father took pp the position of collecting tax revenues for the Nalgonda District, and married his mother in 1898: they were aged 16 and 13 respectively at the time of marriage. Reddy's father was mostly self-educated, and according to Reddy, placed great value on education, establishing the Reddy Boarding Girls' Hostel and Girls School in Hyderabad, as well as supporting the education of several female children in the extended family.

Reddy had five siblings, all born before him: his elder sister, Kamala, and his brother Manmohan Reddy both died in childhood. His surviving siblings included a sister, Kumudini, and two brothers, Janardhan, and Madhusudan. He spent his early childhood in Wadepally, while his siblings were being educated in Hyderabad. In addition to his contracts with the colonial government for the collection of various taxes, including excise tax, Reddy's father supported his family through a number of business interests based in Hyderabad, including cotton and ginning factories, and shell petrol and oil agencies.

Reddy married his wife, Sita, in 1935; he was 25 years old, and she was 16. Her name was changed to 'Pramila' after marriage. She attended school in England while Reddy completed his L.L.B. degree. He had two sons: the older one Ajith, born in 1939 and a daughter, Urmila, born in 1946.

== Education ==
Reddy's formal education began in a village school in Waddepally, his hometown, and continued in Hyderabad. He was briefly taught by the owner of a snuff tobacco shop, both, in the art of making snuff tobacco, as well as in the Telugu language. He continued his formal schooling with private tutors, and later at City High School in Hyderabad, and at St. George's Grammar School for Boys, also in Hyderabad, completing his Senior Cambridge exams there. He also briefly attended the Nizam College in Hyderabad, which was then affiliated to the University of Madras.

He travelled to England with the intention of becoming a doctor, studying for his Matriculation at the private Badingham College in Surrey initially, but transferring to a school in Leeds to be close to his brother, who was attending college there. He then enrolled in Leeds University, for a bachelor's degree in Commerce. Reddy states that he decided to take up the law as a profession following a series of events, including witnessing matters being argued in the Nizam's courts while visiting home, as well as a meeting with Muhammad Ali Jinnah, who advised him on how to establish a practice. His uncle, a Barrister, was then at Lincoln's Inn and Reddy attended several dinners there, eventually joining Gray's Inn in 1932. He studied law, completing both, a B.A. (Law Tripos) and an LL.B.at Cambridge University, at Trinity College.

== Career ==
=== Legal practice ===
After being called as a Barrister at Gray's Inn, Reddy read in the chambers of P.B. Morle for a year. He returned to India in 1937, joining the chambers of Jamshedji P. Kanga in Bombay. He moved to practice in the Madras High Court in 1938, joining the chambers of Duraiswamai Iyer. before eventually setting up an independent practice, where he handled criminal and civil matters. In 1940, he moved back to Hyderabad, to continue his practice. In Hyderabad, he practiced in High Court, subordinate courts and in the Revenue and Atiyat courts, handling primarily commercial matters.

Reddy also advised in the Government of Hyderabad on the establishment of a state bank for Hyderabad, including the drafting of the Hyderabad State Bank Act. He also advised the government in various other matters, including being held on retainer by state corporations such as the Hyderabad Commercial Corporation, and the Deccan Airways.

=== Academic work ===
In 1940, Reddy was invited by Kazi Mohammad Hussain, then the Vice-Chancellor of Osmania University, to teach as a part-time lecturer in law. He initially taught the law of torts in Urdu, but eventually gave up for practical reasons, in order to focus on his practice.

He also served as the Secretary of Reddy Hostel, a school established by the Raja Bahadur Venkatrama Reddy.

=== Legal reforms and government service ===
In 1946, the State of Hyderabad began reorganizing its judicial departments, which included both, legislative and legal functions. Reddy was invited to act as the Deputy Secretary for this department in April 1946, after negotiating to have this position be treated as the equivalent of judicial office. He briefly acted as Law Secretary, in the absence of the appointed Law Secretary, in 1947, for a period of one month. While serving in the Legal Department, Reddy was involved in the bills that included the Hyderabad Income Tax Act, and the Hyderabad Companies Act.

== 1971 Nagarwala scandal ==
A Commission of Inquiry was set up by Janata Party under Reddy on 9 June 1977, to probe into the 1971 Nagarwala scandal case.

== Publications ==
- The Hyderabad Excess Profits Tax Act
- Quest of Justice.

=== Reports ===
- Report on the 1969 Gujarat riots
  - Pingle Jagamohan Reddy; Nusserwanji K Vakil; Akbar S Sarela (1973). Report: Inquiry into the communal disturbances at Ahmedabad and other places in Gujarat on and after 18th September 1969. Commission of Inquiry on Communal Disturbances at Ahmedabad and at Various Places in the State of Gujarat on and after 18 September 1969, Home Department, Government of Gujarat.

=== Autobiographies ===
- Reddy, Pingle Jaganmohan (1993). The revolution I have lived through. Printwell. ISBN 9788170443056.
- Reddy, Pingle Jaganmohan (1999). The Judiciary I Served. Orient Blackswan. ISBN 9788125016175.
