= O. Chinnappa Reddy =

Indian judge (1922–2013)

- Born: Ontethupalli Chinnappa Reddy; 25 September 1922; Gooty, Anantapur district, Andhra Pradesh
- Died: 14 April 2013 (aged 90); Hyderabad, Andhra Pradesh
- Occupation: Judge of Supreme Court of India

O. Chinnappa Reddy (1922-2013) was a judge at the Supreme Court of India. He is known for his proactive judgements which changed the judicial history of India.

== Life ==
Chinnappa Reddy was born on 25 September 1922 at Gooty in a 5th generation Roman Catholic family in Anantapur district, Andhra Pradesh, India. He did his schooling at London Mission High School, Gooty and higher education at Loyola College and Madras Law College. He became permanent judge in 1967 at Andhra Pradesh High Court after serving as a lawyer for two decades. He was elevated to the Supreme Court in 1978 and retired in 1987. He died in 2013.
