= Anisetti Raghuvir =

16th Governor of Assam
- In office 21 July 1989 – 2 May 1990
- Preceded by: Harideo Joshi
- Succeeded by: Devi Das Thakur

Personal details
- Occupation: Jurist

Anisetti Raghuvir (22 March 1929 – 21 July 2007) was a Hyderabad High Court judge in India. He was later the Chief Justice of the Gauhati High Court. He was also the Governor of Assam.
