= P. Chandra Reddy =

Indian judge (1904-1976)

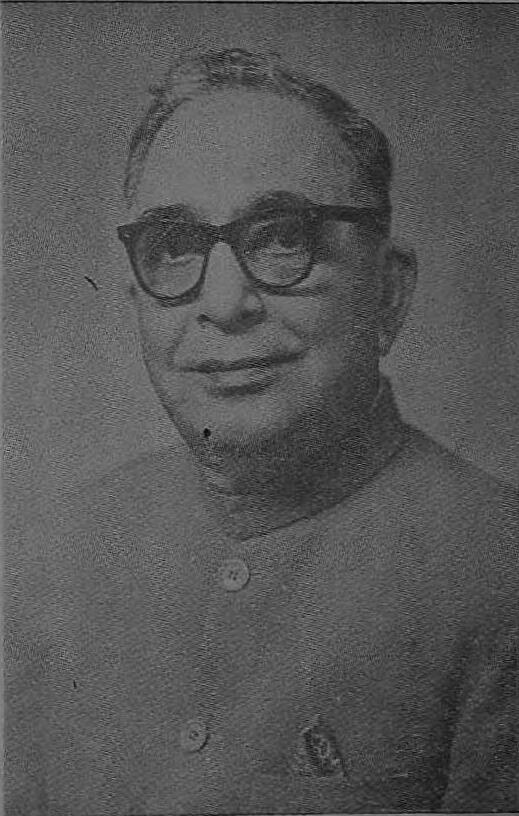

14th Chief Justice of Madras High Court
- In office 23 November 1964 – 1 July 1966
- Nominated by: P. B. Gajendragadkar
- Appointed by: S. Radhakrishnan
- Preceded by: S. Ramachandra Iyer
- Succeeded by: M. Anantanarayanan

2nd Chief Justice of Andhra Pradesh High Court
- In office 16 June 1958 – 22 November 1964
- Nominated by: Sudhi Ranjan Das
- Appointed by: Rajendra Prasad
- Preceded by: Koka Subba Rao
- Succeeded by: P. Satyanarayana Raju

Judge of Andhra Pradesh High Court
- In office 5 July 1954 – 15 June 1958
- Appointed by: Rajendra Prasad
- Acting Chief Justice
- In office 31 January 1958 – 15 June 1958
- Appointed by: Rajendra Prasad
- Preceded by: Koka Subba Rao
- Succeeded by: Himself

Judge of Madras High Court
- In office 16 July 1949 – 4 July 1954
- Appointed by: C. Rajagopalachari

Personal details
- Born: Palagani Chandra Reddy; 1 July 1904
- Died: 7 October 1976 (aged 72)

Justice P. Chandra Reddy or Palagani Chandra Reddy (1 July 1904 – 7 October 1976) was an Indian judge and chief justice of two High Courts of India. He was educated at V.R. High School, Nellore and Pachaiyappa’s College in Madras. He was appointed an advocate at the Madras High Court on 13 August 1928. He had practised civil and criminal cases. He was appointed an additional judge at the same court on 16 July 1949. He was appointed a permanent judge at Andhra State High Court on its formation from 5 July 1954, and later became the acting Chief Justice of the court. He was appointed the permanent Chief Justice of Andhra High Court on 16 June 1958.

He was the acting Governor of Andhra Pradesh from 20 December 1963 to 19 December 1964. He was appointed the Chief Justice of Madras High Court on 23 December 1964. He was the acting Governor of Tamil Nadu between 24 December 1964 and 7 February 1965. He retired on 7 January 1966. He died on 7 October 1976.
