= G. Rohini =

Indian judge

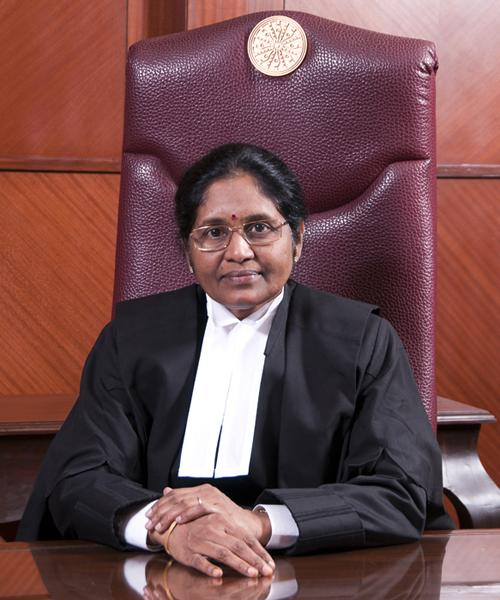

Chief Justice of Delhi High Court
- In office 21 April 2014 – 13 April 2017
- Nominated by: Collegium of Supreme Court of India
- Appointed by: Pranab Mukherjee
- Preceded by: N. V. Ramana
- Succeeded by: Acting Gita Mittal

Personal details
- Born: 14 April 1955 (age 71) Visakhapatnam, Andhra Pradesh, India

Gorla Rohini (born 14 April 1955) is a former Indian judge and currently head of a government commission investigating categories of Other Backward Classes in India. She was the first female Chief Justice of the Delhi High Court and also served as a judge on the Andhra Pradesh High Court.

== Early life ==
G. Rohini was born on 14 April 1955 in Visakhapatnam, Andhra Pradesh, India. She completed her bachelor's degree in science at Osmania University and law at Andhra University College of Law, Visakhapatnam.

== Career ==
=== Litigation ===
G. Rohini began her career as an advocate in Andhra Pradesh, working in the chambers of senior advocate Koka Raghava Rao from 1980 onwards. As an advocate, her practice focused on administrative and civil matters in courts in the State of Andhra Pradesh. She also worked on issues concerning the protection of the girl child and working women. She was also involved in legal journalism, as a reporter and served as executive editor of Andhra Pradesh Law Journals in 1985. In 1994, she was appointed a Government pleader, appearing for the Government of Andhra Pradesh in cases concerning environment, consumer affairs, labour, employment and civil service. She also served as the Chair of the Andhra Pradesh Bar Council.

=== Judge, Andhra Pradesh High Court ===
G. Rohini was appointed an additional judge on the Andhra Pradesh High Court on 25 June 2001, and became a permanent judge on 31 July 2002. During her tenure at the Andhra Pradesh High Court, Rohini was a judge in a number of significant decisions, including a judgment that allowed the state government to appoint special officers to local governments, as well as establishing quotas in local governments for Other Backward Classes.

While serving as a judge on the Andhra Pradesh High Court, Rohini was the head of the Andhra Pradesh State Legal Services Authority, and the High Court Juvenile Justice Committee, and released a manual on the rights of women. She was also the chairperson of the Andhra Pradesh Judicial Academy.

Chief Justice of the Delhi High Court

On 21 April 2014, G. Rohini was appointed Chief Justice of the Delhi High Court, and is the first female judge to hold that position. She succeeded Justice N.V. Ramana.

During her tenure as a judge in the Delhi High Court, G. Rohini was a judge in a number of cases concerning significant questions of constitutional law, such as the ongoing conflict regarding the division of state and central power in concerning the administration of the National Capital Territory of Delhi, the right to privacy on instant messaging platforms, and the audit of public power distribution companies by the Comptroller and Auditor General of India. Previously, she was the judge at Andhra Pradesh High Court. She retired as the Chief justice of Delhi High Court on 13 April 2017 on attaining superannuation.

=== Post-Judicial Appointments ===
==== Commission for Sub-Categorisation of OBCs ====
In October 2017, G. Rohini was appointed by President of India to head a five member commission to examine the sub-categorization of Other Backward Classes (OBC) under Article 340 of the Indian Constitution. In July 2022, the Commission received its thirteenth extension of time to complete this task, with a report now due on January 31, 2023. After 13 extensions to its tenure, Rohini Commission submitted its report to President Droupadi Murmu on 31 July 2023. The report is more than 1,000-pages long and is divided in two parts- the first part deals with how the OBC quota should be allocated; and the second part is an updated list of all 2,633 OBC castes across India.
