= N. Kumarayya =

Indian judge (1909–2005)

Chief Justice of Andhra Pradesh High Court
- In office 1969–1971
- Preceded by: P. Jagan Mohan Reddy
- Succeeded by: K. V. L. Narasimham

Personal details
- Born: 15 June 1909 British India
- Died: 9 January 2005 (aged 95)

Justice N. Kumarayya (15 June 1909 – 9 January 2005) was an Indian judge who served as the Chief Justice of the Andhra Pradesh High Court.

Kumarayya was educated at Middle School, Karimnagar, High School, Warangal and Osmania University, Hyderabad. He joined the Hyderabad Civil Service on 26 July 1931. He was appointed Munsif Magistrate in 1935, Additional District Magistrate in 1943, District Magistrate in 1946 and Sessions Judge in 1948. He was appointed judge of Hyderabad High Court in 1955 and was reappointed Additional Judge of High Court of Andhra Pradesh in 1956. He was appointed permanent Judge of this High Court with effect from 22 October 1957. He was appointed Chief Justice of Andhra Pradesh in 1969 and retired on 15 June 1971.
