= Alladi Kuppu Swamy =

Alladi Kuppu Swami

Chief Justice of Andhra Pradesh High Court
- In office 1980–1982
- Preceded by: Challa Kondaiah
- Succeeded by: K.Madhava Reddy

Personal details
- Born: 23 March 1920
- Died: 12 March 2012

Justice Alladi Kuppuswami B.A., B.L. (1920-2012) was an Indian judge and one-time Chief Justice of Andhra Pradesh High Court.

He was the son of politician Alladi Krishnaswamy Iyer and born on 23 March 1920. He was educated at Loyola College and Law College, Madras. He did B.A. (Hons.) Mathematics Degree in First Class in 1939 and studied Law in 1939–41. He worked as apprentice under late Sri V. Govindarajachari and enrolled as an Advocate in 1942. He was a member of the Andhra Pradesh Bar Council – 1961–67.

He died of cardiac arrest in Hyderabad, Andhra Pradesh on 12 March 2012.
