= Yogeshwar Dayal =

Indian judge (1930–1994)

Yogeshwar Dayal (18 November 1930 – 2 August 1994) was a former judge of the Supreme Court of India.

== Early life ==
Dayal was born in the family of Lala Hardayal at Lahore, British India in 1930. His father L. Bhagwat Dayal was a barrister and senior practicing lawyer. He studied in Government College University (Lahore) and Bachelor of Missions Colleges in Shimla. Dayal passed Law from the University of Delhi in 1953.

== Career ==
Dayal started practice in Delhi in 1953 and Punjab High Court. After the formation of Delhi High Court in 1966 he shifted to New Delhi and served as lawyer for Delhi Administration and various corporate bodies. On 28 February 1974 he was elevated as Judge of the Delhi High Court. In his tenure Dayal was appointed One-Man Commission of Inquiry in number of occasions. In 1987 he became the Chief Justice of Delhi High Court thereafter transferred as Chief Justice of Andhra Pradesh High Court on 18 March 1988. He was appointed a Judge of the Supreme Court of India on 22 March 1991. Justice Dayal retired on 17 November 1995 from the judgeship.
