= Kalyan Jyoti Sengupta =

Indian judge (born 1953)

Hon'ble Justice Kalyan Jyoti Sengupta

Lokayukta, Sikkim
- Incumbent
- Assumed office 18 May 2015

Chief Justice Andhra Pradesh High Court
- In office 21 May 2013 – 6 May 2015

Judge Calcutta High Court
- In office 17 July 1997 – 18 November 2012

Judge High Court of Uttarakhand
- In office 18 November 2012 – 20 May 2013

Personal details
- Born: 7 May 1953 (age 72) Baidyapur, Tenya, Murshidabad district, West Bengal, India
- Citizenship: Indian

Kalyan Jyoti Sengupta (born 7 May 1953) is retired Indian judge, a former Chief Justice of Andhra Pradesh High Court and Chancellor of NALSAR University of Law, Hyderabad. He has been the Chief Justice since 21 May 2013.

== Career ==
Sengupta was enrolled as an advocate on 21 April 1981. He practised in the Calcutta High Court in Civil, Constitutional, Criminal matters and Arbitration matters. He was appointed a permanent Judge of the Calcutta High Court in 1997. He used to work as acting Chief Justice at Calcutta High Court.
