= Katikithala Ramaswamy =

Indian judge (1932–2019)

Judge of the Supreme Court of India
- In office 6 October 1989 – 12 July 1997
- Nominated by: Engalaguppe Seetharamiah Venkataramiah
- Appointed by: Ramaswamy Venkataraman

Judge of the Andhra Pradesh High Court
- In office 26 November 1982 – 6 October 1989
- Nominated by: Y. V. Chandrachud
- Appointed by: Zail Singh

Personal details
- Born: 13 July 1932 West Godavari district, Andhra Pradesh, India
- Died: 6 March 2019 (aged 86) Domalguda, Hyderabad, Telangana

Katikithala Ramaswamy (13 July 1932 – 6 March 2019) was a former judge of the Supreme Court of India.

== Early life ==
K. Ramaswamy was born into a poor family at Western Godavari district, Madras Presidency, British India.

He did B.A from West Godavari Bhimavaram College and LLB from Andhra University College of Law.

== Career ==
In 1962 he got enrolled as an advocate and practised in Civil & Criminal cases. He worked as additional public prosecutor and government pleader till 1972 to 1974. He got appointed as Sr. Standing Counsel for Andhra Pradesh State Electricity Board and additional judge of Andhra Pradesh High Court and served till 1982.

Later he became a permanent Judge of the Andhra Pradesh High Court and vice-president, International Jurists Organisation (Asia).

Among the notable judgments authored by Justice Ramaswamy is the 1995 judgment in C Ravichandran Iyer v Justice AM Bhattacharjee and served as the Executive Chairman of the National Legal Services Authority (NALSA). He is also popularly known for Samata Judgement that upheld the rights of tribals on their lands in tribal areas.

Justice Ramaswamy was also member of National Human Rights Commission.

== Personal life ==
He died at his home in Hyderabad due to minor ailments. He had two daughters; his son K. Srinivas is an IAS officer of Gujarat cadre.
