= B. J. Divan =

6th Chief Justice of Gujarat High Court

Hon'ble Chief Justice (Retd.) Bipinchandra Jivanlal Divan

6th Chief Justice of Gujarat High Court
- In office 28 August 1977 – 19 August 1981
- Appointed by: Neelam Sanjiva Reddy
- Preceded by: S. Obul Reddy; J. B. Mehta (acting)
- Succeeded by: M. P. Thakkar
- In office 18 July 1973 – 30 June 1976
- Appointed by: V. V. Giri
- Preceded by: P. N. Bhagwati
- Succeeded by: S. Obul Reddy; J. B. Mehta (acting)

11th Chief Justice of Andhra Pradesh High Court
- In office 1 July 1976 – 19 August 1977
- Appointed by: Fakhruddin Ali Ahmed
- Preceded by: S. Obul Reddy
- Succeeded by: S. Obul Reddy

Judge of Gujarat High Court
- In office 19 April 1962 – 17 July 1973
- Nominated by: B. P. Sinha
- Appointed by: Rajendra Prasad

Personal details
- Born: 20 August 1919
- Died: 12 March 2012 (aged 92) Ahmedabad
- Education: M.A. and LL.B, Wilson College, Mumbai, Government Law College, Bombay

Bipinchandra Jivanlal Divan (1919–2012) was an Indian judge. He was the Chief Justice of Gujarat and Andhra Pradesh High Courts, and Acting Governor of Andhra Pradesh.

== Life and education ==
He was born on 20 August 1919. He was educated at Proprietary High School, Ahmedabad, Wilson College and Government Law College, Bombay and University School of Economics and Sociology, Bombay and have degrees of Master of Arts and LLB.

He was the first 'centurion' (Note: In the context of health and volunteering, a Centurion Donor is a person who has reached the significant milestone of 100 blood donations. This term is a mark of honour for long-term commitment to saving lives.) blood donor from Ahmedabad and as well from judiciary. His nephew Anil B. Divan was senior advocate in Supreme Court of India and notable constitutional expert.

He died on 12 March 2012.

== Career ==
He was enrolled as an Advocate of Bombay High Court on the Appellate Side in September, 1941 and on the Original Side in September, 1943 and practiced there from 1943 to 1954. He was appointed judge, Bombay City Civil Court, and additional sessions judge, Greater Bombay, on 4 November 1954 and principal judge, Bombay City Civil Court, and sessions judge, Greater Bombay, on 1 May 1961.

Diwan was appointed judge at the civil court at the age of 35 and was High Court judge at 45 when he was appointed additional judge of Gujarat High Court from 19 April 1962 and made permanent judge with effect from 23 September 1963.

He was appointed chief justice, Gujarat High Court, from 17 July 1973. He was transferred to Andhra Pradesh High Court with effect from 1 July 1976. He was acting governor of Andhra Pradesh from 17 February 1977 till 5 May 1977. He was again transferred to Gujarat High Court as chief justice with effect from 28 August 1977 and retired on 20 August 1981.

Government offices
| Preceded by R. D. Bhandare | Governor of Andhra Pradesh; 1977 – 1977 | Succeeded by Sharda Mukherjee |
