= Saiyed Saghir Ahmad =

Indian judge (1935–2011)

Hon'ble Justice Saiyed Saghir Ahmad

23rd Chief Justice of Andhra Pradesh High Court
- In office 23 September 1994 – 5 March 1995
- Nominated by: M. N. Venkatachaliah
- Appointed by: Shankar Dayal Sharma
- Preceded by: Sundaram Nainar Sundaram
- Succeeded by: Prabha Shankar Mishra

17th Chief Justice of Jammu and Kashmir High Court
- In office 18 March 1994 – 22 September 1994
- Nominated by: M. N. Venkatachaliah
- Appointed by: Shankar Dayal Sharma
- Preceded by: Satish Chandra Mathur
- Succeeded by: M. Ramakrishna

Judge of Jammu and Kashmir High Court
- In office 1 November 1993 – 17 March 1994
- Nominated by: M. N. Venkatachaliah
- Appointed by: Shankar Dayal Sharma

Judge of Allahabad High Court
- In office 2 November 1981 – 31 October 1993
- Nominated by: Y. V. Chandrachud
- Appointed by: Neelam Sanjiva Reddy

Personal details
- Born: 1 July 1935
- Died: 31 January 2011 (aged 75)
- Education: Aligarh Muslim University

Saiyed Saghir Ahmad (1 July 1935 – 31 January 2011) was a judge of the Supreme Court of India.

== Early life ==
Saghir Ahmad received his early education at Christian College Lucknow. After passing the Intermediate examination, he went to Aligarh and obtained his BSc from Aligarh Muslim University. He returned to Lucknow to follow in the footsteps of his father, Syed Mohammed Husain, and joined the legal profession after obtaining a law degree from the University of Lucknow.

== Career ==
Saghir Ahmad enrolled as an Advocate of the Allahabad High Court on 6 December 1961. He practiced civil law before the Lucknow Bench. He became Standing Counsel of the Uttar Pradesh Government in 1976 and of the Northern Railway in 1971. He was appointed Additional Judge of Allahabad High Court on 2 November 1981 and permanent Judge on 30 December 1982.

He was transferred to the Jammu & Kashmir High Court on 1 November 1993. He was appointed the Chief Justice of Jammu & Kashmir High Court on 18 March 1994. He was transferred as Chief Justice of Andhra Pradesh High Court on 23 September 1994. He was appointed as judge of the Supreme Court of India on 6 March 1995 and retired on 30 June 2000.

== Death ==
Saghir Ahmad died on 31 January 2011, after a week of hospitalization with respiratory distress. He was 75.
