= Devinder Gupta =

Indian judge (1943–2024)

Devinder Gupta (4 April 1943 – 17 June 2024) was an Indian judge who was a Chief Justice of the Andhra Pradesh High Court.

== Life and career ==
Gupta hailed from Shimla. After completion of LL.B. he started work as an advocate on 23 March 1967. Initially he practiced in the District Courts of Himachal Pradesh and the High Court. On 25 June 1990, Gupta was appointed an additional Judge of the Himachal Pradesh High Court and transferred to Delhi High Court in 1994. Gupta also served as acting Chief Justice in Delhi High Court at different times. He became the Executive Chairman of Delhi State Legal Services Authority. Justice Gupta was appointed Chief Justice of Andhra Pradesh High Court on 10 March 2003 and retired on 4 April 2005. Gupta died on 17 June 2024, at the age of 81.

He was founding member of Lodge Kinner Kailash No. 320 GLI, Shimla.
