= Alladi Krishnaswamy Iyer =

Indian politician

Sir Alladi Krishnaswamy Ayyar
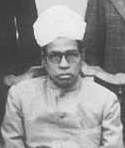
- Alladi Krishnaswamy Iyer

Member of Parliament, Rajya Sabha (Nominated)
- In office 3 April 1952 – 3 October 1953

Member of Constituent Assembly of India
- In office 9 December 1946 – 24 January 1950

Advocate General of Madras Presidency
- In office 1929–1944
- Preceded by: T. R. Venkatarama Sastri
- Succeeded by: P. V. Rajamannar

Personal details
- Born: 14 May 1883 Pudur town, Madras Presidency, British Raj (present day Nellore district, Andhra Pradesh)
- Died: 3 October 1953 Madras, Madras State (now Tamil Nadu), India
- Spouse: Venkalakshmamma

Dewan Bahadur Sir Alladi Krishnaswamy Iyer (14 May 1883 – 3 October 1953) was an Indian lawyer and member of the Constituent Assembly of India, which was responsible for framing the Constitution of India. He also served as the advocate general of Madras State from 1929 to 1944.

== Early life ==
Krishnaswamy Iyer was born in British Raj India to a Tamil Brahmin family in 1883 in the small village of Pudur in Madras State (present day Nellore district of Andhra Pradesh). His father, Ekamra Sastry, was a priest. Krishnaswamy passed his matriculation examination in 1899 and joined the Madras Christian College to study history. He used his spare time to attend classes in law and passed the B.L. exam and became one of the leading members of the bar. He was made a Dewan Bahadur in 1930 and knighted in the 1932 New Year Honours list.

== Career ==
He was the Advocate General of the Madras Presidency from 1929 to 1944. He played a major role in drafting the Constitution of India. In 1951, Iyer represented Champakam Dorairajan in the State of Madras v. Champakam Dorairajan (AIR 1951 SC 226) which struck down the Communal G.O of Madras state which provided community-wise distribution of admission to medical colleges since 1927.

== Role in Constituent Assembly ==
The main architect of the Indian Constitution, B.R. Ambedkar, who also chaired the constitution's drafting committee, credited Iyer's contribution: "There were in the drafting committee men bigger, better and more competent than myself such as my friend Sir Alladi Krishnaswamy Iyer." When the Constituent Assembly adopted the principle of universal adult franchise, Iyer, a member, remarked that this was done, "with an abundant faith in the common man and the ultimate success of democratic rule, and in the full belief that the introduction of democratic government on the basis of adult suffrage will bring enlightenment and promote the well-being, the standard of life, the comfort, and the decent living of the common man".^{[5]} He was a part of nine committees including the Drafting and Advisory Committees. In the Constituent Assembly he defended suspension of certain political rights in circumstances of national crisis.

== Alladi Memorial Trust ==
Alladi Memorial Trust was founded in 1983 by Alladi Kuppuswami to commemorate the birth centenary of his father Alladi Krishnaswamy Iyer. It is aimed to help poor litigants, lawyers and students of law and for helping in the administration of justice. Alladi Memorial Lectures are delivered every year on issues relating to the Indian Constitution. The lecturers included V. R. Krishna Iyer, Y. V. Chandrachud, P. C. Rao, Pavani Parameswara Rao, Nandita Haksar, Rama Devi and M. Jagannadha Rao.

== Personal life ==
He was married to Venkalakshmamma (died 5 January 1956). Alladi Ramakrishnan, an Indian physicist and the founder of the Institute of Mathematical Sciences, Chennai was his son. Neuroscientist Vilayanur S. Ramachandran is his grandson.
