= N. D. Krishna Rao =

Chief Justice of Andhra Pradesh High Court

Chief Justice of Andhra Pradesh High Court
- In office 8 July 1966 – 19 July 1966
- Preceded by: Manohar Pershad
- Succeeded by: P. Jagan Mohan Reddy

Judge of Andhra Pradesh High Court
- In office 21 February 1955 – 8 July 1966

Personal details
- Born: 19 July 1904
- Died: 21 February 1971 (aged 66)

Justice N. D. Krishna Rao (19 July 1904 – 21 February 1971) was an Indian judge who briefly served as Chief Justice of Andhra Pradesh High Court.

== Early life ==
He was born on 19 July 1904. He was educated at Elementary School, Manjeshwar, Christian High School, Udipi, Ganapathy Secondary School, Mangalore, Government College, Mangalore Presidency College, Madras, School of Economics London and Brasenose College, Oxford.

== Career ==
He has joined the Indian Civil Service on 28 September 1928. He has served in Madras State till the formation of Andhra State, as Assistant and Sub-collector from 22 November 1928 to 18 July 1935. He was District Munsif from 19 July 1935 to 18 January 1937. District Judge and Sub-collector from 23 January 1937 to 13 June 1937; District Judge and Collector from 14 June 1937 to 20 October 1940. He was District Judge from 31 October 1940 to 20 February 1955. He was confirmed as District Judge, Grade-II on 18 June 1941 and as District Judge, Grade-I from May 1952.

He was appointed Judge of Andhra High Court on 21 February 1955. He was appointed Chief Justice of Andhra Pradesh High Court on 8 July 1966, ten days before his scheduled retirement, for political reasons, and duly retired on 19 July 1966.

== Death and legacy ==
He died on 21 February 1971. A legal lecture is named in his honor.

== See also ==
- Constitution of India
- Forced retirement
