= Sundaram Nainar Sundaram =

Indian judge (1932–2001))

Hon'ble Chief Justice Sundaram Nainar Sundaram

Chairman of Tamil Nadu Human Rights Commission
- In office 17 April 1997 – September 2001
- Appointed by: M. Fathima Beevi
- Preceded by: Office established
- Succeeded by: A. S. V. Moorthy

22nd Chief Justice of Andhra Pradesh High Court
- In office 14 December 1993 – 2 August 1994
- Nominated by: M. N. Venkatachaliah
- Appointed by: S. D. Sharma
- Preceded by: S. B. Majumdar; A. Lakshman Rao (acting)
- Succeeded by: S. Saghir Ahmad; A. Lakshman Rao (acting)

12th Chief Justice of Gujarat High Court
- In office 15 June 1992 – 13 December 1993
- Nominated by: M. H. Kania
- Appointed by: R. Venkataraman
- Preceded by: G. N. Ray; R. C. Mankad (acting); S. B. Majmudar (acting)
- Succeeded by: B. N. Kirpal

Judge of Madras High Court
- In office 4 January 1978 – 14 June 1992
- Nominated by: M. H. Beg
- Appointed by: Fakhruddin Ali Ahmed
- Acting Chief Justice
- In office 18 November 1991 – 14 June 1992
- Appointed by: R. Venkataraman
- Preceded by: Adarsh Sein Anand
- Succeeded by: Kanta Kumari Bhatnagar

Personal details
- Born: 3 August 1932 Tirunelveli, Tamil Nadu
- Died: September 2001 (aged 69)
- Education: Loyola College, Chennai, Madras Law College (LL.B)

Sundaram Nainar Sundaram (3 August 1932 – September 2001) was an Indian jurist who served as Chief Justice of the Gujarat High Court and the Andhra Pradesh High Court. He also served as judge and acting chief justice of Madras High Court.

== Education ==
Sundaram was born in Tirunelveli, Tamil Nadu, and was the son of Herbert Sundaram, a former District and Sessions Judge. He received his education at Board High School, Udumalaipettai, Anderson High School, Kanchipuram, and P. S. Higher Secondary School, Mylapore, Madras. He graduated in Commerce from Loyola College, Madras, and obtained his law degree from Madras Law College. In 1955, he enrolled as an advocate at the Madras High Court and practised in civil and criminal law. He also worked under Justice T. Ramaprasad Rao and assisted Special Public Prosecutor N. Krishnaswami Reddi.

== Career ==
Sundaram was appointed an Additional Judge of the Madras High Court on 4 January 1978 and became a permanent judge on 25 January 1979. He also served as Acting Chief Justice of Madras High Court from November 1991, due to elevation Chief Justice Adarsh Sein Anand to Supreme Court of India, until his own elevation as Chief Justice of the Gujarat High Court on 15 June 1992. He held this position until 13 December 1993. He subsequently became Chief Justice of the Andhra Pradesh High Court in December 1993.

After his judicial career, Sundaram served as the first Chairperson of the Tamil Nadu State Human Rights Commission.
