= Manohar Pershad =

Chief Justice of Andhra Pradesh High Court
- In office 20 October 1965 – 8 July 1966
- Preceded by: P. Satyanarayana Raju
- Succeeded by: N. D. Krishna Rao

Personal details
- Born: 8 July 1904

Justice Manohar Pershad (born 8 July 1904, date of death unknown) was an Indian judge who served as Chief Justice of Andhra Pradesh High Court in 1965-1966.

He was born on 8 July 1904 and educated at Mufeed-ul-Inam School, Hyderabad, Government High School, Surat and Broach, St. Vincent High School, Poona, Deccan College, Poona and Law College, Bombay. He enrolled as a High Court Vakil on 22 December 1927 and as Advocate in 1941. He has done original, appellate, civil and criminal work at the Bar. He was appointed judge of the former Hyderabad High Court on 20 November 1946. He was appointed judge of the High Court of Andhra Pradesh on reorganisation of States w.e.f. 1 November 1956. He was appointed Chief Justice of Andhra Pradesh High Court on 20 October 1965. He retired on 8 July 1966.

== Manohar Pershad Commission ==
The Government of Andhra Pradesh appointed Pershad chairman of the Backward Classes Commission on 12 April 1968. The report was submitted on 20 June 1970. It recommended 30 percent reservation in government services and educational institutions to backward castes.
