= Prabha Shankar Mishra =

Indian judge (1936-2012)

Chief Justice of Calcutta High Court
- In office 1997–1998
- Preceded by: V. N. Khare
- Succeeded by: Ashok Kumar Mathur

Chief Justice of Andhra Pradesh High Court
- In office 1995–1997
- Preceded by: Saiyed Sagir Ahmed
- Succeeded by: Umesh Chandra Banerjee

Judge of Madras High Court
- In office 1990–1995

Judge of Patna High Court
- In office 1982–1990

Personal details
- Born: 6 August 1936
- Died: 1 July 2012 (aged 75)
- Education: Patna University

Prabha Shankar Mishra (6 August 1936 – 1 July 2012) or P.S. Mishra was an Indian judge and the Chief Justice of the Calcutta and Andhra Pradesh High Court.

== Career ==
Mishra passed M.Sc. and LL.B. from Patna University and got the enrollment in 1960. He started practice in the Patna High Court and in 1982 he was appointed a Judge of the Patna High Court. Justice Mishra was transferred to the Madras High Court in 1990, thereafter appointed the Chief Justice of the Andhra Pradesh High Court in 1995. in 1997 he became the Chief Justice of the Calcutta High Court. A few weeks before retirement, Justice Mishra submitted his resignation on 5 July 1998 in protest of appointments to the Supreme Court. He criticised the way judges were appointed to highest court of India. After the resignation he started practice in the Supreme Court of India as a senior advocate. He died in 2012 at the age of 76.
