= K. Jayachandra Reddy =

Indian judge (1929–2020)

Judge of Supreme Court of India
- In office 1990–1995

Chairman, 14th Law Commission of India
- In office 1995–1997

Chairman, Press Council of India
- In office 8 August 2001 – 7 February 2005

Personal details
- Born: 15 July 1929 Cuddapah district, Andhra Pradesh
- Died: 9 February 2020 (aged 90)
- Spouse: Sarojini Devi

K. Jayachandra Reddy (15 July 1929 – 9 February 2020) was a judge of the Supreme Court of India.

== Early life ==
Reddy was born in Rayachoti, Cuddapah District, Andhra Pradesh. He received a high school education at the Theosophical High School at Madanapalli and Board High School at Rayachoti. He attended Government College at Anantapur, and Besant Theosophical College at Madanapalli. He earned a B.L. degree at Madras Law College in 1951.

== Career ==
Jayachandra Reddy enrolled as an Advocate of Madras High Court on 4 August 1952, where he practiced mainly in criminal and constitutional law. He joined the office of Sri P. Basireddy, who later retired as Acting Chief Justice of Andhra Pradesh High Court.

He moved to Hyderabad on 1 November 1956 after formation of Andhra Pradesh. He was then appointed as Additional Public Prosecutor of the Andhra Pradesh High Court in 1965 and as Principal Public Prosecutor of the High Court in 1970.

Reddy was elevated to the Bench of the A.P. High Court on 7 March 1975, where he was appointed as an Additional Judge of the High Court of Andhra Pradesh for a period of two years. He was Chairman of the A.P. State Legal Aid Board, Chairman of the Rules Committee of the High Court, and Chairman of the Advisory Board. He was then appointed as permanent Judge of A.P. High Court with effect from 30 June 1976.

=== Supreme court ===
Justice Reddy was elevated to the Supreme Court Bench on 11 January 1990. He retired on 15 July 1994 but was sworn in again as Ad hoc Judge for one more year. He was chairman of the National Law Commission from July 1995 to August 1997.

Justice Reddy was appointed by the United Nations in 1999 as a Member of the Expert Group, to review the effective operation and functioning of the International Criminal Tribunals for the former Yugoslavia and for Rwanda. The Expert Group, apart from Reddy, consisted of a Supreme Court Judge from Argentina, a Supreme Court Judge from Gambia, the then President of the United Nations Administrative Tribunal and a former Under-secretary General of the U.N. The Report submitted was considered by the U.N. General Assembly.

After leaving the Supreme Court, Reddy was given the National Law Day Award in 1996 by the Indian Council of Jurists, the Chairman of which was Justice P. N. Bhagwati and the Award was presented by the then Prime Minister. In 1994, he was given the Rajiv Gandhi Excellence Award for his excellent services rendered in the legal field. It was presented by the Speaker of the Parliament.

Justice Reddy was Chairman of the Press Council of India from 8 August 2001 to 7 February 2005.

He died in February 2020 at the age of 90.
