= Penmetsa Satyanarayana Raju =

Hon.ble Justice P. Satyanarayana Raju

Judge of Supreme Court of India
- In office 20 October 1965 – 20 April 1966
- Nominated by: P. B. Gajendragadkar
- Appointed by: S. Radhakrishnan

3rd Chief Justice of Andhra Pradesh High Court
- In office 30 December 1964 – 19 October 1965
- Nominated by: B. P. Sinha
- Appointed by: S. Radhakrishnan
- Preceded by: P. Chandra Reddy
- Succeeded by: Manohar Pershad

Judge of Andhra Pradesh High Court
- In office 1 November 1956 – 29 December 1964; Acting CJ : 23 November 1964 - 29 December 1964
- Appointed by: Rajendra Prasad

Judge of Andhra High Court
- In office 1 November 1954 – 31 October 1956
- Appointed by: Rajendra Prasad

Personal details
- Born: 17 August 1908 Ajjaram, Tanuku, West Godavari, India
- Died: 20 April 1966 (aged 57) New Delhi, India
- Education: B.A. and LL.B
- Alma mater: Maharajah's College; Madras Law College

Penmetsa Satyanarayana Raju B.A., B.L. (17 August 1908 – 20 April 1966) was an Indian Supreme Court judge and Chief Justice of Andhra Pradesh High Court.

== Early life and career ==
He was born on 17 August 1908 at Ajjaram village in Tanuku taluk in West Godavari district of Andhra Pradesh, India. His parents were P. Ramabhadra Raju and Subhadramma. He was their eldest son and had two brothers and sisters.

He was educated at Board High School, Tanuku, West Godavari District and Intermediate in Vizianagaram. He did graduation Bachelor of Arts (B.A.) from Maharajah's College, Vizianagaram. He did Bachelor of Law (B.L.) Degree from Madras Law College and joined the Madras Bar in 1930. He was associated with late Sri T. Prakasam for 3 years and later with Sri P. Satyanarayana Rao. He became the Government Pleader of the Composite state of Madras in 1950 and State Counsel in 1951. When Andhra State was formed he became the Government Pleader of Andhra State in 1953.

He has visited Russia in 1964-65 along with the Chief Justice of India P. B. Gajendragadkar to study their legal system.

He was appointed judge of the Supreme Court of India on 20 October 1965. He died in harness on 20 April 1966 in New Delhi.
