= Gopal Rao Ekbote =

Indian politician

Chief Justice of Andhra Pradesh High Court
- In office 1972–1974
- Preceded by: K.V.L.Narasimham
- Succeeded by: S. Obul Reddi

Personal details
- Born: 1 June 1912
- Died: 4 June 1994 (aged 82)

Justice Gopal Rao Ekbote (1 June 1912 - 4 June 1994) was a retired Indian judge and a former Chief Justice of Andhra Pradesh High Court.

== Early life and education ==
He was born on 1 June 1912. He was educated at the Osmania University.

== Career ==
In the 1952 elections, he was elected Member of the Legislative Assembly from Chaderghat.

He was appointed Additional Judge of the Andhra Pradesh High Court for a period of two years with effect from 7 June 1962 and Permanent Judge from 12 February 1964. He was appointed Chief Justice of A.P. with effect from 1 April 1972 and retired on 1 June 1974.
