= A. R. Lakshmanan =

Indian judge (1942–2020)

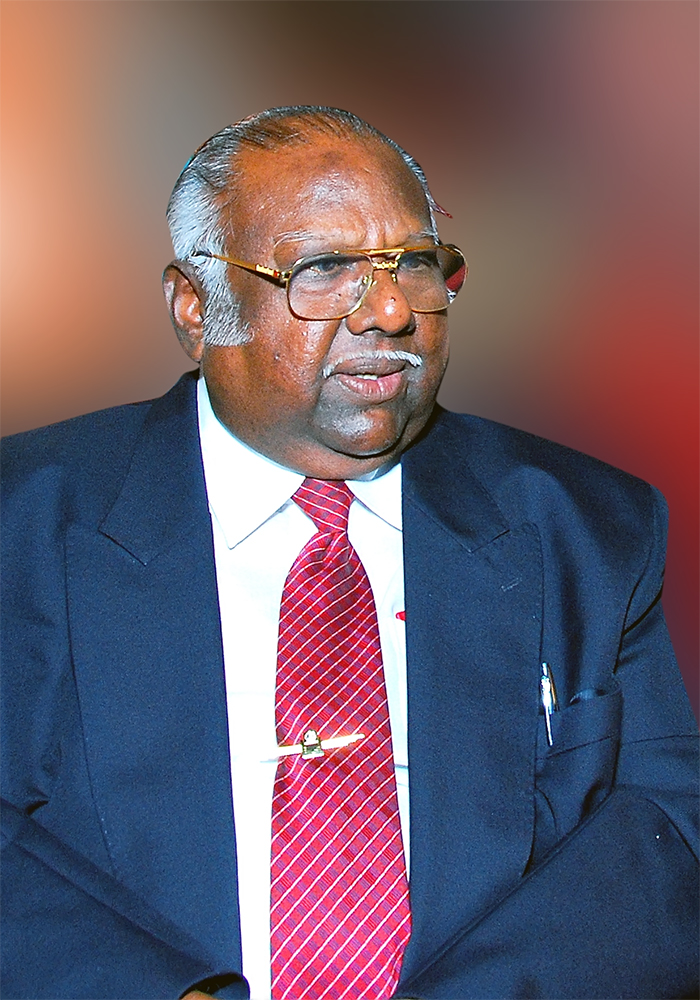

Judge of the Supreme Court of India
- In office 20 December 2002 – 22 March 2007

Chairman of the 18th Law Commission of India
- In office 2006–2009

Personal details
- Born: 22 March 1942 India
- Died: 27 August 2020 (aged 78)
- Cause of death: Cardiac arrest
- Resting place: Devakottai, Sivagangai District, Tamilnadu.
- Spouse: Meenakshi Achy
- Children: 4 Children L. Arunachalam AL. Umayal S. Kamala AR. L. Sundaresan

Arunachalam R. Lakshmanan (22 March 1942 – 27 August 2020) was a judge of the Supreme Court of India.

He studied in Chennai. Before his elevation to the Supreme Court in 2002, he served as a judge on the Madras High Court and Kerala High Court. He was also appointed Chief Justice of Rajasthan High Court in 2000 and Andhra Pradesh High Court in 2001. He retired in 2007.

He hailed from the Nagarathar community and was born in Devakottai, Tamil Nadu. He served as chairman of the Law Commission of India during 2006–2009. Lakshmanan was representing Tamil Nadu in the Mullai Periyar Panel appointed by the Hon'ble Supreme Court of India. The panel is headed by Justice A.S. Anand.

He died in August 2020 from COVID-19, two days after his wife died from the virus.
