= Avula Sambasiva Rao =

Judge of Andhra Pradesh High Court
- In office 1967–76

Vice-Chancellor of Andhra University
- In office 1980–83

Personal details
- Born: 16 March 1917
- Died: 27 July 2003 (aged 86)

Justice Avula Sambasiva Rao (16 March 1917 in Mulpuru, Guntur district – 27 July 2003) was an Indian judge who served as a Chief Justice of Andhra Pradesh, Lok Ayukta, and Vice-chancellor of Andhra University.

Rao was educated at Guntur, Madras and Calcutta and was an Arts and Law graduate from Madras University. Enrolled as an Advocate in Madras High Court on 7 April 1941, he practised in that Court as well as in High Court of Andhra Pradesh at Guntur and at Hyderabad until 21 April 1967. On 14 July 1966, he was appointed the 2nd Government Pleader of Andhra Pradesh.

Rao was appointed permanent judge of the Andhra Pradesh High Court on 22 April 1967. He acted as Chief Justice of High Court of Andhra Pradesh from 25 January 1975 to 10 January 1976.

Appointed permanent Chief Justice on 9 April 1978, Rao retired on 16 March 1979. He was also Vice-Chancellor of Andhra University, Waltair.
