= Manmohan Singh Liberhan =

Indian judge (1938–2026)

Manmohan Singh Liberhan (11 November 1938 – 2 August 2026) was an Indian jurist who was the Chief Justice of the Andhra Pradesh High Court, and previously of the Madras High Court. For 17 years he headed the Liberhan Ayodhya Commission of Inquiry, which prepared a report on the Babri Mosque demolition.

== Life and career ==
Liberhan was at one time the advocate general for the State of Haryana. He was soon thereafter elevated as a permanent judge of the Punjab and Haryana High Court. He was appointed the chairman of the Liberhan Ayodhya Commission of Inquiry by the then Prime Minister, PV Narasimha Rao. According to the commission, the events of 6 December 1992 in Ayodhya that culminated in the razing of the Babri Mosque were "neither spontaneous nor unplanned".

He was subsequently transferred to the Madras High Court as Chief Justice of that court. Shortly thereafter, he was transferred to the Andhra Pradesh High Court from where he retired.

Liberhan continued to hold his position as the chairman of the Liberhan Commission till 2009.

Liberhan died on 2 August 2026, at the age of 87.

== See also ==
- Liberhan Commission
