= M. Jagannadha Rao =

Indian judge (1935–2024)

Hon'ble Justice (Retd.) Mamidanna Jagannadha Rao

Chairman, 17th Law Commission of India
- In office 2003–2006
- Appointed by: A. P. J. Abdul Kalam
- Prime Minister: Atal Bihari Vajpayee

Judge of Supreme Court of India
- In office 21 March 1997 – 1 December 2000
- Nominated by: A. M. Ahmadi
- Appointed by: Shankar Dayal Sharma

17th Chief Justice of Delhi High Court
- In office 12 April 1994 – 20 March 1997
- Nominated by: M. N. Venkatachaliah
- Appointed by: Shankar Dayal Sharma
- Preceded by: Gokal Chand Mittal
- Succeeded by: Ajay Prakash Misra

13th Chief Justice of Kerala High Court
- In office 8 August 1991 – 11 April 1994
- Nominated by: Ranganath Misra
- Appointed by: R. Venkataraman
- Preceded by: V. S. Malimath
- Succeeded by: Sujata Manohar

Judge of Andhra Pradesh High Court
- In office 29 September 1982 – 7 August 1991
- Nominated by: Y. V. Chandrachud
- Appointed by: R. Venkataraman

Personal details
- Born: 2 December 1935 Rajahmundry, Madras Province, British India
- Died: 25 November 2024 (aged 88)
- Children: M. S. Ramachandra Rao

M. Jagannadha Rao (2 December 1935 – 25 November 2024) was a judge of the Supreme Court of India and previously Chief Justice of Kerala High Court and Delhi High Court.

== Life and career ==
Rao was born in Rajahmundry, Andhra Pradesh on 2 December 1935. He passed B.Sc. (Hons.) from Presidency College, Madras and L.L.B. from Osmania University.

Rao enrolled as an advocate in 1960, and practiced on the High Court of Andhra Pradesh for 22 years. He worked with his father, Justice M. S. Ramachandra Rao, and later with his paternal uncle, Justice M. Krishna Rao.

He was appointed Additional Judge of High Court of Andhra Pradesh on 29 September 1982 and Permanent Judge on 29 November 1982. Rao was appointed Chief Justice of Kerala High Court in August 1991, Chief Justice of Delhi High Court in March 1994 and Judge of Supreme Court of India on 23 March 1997.

Rao retired as Judge of Supreme Court of India on 2 December 2000. His son Justice M. S. Ramachandra Rao is currently a Judge of the Andhra Pradesh High Court.

He was vice-chairman and chairman of the Sixteenth Law Commission of India from 2001 to 2003 and Chairman of the Seventeenth Law Commission of India from 2003 to 2006. He has submitted about 26 Reports, starting from 176th Report to the 201st Report, on a variety of legal issues of contemporary relevance.

He was a member of the Academic Councils of the National Law University, Bangalore and Jodhpur, Indian Law Institute, New Delhi and Chairman of the Academic Council, Army Institute of Law, Chandigarh.

Rao died on 25 November 2024, at the age of 88.
