= List of alumni of Scottish Church College =

This list contains notable alumni of Scottish Church College, an undergraduate and postgraduate college affiliated with the University of Calcutta, India.

== Social reformers and religious leaders ==
- Rev. Lal Behari Dey, theologian of the Free Church of Scotland
- Mohanananda Brahmachari, a monk and religious leader
- Swami Gambhirananda, former president of the Ramakrishna Mission
- Krishna Kumar Mitra, former president of the Sadharan Brahmo Samaj
- Rev. Aurobindo Nath Mukherjee, first Indian to serve as the bishop of Calcutta and as the Metropolitan bishop of India within the Church of India, Pakistan, Burma and Ceylon
- A.C. Bhaktivedanta Swami Prabhupada, proponent of Gaudiya Vaishnavism and founder of the International Society for Krishna Consciousness
- Sitanath Tattwabhushan, theologian and former president of the Sadharan Brahmo Samaj
- Brahmabandhav Upadhyay, theologian and preacher of New Dispensation Brahmoism, Protestantism, and Roman Catholicism
- Swami Vivekananda, Monk, philosopher, social reformer and founder of the Ramakrishna Mission
- Paramahansa Yogananda, proponent of Kriya Yoga in the West and founder of the Self-Realization Fellowship

== Independence activists and politicians ==
- Gopinath Bordoloi, prominent freedom fighter, first chief minister of Assam
- Subhas Chandra Bose, former president of the Indian National Congress, founder president of the All India Forward Bloc, co-founder of the Indian National Army and head of state, Provisional Government of Free India
- Birendra Narayan Chakraborty, former governor of Haryana
- Amarendranath Chatterjee, revolutionary associated with Anushilan Samiti, and Jugantar
- Nirmal Chandra Chatterjee, former president of the All India Hindu Mahasabha
- Saroj Dutta, veteran communist leader, co-founder of the Communist Party of India (Marxist–Leninist) and the Naxalite movement
- Fazle Haque, West Bengal state minister
- S.C. Jamir, former chief minister of Nagaland, former governor of Maharashtra, Gujarat and Goa, and governor of Odisha
- Banwari Lal Joshi, former governor of Uttar Pradesh, Delhi, Meghalaya and Uttarakhand
- Rishang Keishing, former chief minister of Manipur
- Shawkat Ali Khan, a framer of the Constitution of Bangladesh
- Bishweshwar Prasad Koirala, first democratically elected prime minister of Nepal
- Brington Buhai Lyngdoh, former chief minister of Meghalaya
- S.C. Marak, former chief minister of Meghalaya
- Ambica Charan Mazumdar, former president of the Indian National Congress
- Ajit Kumar Panja, former minister of state for external affairs
- Prafulla Chandra Sen, former chief minister of West Bengal
- Yangmasho Shaiza, former chief minister of Manipur
- George Gilbert Swell, former deputy speaker of the Lok Sabha and former ambassador to Norway and Burma

== Jurists ==
- Sir Gooroodas Banerjee, former judge at the Calcutta High Court
- Sambhunath Banerjee, former judge of the Calcutta High Court
- Umesh Chandra Banerjee, former chief justice of the Andhra Pradesh High Court and former judge of the Supreme Court of India
- Anandamoy Bhattacharjee, former chief justice of the Sikkim, Calcutta and the Bombay High Courts
- Sudhi Ranjan Das, former Chief Justice of India
- Samarendra Chandra Deb, former chief justice of the Calcutta High Court
- Mukul Gopal Mukherjee, former chief justice of the Rajasthan High Court
- Ganendra Narayan Ray, former chief justice of the Gujarat High Court, and former judge of the Supreme Court of India
- Subimal Chandra Roy, former judge of the Supreme Court of India
- Amal Kumar Sarkar, former Chief Justice of India
- Amarendra Nath Sen, former chief justice of the Calcutta High Court, and former judge of the Supreme Court of India
- Anil Kumar Sen, former chief justice of the Calcutta High Court
- Shyamal Kumar Sen, former chief justice of the Allahabad High Court, and former governor of West Bengal

== Scholars and academic administrators ==
- Sir Gooroodas Banerjee, first Indian vice chancellor of the University of Calcutta
- Sambhunath Banerjee, Nirmal Kumar Sidhanta, Ramendra Kumar Podder, and Santosh Bhattacharyya, former vice chancellors of the University of Calcutta
- Chandramukhi Basu, one of the first female graduates of the British Empire, and the first female head of an undergraduate college in South Asia (as principal of Bethune College, Calcutta)
- Nirmal Kumar Bose, eminent anthropologist and freedom fighter
- Ramaprasad Chanda, anthropologist and archaeologist
- Animesh Chakravorty, recipient of the Shanti Swarup Bhatnagar Prize for Science and Technology in chemistry, formerly chair of the department of chemistry, Indian Institute of Technology Kanpur
- Asima Chatterjee, first Indian woman to earn a doctorate in science, first female recipient of the Shanti Swarup Bhatnagar Prize for Science and Technology, and first female president of the Indian Science Congress
- Tarak Nath Das, formerly professor of political science at Columbia University
- Sir Jnan Chandra Ghosh, formerly director of the Indian Institute of Science, Bangalore, founder-director of the Indian Institute of Technology Kharagpur and former vice chancellor of the University of Calcutta
- Pabitra Kumar Giri, an urban economist
- Biraja Sankar Guha, pioneering anthropologist, one of the first PhD recipients in anthropology in the world (Harvard University, 1924) and founder-director of the Anthropological Survey of India
- Rabindra Kumar Das Gupta, formerly Tagore professor of Bengali literature, University of Delhi, and former director of the National Library of India
- Kalidas Nag, historian, author and parliamentarian
- Hem Chandra Raychaudhuri, formerly Carmichael Professor of Ancient Indian History and Culture, University of Calcutta
- Tapan Raychaudhuri, ad hominem professor of Indian history and civilization and emeritus fellow, St Antony's College, Oxford
- Purabi Roy, noted scholar, author and Netaji researcher
- Sarat Chandra Roy, pioneering anthropologist, often regarded as the father of Indian ethnography, and as the first Indian anthropologist
- Nityananda Saha, former vice chancellor of the University of Kalyani
- Sir Brajendra Nath Seal, first chancellor of Visva-Bharati University, former vice chancellor of the University of Mysore
- Kaliprasanna Vidyaratna, Sanskrit scholar, author and academician

== Performing arts, theater and cinema ==
- Pulak Bandyopadhyay, lyricist and composer
- Puja Banerjee, actress
- Birendra Krishna Bhadra, broadcaster, playwright, and theater director
- Sisir Bhaduri, noted playwright
- Utpalendu Chakrabarty, film director and thespian
- Mithun Chakraborty, Bollywood and Bengali film actor and social activist
- Tridha Choudhury, actress
- Partha Pratim Chowdhury, film director and playwright
- Buddhadeb Dasgupta, noted parallel cinema director and poet
- Manna Dey, Bollywood and Bengali film music exponent
- Shyamanand Jalan, thespian and theatre director
- Sailajaranjan Majumdar, distinguished exponent and teacher of Rabindrasangeet
- Silajit Majumder, singer and actor
- Tarun Majumdar, film director
- Manoj Mitra, dramatist
- Suchitra Mitra, Rabindra Sangeet exponent
- Pankaj Mullick, Bollywood and Bengali cinema music director and composer
- Biman Mukhopadhyay, Bengali singer
- Anamika Saha, actress
- Kaushik Sen, noted theatre personality, director of Swapnasandhani theatre group
- Mrinal Sen, internationally acclaimed art film director and cultural commentator
- Rudraprasad Sengupta, eminent theatre personality, director of Nandikar theatre group and cultural critic
- Madhav Sharma, actor, comedian, theater director
- Badal Sircar, dramatist

== Writers, poets and journalists ==
- Farrukh Ahmed, poet, writer, activist of the Language Movement
- Dipendranath Bandyopadhyay, author
- Parvati Prasad Baruwa, litterateur
- Lakshminath Bezbaroa, writer, editor and social critic
- Bani Basu, essayist, novelist, and poet
- Ajit Kumar Chakravarty, translator and critic
- Sanjib Chattopadhyay, journalist, author and critic
- Nirad C. Chaudhuri, polymath, historian and commentator on culture, and Commander of the Order of the British Empire
- Sajanikanta Das, critic, poet and editor of Shanibarer Chithi
- Satyendranath Dutta, poet
- Sudhindranath Dutta, author and poet
- Pracheta Gupta, writer
- Samaresh Majumdar, novelist
- Tilottama Majumdar, Bangali novelist, short story writer, poet, lyricist, and essayist
- Mustafa Manwar, artist and media personality
- Premendra Mitra, novelist, short story and science fiction writer, and film director
- Dhan Gopal Mukerji, socio-cultural critic and first successful Indian man of letters in the United States of America; winner of Newbery Medal (1928)
- Subhas Mukhopadhyay, poet
- Derek O'Brien, quiz-master and author
- Madhu Rye, playwright, novelist and short story writer
- Kali Nath Roy, editor in chief of The Tribune magazine
- Ashok Kumar Sarkar, former editor of Desh literary magazine and editor-in-chief of the Anandabazar Patrika (1958–1983)
- Kanhaiyalal Sethia, poet

== Administrators and organization leaders ==
- Mani Lal Bhaumik, scientist (laser technology) turned entrepreneur, inventor of the excimer laser and author
- Jagmohan Dalmiya, former president of the Board of Control for Cricket in India and the first Indian chairman of the International Cricket Council
- Nitish Chandra Laharry, first Indian (and Asian) president of Rotary International (1962–63)
- Diptendu Pramanick, first secretary of the Eastern India Motion Pictures Association, and secretary of the Film Federation of India (1953–54)
- Binay Ranjan Sen, former director general of the Food and Agriculture Organization (1956–1967)
- Evelyn Norah Shullai, pioneer of the Girl Guides Movement in India

== Sportspersons ==
- Sreerupa Bose, former member, India national women's cricket team
- Surya Shekhar Ganguly, chess grandmaster and national champion
- Gourgopal Ghosh, football player for the Mohun Bagan club and mathematician
- Dharma Bhakta Mathema, bodybuilder, political activist and anti-royalist martyr in the Kingdom of Nepal

== Industrialists and businessmen ==
- Samson H Chowdhury, an industrialist
- Rameshwarlall Daulatram Nopany, founder of Nopany group based in Calcutta and a philanthropist
