= Department of Law, University of Calcutta =

Department of Law

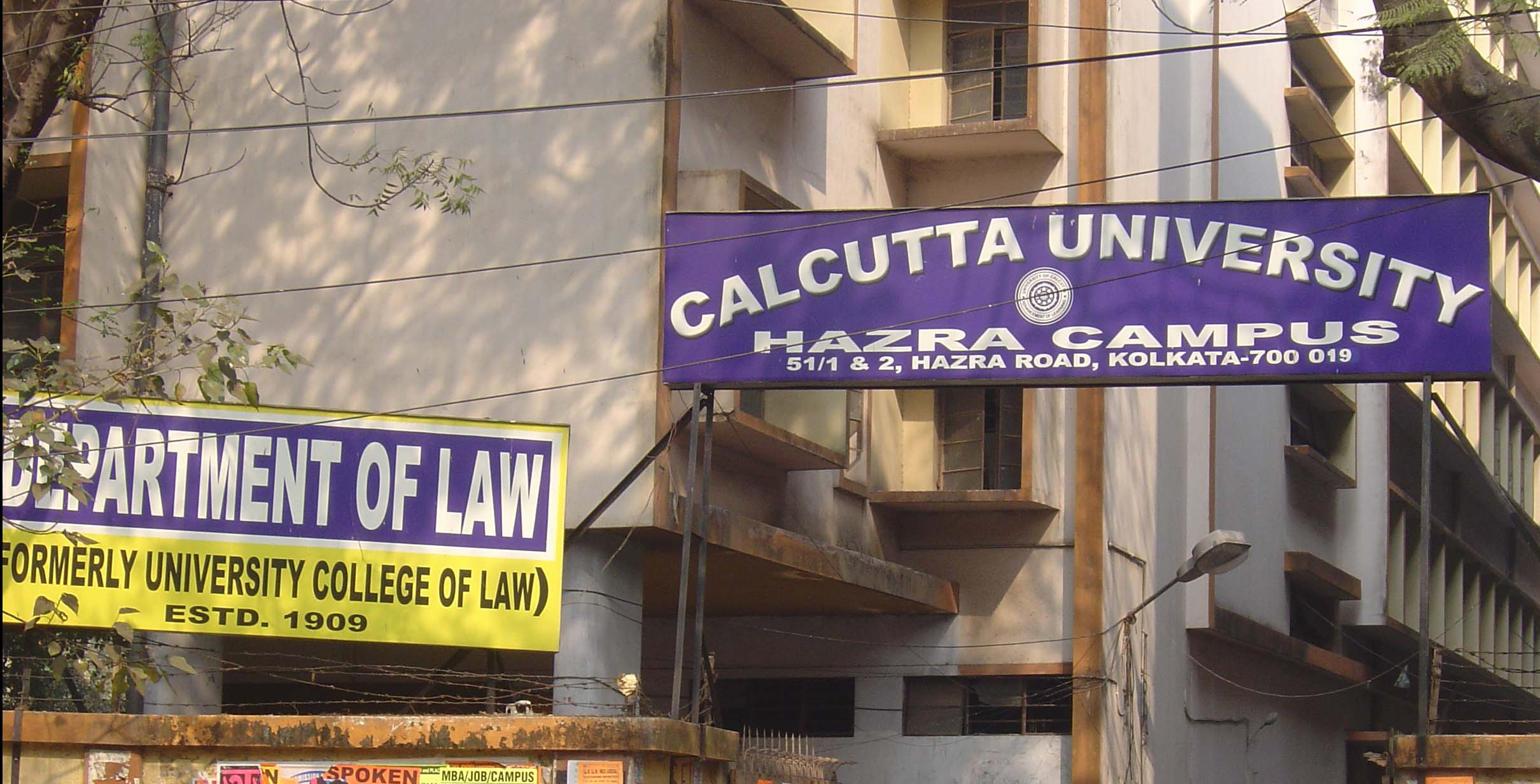
- Motto: Advancement of Learning
- Type: Public
- Established: January 1909; 117 years ago
- Parent institution: University of Calcutta
- Affiliations: UGC, BCI
- Dean: Dr. Manirani Dasgupta
- Academic staff: 40
- Students: 600 (undergraduate); 84 (postgraduate)
- Location: Kolkata, West Bengal, India; 22°31′33″N 88°21′47″E
- Campus: Urban
- Colors: White; Sky Blue
- Website: caluniv.ac.in/academic/law

The Department of Law, University of Calcutta, Kolkata, West Bengal, formerly University College of Law, is a faculty in the University of Calcutta, founded in 1909, colloquially referred to as Hazra Law College, which offers undergraduate, postgraduate, doctorate and post doctorate courses. The Faculty oversees fifteen affiliated Law schools of the University.

== History ==
The college was established by the then Vice Chancellor of University of Calcutta Ashutosh Mukherjee in 1909. Prior to 1983, the Department of Law was known as the University College of Law. Sir Asutosh wanted it to be a model center of legal education. In a meeting held on 4 July 1908, the Senate recommended the proposal to establish University Law College in Kolkata. Sir Surendranath Banerjee and Babu Mahendranath Ray were also present at the meeting, which was presided by Andrew Henderson Leith Fraser, the Rector of the University. The resolution was passed that a college is to be established for the promotion of legal education of the students of Bengal for degrees in law and to serve as a model college. Finally the University Law College, started functioning under the management of a government body consisting of 16 members with the Vice-Chancellor as President from July, 1909. Sir Ashutosh Mukherjee himself was made the first Dean of the Faculty of Law, who was followed by another eminent lawyer, Babu Mahendranath Ray in 1924, who took over after the latter's death. Eminent scholar and jurist Dr. S.C. Bagchi, LL.D became the first principal and Birajmohan Majumdar was appointed the first vice-principal of this College. The Faculty has been in its current state since 1983.

== Courses ==
The department offers a five-year integrated B.A LL.B.(Hons.) program. Admission to the department's undergraduate program as well as its affiliated colleges is done on the basis of a Common Admission Test which is taken by upwards of 5,000 students every year. The department also offers a two-year Master of law (LL.M), a PhD programme and also provides postdoctoral research (LL.D).

== Notable alumni ==
The services of the Department to the University and the country are not always realized. The Department of Law has been, during the course of its existence for over a century, a nursery of leaders of the State, Bar and the Judiciary.

=== Presidents ===
- Rajendra Prasad - First President of India
- Pranab Mukherjee - 13th President of India
- Abdus Sattar - President of Bangladesh and Interior Minister of Pakistan
- Abu Sadat Mohammad Sayem - First Chief Justice of Bangladesh and President of Bangladesh
- Fazlul Qadir Chaudhry - Acting President of Pakistan and Federal Minister

=== Prime Ministers ===
- A. K. Fazlul Huq - 1st Prime Minister of Bengal and Interior Minister of Pakistan
- B. P. Koirala - First democratically elected prime minister of Nepal
- Nurul Amin - 8th prime minister of Pakistan and 1st Vice President

=== Chief Justices ===
- Bijan Kumar Mukherjea - 4th Chief Justice of India
- Sudhi Ranjan Das - 5th Chief Justice of India
- Amal Kumar Sarkar - 8th Chief Justice of India
- Altamas Kabir - 39th Chief Justice of India
- Fazal Akbar - 6th Chief Justice of Pakistan
- Kemaluddin Hossain - 3rd Chief Justice of Bangladesh

=== Supreme Court Judges and other luminaries ===
- Dipankar Datta - sitting Judge of the Supreme court of India
- Joymalya Bagchi - sitting Judge of the Supreme court of India
- Pinaki Chandra Ghose - First Lokpal and Judge of the Supreme Court of India.
- Indira Banerjee - Former Judge in the Supreme Court of India
- Radhabinod Pal - International Jurist
- Asok Kumar Ganguly - Former Judge in the Supreme Court of India
- G.N. Ray - Former Judge in the Supreme Court of India
- Bankim Chandra Ray - Former Judge in the Supreme Court of India
- Ganendra Narayan Ray - Former Judge in the Supreme Court of India and chief justice of the Gujarat High Court
- Alak Chandra Gupta - Former Judge in the Supreme Court of India
- M. K. Mukherjee - Former Judge in the Supreme Court of India
- S.C. Sen - Former Judge in the Supreme Court of India
- Tarun Chatterjee - Former Judge in the Supreme Court of India
- N. L. Untwalia - Former Judge in the Supreme Court of India
- Amarendra Nath Sen - Judge in the Supreme Court of India and Chief Justice of the Calcutta High Court
- Ganendra Narayan Ray - Judge in the Supreme Court of India and Chief Justice of the Gujarat High Court

=== Chief Justices of High Courts ===
- Shyamal Kumar Sen - Chief Justice of Allahabad High Court and Governor of West Bengal
- Anandamoy Bhattacharjee - Chief Justice of the Calcutta High Court, (Acting) Sikkim High Court and the Bombay High Court
- Anil Kumar Sen - Chief Justice of the Calcutta High Court
- Sambhunath Banerjee - Chief Justice of the Calcutta High Court
- Sanjib Banerjee - Chief Justice of the Meghalaya High Court
- Biswanath Somadder - Chief Justice of Sikkim High Court
- Mukul Gopal Mukherjee - Chief Justice of the Rajasthan High Court.
- Samarendra Chandra Deb - Chief Justice of the Calcutta High Court
- Subhasis Talapatra - former acting Chief Justice of Tripura High Court
- Debasish Kar Gupta - Chief Justice of the Calcutta High Court

=== Attorneys General ===
- Rafique Ul Huq - Attorney General of Bangladesh
- Niren De - Attorney General of India

=== Politicians ===
- Siddhartha Shankar Ray - Lawyer, diplomat and former Chief Minister of West Bengal
- Mamata Banerjee - former Chief Minister of West Bengal
- Biman Banerjee - Speaker of the West Bengal Legislative Assembly
- Syama Prasad Mookerjee - Founder of the Bhartiya Jana Sangh and former Union Minister of Commerce and Industry
- Jogendra Nath Mandal - 1st Minister for Law and Justice (Pakistan)
- Azizul Haque - Viceroy's Executive Council member and Bengali Politician
- Nirmal Chandra Chatterjee - Indian jurist and Parliamentarian
- Amar Singh - Politician
- Asutosh Law - Lawyer and former Member of Parliament
- Tathagata Roy - Politician, former Governor of Meghalaya
- B. N. Banerjee - Parliamentarian
- Bhaskar Choudhury - Indian politician from Meghalaya
- Syed Abdul Mansur Habibullah - Politician
- Durga Charan Banerjee - Indian jurist and a member of parliament
- Gopinath Bordoloi - first Chief Minister of Assam
- Pratap Chandra Chunder - Former Minister of education and social welfare portfolio
- Azizul Haque - Bengali lawyer, writer, Politician and public servant
- Snehansu Kanta Acharya - Lawyer and Politician
- Kamal Basu - Politician, former Mayor of Kolkata
- Abhijit Gangopadhyay, judge of Calcutta High Court and Member of Parliament
- Maziruddin Ahmed (born 1898), Cooch Behar politician

=== Others ===
- Protik Prakash Banerjee - Former Calcutta High Court Judge
- Haridas Bhattacharya - Bengali Indian philosopher, author and educationist
- Soumitra Sen - former judge of the Calcutta High Court.
- Birinchi Kumar Barua - folklorist, scholar, novelist, playwright, historian, linguist, educationist, administrator
- Nares Chandra Sen-Gupta - Legal scholar and Bengali novelist
