= Vijaya Tahilramani =

Former Chief Justice of Madras High Court

Chief Justice of the Madras High Court
- In office 4 August 2018 – 6 September 2019
- Nominated by: Dipak Misra
- Appointed by: Ram Nath Kovind
- Preceded by: Indira Banerjee
- Succeeded by: Vineet Kothari (acting)

Chief Justice of the Bombay High Court
- Acting
- In office 5 December 2017 – 3 August 2018
- Nominated by: Dipak Misra
- Appointed by: Ram Nath Kovind

Personal details
- Born: 3 October 1958 (age 68) Bombay, Bombay State, India

Vijaya Kamlesh Tahilramani (born 3 October 1958) is a former Indian judge and prosecutor, who last served as the chief justice of the Madras High Court. Previously, as a judge of the Bombay High Court, she notably upheld the conviction of several persons for the rape of a pregnant Muslim woman during the 2002 Gujarat riots, chastising investigative authorities for their inaction in the matter, and also refused parole for those convicted in the 1993 Bombay bombings. She retired in 2019, after refusing to accept a controversial transfer from the Madras High Court to the Meghalaya High Court.

== Career ==
=== Judicial appointments and judgments ===
Tahilramani joined the Bar in 1982, enrolling with the Bar Council of Maharashtra and Goa. She practiced law in the Mumbai City Civil, Sessions, and High Court, working on criminal and civil matters, and also taught criminal law at K.C. Law College in Mumbai between 1987 and 1993. In 1990, she was appointed a government pleader and public prosecutor, initially serving in sessions courts and later in the Bombay High Court.

On 26 June 2001, Tahilramani was appointed a judge of the Bombay High Court, and in 2015, she briefly served as the acting chief justice of the Bombay High Court after Justice Mohit Shah retired. On 5 December 2017, she became acting chief justice for the Bombay High Court once again, succeeding Justice Manjula Chellur. During her tenure at the Bombay High Court, Tahilramani notably rejected appeals and affirmed the conviction of persons accused in the 2002 Bilkis Bano case, in which a 19 year old pregnant Muslim woman was gang-raped during the 2002 Gujarat riots. While granting compensation to the victim, Tahilramani's judgment also noted significant lapses by the police and investigative authorities in recording and investigating the crime. In 2018, Tahilramani also declined a request from Devendra Fadnavis, a member of the Bharatiya Janata Party and then the Chief Minister of Maharashtra, to head an inquiry into the 2018 Bhima Koregaon incident, on the grounds that as a sitting judge of the High Court, it would be inappropriate for her to accept the government appointment. She also refused to grant parole to persons convicted in the 1993 Bombay bombings.

On 12 August 2018, Tahilramani was appointed the chief justice of the Madras High Court, succeeding Justice Indira Banerjee. At the Madras High Court, Tahilramani introduced several administrative changes, including the rule that cases concerning contempt of court would be heard only by the judges assigned to hear contempt matters. Notably one such case in which she instructed contempt proceedings to continue was against H. Raja, national secretary of the Bharatiya Janata Party, who had made several allegations against judges of the court after he was denied permission to create a structure for religious worship in a public place.

=== Transfer, protests, and resignation ===
On 28 August 2019, Tahilramani was transferred from the Madras High Court to the Meghalaya High Court by the Supreme Court of India. On 3 September 2019, she requested the collegium to reconsider their decision, but was ordered to undertake the transfer on 6 September 2019. The Supreme Court publicly refused to assign any reasons for the transfer, stating that it was to secure the "better administration of justice." Tahilramani's objections to the transfer occurred at a time when several other High Court judges had also made similar objections to transfers, which were also rejected and became the subject of public protests. Tahilramani, who was due to retire in October 2020, consequently submitted her resignation, declining the transfer. At the time of her resignation, she was one of only two female chief justices in constitutional courts in India. Tahilramani's transfer was met with widespread protests, and the Madras High Court Advocates' Association announced that they would be boycotting court proceedings for one day to object. The president of the association stated that Tahilramani had been "unfairly demoted," describing the unexplained transfer from the larger, established Madras High Court, consisting of 75 judges, to the newer and smaller 3-judge Meghalaya High Court as "undemocratic". Following her retirement, the chairman of the Madras Bar Association, A.R.L. Sundaresan, described the transfer as "shocking," stating that during her tenure as chief justice, Tahilramani had significantly improved the hearing and disposal of pending cases, especially pending criminal appeals. Other bar associations, including the Madurai Bench of Madras High Court Bar Association convened special meetings to pass resolutions condemning the transfer.

Along with protests from bar associations, the transfer was criticized by a number of public figures. The Hindu carried an editorial in which they stated that it revealed systemic flaws in judicial administration, especially with the Indian Supreme Court's collegium system. The All India Democratic Women's Association described the transfer as "vindictive". Dravidar Kazhagam president K. Veeramani stated that Tahilramani's resignation demonstrated "self-respect," calling for a re-evaluation of judicial administration to increase transparency in transfers. Former Supreme Court judge Madan Lokur wrote that the transfer was " ex facie suggestive of humiliation" and praised her decision to resign instead.

In September 2019, the Madras High Court refused to hear a public interest petition filed by an advocate, which called upon the court to refrain from implementing the order transferring Tahilramani, holding petitioner did not have locus standi to challenge the decision.

Following her retirement, Tahilramani declined to accept any post-judicial appointments, or discuss the transfer with the media.

=== Allegations of corruption ===
Although the Supreme Court of India had refused to publicly disclose reasons for Tahilramani's transfer, in September 2019, the Indian Express published certain allegations which they reported were the substance of the Supreme Court's reasons for the decision. According to the Indian Express, unnamed sources had indicated that there were three reasons for Tahilramani's transfer. According to the Indian Express, the Supreme Court had concerns that Tahilramani was allegedly not working for sufficient hours, was allegedly close to local politicians, had allegedly purchased property in Chennai, and further, had dissolved a bench which was refusing to allow the Central Bureau of Investigation to investigate cases concerning the theft of idols in temples in favour of allowing a retired police official to do so. On 25 September 2019, sitting Supreme Court Justice D.Y. Chandrachud, speaking at a public event, stated that transferring judges was not a solution for alleged complaints against them, calling for reforms in judicial transfers.

On 30 September 2019, after Tahilramani's resignation, the Intelligence Bureau submitted a report based on which the then-Supreme Court Chief Justice Ranjan Gogoi directed an investigation into Tahilramani for allegations of corruption relating to the purchase of properties and the dissolution of the bench hearing cases concerning idol thefts. In November 2019, media reports indicated that there were ongoing campaigns to raise funds to "reconstitute" this special bench that Tahilramani had dissolved, which resulted in a special investigation by the Madras High Court, as the constitution of benches is the prerogative of the court and cannot be compelled for financial reasons. A public interest petition seeking an investigation into these calls for the reconstitution of the special bench is ongoing.

In a memoir published after his retirement, Justice Gogoi, explained that he took the decision to transfer Tahilramani to a court "where there was less work" after he felt there were credible allegations concerning irregularities, against her. Despite such claims, she has never been charged with any wrongdoing at any forum where she would have a chance to clear her name or challenge evidence against her, if any.

== Personal life ==
Tahilramani is of Sindhi heritage.
