= Debasish Kar Gupta =

Indian judge

The Hon'ble Justice Debasish Kar Gupta

Chief Justice of the Calcutta High Court
- In office 30 October 2018 - 31 December 2018; 25 September 2018 - 29 October 2018 (acting)
- Nominated by: Ranjan Gogoi
- Appointed by: Hon. Ram Nath Kovind
- Preceded by: Jyotirmay Bhattacharya (acting)
- Succeeded by: Biswanath Somadder (acting)

Personal details
- Born: 1 January 1957 (age 69)
- Education: University of Calcutta

Debasish Kar Gupta (born 1 January 1957) is a former Chief Justice of the Calcutta High Court, having served in that position from 30 October 2018 to 31 December 2018.

== Education ==
In 1976, Debasish Kar Gupta passed B.Com. and completed his LL.B. in 1980 from the Hazra Law College, University of Calcutta.

== Career ==
He received his enrollment in September 1982 as an advocate. He started law practice in the Calcutta High Court especially on Constitutional law and civil matters including Labour and Service. He also practised in the Central Administrative Tribunal (CAT) and West Bengal Administrative Tribunal (WBAT). Kar Gupta was appointed Junior Standing Counsel for the State of West Bengal in 1996. In 2005 he was designated a Senior Advocate. Debasish Kar Gupta became a permanent judge of the Calcutta High Court in June 2006. After the retirement of the Hon'ble Acting Chief Justice Jyotirmay Bhattacharya he took charge being the next senior most judge of the High Court. On 30 October 2018, he took oath as Chief Justice of the Calcutta High Court.
