= Himansu Kumar Bose =

Indian Judge

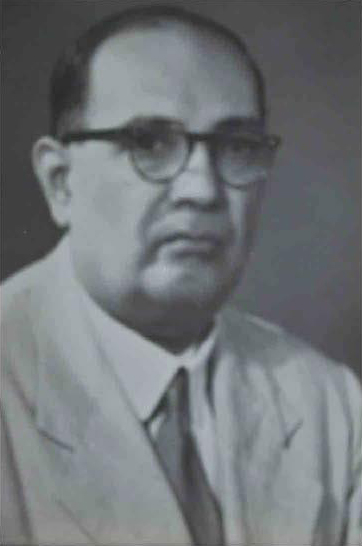
Portrait of Himansu Kumar Bose

Himansu Kumar Bose (1904–1971) was an Indian judge and a former Chief Justice of the Calcutta High Court.

== Career ==
Bose passed M.A., B.L. from the University of Calcutta and became a barrister from London. He joined as a practitioner of the Calcutta High Court. He was appointed the Chief Justice of Calcutta High Court in 1961, succeeding Justice Surajit Chandra Lahiri. Justice Bose retired in 1966.
