= Prasanta =

Prasanta may refer to

- Prasanta Chandra Mahalanobis Mahavidyalaya, College in Kolkata
- Prasanta Pradhan, Indian politician
- Prasanta Banerjee, Indian footballer
- Prasanta Sur, Indian politician
- Prashanta Nanda, Indian politician
- Prasanta Chatterjee, Indian politician
- Prasanta Pattanaik, Professor in economics
- Prasanta Chandra Mahalanobis, Indian scientist
- Prasanta Karmakar, Indian swimmer
- Prasanta Kumar Majumdar, Indian politician
- Prasanta Bihari Mukharji, Indian judge
- Prasanta Digar, Indian politician
