= Bankim Chandra Ray =

Judge of Supreme Court of India and politician (born 1926)

Hon'ble Justice Bankim Chandra Ray

Judge of Supreme Court of India
- In office 29 October 1985 – 31 October 1991
- Nominated by: P.N. Bhagwati
- Appointed by: Zail Singh

Judge of Calcutta High Court
- In office 9 December 1976 – 01 November 1988
- Nominated by: A. N. Ray
- Appointed by: Fakhruddin Ali Ahmed

Personal details
- Born: 1 November 1926 Kanthalberia, 24 Parganas, West Bengal

Bankim Chandra Ray (born 1 November 1926) is a retired judge of the Supreme Court of India and politician.

== Early life ==
Ray was born to Bhuson Chandra Ray into a rich Poundra Kshatriya zamindar family at 24 Praganas, Bengal Presidency, British India (now West Bengal, India). He did his schooling from Multi Peary Srimantha Institution at Magrahat, in 1946 he completed his B.A from Ripon College (now Surendranath College), in 1951 completed his LL.B in from University Law College (now Department of Law, University of Calcutta) and M.A (Political Economy) from University of Calcutta.

== Career ==
In 1952 he got enrolled as a lawyer at Calcutta High Court and started his private practice. He got posted as Additional Judge of Calcutta High Court in June, 1976 and elevated to permanent judge in December, 1976.

Ray was nominated as judge at Supreme Court of India in 1985 and became the second Dalit judge to hold such position after A. Vardarajan. He was associated with Indian National Congress since his college days and contested the 1957 West Bengal legislative assembly election from Baruipur constituency but lost to Gangadhar Naskar of CPI.
