= Baikuntha Nath Sen =

Bengali scholar, lawyer and philanthropist

Baikuntha Nath Sen CIE (1843 – 1922) was a Bengali scholar, lawyer and philanthropist. His grandson Amarendra Nath Sen was a judge of Supreme Court of India.

== Early life ==
Sen was born in a Zamindar family of Alampur village in Bardhaman district in British India. His father Harimohan Sen came to Murshidabad in his early years and settled in Bahrampur. Sen completed his study from Krishnath College School in 1858 and entered into Presidency College, Kolkata. He passed B.A. in 1863 and B.L in 1864 thereafter started practicing in the Calcutta High Court and Baharampur Judges Court. Sen was the legal advisor of Cossimbazar Royal Estate.

== Career ==
Sen achieved great popularity as a lawyer and orator. He was the first editor of Murshidabad Hitaishi, a reputed weekly. He was a great patron of modern education and was associated with various social as well as political works. He was one of the top leaders of the Indian National Congress in Bengal. In 1916–17, he was elected Chairman of the Reception Committee of the session of the Indian national Congress held in Kolkata. Sen became the first unofficial Indian chairman of Berhampore Municipality, the then Murshidabad District Board which was established by Montagu–Chelmsford Reforms. Baikunthanath invested money to established Bengal Pottery Works along with Raja Manindra Chandra Nandy.

== Honour ==
In 1920, Sen was appointed a Companion of the Order of the Indian Empire (CIE) and became Roy Bahadur.
