= Protik Prakash Banerjee =

Indian judge (1969–2020)

Hon'ble Justice Late Protik Prakash Banerjee

Additional Judge of Calcutta High Court
- In office 21 September 2017 – 3 July 2020
- Nominated by: Dipak Misra
- Appointed by: Ram Nath Kovind

Personal details
- Born: 1 June 1969
- Died: 3 July 2020 (aged 51)
- Education: Hazra Law College

Protik Prakash Banerjee (1 June 1969 – 3 July 2020) was an additional judge of the Calcutta High Court.

== Early life ==
Banerjee studied in Calcutta Boys' School and completed his legal education from Hazra Law College in 1994. His father Mukul Prakash Banerjee was a senior Counsel of the Calcutta High Court, having enrolled at the Bar in 1961. Before passing Law he also did a stint as a compere of Western Music at All India Radio, Kolkata from 1986 and served as a regular columnist of The Economic Times on various subjects other than law. In 8 December 2009 he was nominated by the Governor of West Bengal to the Governing Body of the Surendranath Law College and served till 2011.

== Career ==
Banerjee worked as the guest lecturer at the West Bengal National University of Juridical Sciences. He joined the High Court of Calcutta as an advocate in 1995 and was selected for the post of Junior Standing Counsel of the Government of West Bengal in 2011. He also became the Vice President of Bar association of the High Court, Calcutta. On 20 September 2017 he was nominated and took oath as a judge of the Calcutta High Court.

== Awards ==
Banerjee received the best speaker award at the Indian Law Institute Annual Debate of 2007. He was also awarded the Advocate General's Trophy for the most outstanding Emerging Lawyer by the Indian Law Institute (West Bengal Unit) in 2009. He is the first advocate in India to have won a judgment in favor of his client that an arbitrator under the Arbitration and Conciliation Act 1996 is amenable to jurisdiction under Article 227 of the Constitution of India.

== Death ==
Protik Prakash Banerjee died at age 51 on Friday, 3 July 2020 due to heart attack. He is survived by his wife, Piyali Banerjee and their daughter, Samadrita Banerjee.
