= Sabyasachi Mukharji =

20th Chief Justice of India (1927–1990)

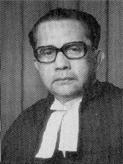

20th Chief Justice of India
- In office 18 December 1989 – 25 September 1990
- Appointed by: Ramaswamy Venkataraman
- Preceded by: E. S. Venkataramiah
- Succeeded by: Ranganath Misra

Judge of Supreme Court of India
- In office 15 March 1983 – 17 December 1989
- Nominated by: Y. V. Chandrachud
- Appointed by: Zail Singh

Judge of Calcutta High Court
- In office 31 July 1968 – 14 March 1983; Acting CJ : 1 March 1983 - 14 March 1983
- Nominated by: M. Hidayatullah
- Appointed by: Zakir Husain

Personal details
- Born: 1 June 1927 Calcutta
- Died: 25 September 1990 (aged 63) London
- Relations: Prasanta Bihari Mukharji (brother)
- Education: B. A. (Hons.) in Economics and LL. B.
- Alma mater: Presidency College, Kolkata; Calcutta University

Sabyasachi Mukharji (1 June 1927 – 25 September 1990) was an Indian jurist, who served as the 20th Chief Justice of India. He also previously served as the acting Chief Justice of the Calcutta High Court.

== Family background ==
Sabyasachi Mukharji was born in Calcutta, the third son of Rai Bahadur Bejoy Bihari Mukharji, first Indian Director General of Land Records, in Bengal Presidency. His elder brothers were Justice Prasanta Bihari Mukharji, Chief Justice of the Calcutta High Court and the eminent cardiologist, Dr. Aurobindo Bihari Mukharji.

== Education ==
He received his secondary education at the Mitra Institution, Bhowanipore, Calcutta; then a degree from Presidency College, Calcutta, followed by a degree in Economics with honours from Calcutta University in 1946. He was called to the bar by the Society of the Middle Temple.

During his student years he was also involved in student politics. In 1945 he was elected General Secretary of the Presidency College Student Union. Later, while studying for the bar in London he was elected General Secretary of the Indian Socialist Group in 1948–49 as well as becoming a member of the Committee of the Inns of Court Student Union representing the Middle Temple.

== Career ==
He began his legal career in 1949 as an advocate at the Calcutta High Court where he did primarily civil, revenue and constitutional cases. Under the first Administrative Reforms Commission (ARC), he served on the Study Team on Administrative Tribunals. In July 1968, he was appointed as a judge on the Calcutta High Court. Starting in June 1982 he worked as a member on the 8th Finance Commission. While on the court Mukharji made a ruling on an election rolls issue that delayed an election. The Election Commission sought superintending control from the Supreme Court which ordered him to hear the case immediately and issue his ruling within five days. While complying with the order he made it quite clear that timing and such issues were within the discretion of the sitting judge and not subject to superintending control. He confirmed his earlier order. On 1 March 1983, he became acting Chief Justice of the Calcutta High Court.

On 15 March 1983, Mukharji was appointed as a judge of the Supreme Court of India, and he became Chief Justice of India on 18 December 1989. In March 1989, Mukharji became involved with the Bhopal gas incident when he was appointed to head the Supreme Court's panel to examine the vadility of the "Bhopal Gas Leak Act" ("Bhopal Settlement Act"). He issued his initial opinion just five days after becoming Chief Justice, but did not live to see the court's final disposition of the matter. It was also during his term in the summer of 1990 that corruption charges surfaced against judges on the Bombay High Court, which caused a "crisis of credibility" in the judiciary for the whole country. Charges of corruption, nepotism, casteism and politicisation of appointments for most of the high courts began to make the news. Mukharji worked to keep the judiciary independent and worked to solve the problems. Justice Mukharji has received criticism for his handling of the V. Ramaswami case, where his appointment of a committee did not result in corrective action, although Parliament was almost unable to resolve that case. Regarding the conduct of judges, Mukharji said: The Judges either of the Supreme Court or the High Courts and the Chief Justice are subject to the rule of law like any other citizen of this country and must abide by the norms and regulations prescribed in as much as these and to the extent are applicable to them. I always thought this was clear and need no reiteration. We must therefore, ensure that there is no conduct of the Judges which affects the faith of the people that Judges do not live according to law.

Over the course of his Supreme Court tenure, Mukharji authored 315 judgments and sat on 597 benches.

Mukharji died of a heart attack complicated by diabetes on 25 September 1990 in London, having just arrived from a lecture tour of the United States. He was the second Chief Justice to die in office, the first have been Chief Justice H. J. Kania.

Legal offices
Preceded by Engalaguppe Seetharamiah Venkataramiah	Chief Justice of India; 18 December 1989– 25 September 1990	Succeeded by Ranganath Misra
