= Loreto House =

Loreto House, Kolkata
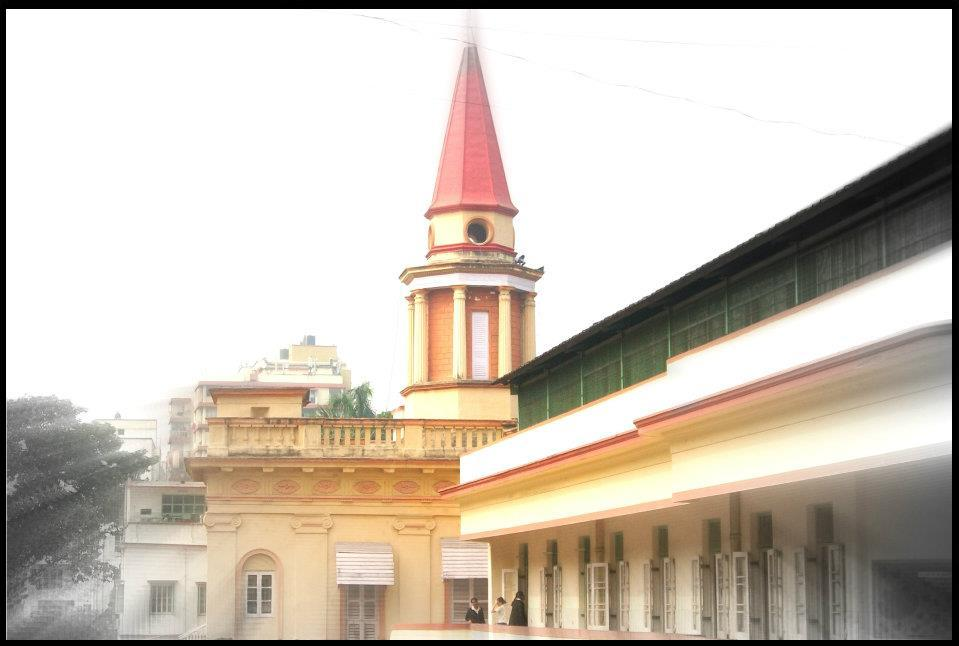
- 7, Middleton Row, Kolkata, India

Information
- Type: Primary, Secondary
- Established: 1842
- Principal: P. Bagchi
- Gender: Female
- Houses: Gandhi (Brown), Keller (Red), Kennedy (Yellow), Mary Ward (Purple), Naidu (Blue), Tagore (Green)
- Color(s): Red, White and Blue
- Athletics: Basketball etc
- Website: www.loretohousekolkata.com

Loreto House, Kolkata was established in 1842 in Kolkata, by the Loreto sisters belonging to the institute of the Blessed Virgin Mary. It is the oldest and the first Loreto institution to be established in India and was one of the few all-girls Catholic schools of that time.

The School started with sixty students who were taught at a house where nuns lived under Mother Delphine Hart, assisted by Sr. Teresa Mons and Sr. Martina McCann.

The School was initially established for the education of Catholic girls. However, it has long admitted students of many religious beliefs. Currently it is headed by Sister Phyllis. The school is known for hosting annual events like 'We Care' and their popular bi-annual 'Big Fete'.

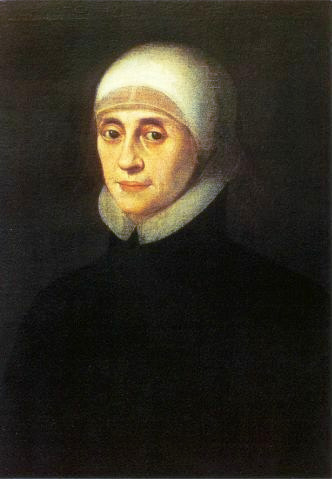
Mary Ward

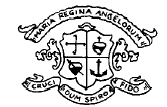
School Crest

== Notable alumni ==
- Justice Indira Banerjee – judge, Supreme Court of India
- Shobhana Bhartia – chairperson, editorial director Hindustan Times(HT) Media Group
- Ridhima Ghosh – Bengali actress
- Abha Narain Lambah – conservation architect
- Raima Sen – Bengali actress
- Riya Sen – Bengali actress

== See also ==
- Loreto College, Kolkata
