= Chunder Madhub Ghose =

Indian judge

Chunder Madhub Ghose (1838—20 January 1918) was the former acting Chief Justice of Calcutta High Court.

== Career ==
Ghosh was born in 1838 in British India. He was entered into the Presidency Colleges, Calcutta, and passed the Law Examination 1860. Ghosh started practice in Bardhaman. He was appointed as Government Pleader and also appointed Deputy Collector. He became the President of the Law Faculty, University of Calcutta. He was the Member of Legislative Council, Bengal. In 1885, Ghosh became the Judge of the Calcutta High Court. Thereafter he became the acting Chief Justice of the High Court in 1906. In the same year he became the Knight Bachelor.
