= Prasanta Bihari Mukharji =

Hon'ble Chief Justice (Retd.) Prasanta Bihari Mukharji

16th Chief Justice of Calcutta High Court
- In office 1970–1972
- Appointed by: V. V. Giri
- Preceded by: Deep Narayan Sinha
- Succeeded by: Sankar Prasad Mitra

Personal details
- Born: 1909
- Died: 1984 (age 73 or 74)
- Relations: Sabyasachi Mukharji (brother)

Prasanta Bihari Mukharji (1909 - 1984) was the 16th Chief Justice of the Calcutta High Court. He served as Chief Justice from 1970 to 1972. He authored numerous books mainly on law and philosophy. Mukharji also held the Tagore Law Professorship at the Calcutta University.

== Family ==
Mukharji was the eldest son of Rai Bahadur Bejoy Bihari Mukharji. His youngest brother, Sabyasachi Mukharji, later became Chief Justice of India. Prasanta Bihari Mukharji was married to Gita Mukharji, who won the Indian Red Cross Society Medal in 1964.

== Career ==
As a young lawyer he had been part of the legal team in the famous Bhawal case. Mukharji was the youngest lawyer in British India to have become a High Court judge. Mukharji was also a noted constitutional scholar and authored several books on the subject. Amongst his books on the subject were The Critical Problems of the Indian Constitution (1967), Three Elemental Problems of the Indian Constitution (1972) and The Indian Constitution: Change and Challenge (1976). Aside from works on law and the constitution, Mukharji also authored books on Bengali literature and Vedantic philosophy. These included Bankim Sahitya Samaj O Sadhana [ Bankimchandra Chatterjee 's Writings: Society and Striving] (1967) and The Panorama of the Life, Message and Philosophy of Shankara (1977).
