= Indira Banerjee =

Indian judge (born 1957)

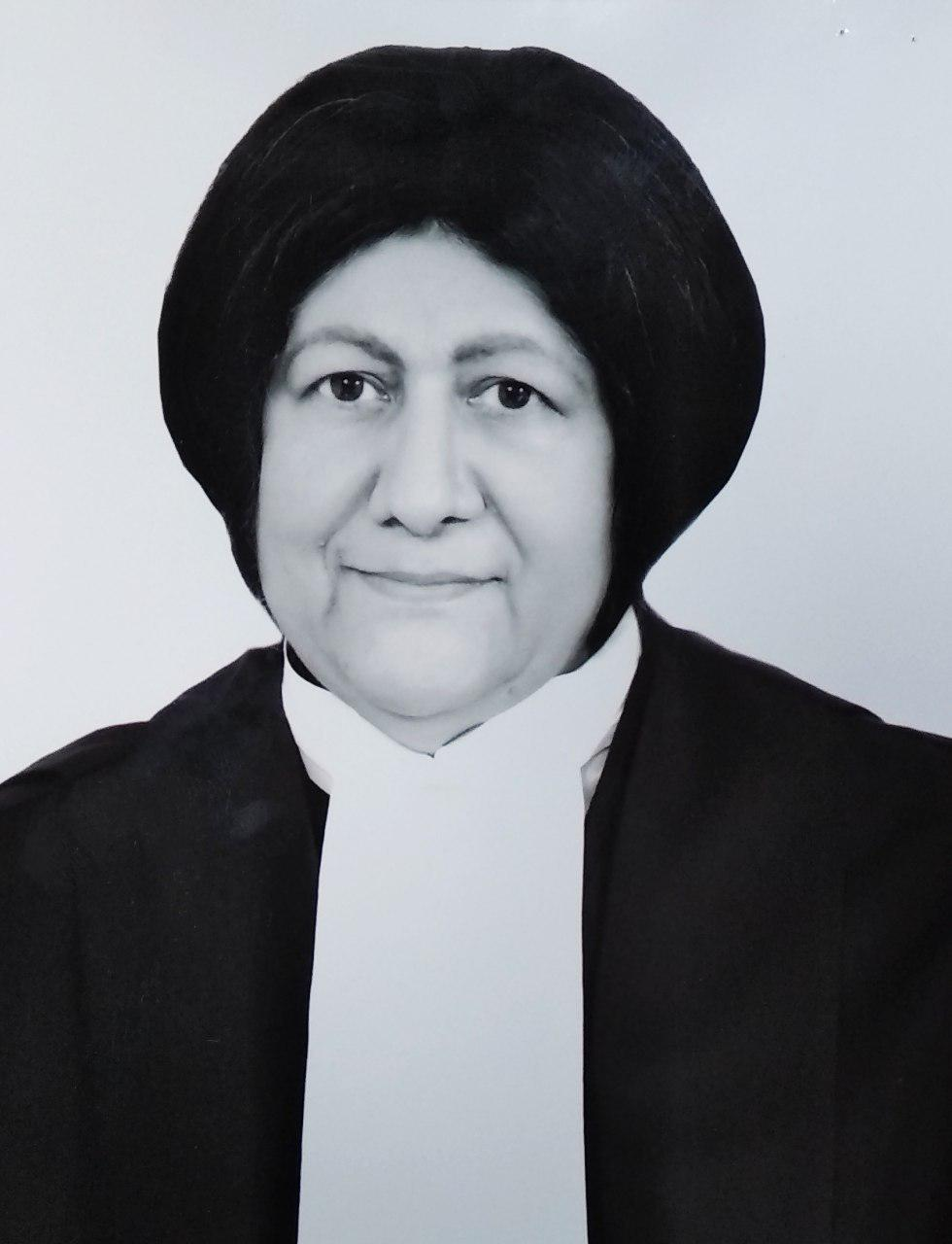

Judge of the Supreme Court of India
- In office 7 August 2018 – 23 September 2022
- Nominated by: Dipak Misra
- Appointed by: Ram Nath Kovind

Chief Justice of the Madras High Court
- In office 5 April 2017 – 6 August 2018
- Appointed by: Pranab Mukherjee
- Preceded by: Sanjay Kishan Kaul
- Succeeded by: Vijaya Tahilramani

Judge of the Delhi High Court
- In office 8 August 2016 – 4 April 2017
- Nominated by: T. S. Thakur
- Appointed by: Pranab Mukherjee

Judge of the Calcutta High Court
- In office 5 February 2002 – 7 August 2016
- Nominated by: Sam Piroj Bharucha
- Appointed by: A. P. J. Abdul Kalam

Personal details
- Born: 24 September 1957 (age 69) Kolkata, West Bengal
- Education: Presidency University, Kolkata; University of Calcutta

Indira Banerjee (born 24 September 1957) is a retired Indian jurist who served as a judge of the Supreme Court of India and the eighth female judge in history of the Indian Supreme Court. Previously, she served as chief justice of the Madras High Court, the second woman to hold the position.

== Early life and education ==
Indira Banerjee was born on 24 September 1957. She started her education at the Loreto House in Kolkata. She pursued higher education at the Presidency University, Kolkata and the Department of Law, University of Calcutta.

== Judicial career ==
She was enrolled as an advocate on 5 July 1985 and practised before the Calcutta High Court. Banerjee was appointed a permanent judge of the Calcutta High Court on 5 February 2002 and transferred to the Delhi High Court with effect from 8 August 2016. She was elevated as the chief justice of the Madras High Court and assumed charge on 5 April 2017.

Banerjee succeeded Justice Sanjay Kishan Kaul as the chief justice of the Madras High Court, after she was elevated to the Supreme Court of India. She is the second woman to head the chartered High Court, after Justice Kanta Kumari Bhatnagar who headed the court between June and November 1992. She was elevated as a judge of Supreme Court of India on 7 August 2018. She was retired on 23 September 2022.
