= Phani Bhusan Chakravartti =

11th Chief Justice of Calcutta High Court

Hon'ble Chief Justice Phani Bhushan Chakravartti
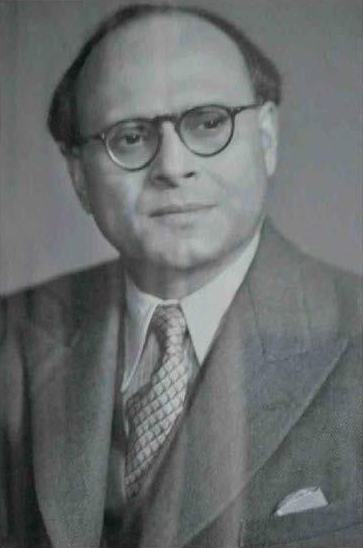
- Portrait of Phani Bhusan Chakravartti

11th Chief Justice of Calcutta High Court
- In office 13 June 1952 – 11 October 1958
- Appointed by: Rajendra Prasad
- Preceded by: Arthur Trevor Harries
- Succeeded by: Kulada Charan Das Gupta

Judge of Calcutta High Court
- In office 1945 – 12 June 1952
- Appointed by: George VI

Personal details
- Born: 12 October 1898 Dhaka, British India (present day in Bangladesh)
- Died: 8 May 1981 (aged 82)

Phani Bhushan Chakravartti (1898 – 8 May 1981) was an Indian jurist who became the first Indian to serve as the permanent Chief Justice of the Calcutta High Court. He also served as an acting Governor of West Bengal.

== Career ==
Chakravartti was born in British India in Dhaka. Before joining the legal profession, Chakravartti worked as a professor of English at Jagannath College in Dhaka and Ripon College, Calcutta between 1920 and 1926. His academic background distinguished him from many judges whose careers began directly in legal practice.

In April 1945, Chakravartti was appointed a judge of the Calcutta High Court. Following India's independence, he rose to the court's highest office, succeeding Sir Arthur Trevor Harries as Chief Justice on 13 June 1952. He held the position until 11 October 1958, when he retired and was succeeded by Justice Kulada Charan Das Gupta. His appointment marked an important milestone in the Indianisation of the higher judiciary, as he was the first Indian to become the court's permanent Chief Justice.

Chakravartti also played a role in West Bengal's constitutional administration. Following the death of Governor of West Bengal, Dr. Harendra Coomar Mookerjee in August 1956, he assumed the responsibilities of Acting Governor of West Bengal from 8 August until appointment of Padmaja Naidu as new Governor on 3 November 1956.

== Writings ==
Chakravartti wrote a book named Morning Blossoms.
