= Sambhu Chandra Ghose =

Indian judge

Sambhu Chandra Ghose, M.A, LL.B. was the Chief Justice of the Calcutta High Court from 1981 to 1983. He succeeded Justice Amarendra Nath Sen as the Chief Justice. His son Justice Pinaki Chandra Ghose was the first Lokpal and former judge of Supreme Court of India.
