= Brajendra Nath Seal =

Indian academic and scholar (1864–1938)

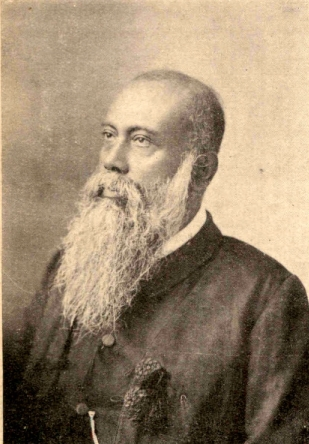
- Brajendra Nath Seal, c. 1911
- Born: 3 September 1864; Haripal, Hoogly, Bengal Presidency, British India (now in West Bengal, India)
- Died: 3 December 1938 (aged 74); Calcutta, Bengal Presidency, British India
- Education: Scottish Church College (BA); University of Calcutta (PhD)
- Occupations: Philosopher; Lawyer
- Spouse: Indumati Rakshit
- Parent: Mahendra Nath Seal (father)

Sir Brajendra Nath Seal (Bengali: ব্রজেন্দ্রনাথ শীল; 3 September 1864 – 3 December 1938) was a Bengali Indian humanist philosopher. He served as the second vice chancellor of Mysore University.

He began his career as a lecturer at the Scottish Church College. His research works were published in some of leading journals during the British Raj, such as the Calcutta Review, Modern Review, New India, Dawn, Bulletin of Mathematical Society, Indian Culture, Hindustan Standard, British Medical Journal, Prabasi, Sabuj Patra, and Visva-Bharati.

== Life ==
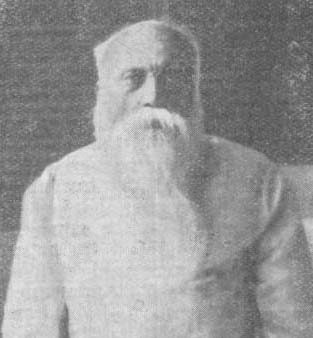

Brajendranath Seal was born in Haripal, Hoogly District (in West Bengal), in 1864 in a Bengali Hindu Banik family. His father Mohendranath Seal was one of the earliest followers of Comtean positivism in Bengal. As a student of philosophy at the General Assembly's Institution (now Scottish Church College, Calcutta), he became attracted to Brahmo theology. And along with his better-known classmate and friend Narendranath Dutta, the future Swami Vivekananda, he regularly attended meetings of the Sadharan Brahmo Samaj. Later they would part ways with Dutta aligning himself with Keshub Chunder Sen's New Dispensation (and later on to found his own religious movement, the Ramakrishna Mission) and Seal staying on as an initiated member.

Seal was the inaugural chair of philosophy at India's first graduate school in philosophy at the University of Calcutta. Seal was regarded as 'a versatile scholar in many branches of learning, both scientific and humanistic,' and in his major work The Positive Sciences of Ancient Hindus demonstrated 'interrelations among the ancient Hindu philosophical concepts and their scientific theories.' He was appointed as the principal of Krishnath College in Berhampore.

Seal was the keynote speaker at the first session of the First Universal Races Congress of 1911 on 26 July 1911, which gathered speakers and attendees from across the world to discuss racial issues and encourage international cooperation. Part of his address included the declaration that

We are assisting at a solemn function, the conferring of a new charter, the charter of the modern conscience, on each race and nation as a member of the world-system... From this watch-tower of Humanity, we seem to hear the measureless tread of generations behind and before, to witness the universal march and procession of Humanity, at the opening of a new era...

Michael Biddiss notes that Seal's opening words 'set the tone of effusion and euphoria' which pervaded much of the Congress as a whole. Seal served as the vice chancellor of Mysore University from 1921 and retired in 1930 following a paralytic stroke.

== Books ==
- A Memoir on the Co-efficient of Numbers: A Chapter on the Theory of Numbers (1891)
- Neo-Romantic Movement in Bengali Literature (1890–91)
- A Comparative Study of Christianity and Vaishnavism (1899)
- New Essays in Criticism (1903)
- Introduction to Hindu Chemistry (1911)
- Positive Sciences of the Ancient Hindus (1915)
- Race-Origin (1911)
- Syllabus of Indian Philosophy (1924)
- Rammohan Roy: The Universal Man (1933)
- The Quest Eternal (1936)

== See also ==
- List of alumni of Scottish Church College
