= Kulada Charan Das Gupta =

Former Judge of Supreme Court of India (1959-1965)

Hon'ble Justice Kulada Charan Das Gupta
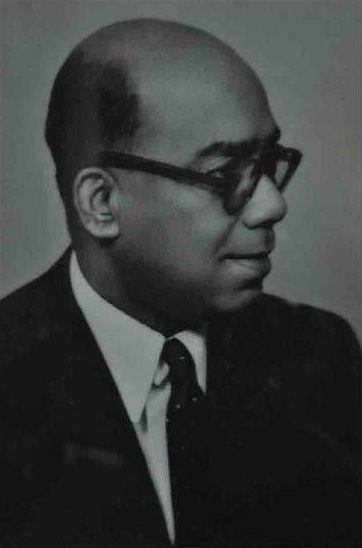
- Portrait of Kulada Charan Das Gupta

Judge of Supreme Court of India
- In office 29 August 1959 – 2 January 1965
- Nominated by: Sudhi Ranjan Das
- Appointed by: Rajendra Prasad

12th Chief Justice of Calcutta High Court
- In office 12 October 1958 – 17 August 1959
- Appointed by: Rajendra Prasad
- Preceded by: P. B. Chakravartti
- Succeeded by: S. C. Lahiri

Judge of Calcutta High Court
- In office June 1948 – 11 October 1958
- Appointed by: C. Rajagopalachari

Personal details
- Born: 3 January 1900 Kalia village, Bengal Presidency (present day in Bangladesh)
- Died: 14 February 1987 (aged 87)
- Education: Hindu School, Kolkata, Presidency University, Kolkata (B.A.), Magdalene College, Cambridge

Kulada Charan Das Gupta (3 January 1900 – 14 February 1987) also known as K. C. Das Gupta, was an Indian jurist who served as Chief Justice of the Calcutta High Court and later as a judge of the Supreme Court of India.

== Early life ==
Das Gupta was born in Kalia village in Bengal, then part of British India (now in Bangladesh). His father Annada Charan was a government servant. He received his early education at Hindu School and studied Economics at Presidency College, Calcutta, where he obtained his B.A. in 1920. He subsequently pursued higher studies at Magdalene College, Cambridge, completing the Economics Tripos in 1923.

== Career ==
Das Gupta joined the Indian Civil Service (ICS) and served in Bengal as an Assistant Magistrate and Collector. He was promoted as District and Session Judge in 1934 but took leave for higher studies in law. In 1938 Das Gupta returned to England and was called to the Bar from Gray's Inn in 1938. He was appointed a judge of the Calcutta High Court in June 1948.

On 12 October 1958, he became Chief Justice of the Calcutta High Court after retirement of Justice Phani Bhusan Chakravartti. On 24 August 1959, he was appointed a judge of the Supreme Court of India after retirement of Natwarlal H. Bhagwati, where he served until 2 January 1965.

In October, 1958 Das Gupta became the chairman, Commission to enquire into Monopolies and Concentration of Wealth.

Apart from law Das Gupta was a scholar of Economics and Sanskrit Literature. He died on 14 February 1987.
