= Pinaki Chandra Ghose =

Indian judge (born 1952)

Pinaki Chandra Ghosh
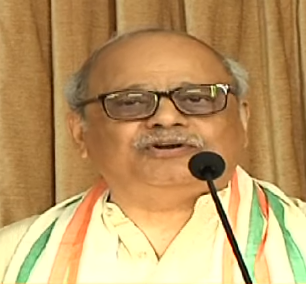

Chairperson of Lokpal of India
- In office 23 March 2019 – 27 May 2022
- Nominated by: Statutory High-Level Selection Panel (committee) or Body
- Appointed by: Ram Nath Kovind
- Preceded by: Position established
- Succeeded by: Pradip Kumar Mohanty

Judge of the Supreme Court of India
- In office 8 March 2013 – 27 May 2017
- Nominated by: Altamas Kabir
- Appointed by: Pranab Mukherjee

Personal details
- Born: 28 May 1952 (age 74) Kolkata, West Bengal, India
- Education: Ramakrishna Mission Vidyapith Purulia (BCom, LLB)
- Alma mater: St. Xavier's College, Kolkata; Department of Law, University of Calcutta

Pinaki Chandra Ghose (born 28 May 1952) was the first Lokpal, or ombudsman, of India, serving from 23 March 2019 to 27 May 2022. He is a retired judge of the Supreme Court of India.

== Early life and education ==
Ghose has had a longstanding association with The Ramakrishna Mission. He had his schooling at The Ramakrishna Mission Vidyapeeth at Deogarh and Purulia.

== Career ==
Prior to his elevation to the Supreme Court, he had served as chief justice of the Andhra Pradesh High Court, and before that, as a judge of the Calcutta High Court. At the time of his appointment he was a member of the National Human Rights Commission. During his tenure as the judge of the High Court at Calcutta, he was the executive chairman of West Bengal State Legal Services Authority and the Andaman and Nicobar Legal Services Authority. He was also appointed a member of the National Legal Services Authority.

Ghose serves as a vice president of the Institute of Culture, Golpark. He is the chairperson of the Board of Governors of Belur Vidyamandir - B.Ed College.

He served as a member of the Executive Committee of the National University of Juridical Sciences at Calcutta as the nominee of the Chief Justice of India.

=== 1st Lokpal of India ===
He was appointed the first Lokpal of India on 19 March 2019 and the president of India administered the oath of office to him on 23 March 2019. On 27 May 2022, he has retired from the post of Lokpal due to his superannuation. Pradip Kumar Mohanty, who was serving as a Member (Judicial) of Lokpal was given additional charge of the Lokpal on 28 May 2022.

== Family ==
Ghose is son of Late Shri Justice Sambhu Chandra Ghose, former chief justice of Calcutta High Court. He is a fifth generation lawyer from a renowned family of Lawyers. Hara Chandra Ghose, who became the first Indian chief judge of the Sadar Dewani Adalat at Calcutta in 1867, was a member of this family.

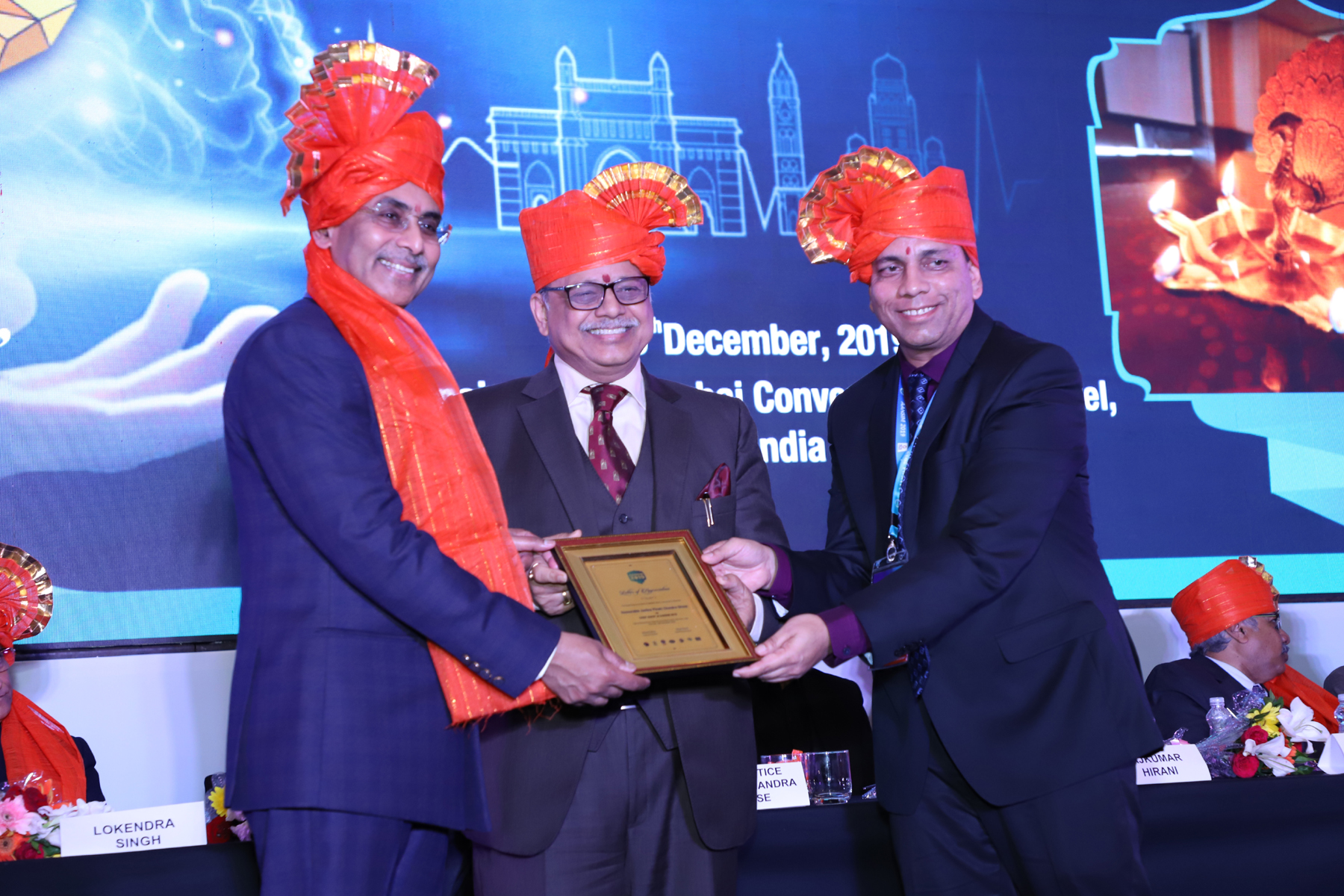
Justice Ghose being felicitated at a neurosurgery conference in 2019
