= Rameshwarlall Daulatram Nopany =

- Born: Rameshwarlall Daulatram Nopany; 1902; Calcutta
- Died: 1978 (aged 75–76); Calcutta India
- Other name: R L Nopany also spelled R L Nopani
- Occupations: sugar mill ownwer, industrialist, philanthropist, freedom fighter

Rameshwarlall Daulatram Nopany also known as R. L. Nopany (1902 - 1978), was a philanthropist, sugar-mill owner and businessman based in Calcutta, India. He is also noted for his contributions in Indian Independence Movement and later founding various educational institutions in Calcutta and the rural areas of Bihar and Rajasthan.

== Career ==
=== Nopany Group ===
He was son of Seth Daulatram Nopany, who are originally from Mahansar in Rajasthan. He along with his elder brother Rawatmull Daulatram Nopany founded the Nopany Group of Industries in decade of 1930. He completed his education from Scottish Church College of Calcutta.

The firm Messrs. Daulatram Rawatmull & Daulatram Rameshwarlall owned several sugar mills like Shree Hanuman Sugar Mills at Motihari, Mewar Sugar Mills at Bhupalsagar, Rajasthan, North Behar Sugar Mills at Naraipur, Bihar, Belsund Sugar Co at Riga, Bihar. The group also holds Nopany Investments. Hanuman Sugar Mills at Motihari was one of the biggest in Bihar at time of independence of India with 12000 acres of land area held by Rameshwarlal Nopany.

Chandra Shekhar Nopany, the great-grandson of Rawatmull (brother of Rameshwarlall Daulatram Nopany & co-founder of Nopany group), who is son of Bimal Kumar Nopany & Nandini Nopany (daughter of Krishna Kumar Birla), now controls most of Nopany Group and a major part of K K Birla group.

=== Other organisational affiliations ===
Furthermore, he was a director in United Commercial Bank, Hindusthan Mercantile Bank, Ruby General Insurance Co, Mahabir Collieries Ltd., New Huntodih Coal Co, The headquarter of Nopany group remained in Calcutta with branches in various state including an office in Bombay.

He served as the President of Indian Sugar Mills Association (1940–41), Bihar Sugar Mills Association, Indian Chamber of Commerce (1942–43), Indian Hemp Association (1941–43), & Treasurer, Federation of Indian Chambers of Commerce & Industry (1933–34).

He was also a member of Indian Central Sugarcane Committee and Indian Central Oil-seeds Committee of Government of India.

== Philanthropy ==
He also founded many schools across India among which Shri Daulatram Nopany Vidyalaya, a High School at Kolkata is a premier institute run now by Nopany family. Nopany Girls School, Pretoria High School, Ganges Gurukul and at the college level, Nopany Institute of Management Studies all in Kolkata. Other schools founded by them are North Bihar Sugar Mills High School at Narainpur in Bihar, Rameshwar Lall Nopany Vidhya Mandir at Bhagalpur, Seth Daulatram Nopany Vidyabhawan, Mahansar.

== Contributions in Freedom Struggle ==
Rameshwar Lall Noapny was a close associate of Ghanshyam Das Birla. During the underground independence movement led by Jai Prakash Narayan, Ghanshyam Das Birla, Rameshwar Lall Nopany and G. L Mehta provided secret funding and logistic support to the leaders. Later, inspired by them, other businessmen such as B K Rohtagi and M G Bhagat also joined in giving financial support to underground leaders. The other prominent leaders besides Jai Prakash Narayan like R. R. Diwakar, Achyut Patwardhan, Baba Raghub Das and others were also in touch with them and secretly met them at Calcutta and got financial and logistic support.

Marwar Government had adopted repressive policy against independence activist during Quit India Movement. Rameshwar Lall Nopany and other Marwari Businessman like Sitaram Seksaria, Basant Lal Murarka, Mangtu Ram Jaipuria, Ishwar Prasad Jalan, Ram Kumar Bhuwalka, Bhanwar Mal Singhi, Ganga Prasad Bhotika, Matadeen Khaitan passed a resolution against the government's policy and came in open support for independence movement.
