= Girish Chandra Gupta =

Indian judge

Girish Chandra Gupta (born 1 December 1954) is a retired Indian judge and a former Chief Justice of Calcutta High Court.

== Career ==
Gupta passed LL.B. and enrolled as an advocate on 20 September 1982. He practiced in the Calcutta High Court for 17 years in Civil, Constitutional, Company, Arbitration and Commercial matters. He was appointed a permanent Judge of the Calcutta High Court on 15 September 2000. Gupta has been officiating as acting chief justice for Calcutta High Court since Chief Justice Manjula Chellur was transferred to Bombay High Court. Finally he became the Chief Justice of the same High Court on 21 September 2016. Justice Gupta's appointment as Chief Justice is a rare occurrence because the current policy on judges' appointments, evolved in 1998 bars the elevation of a high court judge as chief justice of the same High Court. He retired on 30 November 2016 and was appointed the Chairman of West Bengal Human Rights Commission.
