= West Bengal Administrative Tribunal =

Tribunal in India

West Bengal Administrative Tribunal (WBAT) popularly known as SAT (State Administrative Tribunal, West Bengal) is a tribunal for the disposal of cases relating to service matter of the employees of the Government of West Bengal.

== Functions ==
West Bengal Administrative Tribunal was established on 16 January 1995 at Bikas Bhavan, Salt Lake, Kolkata in the Indian state of West Bengal. The Tribunal was set up under the Administrative Tribunal Act, 1985 for speedy disposal of cases relating to service matter of the employees and officers of the West Bengal Government. It comprises with Judicial and administrative members headed by a Chairman having qualification specified under Administrative Tribunal Act. Calcutta High Court is the appellate authority of this Tribunal.
