= Mahansar =

- village
- Location in Rajasthan, India Mahansar (India)
- Coordinates: 28.188244°N 74.992676°E
- Country: India
- State: Rajasthan
- District: Jhunjhunu

Languages
  - Official: Hindi
- Time zone: UTC+5:30 (IST)
- Postal code: 331030
- ISO 3166 code: RJ-IN
- Vehicle registration: rj 18

Mahansar is a village in the Shekhawati region in Rajasthan, India. It was founded in 1768 by the Thakurs of one of the branch of Shekhawats. It is located in Jhunjhunu District at a distance of 40 km from Jhunjhunu near the trifurcation of Jhunjhunu, Churu and Sikar districts.

Mahansar is known for its rich and heritage culture, the Sone-Chandi ki Dukan dating from 1846. It incorporates gold leaf in its intricate paintings. This haveli has three vaulted ceilings; scenes from the Ramayana are painted on the left one, incarnations of Vishnu on the centre one, and scenes from the life of Krishna are to be found on the right one.

It is quite popular for its heritage liquor. By the efforts of Rajendra Singh Shekhawat, (descendant of the 8th generation of Mahansar family) this liquor has gained popularity in various states of India like Rajasthan, Haryana, Punjab, Chandigarh, Himachal Pradesh, Madhya Pradesh, Goa.

Attractions include the mid-19th century Raghunath temple, the Sona ki Dukan haveli and the Sahaj Ram Poddar Chhatri.
