= Bhaskar Choudhury =

Indian politician (1945–1994)

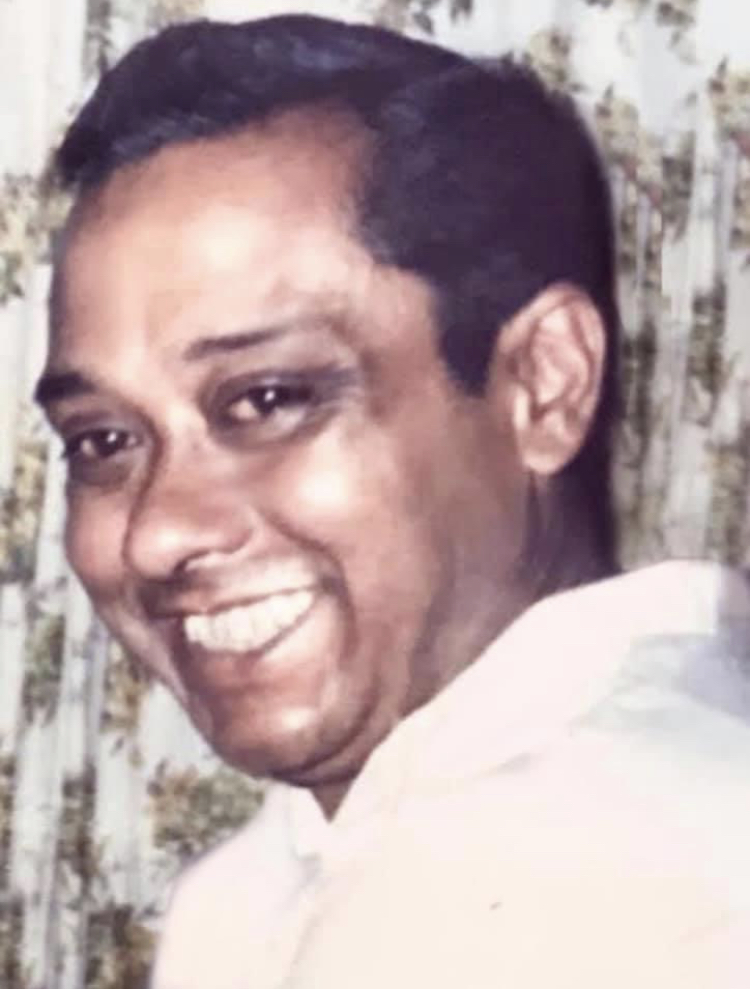
Shri Bhaskar Choudhury

Shri Bhaskar Choudhury (1 November 1945 – 12 September 1994) was an active Indian politician from Shillong, Meghalaya. He was an important member of the Indian National Congress Party, serving in the Meghalaya District Council from 1972 to 1977 and in the Meghalaya Legislative Assembly, for two terms from 1978 to 1988.

== Education and early life ==
Shri Bhaskar Choudhury was born on 1 November 1945, into a prominent family of eminent scholars and freedom fighters.

Choudhury was a Xaverian from St. Xaviers College, Calcutta. He held a bachelor's degree in Law and a master's degree in Commerce, both from the University of Calcutta.

His interest in sports led him to represent Calcutta University as a joint secretary of the executive committee of the athletic team, cricket team and basketball team in 1967–1968. He was awarded the Principal S Roy Memorial Shield in Cricket, and became an "Inter Collegiate Champion" in basketball of the University College of Law, Calcutta. He was an active team player in badminton at St. Xavier's College.

He became involved with politics from his early college life & was soon serving as an active member in a variety of positions within the University Union.

== Family ==
Shri Bhaskar Chouhdury was born to Smt. Sabitri Choudhury and Shri Binoy Bhushan Choudhury, an electrical engineer and a freedom fighter. His elder uncle, Shri Bidhu Bhushan Choudhury was a civil engineer in undivided Assam, who constructed the road to the Shakti Temple of Goddess Kamakhya in Nilachal Hills. His younger uncle, Shri Bibhu Bhushan Choudhury was involved with the freedom movement and had started Asomiya Sahitya Mandir, Charu Sahitya Kutir, Jatiya Sahitya Parishad, Bimal Prakash Bhavan and was one of the founders of Shillong College. Bhaskar Choudhury was married to Smt. Sunanda Choudhury. a retired school teacher, in 1971. His elder daughter Menakshi is a Software Engineer and his younger daughter Sukanya is a Media Professional.

== Professional and political career ==
A lawyer by profession, he practiced in both Shillong and Guwahati High Courts. Choudhury was a member of Bar Association, Shillong.

Shri Bhaskar Choudhury was first elected in the MDC (Meghalaya District Council) elections held in 1972. He was the first non-Khasi to win the MDC elections from the state. In office from 1972 to 1977. In the 1978 Meghalaya Legislative Assembly elections he was elected from Laban constituency as MLA, where he would serve from 1978 to 1988.

Choudhury was the Vice Chairman of Law Commission, Meghalaya.

Choudhury made an immense contribution as president of the Sanatan Dharmasabha Harisabha, one of the oldest Hindu religious institutes in Shillong. With his initiative, the foundation stone of the temple was laid in Harisabha.

He held the position of President at Laban Girls Higher Secondary School & Lumparing Vidyapeeth Higher Secondary School.

He died unexpectedly on 12 September 1994.

== Honours and recognition ==
Honouring him and paying tribute to his invaluable contributions he made towards the society, the bust of Shri Bhaskar Choudhury was unveiled by the people of Shillong on 13 September 2017.
