= Sankar Prasad Mitra =

Bengali Politician and Judge

Sankar Prasad Mitra (26 December 1917 – 9 August 1986) was a Bengali politician and former Chief Justice of the Calcutta High Court. He was one of the acting Governors of West Bengal and the longest serving Chief Justice of the Calcutta High Court.

== Career ==
Mitra was born in 1917 in British India. He contested the 1952 West Bengal Legislative Assembly election on behalf of Indian National Congress and won from Sealdah. He became the Minister of Law and Judicial Department under the Government of West Bengal. Mitra practised law and served as a standing counsel for the State and Central Governments in the High Court. He was appointed the Chief Justice of Calcutta High Court in 1972 and served up to 1979. His seven-year tenure is the longest by any Chief Justice of this High Court. In his tenure Mitra also served as acting Governor of West Bengal.

== Family ==
Sankar Prasad Mitra was married to Aloka Mitra née Bose, the only daughter of Sudhansu Mohan Bose, former advocate general of West Bengal.
