= Samarendra Chandra Deb =

Bengali Indian jurist

Chief Justice of the Calcutta High Court
- In office 1983–1983

Samarendra Chandra Deb was a Bengali Indian jurist, who served as Chief Justice of the Calcutta High Court for a year in 1983, after the retirement of Justice Sambhu Chandra Ghose. He was educated at the Scottish Church College, and at the University of Calcutta.
