= Dipendranath Bandyopadhyay =

Bengali writer

- Born: 10 November 1936; Dhaka, Bengal Presidency, British India
- Died: 14 January 1979 (aged 42); Calcutta, West Bengal, India
- Education: Presidency College, Kolkata; Scottish Church College; University of Calcutta
- Occupations: Poet, writer, political activist
- Spouse: Chinmoyee Bandyopadhyay
- Writing career
- Language: Bengali
- Genres: Novel, short stories, journalism, criticism

Dipendranath Bandyopadhyay (1936–1979) was a Bengali writer, editor, correspondent and political activist. He reshaped Bengali prose writing in late 1950 to 1970, with his deft portrayal of love, protest and anger in post-independence Bengali milieu. Associated with left political activities as student, active member of the Bengal Provincial Student Federation (BPSF), the provincial branch of All India Students Federation (AISF) Dipendratnath was a narrator of the turbulent socio-political vortex of his time. He wrote 51 short stories, 5 novels - including one unfinished - and significant number of reportage or newspaper articles, during his short-lived creative period. Specially his reportages were popular in Bengali readers. Increased political and organisational activity reduced his literary activity which decreased to a trickle in his twilight years.

Bandyopadhyay was posthumously awarded a Friends of Liberation War Honour, the third-highest state award given by the government of Bangladesh for foreigners or non-nationals.

== Editing ==
Bandyopadhyay was an editor of the Bengali periodical - Porichoy - for a brief period. The first issue of Porichoy was published in 1931. From 1931 to 1936 Porichoy was a quarterly. From 1936 onwards Porichoy became a monthly. Rabindranath Tagore wrote a letter of appreciation to the editor which was printed in the second issue of Porichoy. The liberal Sudhindranath Dutta allowed the control of Porichoy to pass on to 'Anti Fascist Writers Association' in 1944. The editorial policy took a radical left shift with increased control of card holders and sympathizers of Communist Party of India. However, Porichoy always acknowledged its intellectual debt to Sudhindranath Dutta and even as late as 2001 there was a special issue to commemorate the poet's birth centenary.

== Novels ==
- Agami, First Part: Majhi, Kartik 1358, November 1951
- Tritiyo Bhuban, Ashwin 1364, October 1957-Published in the periodical 'Notun Sahityo' in 1364. First book edition came out in 1365 from Mitralay
- Ishwarer Sahit Sanglap (Unfinished), Agrahayana -Poush 1367, January 1960
- Gagan Thakurer Siri, Poush 1367- Chaitra-1368, Published in the periodical Bingsha Shatabdi
- Bibahobarshiki, Ashwin 1384, October 1977, Published in Kalantar

== Stories ==
- Shokmichil
- Ashwamedher Ghora
- Hoya Na Hoya

== Reportage ==
1. Amar Desher Manush
2. Durer Maya
3. Ami India
4. Ful Fotar Golpo
5. Na, Voy Koribo Na
6. Michiler Shankho Dhwoni Jelkhanay Prodeep Jwalabe
7. No Pasaron
8. Sordar
9. Procchnno Swadesh
10. Urao Re Urddhe Lal Nishan
11. Arjun Arjun Aaj Lokkho Lokkho Jono Gono Mon
12. Aaj Onyodin
13. Soyuj
14. Ei Bharatborsho
15. Matite Ek Ritu
16. Podochinho, Saptahik Kalantar, 23 December 1967
17. Ghorewalababu, Saptahik Kalantar, 9,16,23 March, 13,20, 27 April 1968
18. Nachiketar Desh, Dainik Kalantar, 31 January 1968
19. Muiktr Path, Porichoy, December 1961
20. Ekti Bitorkomulak Lathichalona, Dainik Kalantar, 31 October 1968
