= John Franks (judge) =

- Born: 1770
- Died: 1852 (aged 81–82)
- Occupation: Judge

Sir John Franks (1770–1852), was an Indian judge.

Franks was the second son of Thomas Franks (1729–1787), of Ballymagooly, County Cork, by Catherine, daughter of Rev. John Day. He was born in 1770, and graduated at Trinity College, Dublin, B.A. 1788, LL.B. 1791. He was called to the Irish Bar 1792. He went on the Munster circuit, and had a good practice as chamber counsel. He became King's Counsel in 1823. In 1825 the Board of Control, on the recommendation of his friend William Plunket, then Attorney General for Ireland, appointed him a judge of the Supreme Court at Calcutta. He received, as was customary, the honour of knighthood before his departure for India. He held this office until the effect of the climate on his health brought about his resignation in 1834. On his return, he resided at Roebuck, near Dublin. He died on 11 January 1852. He married three times. By his first wife, Catherine, daughter of his cousin Thomas Franks of Carrig, Cork, he had two sons and three daughters. His second marriage was to Jane Marshall, and his third to Sarah O'Regan. His eldest son and heir was John Franks of Ballyscaddan, County Limerick; his younger son, Matthew, was an army officer, as were many of his later descendants.

Franks was popular, both as advocate and judge. He was an intimate friend of John Philpot Curran, and one of his executors. W. H. Curran, J.P. Curran's son, commemorates his ‘peculiar aboriginal wit, quiet, keen, and natural to the occasion, and, best of all, never malignant’.

== Arms ==
Coat of arms of John Franks
Notes Confirmed 29 October 1860 by Sir John Berard Burke, Ulster King of Arms. Crest Out of a mural crown Or a griffin's head Gules between two wings Erminois each charged with a mullet Sable. Escutcheon Vert on a saltire Or a griffin's head erased Gules in the centre chief point a mullet of the second. Motto Sic Vos Non Vobis
