= Nityananda Saha =

- Born: 1940
- Died: 2005 (aged 64–65); Kalyani, West Bengal, India
- Education: Scottish Church College; Rajabazar Science College (University of Calcutta)
- Awards: see list in article
- Scientific career
- Fields: Inorganic chemistry
- Workplaces: University of Kalyani; University of Calcutta
- Doctoral advisor: Prof. S.N. Poddar

Nityananda Saha (1940–2005) was a Bengali Indian academic administrator and a professor of inorganic chemistry. Between February 2000 and March 2005, he served as the vice chancellor of the University of Kalyani

== Early life and education ==
After his graduation with honors from the Scottish Church College in 1960, he did his post-graduation from the Rajabazar Science College, University of Calcutta in 1962. He had subsequently earned a doctorate in chemistry in 1968 from the Indian Association for the Cultivation of Science as a student of the University of Calcutta.

== Career ==
He started out as a lecturer in chemistry at the Scottish Church College, and started his own independent research in the field of coordination chemistry. He was involved in numerous postdoctoral research endeavors abroad. In 1986, he became professor of chemistry at the Science college campus of University of Calcutta. He also served as chairman of the West Bengal College Service Commission from December 1991 to January 2000.

In February 2000, he took over as the Vice-Chancellor at the University of Kalyani. In this role, he was a member of the Standing Committee at the Association of Indian Universities (between April 2000 and March 2002), and subsequently between 2003 and 2004, a member of the council at the Inter-University Centre for Astronomy and Astrophysics. He also served as a member of the Court at the Indian Institute of Science, Bangalore between 2002 and 2005. He had also participated in the general conferences of the Executive Heads of Association of Commonwealth Universities in Cyprus in April 2001, and in Belfast, UK in September 2003. During his twilight years, he was able to continue with his dual academic interest of teaching and research throughout the tenure of all his administrative responsibilities, during which he was an extraordinary leave with lien from his position as professor of chemistry at the University of Calcutta.

== Prizes and honours ==
- Prof. Priyadaranjan Ray Memorial Medal from Indian Chemical Society (1994),
- Prof. Baradananda Chatterjee Memorial Lecturer Award (2001) from the erstwhile Bengal Engineering College (deemed university)
- Scientist-in-Charge of the inorganic chemistry section at the Annual Convention of Chemists, Indian Chemical Society, between 1992–1993 and 1997–1999,
- Honorary Editor of the Inorganic and analytical chemistry section, Journal of the Indian Chemical Society in 2000–2001,
- Council Member of the Indian Science News Association, Calcutta, in 2002–2003,
- Foundation Fellow of the West Bengal Academy of Science and Technology.
- Honorary Director of the Academic Staff College, University of Calcutta since its inception in November 1990 to July 1993.

== Fellowships ==
- UNESCO Research Fellow at the School of Chemistry, the University of New South Wales, Australia
- Visiting Research Associate at the Institute of Inorganic Chemistry, University of Basel, Switzerland
- Visiting Research Associate at the Department of Chemistry at the University of Georgia, USA.
