= Pabitra Kumar Giri =

Indian economist

Pabitra Kumar Giri (1955 – 20 May 2010) was an Indian urban economist, who during 1998–2010, served as the Director of the Centre for Urban Economic Studies at the University of Calcutta in Kolkata, India.

== Education ==
He graduated from the Scottish Church College, and the University of Calcutta, from where he earned his doctorate in economics.

== Selected works ==
=== Books ===
- The Flow of Resources in the Regional Economy of West Bengal: The Trends and Processes During 1960-61 to 1970-71 VDM Publishing, 2010 ISBN 978-3-639-24126-6

=== Journal articles ===
- Urbanisation in West Bengal, 1951-1991 Economic and Political Weekly Vol - XXXIII No. 47-48, 21 November 1998
- Interaction between Trading Capital and Productive Capital in Agriculture-An Unexplained Reciprocity (with Debdas Banerjee) Economic and Political Weekly Vol - XIX No. 46, 17 November 1984

=== Research projects ===
- Preparation of Long-term and Short-term Strategy of Howrah Development and Rejuvenation Plan (HDRP)
