= Manjula Chellur =

Former Chief Justice of Bombay High Court

Hon'ble Chief Justice (Retd.) Manjula Chellur
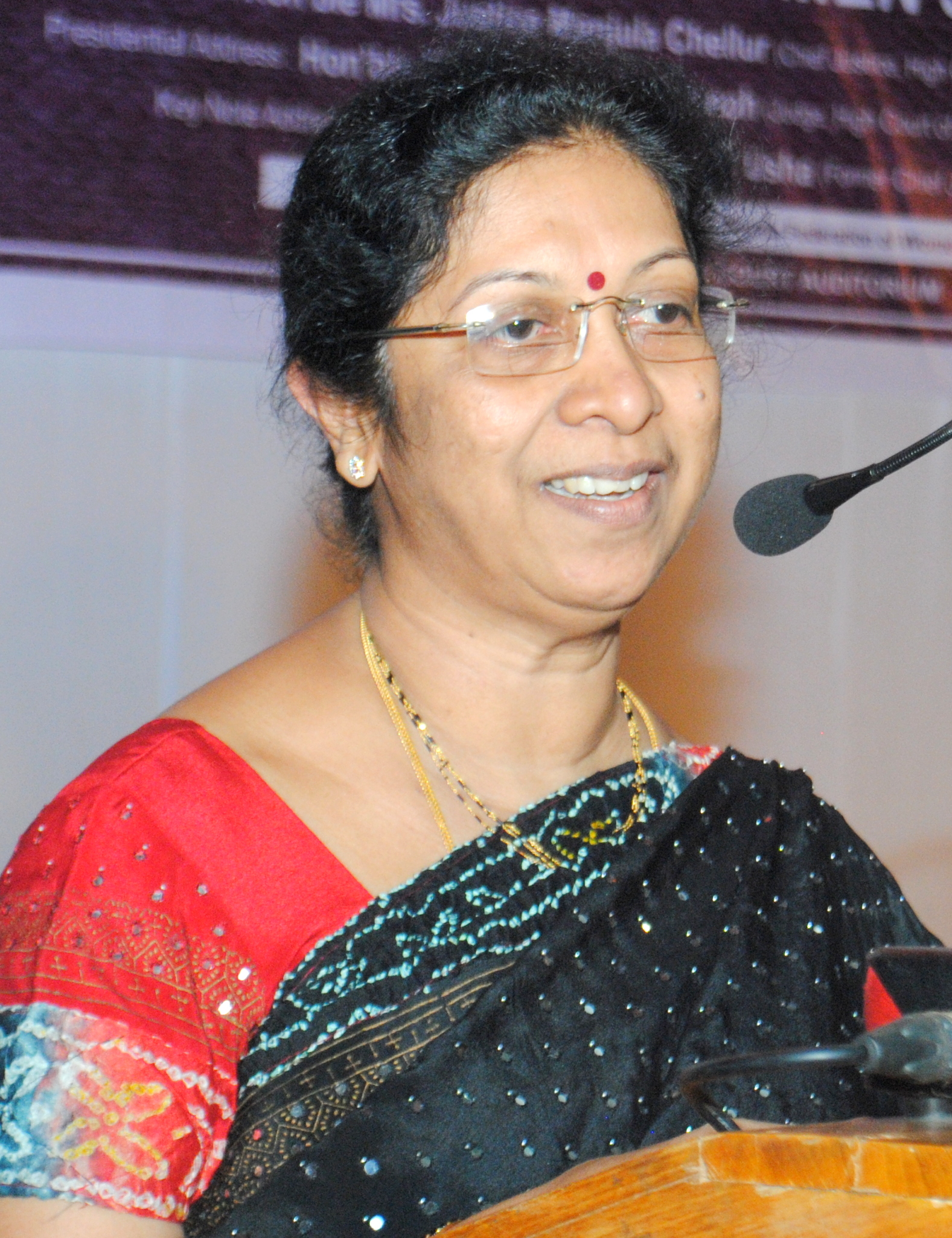

Chief Justice of Bombay High Court
- In office 22 August 2016 – 4 December 2017
- Appointed by: Pranab Mukherjee
- Preceded by: Justice Dhirendra H. Waghela

Chief Justice of Calcutta High Court
- In office 6 August 2014 – 21 August 2016
- Appointed by: Pranab Mukherjee
- Preceded by: Justice Arun Kumar Mishra
- Succeeded by: Justice Girish Chandra Gupta

Chief Justice of Kerala High Court
- In office 26 September 2012 – 5 August 2014 acting: 9 November 2011 – 26 September 2012
- Appointed by: Pratibha Patil (acting); Pranab Mukherjee (permanent)
- Preceded by: Justice Jasti Chelameswar
- Succeeded by: Justice Ashok Bhushan

Judge of High Court of Karnataka
- In office 21 February 2000 – 25 September 2012

Personal details
- Born: 5 December 1955 (age 70) Bellary, Mysore State, India (now in Karnataka, India)
- Citizenship: Indian
- Education: Allum Sunmangalamma Women's College, Bellary

Manjula Chellur (born 5 December 1955) is a retired Indian judge and a former Chief Justice of Bombay High Court. She was the first woman Chief Justice of Calcutta High Court, was the Chief Justice of Kerala High Court and the first female judge of the Karnataka High Court. She demitted her office upon attaining the age of superannuation on 4 December 2017.

== Qualifications ==
Chellur was born in Karnataka. She received her Bachelor of Arts degree from Allum Sunmangalamma Women's College, Bellary, and went on to earn her law degree from Renukacharya Law College, Bangalore. In 1977 the Supreme Court of India sponsored her on a Gender & Law fellowship to England's University of Warwick. In 2013 Chellur received an honorary doctorate from Karnataka State Women's University.

== Career ==
Chellur became the first female advocate to practice law in Bellary. She worked as a legal advisor, practising both civil and criminal law before the local Bellary courts.

In 1988 she was appointed District and Sessions Judge; she served as the Principal and Sessions Judge for Kolar and Mysore. In addition to these positions she was also the Chief Judge of Court of Small Causes, and Principal Judge of the Family Court at Bangalore. On 21 February 2000 she was named judge of Karnataka High Court.

Chellur served as the President of the Karnataka Judicial Academy from 21 June 2008 to 25 March 2010. She was also the executive chairperson of Karnataka State Legal Service Authority. On 9 November 2011 she was appointed Acting Chief Justice of the Kerala High Court and since 26 September 2012 she has been the Chief Justice of Kerala.

=== High-profile cases ===
In 2013 the Division Bench of the Kerala High Court, consisting of Chief Justice Chellur and Justice Vinod Chandran, ordered the state government to submit a statement regarding the high-profile rape case against the Deputy Chairman of the Rajya Sabha, P. J. Kurien. Also in March 2013, the justices refused the plea of prominent Marxist politician and Leader of the Opposition V. S. Achuthanandan for an early hearing in another investigation into the "Ice Cream Parlour sabotage case", involving an ice cream parlour that was allegedly being used as a front to lure girls and women into prostitution in the 1990s.

In a case in 2017 she told doctors protesting against physical assault that if they are so scared of being beaten then they should resign and stay at home. The resident doctors had gone on strike as they demanded safer working environments and wanted to be saved from these assaults. The petitioners were aghast and countered what if judges and lawyers were treated like this if the client's expectations were not met. If the court case went against the accused and the accused or his relatives decided to do the same to the judges and lawyers.
