= Appajee Vardarajan =

Judge of Supreme Court of India

Hon'ble Justice Appajee Varadarajan

Judge of Supreme Court of India
- In office 10 December 1980 – 16 August 1985
- Nominated by: Y. V. Chandrachud
- Appointed by: Neelam Sanjiva Reddy

Judge of Madras High Court
- In office 1974–1980
- Nominated by: A. N. Ray
- Appointed by: Fakhruddin Ali Ahmed

Personal details
- Born: 17 August 1920 Tirupattur, Madras Presidency, British India (now Tirupattur district, Tamil Nadu, India)
- Died: 15 October 2009 Anna Nagar, Chennai, Tamil Nadu, India.

Justice A.Varadarajan (1920-2009) was a judge of Supreme Court of India.

== Early life ==
A. Varadarajan was born into a Scheduled Caste family at Jolarpettai, Vellore district, Madras Presidency. He was inspired by Iyothee Thass, a pioneer in Dalit activism, during his youth days. He did his matriculation from Municipal High School at Tirupattur, intermediate from Voorhees College, (Vellore), B.A. from Loyola College (Madras) and LLB from Dr. Ambedkar Government Law College (Madras).

== Career ==
In 1944 he was enrolled as a lawyer and practised in civil and criminal matters on the original and appellate sides. Later he got promoted as Sub-Judge, District and Sessions Judge, Additional Judge and Permanent Judge in 1974.

In 1980 he was nominated as a judge of the Supreme Court of India, being the first Dalit to reach such position.

Varadarajan retired in 1985 and joined Prakash Ambedkar in his efforts for implementing reservations and seeking actions against violence on Dalits.
