= Sambhunath Banerjee =

Sambhunath Banerjee (1888 – 13 July 1977) was a Bengali Indian scholar of law, judge of the Calcutta High Court, and Vice Chancellor of the University of Calcutta.

He was educated at the renowned Scottish Church College in Calcutta, and at the University of Calcutta.

He would serve as the Vice Chancellor of the University of Calcutta from 11 May 1950 – 11 April 1954.

He was awarded an honorary Doctor of Law by the University of Calcutta on 26 December 1952.
