= Surajit Chandra Lahiri =

Indian judge

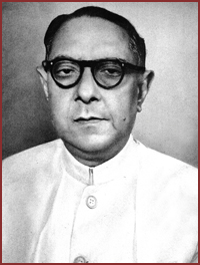
Surajit Chandra Lahiri

Surajit Chandra Lahiri was an Indian judge and former Chief Justice of the Calcutta High Court.

== Career ==
Lahiri passed M.A. LL.B. and practiced in the Calcutta High Court. He became judge of the High Court and was also appointed Chief Justice of the High Court on 17 August 1959 after Justice Kulada Charan Das Gupta was appointed judge of the Supreme Court of India. Lahiri retired on 7 June 1961 from the post. He also served as the vice chancellor of the University of Calcutta from 11 January 1962 to 31 October 1962.
