= Ganendra Narayan Ray =

Indian judge (1933–2026))

Hon'ble Justice Ganendra Narayan Ray

Chairman of Press Council of India
- In office 11 March 2005 – 4 October 2011
- Appointed by: Central Government of India
- Preceded by: K. Jayachandra Reddy
- Succeeded by: Markandey Katju

Judge of Supreme Court of India
- In office 7 October 1991 – 30 April 1998
- Nominated by: Ranganath Misra
- Appointed by: R. Venkataraman

11th Chief Justice of Gujarat High Court
- In office 2 December 1990 – 6 October 1991
- Nominated by: Ranganath Misra
- Appointed by: R. Venkataraman
- Preceded by: P. R. Gokulakrishnan; R. C. Mankad (acting)
- Succeeded by: S. N. Sundaram; R. C. Mankad (acting); S. B. Majmudar (acting)

Judge of Calcutta High Court
- In office 23 December 1976 – 1 December 1990
- Nominated by: Ajit Nath Ray
- Appointed by: Fakhruddin Ali Ahmed

Personal details
- Born: 1 May 1933
- Died: 19 September 2026 (aged 93) Salt Lake, Kolkata, West Bengal
- Spouse: Gargi Ray
- Children: Deeptendra Narayan Ray
- Education: Presidency College, Calcutta, Scottish Church College (B.Sc), University of Calcutta (LL.B)

Ganendra Narayan Ray (born 1 May 1933) was a Bengali Indian jurist and a former judge of the Supreme Court of India who also served as Chief Justice of the Gujarat High Court and Chairman of the Press Council of India. who served as the chief justice of the Gujarat High Court.

== Early life and family background ==
Ray came from a family with historical roots in Lalgola, in West Bengal’s Murshidabad district. He was descended on his maternal side from a zamindar family associated with the region. His early education took place at Mahendra Narayan Academy, a school established by his great-grandfather. He initially considered joining the Indian Administrative Service. His eventual decision to pursue law reportedly followed advice from K. N. Katju, who had served as Governor and later became a Union minister. Katju was acquainted with Ray’s grandfather through their legal connections in the Allahabad High Court.

Ray completed his Intermediate in Science at Presidency College and earned a Bachelor of Science degree in economics from Scottish Church College, Calcutta. After postgraduate studies, he joined the law department of Calcutta University. He subsequently enrolled as an advocate of the Calcutta High Court on 31 July 1958.

== Career ==
Ray practised in both civil and criminal matters. In 1973, he became a Junior Government Advocate for West Bengal and later served as Junior Standing Counsel for the state government. He was subsequently selected for the Central Government’s panel of senior counsel before the Calcutta High Court. He was appointed an Additional Judge of the Calcutta High Court on 23 December 1976 and became permanent on 24 November 1977.

Ray was appointed Chief Justice of the Gujarat High Court on 2 December 1990. He held the office until his elevation to the Supreme Court of India in 1991, where he continued serving until his retirement on 30 April 1998.

=== Post retirement ===
After retiring from the Supreme Court in 1998, he remained active in public life. He headed an inquiry into the 1999 Gaisal train accident and chaired the West Bengal commission concerned with Other Backward Classes from 20 January 2000 to 19 January 2003. From 2005 to 2011, he served two consecutive terms as Chairman of the Press Council of India, where he raised concerns about sensationalism and commercial pressures on journalism and advocated greater accountability in the media. He was also closely involved in the civic and cultural life of Salt Lake near Kolkata, leading residents’ and welfare organisations and supporting educational and cultural initiatives. His post-retirement years thus combined public inquiries, media regulation and community service.

== Personal life and death ==
His interests extended to music and cultural activities. He admired sitar maestros Pandit Ravi Shankar and Pandit Nikhil Banerjee, and briefly attempted to learn the sitar himself. He enjoyed devotional music and Bengali television music competitions. He hosted musical gatherings at home and continued to participate in community events in his later years.

Ray died on 19 September 2026, at the age of 93. His final years were spent in Kolkata, where he remained connected to family, friends and local civic life. Ray was survived by his wife, Gargi, and his daughter, Suchetana Mukherjee, and son Deeptendra Narayan ray. Suchetana is a doctor associated with Sankara Nethralaya in New Town. His son, Justice Deeptendra Narayan Ray, followed a legal career and was appointed a judge of the Gujarat High Court on 10 October 2024. During his father's tenure on the Supreme Court, Deeptendra continued practising in Gujarat as Ray had preferred that his son not practise at the Bar in Delhi while he himself was serving on the Supreme Court. Deeptendra moved to Delhi after his father's retirement before continuing his career in the legal profession.
