= Anil Kumar Sen =

Indian judge

Anil Kumar Sen was a Bengali Indian jurist, who served as chief justice of the Calcutta High Court.

He was educated at the Scottish Church College, and at the University of Calcutta.

He served as a chief justice of the Calcutta High Court in 1986.
