= Amarendra Nath Sen =

Bengali Indian jurist

Amarendra Nath Sen (born 1 October 1920) was a Bengali Indian jurist, who served as the chief justice of the Calcutta High Court in 1979 and as a judge in the Supreme Court of India. His grandfather Baikuntha Nath Sen was a notable political leader and prominent lawyer of Bengal.

== Early life and education ==
Born on 1 October 1920, he studied at the Saidabad Hardinge H.E. School in Murshidabad, the Krishnath College in Berhampore, the Scottish Church College and the Hazra Law College of the University of Calcutta. Subsequently, he passed his Barrister-at-Law examinations from the Inner Temple in London.

== Career ==
He had started out as an advocate at the Calcutta High Court in January 1947 prior to independence. He dealt with mainly civil cases in the Calcutta High Court. He was appointed an additional judge, and later a permanent judge of that high court in 1966. He was appointed the chief justice of the Calcutta High Court in December 1979. He was appointed a judge in the Supreme Court of India in January 1981. He retired in September 1985.
