= Calcutta High Court =

High Court in West Bengal, India

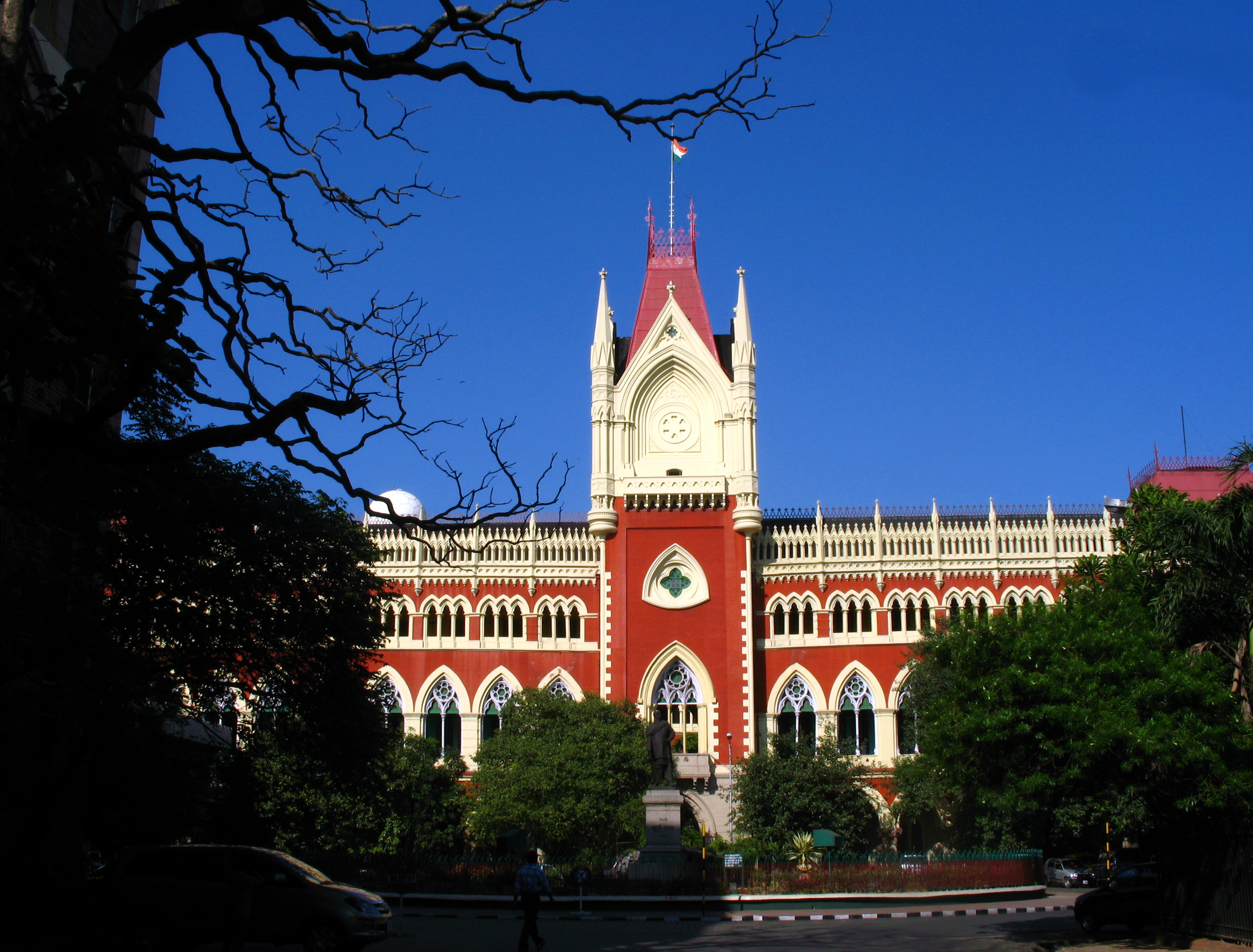
- Calcutta High Court building
- Interactive map of Calcutta High Court
- 22°34′6″N 88°20′36″E
- Established: 1 July 1862; 164 years ago
- Jurisdiction: West Bengal and Andaman & Nicobar Islands
- Location: Principal Seat: Kolkata, West Bengal; Circuit Benches: Jalpaiguri & Port Blair (A & N Islands)
- Coordinates: 22°34′6″N 88°20′36″E
- Composition method: Presidential with confirmation of Chief Justice of India and Governor of respective state.
- Authorised by: Constitution of India
- Judge term length: Till 62 years of age
- Number of positions: 72
- Website: calcuttahighcourt.gov.in

Chief Justice
- Currently: Ravindra Vithalrao Ghuge
- Since: 9 September 2026

Calcutta High Court is the oldest High Court in India. It is located at Justice Radhabinod Pal Sarani, formerly Esplanade Row West, Kolkata (also scribed as Calcutta), West Bengal. It has jurisdiction over the state of West Bengal and the Union Territory of the Andaman and Nicobar Islands. The Gothic Revival building was completed in 1872, and designed by Walter Long Bozzi Granville.

Currently, the court has a sanctioned judge strength of 72.

== History ==
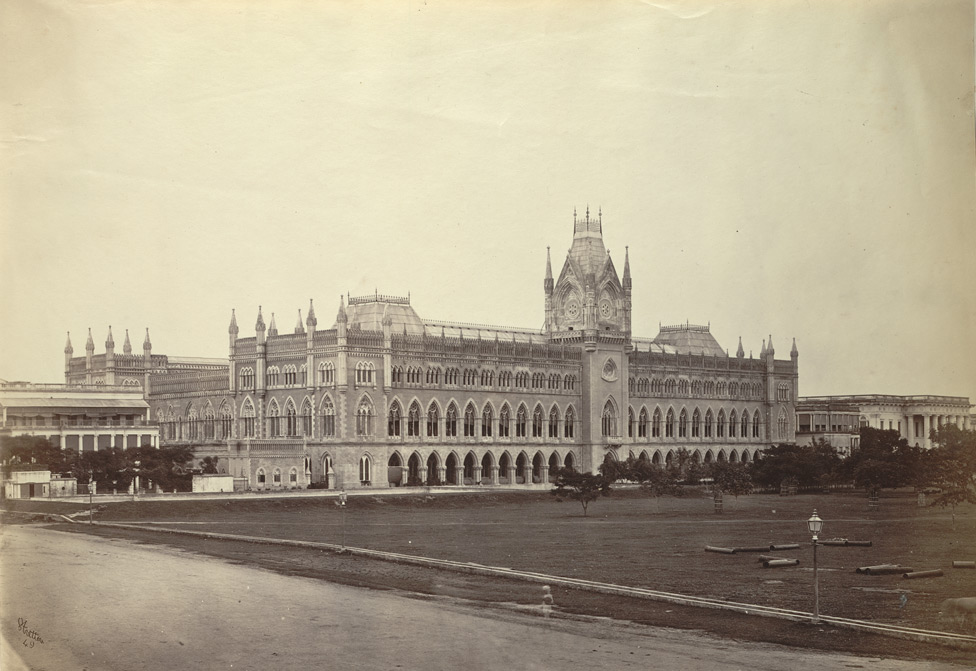
Calcutta High Court in the 1860s

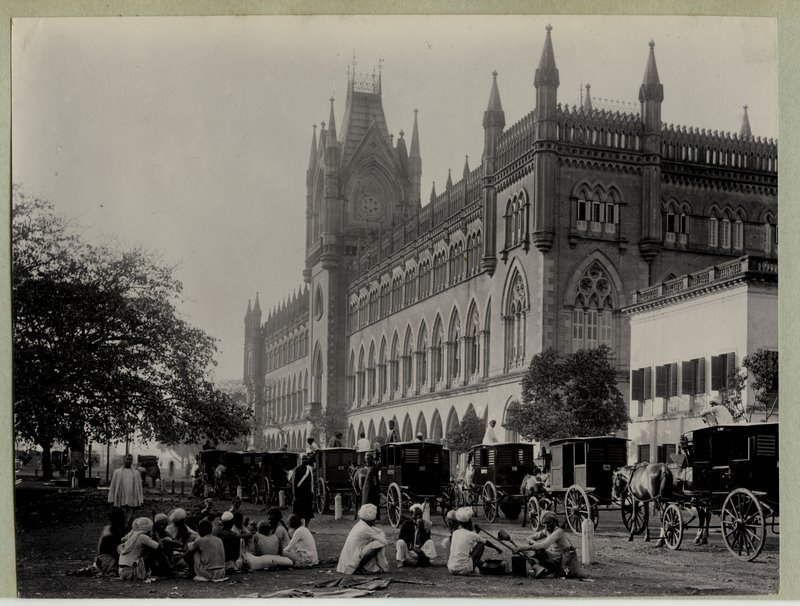
Calcutta High Court in the 1890s

The Calcutta High Court is one of the three High Courts in India established at the Presidency Towns by Letters patent granted by Queen Victoria, and is the oldest High Court in India. It was brought into existence as the High Court of Judicature at Fort William by the Letters Patent dated 14 May 1862, issued under the High Courts Act, 1861, which was preceded by the Supreme Court of Judicature at Fort William. The court was formally opened on 1 July 1862.

The building was designed by Walter Long Bozzi Granville, and loosely modelled on the Ypres Cloth Hall in Flanders, Belgium, with a similar long facade of serried Gothic pointed arches, and a tall central tower with corner spires. It is constructed of red brick with stucco dressings above a vaulted cloister of Barakur sandstone. It has been described as the only significant secular Gothic building in the city, something of an aberration amid the neoclassical edifices of other government buildings, such as Granville's own earlier General Post Office building in Dalhousie Square.

Despite the name of the city having officially changed from Calcutta to Kolkata in 2001, the Court, as an institution retained the old name. The bill to rename it as Kolkata High Court was approved by the Union Cabinet on 5 July 2016 along with the renaming of its two other counterparts in Chennai and Mumbai. The Bill called High Courts (Alteration of Names) Bill was introduced in the Lok Sabha on 19 July 2016 and is yet to be passed by both Houses of Parliament. Hence, the High Court still retains the old name.

== Principal seat and benches ==
The seat of the Calcutta High Court is Kolkata, the capital of West Bengal. As per the Calcutta High Court (Extension of Jurisdiction) Act, 1953, the Calcutta High Court's jurisdiction was extended to cover Chandernagore (now called Chandannagar) and the Andaman and Nicobar Islands as of 2 May 1950. The Calcutta High Court extended its Circuit Bench in Port Blair, the capital of the Andaman and Nicobar Islands and in Jalpaiguri, the divisional headquarters of the North Bengal region. On 7 February 2019, President Ram Nath Kovind finalised the opening of the other circuit bench in Jalpaiguri, West Bengal with the jurisdiction area within 5 districts- Darjeeling, Kalimpong, Jalpaiguri, Alipurduar and Cooch Behar.

== Chief Justice and Judges ==
The court has a Sanctioned strength of 72 (Permanent:54, Additional:18) judges.

=== Sitting Judges of Calcutta High Court ===
Currently, Justice Ravindra Vithalrao Ghuge is the Chief Justice of the court. Sir Barnes Peacock was the first Chief Justice of the High Court. He assumed the charge when the court was founded on 1 July 1862. Sir Romesh Chandra Mitra was the first officiating Indian Chief Justice and Phani Bhushan Chakravartti was the first permanent Indian Chief Justice of the court. The longest-serving Chief Justice was Justice Sankar Prasad Mitra.

== List ==
The court's first judges were

- Sir Elijah Impey, Chief justice from 1774 to 1783 on his recall to England for impeachment.
- Stephen Caesar Le Maistre, Puisne judge from 1774 to 1777 on his death.
- John Hyde (judge), Puisne judge from 1774 to 1796 on his death.
- Robert Chambers, Puisne judge from 1774 to 1783, Acting Chief Justice from 1783 to 1791. Chief Justice from 1791-1798, on his resignation.
- Sir William Jones, Puisne judge from 1783 to 1794 on his death.
- Sir William Dunkin, Puisne judge from August 14, 1791 to unknown.

=== Chief Justices ===
| Chief Justice | Term | Notes |
|---|---|---|
| Sir Elijah Impey | 16 March 1774–1791 | Recalled 1783 |
| Sir Robert Chambers | 1791–1 Aug 1798 | previously Acting Chief Justice 1783–1791 |
| Sir John Anstruther, Bt | 1798–22 Feb 1806 | |
| Sir Henry Russell | 1807–9 Nov 1813 | |
| Sir Edward Hyde East | 1813–July 1822 | |
| Sir Robert Henry Blosset | 1822–1 Feb 1823 | (died in office) |
| Sir Christopher Puller | 1823–26 May 1824 | (died in office) |
| Sir Charles Grey | 1825–1832 | |
| Sir William O. Russell | 22 Feb 1832–1833 | (died in office) |
| Sir Edward Ryan | 1833–1842 | |
| Sir Lawrence Peel | 1842–1855 | |
| Sir James William Colvile | 1855–1859 | |
| Sir Barnes Peacock | 1859–1862 | afterwards Chief Justice of the High Court of Calcutta |

=== Justices ===
| Puisne judge | Term | Notes |
|---|---|---|
| Stephen Caesar Le Maistre | 22 October 1774–4 Nov 1777 | Died |
| John Hyde | 22 October 1774–8 July 1796 | Died |
| William Jones | 22 Oct 1783–27 Apr 1791 | Died |
| William Dunkin | 3 Sept 1791–1 Aug 1797 | Resigned |
| James Watson | 1 Mar 1796–2 May 1796 | Died |
| John Royds | 23 Oct 1797–24 Sept 1817 | Died |
| William Burroughs | 3 Nov 1806–20 Dec 1815 | Resigned |
| Francis Workman-Macnaghten | 1 Mar 1816–2 Mar 1825 | Resigned |
| Anthony Buller | 26 Sept 1816–1 Jan 1827 | Resigned |
| John Franks | 6 Oct 1825–15 Mar 1831 | Resigned |
| John Peter Grant | 17 Oct 1833–1848 | |
| Benjamin Heath Malkin | 6 Oct 1835–21 Oct 1837 | Died |

== List of Chief Justices ==
| # | Portrait | Chief Justice | Term |
|---|---|---|---|
| 1 | | Sir Barnes Peacock | 1862–1870 |
| 2 | | Sir Richard Couch | 1870–1875 |
| 3 | | Sir Richard Garth | 1875–1886 |
| — | | Sir Romesh Chandra Mitra (acting) | 1886 |
| 4 | | Sir William Comer Petheram | 1886–1896 |
| 5 | | Sir Francis William Maclean | 1896–1909 |
| — | | Sir Chunder Madhub Ghose (acting) | 1906 |
| 6 | | Sir Lawrence Hugh Jenkins | 1909–1915 |
| 7 | | Sir Lancelot Sanderson | 1915–1926 |
| — | | Sir Ashutosh Mukherjee (acting) | 1920, 1923 |
| 8 | | Sir George Claus Rankin | 1926–1934 |
| 9 | | Sir Harold Derbyshire | 1934–1946 |
| 10 | | Sir Arthur Trevor Harries | 1946–1952 |
After Indian Independence
| 11 | | Phani Bhusan Chakravartti | 1952–1958 |
| 12 | | Kulada Charan Das Gupta | 1958–1959 |
| 13 | | Surajit Chandra Lahiri | 1959–1961 |
| 14 | | Himansu Kumar Bose | 1961–1966 |
| 15 | | Deep Narayan Sinha | 1966–1970 |
| 16 | | Prasanta Bihari Mukharji | 1970–1972 |
| 17 | | Sankar Prasad Mitra | 1972–1979 |
| 18 | | Amarendra Nath Sen | 1979–1981 |
| 19 | | Sambhu Chandra Ghose | 1981–1983 |
| 20 | | Samarendra Chandra Deb | January 1983 – February 1983 |
| 21 | | Satish Chandra | 1983–1986 |
| 22 | | Anil Kumar Sen | September 1986 – October 1986 |
| 23 | | Chittatosh Mookerjee | 1 November 1986 – 1 November 1987 |
| 24 | | Debi Singh Tewatia | 1 November 1987 – 1988 |
| 25 | | Prabodh Dinkarrao Desai | 1988–1991 |
| 26 | | Nagendra Prasad Singh | 4 February 1992 – 14 June 1992 |
| 27 | | Anandamoy Bhattacharjee | 1992–1994 |
| 28 | | Krishna Chandra Agarwal | 1994–1996 |
| 29 | V. N. Khare | V. N. Khare | 2 February 1996 – 20 March 1997 |
| 30 | | Prabha Shankar Mishra | 1997–1998 |
| 31 | | Ashok Kumar Mathur | 22 December 1999 – 6 June 2004 |
| 32 | | V. S. Sirpurkar | 20 March 2005 – 11 January 2007 |
| 33 | | Surinder Singh Nijjar | 8 March 2007 – 16 November 2009 |
| 34 | | Mohit Shantilal Shah | 24 December 2009 – 25 June 2010 |
| 35 | | Jai Narayan Patel | 2010 – 4 October 2012 |
| 36 | | Arun Kumar Mishra | 14 December 2012 – 6 July 2014 |
| 37 | | Manjula Chellur | 5 August 2014 – 21 August 2016 |
| 38 | | Girish Chandra Gupta | 21 September 2016 – 30 November 2016 |
| 39 | | Jyotirmay Bhattacharya | 1 May 2018 – 24 September 2018 |
| 40 | | Debasish Kar Gupta | 30 October 2018 – 31 December 2018 |
| 41 | | Thottathil B. Radhakrishnan | 4 April 2019 — 28 April 2021 |
| 42 | | Prakash Shrivastava | 11 October 2021 — 30 March 2023 |
| 43 | | T. S. Sivagnanam | 11 May 2023 — 15 September 2025 |
| 44 | | Sujoy Paul | 16 January 2026 – 20 June 2026 |
| 45 | | Ravindra Vithalrao Ghuge | 9 September 2026 – Incumbent |

== Judges elevated as Chief Justices ==
This sections contains list of only those judges elevated as chief justices whose parent high court is Calcutta. This includes those judges who, at the time of appointment as chief justice, may not be serving in Calcutta High Court but this list does not include judges who at the time of appointment as chief justice were serving in Calcutta High Court but does not have Calcutta as their Parent High Court.

Colour Key

- Female Chief Justice
- Served as Chief Justice of India

Symbol Key

- ^{‡} Elevated to Supreme Court of India
- ^{RES} Resigned
- ^{†} Died in office

| Name | Image | Appointed as CJ in HC of | Date of appointment | | Date of retirement (Note: this includes date of resignation, death and elevation to supreme court) | Tenure | | Ref.. |
| Name | Image | Appointed as CJ in HC of | As Judge | As Chief Justice | Date of retirement | As Chief Justice | As Judge (Note: also includes tenure as Chief Justice) | Ref.. |
|---|---|---|---|---|---|---|---|---|
| Walter Morgan | | Allahabad, transferred to Madras | 1 July 1862 | 17 March 1866 | 7 February 1879 | 12 years, 328 days | 16 years, 222 days | |
| Lawrence Hugh Jenkins | | Bombay, transferred to Calcutta | 24 April 1896 | 20 April 1899 | 13 November 1915 | 16 years, 208 days | 19 years, 204 days | |
| John Stanley | | Allahabad | November 1898 | 17 August 1901 | 21 April 1911 | 9 years, 248 days | | |
| George Claus Rankin | | Calcutta | 1918 | 1926 | 1934 | | | |
| Sarat Kumar Ghosh | | Jammu & Kashmir, transferred to Rajasthan (Note: Then known as High Court of princely state of Jaipur) | September 1929 | 29 March 1946 | 31 March 1949^{[RES]} | 3 years, 3 days | | |
| Ronald Francis Lodge | | Gauhati | 17 November 1938 | 5 April 1948 | 7 April 1949^{[RES]} | 1 year, 3 days | 10 years, 142 days | |
| Sudhi Ranjan Das | | Punjab & Haryana | 1 December 1942 | 19 January 1949 | 20 January 1950^{[‡]} (Note: Then Federal Court of India) | 1 year, 2 days | 7 years, 50 days | |
| Phani Bhusan Chakravartti | | Calcutta | April 1945 | 13 June 1952 | 11 October 1958 | 6 years, 121 days | | |
| Kulada Charan Das Gupta | | Calcutta | June 1948 | 12 October 1958 | 17 August 1959^{[‡]} | 310 days | | |
| Surajit Chandra Lahiri | | Calcutta | 3 January 1949 | 17 August 1959 | 10 June 1961 | 1 year, 298 days | 12 years, 159 days | |
| Prasanta Bihari Mukharji | | Calcutta | 3 January 1949 | 20 May 1970 | 30 July 1972 | 2 years, 72 days | 23 years, 210 days | |
| Subodh Ranjan Das Gupta | | Karnataka | 3 January 1949 | 25 July 1957 | 13 August 1961 | 4 years, 20 days | 12 years, 223 days | |
| Himansu Kumar Bose | | Calcutta | 8 December 1949 | 10 June 1961 | 1 March 1966 | 4 years, 265 days | 16 years, 84 days | |
| Deep Narayan Sinha | | Calcutta | 3 July 1950 | 1 March 1966 | 14 January 1970 | 3 years, 320 days | 19 years, 196 days | |
| Sankar Prasad Mitra | | Calcutta | 23 December 1957 | 30 July 1972 | 25 December 1979 | 7 years, 149 days | 22 years, 3 days | |
| Amarendra Nath Sen | | Calcutta | 15 November 1965 | 26 December 1979 | 27 January 1981^{[‡]} | 1 year, 33 days | 15 years, 74 days | |
| Sambhu Chandra Ghose | | Calcutta | 25 July 1966 | 28 January 1981 | 31 December 1982 | 1 year, 338 days | 16 years, 160 days | |
| Samarendra Chandra Deb | | Calcutta | 27 February 1968 | 1 January 1983 | 28 February 1983 | 59 days | 15 years, 2 days | |
| Pradyot Kumar Banerjee | | Rajasthan | 31 July 1968 | 23 October 1983 | 30 September 1985 | 1 year, 343 days | 17 years, 62 days | |
| Anil Kumar Sen | | Calcutta | 8 November 1968 | 1 September 1986 | 31 October 1986 | 61 days | 17 years, 358 days | |
| Chittatosh Mookerjee | | Calcutta, transferred to Bombay | 2 April 1969 | 1 November 1986 | 1 January 1991 | 4 years, 62 days | 21 years, 275 days | |
| Dipak Kumar Sen | | Patna | 5 March 1973 | 1 May 1988 | 1 May 1989 | 1 year, 1 day | 16 years, 58 days | |
| Rabindranath Pyne | | Delhi | 6 March 1974 | 20 May 1988 | 28 September 1990 | 2 years, 132 days | 16 years, 207 days | |
| Bimal Chandra Basak | | Patna | 10 June 1974 | 18 March 1991 | 21 January 1994 | 2 years, 310 days | 19 years, 226 days | |
| Ganendra Narayan Ray | | Gujarat | 23 December 1976 | 2 December 1990 | 6 October 1991^{[‡]} | 309 days | 14 years, 288 days | |
| Manoj Kumar Mukherjee | | Allahabad, transferred to Bombay | 17 June 1977 | 12 November 1991 | 14 December 1993^{[‡]} | 2 years, 33 days | 16 years, 180 days | |
| Mukul Gopal Mukherjee | | Rajasthan | 9 January 1984 | 19 September 1996 | 24 December 1997 | 1 year, 97 days | 13 years, 350 days | |
| Umesh Chandra Banerjee | | Andhra Pradesh | 9 January 1984 | 1 February 1998 | 8 December 1998^{[‡]} | 311 days | 14 years, 334 days | |
| Nirendra Krishna Mitra | | Allahabad | 20 December 1985 | 12 February 1999 | 17 April 2000 | 1 year, 66 days | 14 years, 120 days | |
| Shyamal Kumar Sen | | Allahabad | 17 January 1986 | 18 July 2000 | 24 November 2002 | 2 years, 130 days | 16 years, 312 days | |
| Tarun Chatterjee | | Allahabad | 6 August 1990 | 31 January 2003 | 26 August 2004^{[‡]} | 1 year, 209 days | 14 years, 21 days | |
| Ajoy Nath Ray | | Allahabad, transferred to Sikkim | 6 August 1990 | 11 January 2005 | 30 October 2008 | 3 years, 294 days | 18 years, 86 days | |
| Altamas Kabir | | Jharkhand | 6 August 1990 | 1 March 2005 | 8 September 2005^{[‡]} | 192 days | 15 years, 34 days | |
| Asok Kumar Ganguly | | Orissa, transferred to Madras | 10 January 1994 | 2 March 2007 | 15 December 2008^{[‡]} | 1 year, 289 days | 14 years, 342 days | |
| Barin Ghosh | | Jammu & Kashmir, transferred to Sikkim then to Uttarakhand | 14 July 1995 | 3 January 2009 | 4 June 2014 | 5 years, 153 days | 18 years, 326 days | |
| Bhaskar Bhattacharya | | Gujarat | 17 July 1997 | 21 July 2012 | 28 September 2014 | 2 years, 70 days | 17 years, 74 days | |
| Pinaki Chandra Ghose | | Andhra Pradesh | 17 July 1997 | 12 December 2012 | 7 March 2013^{[‡]} | 86 days | 15 years, 234 days | |
| Kalyan Jyoti Sengupta | | Andhra Pradesh | 17 July 1997 | 21 May 2013 | 6 May 2015 | 1 year, 351 days | 17 years, 294 days | |
| Subhro Kamal Mukherjee | | Karnataka | 15 September 2000 | 23 February 2016 | 9 October 2017 | 1 year, 229 days | 17 years, 25 days | |
| Girish Chandra Gupta | | Calcutta | 15 September 2000 | 21 September 2016 | 30 November 2016 | 71 days | 16 years, 77 days | |
| Indira Banerjee | | Madras | 5 February 2002 | 5 April 2017 | 6 August 2018^{[‡]} | 1 year, 124 days | 16 years, 183 days | |
| Jyotirmay Bhattacharya | | Calcutta | 3 December 2003 | 1 May 2018 | 24 September 2018 | 147 days | 14 years, 296 days | |
| Aniruddha Bose | | Jharkhand | 19 January 2004 | 11 August 2018 | 23 May 2019^{[‡]} | 286 days | 15 years, 125 days | |
| Debasish Kar Gupta | | Calcutta | 22 June 2006 | 30 October 2018 | 31 December 2018 | 63 days | 12 years, 193 days | |
| Biswanath Somadder | | Meghalaya, transferred to Sikkim | 22 June 2006 | 27 April 2020 | 14 December 2025 | 5 years, 232 days | 19 years, 176 days | |
| Dipankar Datta | | Bombay | 22 June 2006 | 28 April 2020 | 11 December 2022^{[‡]} | 2 years, 228 days | 16 years, 172 days | |
| Sanjib Banerjee | | Madras, transferred to Meghalaya | 22 June 2006 | 4 January 2021 | 1 November 2023 | 1 year, 343 days | 17 years, 133 days | |
| Indra Prasanna Mukerji | | Meghalaya | 18 May 2009 | 3 October 2024 | 5 September 2025 | 338 days | 16 years, 111 days | |
| Harish Tandon | | Orissa | 13 April 2010 | 26 March 2025 | 15 November 2026 | 1 year, 235 days | 16 years, 217 days | |
| Soumen Sen | | Meghalaya, transferred to Kerala | 13 April 2011 | 8 October 2025 | Incumbent | 1 year, 39 days | 15 years, 217 days | |

=== Judges appointed as Acting Chief Justice ===
| Name | Appointed as ACJ in HC of | Date of appointment as Judge | Period as Acting Chief Justice | Date of retirement | Tenure as ACJ | Tenure as Judge | Remarks | Ref.. |
|---|---|---|---|---|---|---|---|---|
| P. B. Mukharji | Calcutta | 3 January 1949 | 14 Jan 1970 – 19 May 1970 | 30 July 1972 | 126 days | 23 years, 210 days | Became permanent | |
| S. Mukharji | Calcutta | 31 July 1968 | 1 Mar 1983 – 14 Mar 1983 | 14 March 1983^{[‡]} | 14 days | 14 years, 227 days | Elevated to Supreme Court | |
| Tarun Kumar Basu | Calcutta | 31 July 1968 | 15 Mar 1983 – 28 Nov 1983 | 1 February 1986 | 259 days | 17 years, 186 days | -- | |
| Rabindranath Pyne | Calcutta | 6 March 1974 | 3 May 1988 – 19 May 1988 | 8 October 1990 | 17 days | 16 years, 217 days | Elevated as CJ of Delhi | |
| Manashnath Roy | Calcutta | 10 June 1974 | 20 May 1988 – 13 Nov 1988 | 11 November 1990 | 178 days | 16 years, 155 days | -- | |
| Samir Kumar Mookherjee | Calcutta | 9 January 1984 | 21 Mar 1997 – 27 Oct 1997 | 29 April 1999 | 221 days | 15 years, 111 days | -- | |
| Samir Kumar Mookherjee | Calcutta | 9 January 1984 | 6 Jul 1998 – 29 Apr 1999 | 29 April 1999 | 298 days | 15 years, 111 days | Retired as ACJ | |
| Susanta Chatterjee | Orissa | 17 January 1986 | 16 Feb 1996 – 1 Aug 1996 | 1 April 1999 | 168 days | 13 years, 75 days | -- | |
| Susanta Chatterjee | Orissa | 17 January 1986 | 28 Jan 1999 – 1 Apr 1999 | 1 April 1999 | 64 days | 13 years, 75 days | Retired as ACJ | |
| S. K. Sen | Calcutta | 17 January 1986 | 29 Apr 1999 – 17 May 1999 | 24 November 2002 | 19 days | 16 years, 312 days | Appointed as Acting Governor of West Bengal | |
| S. K. Sen | Calcutta | 17 January 1986 | 5 Dec 1999 – 21 Dec 1999 | 24 November 2002 | 17 days | 16 years, 312 days | -- | |
| S. K. Sen | Allahabad | 17 January 1986 | 8 May 2000 – 17 Jul 2000 | 24 November 2002 | 71 days | 16 years, 312 days | Became permanent | |
| A. N. Ray | Calcutta | 6 August 1990 | 7 Jun 2004 – 10 Jan 2005 | 30 October 2008 | 218 days | 18 years, 86 days | Elevated as CJ of Allahabad | |
| A. Kabir | Calcutta | 6 August 1990 | 11 Jan 2005 – 28 Feb 2005 | 8 September 2005^{[‡]} | 49 days | 15 years, 34 days | Elevated as CJ of Jharkhand | |
| A. K. Ganguly | Calcutta | 10 January 1994 | 1 Mar 2005 – 19 Mar 2005 | 15 December 2008^{[‡]} | 19 days | 14 years, 342 days | -- | |
| A. K. Ganguly | Orissa | 10 January 1994 | 28 Jan 2007 – 1 Mar 2007 | 15 December 2008^{[‡]} | 33 days | 14 years, 342 days | Became permanent | |
| Malay Sengupta | Sikkim | 27 September 1995 | 27 Oct 1996 – 26 Aug 1997 | 9 November 1998 | 304 days | 3 years, 44 days | -- | |
| Malay Sengupta | Sikkim | 27 September 1995 | 27 Sep 1997 – 26 Dec 1997 | 9 November 1998 | 91 days | 3 years, 44 days | -- | |
| Amitava Lala | Allahabad | 12 May 1997 | 8 Feb 2010 – 25 Jun 2010 | 19 November 2012 | 138 days | 15 years, 192 days | -- | |
| Amitava Lala | Allahabad | 12 May 1997 | 31 Jul 2011 – 4 Aug 2011 | 19 November 2012 | 5 days | 15 years, 192 days | -- | |
| Amitava Lala | Allahabad | 12 May 1997 | 8 Aug 2012 – 19 Nov 2012 | 19 November 2012 | 104 days | 15 years, 192 days | Retired as ACJ | |
| B. Bhattacharya | Calcutta | 17 July 1997 | 12 Jan 2007 – 6 Mar 2007 | 28 September 2014 | 54 days | 17 years, 74 days | -- | |
| B. Bhattacharya | Calcutta | 17 July 1997 | 17 Nov 2009 – 23 Dec 2009 | 28 September 2014 | 37 days | 17 years, 74 days | -- | |
| B. Bhattacharya | Gujarat | 17 July 1997 | 8 Nov 2011 – 20 Jul 2012 | 28 September 2014 | 256 days | 17 years, 74 days | Became permanent | |
| P. C. Ghose | Andhra Pradesh | 17 July 1997 | 25 Jun 2012 – 11 Dec 2012 | 7 March 2013^{[‡]} | 170 days | 15 years, 234 days | Became permanent | |
| K. J. Sengupta | Calcutta | 17 July 1997 | 5 Oct 2012 – 30 Oct 2012 | 6 May 2015 | 26 days | 17 years, 294 days | Transferred to Uttarakhand | |
| Pratap Kumar Ray | Calcutta | 15 September 2000 | 31 Oct 2012 – 14 Dec 2012 | 8 January 2013 | 45 days | 12 years, 116 days | -- | |
| Ashim Kumar Banerjee | Calcutta | 15 September 2000 | 7 Jul 2014 – 5 Aug 2014 | 1 June 2015 | 30 days | 14 years, 260 days | -- | |
| S. K. Mukherjee | Karnataka | 15 September 2000 | 4 Jun 2015 – 22 Feb 2016 | 9 October 2017 | 264 days | 17 years, 25 days | Became permanent | |
| G. C. Gupta | Calcutta | 15 September 2000 | 22 Aug 2016 – 20 Sep 2016 | 30 November 2016 | 30 days | 16 years, 77 days | Became permanent | |
| J. M. Bhattacharya | Calcutta | 3 December 2003 | 25 Oct 2017 – 30 Apr 2018 | 24 September 2018 | 188 days | 14 years, 296 days | Became permanent | |
| D. K. Gupta | Calcutta | 22 June 2006 | 25 Sep 2018 – 29 Oct 2018 | 31 December 2018 | 35 days | 12 years, 193 days | Became permanent | |
| Biswanath Somadder | Calcutta | 22 June 2006 | 1 Jan 2019 – 3 Apr 2019 | 14 December 2025 | 93 days | 19 years, 176 days | -- | |
| Soumen Sen | Calcutta | 13 April 2011 | 8 Oct 2025 – 15 Jan 2026 | Incumbent | 22 days | 15 years, 217 days | Elevated as CJ of Meghalaya | |
| T. Chakraborty | Calcutta | 30 October 2013 | 21 Jun 2026 – 8 Sep 2026 | Incumbent | 80 days | 13 years, 17 days | -- | |
| Arindam Sinha | Orissa | 30 October 2013 | 20 Jan 2025 – 25 Mar 2025 | Incumbent | 65 days | 13 years, 17 days | -- | |

== Judges elevated to Supreme Court ==
This section includes the list of only those judges whose parent high court was Calcutta. This includes those judges who, at the time of elevation to Supreme Court of India, may not be serving in Calcutta High Court but this list does not include judges who at the time of elevation were serving in Calcutta High Court but does not have Calcutta as their Parent High Court.

Colour Key

- Female Judge
- Served as Chief Justice of India

Key

- ^{RES} Resigned
- ^{†} Died in office

| # | Name of the Judge | Image | Date of Appointment | | Date of Retirement | Tenure | | | Immediately preceding office |
| # | Name of the Judge | Image | In Parent High Court | In Supreme Court | Date of Retirement | In High Court(s) | In Supreme Court | Total tenure (Note: Includes both tenure as High Court Judge as well as Supreme Court Judge) | Immediately preceding office |
|---|---|---|---|---|---|---|---|---|---|
| 1 | Bijan Kumar Mukherjea | | 8 July 1936 | 13 October 1948 (Note: Elevated to the Federal Court of India on 13 October 1948, and became part of the Supreme Court of India after its establishment on 26 January 1950.) | 31 January 1956 | 12 years, 98 days | 7 years, 111 days | 19 years, 208 days | Judge of Calcutta HC |
| 2 | Sudhi Ranjan Das | | 1 December 1942 | 20 January 1950 (Note: Elevated to the Federal Court of India on 20 January 1950, and became part of the Supreme Court of India after its establishment on 26 January 1950.) | 30 September 1959 | 7 years, 50 days | 9 years, 254 days | 16 years, 304 days | 2nd CJ of Punjab & Haryana HC |
| 3 | Amal Kumar Sarkar | | 25 January 1949 | 4 March 1957 | 29 June 1966 | 8 years, 38 days | 9 years, 118 days | 17 years, 156 days | Judge of Calcutta HC |
| 4 | Kulada Charan Das Gupta | | June 1948 | 24 August 1959 | 2 January 1965 | | 5 years, 132 days | | 12th CJ of Calcutta HC |
| 5 | Ranadhir Singh Bachawat | | 23 January 1950 | 7 September 1964 | 31 July 1969 | 14 years, 228 days | 4 years, 328 days | 19 years, 190 days | Judge of Calcutta HC |
| 6 | Gopendra Krishna Mitter | | 24 November 1952 | 29 August 1966 | 23 September 1971 | 13 years, 278 days | 5 years, 26 days | 18 years, 304 days | Judge of Calcutta HC |
| 7 | Ajit Nath Ray | | 23 December 1957 | 1 August 1969 | 27 January 1977 | 11 years, 221 days | 7 years, 180 days | 19 years, 36 days | Judge of Calcutta HC |
| 8 | Arun Kumar Mukherjea | | 27 February 1962 | 14 August 1972 | 23 October 1973^{[†]} | 10 years, 169 days | 1 year, 71 days | 11 years, 239 days | Judge of Calcutta HC |
| 9 | Alak Chandra Gupta | | 24 February 1964 | 2 September 1974 | 31 December 1981 | 10 years, 190 days | 7 years, 121 days | 17 years, 311 days | Judge of Calcutta HC |
| 10 | Amarendra Nath Sen | | 15 November 1965 | 28 January 1981 | 30 September 1985 | 15 years, 74 days | 4 years, 246 days | 19 years, 320 days | 18th CJ of Calcutta HC |
| 11 | Sabyasachi Mukharji | | 31 July 1968 | 15 March 1983 | 25 September 1990^{[†]} | 14 years, 227 days | 7 years, 195 days | 22 years, 57 days | Acting CJ of Calcutta HC |
| 12 | Bankim Chandra Ray | | 10 June 1974 | 29 October 1985 | 31 October 1991 | 11 years, 141 days | 6 years, 3 days | 17 years, 144 days | Judge of Calcutta HC |
| 13 | Murari Mohan Dutt | | 18 September 1969 | 10 March 1986 | 29 October 1989 | 16 years, 173 days | 3 years, 234 days | 20 years, 42 days | Judge of Calcutta HC |
| 14 | Ganendra Narayan Ray | | 23 December 1976 | 7 October 1991 | 30 April 1998 | 14 years, 288 days | 6 years, 206 days | 21 years, 129 days | 11th CJ of Gujarat HC |
| 15 | Manoj Kumar Mukherjee | | 17 June 1977 | 14 December 1993 | 30 November 1998 | 16 years, 180 days | 4 years, 352 days | 21 years, 167 days | 27th CJ of Bombay HC |
| 16 | Suhas Chandra Sen | | 23 November 1981 | 11 June 1994 | 20 December 1997 | 12 years, 200 days | 3 years, 193 days | 16 years, 28 days | Judge of Calcutta HC |
| 17 | Umesh Chandra Banerjee | | 9 January 1984 | 9 December 1998 | 17 November 2002 | 14 years, 334 days | 3 years, 344 days | 18 years, 313 days | CJ of erstwhile Andhra Pradesh HC |
| 18 | Ruma Pal | | 6 August 1990 | 28 January 2000 | 3 June 2006 | 9 years, 175 days | 6 years, 127 days | 15 years, 302 days | Judge of Calcutta HC |
| 19 | Tarun Chatterjee | | 6 August 1990 | 27 August 2004 | 14 January 2010 | 14 years, 21 days | 5 years, 141 days | 19 years, 162 days | 38th CJ of Allahabad HC |
| 20 | Altamas Kabir | | 6 August 1990 | 9 September 2005 | 18 July 2013 | 15 years, 34 days | 7 years, 313 days | 22 years, 347 days | 3rd CJ of Jharkhand HC |
| 21 | Asok Kumar Ganguly | | 10 January 1994 | 17 December 2008 | 3 February 2012 | 14 years, 342 days | 3 years, 49 days | 18 years, 25 days | 34th CJ of Madras HC |
| 22 | Pinaki Chandra Ghose | | 17 July 1997 | 8 March 2013 | 27 May 2017 | 15 years, 234 days | 4 years, 81 days | 19 years, 315 days | CJ of erstwhile Andhra Pradesh HC |
| 23 | Indira Banerjee | | 5 February 2002 | 7 August 2018 | 23 September 2022 | 16 years, 183 days | 4 years, 48 days | 20 years, 231 days | 39th CJ of Madras HC |
| 24 | Aniruddha Bose | | 19 January 2004 | 24 May 2019 | 10 April 2024 | 15 years, 125 days | 4 years, 323 days | 20 years, 83 days | 12th CJ of Jharkhand HC |
| 25 | Dipankar Datta | | 22 June 2006 | 12 December 2022 | Incumbent | 16 years, 172 days | 3 years, 339 days | 20 years, 147 days | 45th CJ of Bombay HC |
| 26 | Joymalya Bagchi | | 27 June 2011 | 17 March 2025 | Incumbent | 13 years, 262 days | 1 year, 244 days | 15 years, 142 days | Judge of Calcutta HC |

== Building ==
The neo-Gothic High Court building was constructed in 1872, ten years after the establishment of the court itself. The design, by then government architect Walter Granville, was loosely modelled on the 13th-century Cloth Hall at Ypres, Belgium. In 1977 another building named High Court Centenary Building or annexed building was inaugurated to reduce the pressure.

== Connectivity ==
=== Rails ===
Eden Gardens railway station is the nearest railway station, which is 650 meters away from the court. Esplanade metro station, the nearest rapid rail transit is 1.3 km away.
