= Lok Bhavan, Tamil Nadu =

Lok Bhavan, Tamil Nadu may refer to:

- Lok Bhavan, Chennai, official winter residence of the governor of Tamil Nadu, located in Chennai.
- Lok Bhavan, Ooty, official summer residence of the governor of Tamil Nadu, located in Ooty.
