= Sir Rawlinson =

Sir Rawlinson may refer to:

- Sir Henry Rawlinson, 1st Baronet (1810–1895), British diplomat and orientalist
- Sir Henry Rawlinson, a fictional character created by Vivian Stanshall, used most notably on the LP Sir Henry at Rawlinson End
- Sir Christopher Rawlinson (1806–1888), Indian judge
- Sir Robert Rawlinson (1810–1898), English engineer and sanitarian
