= Julie Schwabe =

British philanthropist, educationalist and school founder

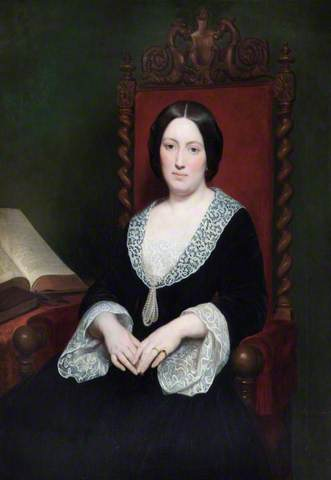
- Schwabe by Ary Scheffer in 1850
- Born: 31 January 1818; Bremen
- Died: 20 May 1896 (aged 78); Naples
- Known for: Socialite, education activist and philanthropist
- Spouse: Salis Schwabe
- Children: George Salis-Schwabe

Julie Schwabe (or Julie Salis-Schwabe; 31 January 1818 – 20 May 1896) was a British philanthropist, educationalist and school founder. She founded schools in Italy and in the UK she established the influential Froebel Education Institute now known as Froebel College, now part of the University of Roehampton.

== Life ==
Schwabe was born in Bremen in 1818 and when she was 20 she married her cousin Salis (born Salomon ben Elias) Schwabe, a successful cotton printer in Manchester, of Westphalian Jewish origin but a convert to the Unitarian church. She was known as Julie by the time of their marriage on 14 October 1837. Her husband had become a British citizen two years before. He worked closely with his workers, although he abhorred socialism. This view was not shared by Julie who could see benefits if it fed those in need.

Salis Schwabe bought an established mill that had once been damaged in Luddite riots. The Schwabes became very rich from this cotton print factory but they also supplied the funds to establish a school and a library for their employees.

Schwabe was known for entertaining which was done at Crumpsall House near Manchester, a leisure residence Glyn Garth near Beaumaris and a house in Paris. They moved into Crumpsall House in 1848 and this was a Georgian styled house with grounds, stables and sixteen staff who, according to the 1851 census, were looking after the Schwabes and their seven children and guests. The staff included nurses and at one time she employed Celestine Doudet as a governess. After Doudet left their employ, she was charged with murder in Paris. Doudet had been employed to take a Dr Marsden's five daughters to Paris where she was to "cure" them of masturbation. Marsden and Doudet had introduced restraints and punishments to try and cure the girls. Marsden threatened to abandon his daughters if they could not desist. Mary Ann Marsden died from cruelty and starvation or as Doudet said from whooping cough. Schwabe appeared at her trial as a character witness and when Doudet was found guilty of causing the death (reduced on appeal to cruelty) Schwabe tried unsuccessfully to get the novelist Charles Dickens to intercede.

The Schwabes toured Europe with Richard Cobden and his wife as they campaigned for free trade. They arranged for Frederic Chopin to visit to raise funds for an infirmary in Manchester. He stayed with them at Crumpsall House, and if he had stayed a few days more he would have met Jenny Lind, who was the next celebrity to be a house guest.

Jenny Lind raised £1,000 for Giuseppe Garibaldi. Schwabe had just sent relief supplies to Garibaldi in 1860 and the following year she formed the Italian Ladies' Philanthropic Association. The Lind concert was part of £3,000 that she raised to fund food and education. Schwabe personally organised the education as she set up an elementary school in Naples which ran for five years until the head teacher, Emily Reeve, died of cholera. The school had to close but Schwabe did not lose interest in education. In 1873 Schwabe decided to start another educational institution in Naples and she leased the Collegio Medico for that purpose. She had originally intended to base the school on the ideas of William Ellis but she was further inspired by the ideas of Fröbel. Fröbel believed in learning to play rather than by rote. Fröbel, and Schwabe, wanted children to learn the basics of education, as well as skills that they could use to establish livelihoods. Schwabe's schools in Naples were gaining small contributions from the Italian and Neapolitan politicians as well as coverage in the British press by 1876.

In the 1890s she brought her ideas back to England where she helped fund the Froebel Education Institute. Schwabe was said to have raised £2,000 by being more frugal with her lifestyle. She persuaded Claude Montefiore and Sir William Mather to assist and Leopold and Maria de Rothschild gave their support. The project also enjoyed the support of Empress Frederick. The 1894 meeting was at the Rothschild's house in Picadilly when the leading people spoke. George William Kekewich, Secretary of the government education department, gave his support with Montefiore as treasurer and Mather as chair.

Schwabe died in Naples in 1896 at the former Collegio Medico. The school had been renamed in 1887 the "Institico Froebeliano Internazionale Vittorio Emanuele II" and by 1889 it had about 950 pupils divided between five schools that took children from five to eighteen with the option of a years teacher training.

One of her children was George Salis-Schwabe, a soldier and Liberal politician; his son was Sir Walter George Salis Schwabe, Chief Justice of the Madras High Court from 1921 to 1924.
