= Padmanbhapillay Govindan Nair =

18th Chief Justice of Madras High Court

Hon'ble Chief Justice P. Govindan Nair

18th Chief Justice of Madras High Court
- In office 3 January 1977 – 28 May 1978
- Nominated by: Ajit Nath Ray
- Appointed by: Fakhruddin Ali Ahmed
- Preceded by: P. S. Kailasam
- Succeeded by: T. Ramaprasada Rao

7th Chief Justice of Kerala High Court
- In office 22 May 1973 – 2 January 1977
- Appointed by: V. V. Giri
- Preceded by: T. C. Raghavan
- Succeeded by: V. P. Gopalan Nambiyar

Judge of Kerala High Court
- In office 29 January 1962 – 21 May 1973
- Nominated by: B. P. Sinha
- Appointed by: Rajendra Prasad

Personal details
- Born: 29 May 1916
- Died: Not known
- Occupation: Judge

Padmanbhapillay Govindan Nair (born 29 May 1916 - Death date unknown) commonly known as P. Govindan Nair was an Indian judge, who served as the Chief Justice of High Courts of Madras and Kerala. He was former judge of Kerala High Court and also acting Governor of Tamil Nadu.

== Career ==
Nair was born on 29 May 1916. He entered the legal profession on 9 September 1941, when he was enrolled as an advocate of the Travancore High Court. He subsequently practised before the High Courts of Travancore, Travancore-Cochin and, following its establishment, the High Court of Kerala. In 1951, he was also enrolled as an advocate of the Supreme Court of India. Alongside his private practice, Nair undertook important legal advisory work. He served as legal adviser to the State Insurance Department for two years and later advised the Cochin Port from 1 March 1958 until his elevation to the Bench. He also maintained an association with legal education during his years at the Bar. From June 1951 to July 1954, he worked as a part-time lecturer at the Law College, combining teaching with his legal practice.

Nair was appointed as a judge of the Kerala High Court on 29 January 1962. He subsequently became the Chief Justice of the Kerala High Court in 1973. On 3 January 1977, Govindan Nair was transferred to the Madras High Court, succeeding P. S. Kailasam as Chief Justice. He served as Chief Justice of Madras until 28 May 1978. He served as acting Governor of Tamil Nadu from 9 April to 27 April 1977, during a vacancy in the office of Governor.
