= George Salis-Schwabe =

British army officer, calico printer and Liberal politician

Brigade Major George Salis-Schwabe CB (Chorlton-upon-Medlock, Lancashire 6 July 1843 – Bad Kissingen / Franconia 13 June 1907) was a British army officer, calico printer and Liberal politician.

== Life ==
Salis-Schwabe was the son of Salis (born Salomon ben Elias; 1800–1853) Schwabe of Crumpsall House, Middleton, and Glyn Garth, Anglesey, formerly of Rhodes House, Middleton, a successful cotton printer of North German Jewish origin who had settled in Glasgow in 1818, moved to Middleton, Lancashire, in 1832, converted to the Church of England in 1831 and joined the Unitarian Church about 1842, and his wife, noted educationalist Julie Schwabe (her husband's cousin). His parents had a wide circle of notable friends.

Salis-Schwabe was educated at University College School, London and London University. He joined the army in 1863 and was Brigade Major of Cavalry at the Curragh and at Aldershot from 1873 to 1877. He served in the Anglo-Zulu War in 1879 when he was mentioned in despatches and awarded Medal with Clasp. In 1881, he became Lieutenant-Colonel commanding the 16th Lancers. He was a partner in firm of Salis Schwabe & Co, Calico Printers, of Rhodes and Manchester.

At the 1885 general election Salis-Schwabe was elected as the Member of Parliament (MP) for the new Middleton division of Lancashire. When the Liberals split over Home Rule for Ireland, he joined the breakaway Liberal Unionist Party, and did not stand again at the 1886 election.

George Salis Schwabe became Major-General in 1898 and was Lieutenant Governor of the Chelsea Royal Hospital until 1905. He was appointed a Companion of the Order of the Bath (CB) in the 1902 Coronation Honours list published on 26 June 1902, and received the decoration from King Edward VII at Buckingham Palace on 24 October 1902.

He died on 13 July 1907, at the age of 63.

== Family ==
Salis-Schwabe married in 1870 Mary Jaqueline James, daughter of Sir William Milbourne James, Lord Justice of Appeal. They had five children: Maurice Salis Schwabe (born 1871 in Easthampstead, Berkshire), Sir Walter George Salis Schwabe (born 1873), KC, sometime Chief Justice of the Madras High Court, Edgar William Salis Schwabe (born 1875 in Ireland), Gladys Mary Salis Schwabe (Born in Prestwich 11 March 1878) and Rhoda Jaqueline Salis Schwabe (born in Ireland 1885). Gladys married British businessman Paul Crompton and died with him and their six children in the 7 May 1915 sinking of the RMS Lusitania.

Parliament of the United Kingdom
New constituency see South East Lancashire	Member of Parliament for Middleton; 1885–1886	Succeeded by Thomas Fielden
Military offices
Preceded by Andrew Smythe Montague Browne	Colonel of the 3rd (Prince of Wales's) Dragoon Guards; 1905–1907	Succeeded by Sir Reginald Talbot
