= Walter Morgan (judge) =

Welsh barrister and judge active in India (1821–1903)

Sir Walter Morgan

2nd Chief Justice of Madras High Court
- In office 22 November 1871 – 7 February 1879
- Appointed by: Queen Victoria
- Preceded by: Colley Harman Scotland; Adam Bittleston (acting)
- Succeeded by: Charles Arthur Turner

1st Chief Justice of Allahabad High Court
- In office 17 March 1866 – 21 November 1871
- Appointed by: Queen Victoria
- Preceded by: Position established
- Succeeded by: Robert Stuart

Judge of Calcutta High Court
- In office 1 July 1862 – 16 March 1866
- Appointed by: Queen Victoria

Personal details
- Born: 1821 Llantrisant, Glamorgan, Wales
- Died: 28 October 1906 (aged 84–85)
- Occupation: lawyer, judge
- Profession: Chief Justice

Sir Walter Morgan (1821–28 October 1906) was a Welsh judge who is the first Chief Justice of the Allahabad High Courtin British India. He also became the Chief justice of Madras High Court from 1871 to 1879.

== Life ==
Morgan was born in Llantrisant, Glamorgan, Wales, the son of Walter Morgan, and educated at King's College London. He entered the Middle Temple, and was called to the Bar 22 November 1844. His early years in the profession were uninspiring, and his progress slow, leading him to consider other employment, until he conceived of going to India.

Morgan served as a puisne judge at Calcutta (where, with his mastery of equity law, he was considered 'one of the most well-informed legal men' there) before being promoted to Chief Justice at Allahabad, where he served from 1866 to 1871, having also been knighted. While Swami Vivekananda's father Vishwanath Datta applied to be enrolled as an attorney-at-law, Morgan approved the prayer.

His reputation continued to increase during this period, which stood him in good stead to take the position of Chief Justice at Calcutta, Bombay or Madras. With no opening at Calcutta or Bombay, Morgan was appointed Chief Justice of the Madras High Court, where he remained until 7 February 1879. Although Morgan was respected during his time at Madras, he was not a loved figure to either the Bar or the public; some were critical of him, and he was perceived as 'chill' and 'colourless'.

Morgan died in 1903, having lived at Eastbourne.

== Family ==
Morgan's eldest son, Walter, married Caroline, daughter of John Hunter-Blair of the Madras Civil Service, and granddaughter of Sir David Hunter-Blair, 3rd Baronet. Fifth son Harington Morgan (d. 1914), a barrister of the Middle Temple and judge in the Civil Courts of Justice in Sudan, married Lilian Elizabeth Lutley (daughter of Philip Lutley Sclater and Jane Anne Eliza, daughter of Sir David Hunter-Blair, 3rd Baronet); Lilian was therefore a first cousin of Caroline Hunter-Blair, mentioned above.
