= Arthur Melmoth Walters =

English footballer

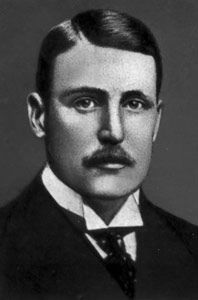

Personal information
- Full name: Arthur Melmoth Walters
- Date of birth: 26 January 1865
- Place of birth: Ewell, England
- Date of death: 2 May 1941 (aged 76)
- Place of death: Holmwood, Surrey, England
- Positions: Left back; right back

Youth career
- 1882–1883: Charterhouse School

Senior career*
Years	Team	Apps	(Gls)
1884–1887	Cambridge University		
1884–1893	Corinthian		
1887–1895(?)	Old Carthusians		

International career
1885–1890	England	9	(0)
- * Club domestic league appearances and goals

Arthur Melmoth Walters (26 January 1865 – 2 May 1941) was an English amateur footballer who played as a defender for the Old Carthusians and the Corinthians in the late nineteenth century as well as making nine appearances for England. He was president of the Law Society of England and Wales.

He and his elder brother, Percy Melmoth Walters, were known as "morning" and "afternoon" in allusion to their initials. The brothers were generally regarded as the finest fullbacks in England for a number of years; according to Philip Gibbons in his "History of the Game from 1863 to 1900" this was due mainly to their own defensive system based on the combination game used by the Royal Engineers during the early 1870s.

== Family and education ==
Walters was born in Ewell, Surrey, the son of William Melmoth Walters (1835–1926), a solicitor and member of an old Somerset family, and Marian Eleanor Leggatt (b. 1840). He was educated at Windlesham House School, then Charterhouse where he played for the school football team in 1882 and 1883 before going up to Trinity College, Cambridge, where he won a blue in each of the years from 1884 to 1887.

In 1892, he married Amy Constance Parbury, the daughter of G. W. Parbury, of Ifield, Crawley and they had 5 sons and 4 daughters, including Amy (born 1894), Anthony (1895), Herbert (1900), Bridget (1914) and Thomas (1917) and Marion Elizabeth (who married into the Palmes Family) (born 1901), his son Guy served in the Irish Guards and was a prisoner of war during World War II.

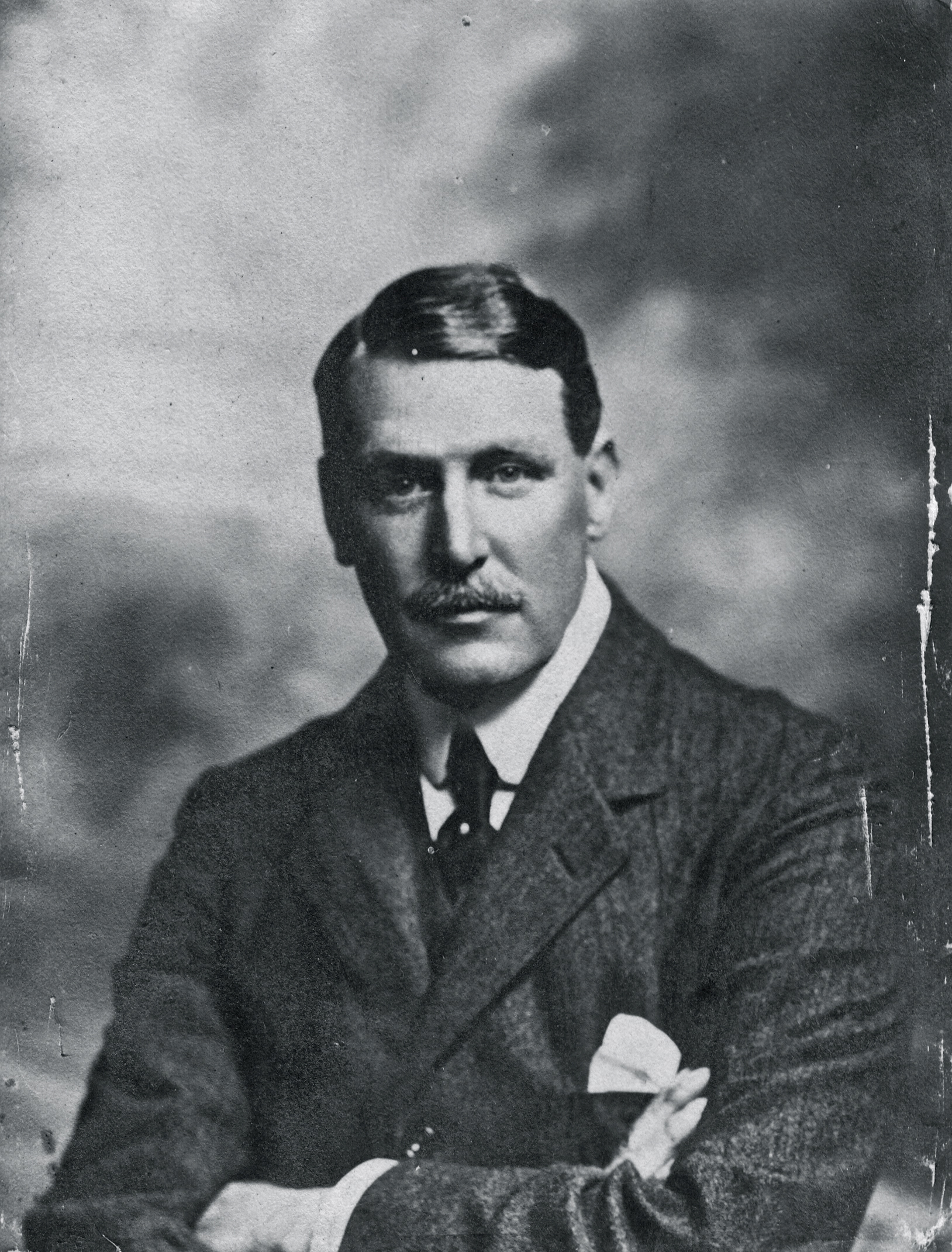
Arthur Melmoth Walters (Footballer and president of the Law Society)

== Football career ==
=== Corinthian ===
In his first year at Cambridge, Walters joined the Corinthian club which had been established two years earlier with a view to giving amateur players the opportunity to play together on a regular basis to improve the quality and strength of the England team.

Arthur made his debut for Corinthian on 13 November 1884, in a 7–1 defeat by Notts Club. He was unable to take part in the Corinthians tour of northern England in December, but was able to join the Easter tour in which five games were played in six days. Arthur played in four of the five games, including the opening fixture against Preston North End on 6 April 1885, when he played at left-back with his brother Percy alongside him on the right.

This match was the first of many over the next six years in which the two brothers played alongside each other as the two full backs. Amongst the more significant matches were a 6–0 defeat of the FA Cup holders, Blackburn Rovers, in December 1885 and a 7–0 victory over Notts County in March 1886, when fellow Old Carthusian William Cobbold scored four goals.

The brothers' final match together for Corinthian was on 8 November 1890 in an eight-goal victory over Sheffield in which younger brother H.M. Walters (who was only playing his second match) scored a hat-trick, with another goal from Percy. The other four goals came from V.G. Manns, who was playing his only match for Corinthian. Shortly after this match, the younger brother died from a football injury inflicted during a match and, in deference to their parents' wishes, both brothers retired from football to concentrate on their legal careers.

The withdrawal of the Walters brothers from the Corinthian team had a significant effect on the team's performances as they were "extremely hard to replace, and Corinthian were destined to win only six of their next nineteen games".

Despite the promise made to their parents, the brothers made a return to the Corinthians for a multi-sport tournament against the Barbarians rugby club in April 1892. Arthur played in the soccer match (without Percy) which Corinthian won 6–0, with Tinsley Lindley scoring a hat-trick. The clubs also played a rugby match, which Corinthian won 16–13, although the match was not a very serious encounter and was described by The Times newspaper as "a very amusing game". The rugby match was followed by an athletics meeting in which C. B. Fry was prominent, winning both the long jump and high jump. Finally, the two clubs met a few weeks later in a cricket match in which Percy played alongside several other prominent Corinthians, including Fry, Lindley and Charles Wreford-Brown.

Arthur's final Corinthian matches came when he made a brief come-back at the end of the 1892–93 season with appearances against Bournemouth and Queen's Park. During his time with the Corinthians, Walters made 48 appearances, scoring once.

=== Old Carthusians ===
After graduating in 1887, Walters joined the old-boys' team for his former school, the Old Carthusians. His major successes came late in his time with the club, reaching successive FA Amateur Cup finals, winning the cup in 1894, the competition's inaugural year, and reaching the final in 1895.

=== England ===
Arthur and Percy made their England debuts together on 28 February 1885 in a 4–0 victory over Ireland, with Arthur at right back and Percy on the left.

In the match against Scotland on 27 March 1886, nine of the eleven players selected were members of the Corinthian club, although all had their primary affiliation with other clubs. The match ended in a 1–1 draw, with England's being scored by fellow Corinthian Tinsley Lindley.

Arthur made a total of nine appearances for England, with the final match being against Scotland in the 1890 British Home Championship. The match ended 1–1, and as a result England and Scotland shared the championship. Of the nine matches played for England, four were won, three drawn (all against Scotland) and two were lost (also against Scotland).

== Life away from sport ==
Walters spent some time as a volunteer in the army, and in August 1886, he was promoted to the rank of lieutenant in the 3rd Surrey Rifles.

Walters eventually qualified as a solicitor in 1899, and joined the family firm. He was president of the Law Society of England and Wales.

He became a director of the London Guarantee and Accident Co., and of the Phoenix Assurance Co.

He died at his home at Minnickwood, Holmwood, Surrey on 2 May 1941 aged 76. His great-grandson is the journalist Tom Bradby.

== Sporting honours ==
Old Carthusians

- FA Amateur Cup winners: 1894
- FA Amateur Cup finalists: 1895.
