= A. Madhaviah =

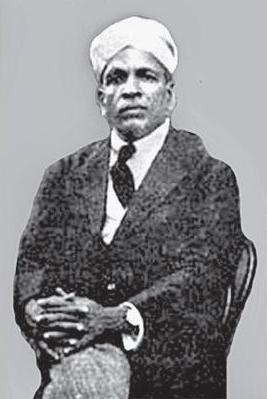
- Born: 16 August 1872. Perungulam, Tinnevely District, Madras Presidency, British India (now in Thoothukudi district, Tamil Nadu, India)
- Died: 22 October 1925 (aged 53); Madras, Madras Presidency, British India (now Chennai, Tamil Nadu, India)
- Spouse: Meenakshi
- Children: Meenambal, Lakshmi, Visalakshi, Muthulakshmi, Saraswati, M. Anantanarayanan, P.M.Y. Narayanan; M. Krishnan
- Writing career
- Language: Tamil, English
- Genres: social reform, classical literature, history
- Notable work: Padmavathi sarithiram (1898)
- Website: www.madhaviah.org

Anantanarayanan Madhaviah (16 August 1872 – 22 October 1925) is one of the pioneer Tamil writers, novelists and journalists. His writings were about social reformation and misogyny in society. He is the author of one the early Tamil Novels named Padmavathi sarithiram.

His book Muthumeenakshi is a commentary on marital politics, sexuality, female illiteracy and patriarchy in his time in south India. His take on the reformation in society can be achieved through education.

== Life ==
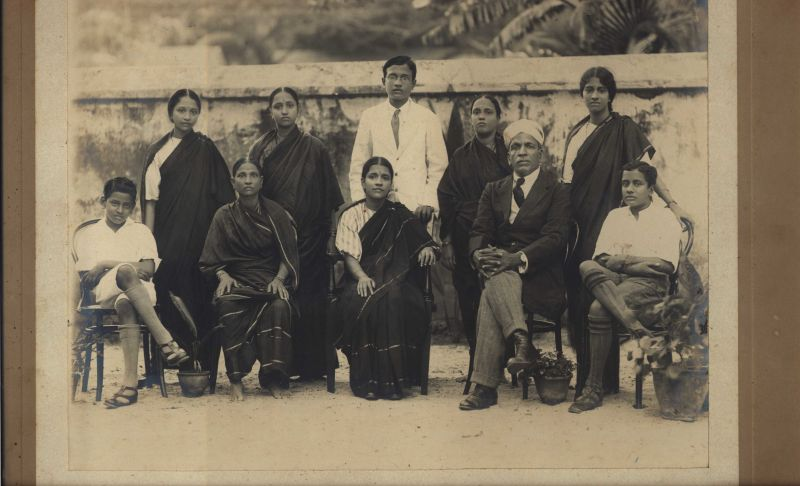
A. Madhaviah Family Group Photograph

Madhaviah was born on 16 August 1872 in Perungulam, a town in present-day Thoothukudi district, Tamil Nadu, India.

At the age of 15, he married a 11 year old girl named Meenakshi.

He studied Bachelors degree from Madras Christian College in 1892 and taught in the same college for five years.

== Partial works ==
=== Novel ===
==== In Tamil ====
- Padmavathi sarithiram (1898)
- Muthumeenakshi (1903)
- Vijayamarthandam (1903)

==== In English ====
- Thillai Govindan (1903)
- Satyananda (1909)
- The story of Ramanyana (1914)
- Clarinda (1915)
- Lieutenant Panju (1915)
- Markandeya (1922)
- Nanda (1923)
- Manimekalai (1923)

== Critics ==
His writings are criticized as being ambivalent toward British Protestant missions in the Madras Presidency. During his time the university students in South India had different family background and when they met the western philosophies it created new thoughts for them which were felt reformist in that era.
