= Walter Schwabe =

British judge

Sir Walter Schwabe KC

7th Chief Justice of Madras High Court
- In office 1921–1924
- Appointed by: George V
- Preceded by: J. E. P. Wallis
- Succeeded by: Murray Coutts-Trotter

Personal details
- Born: 3 March 1873 London, England
- Died: 20 April 1931 (aged 58) London, England
- Spouse: Julie Schwabe
- Parents: George Salis-Schwabe; Mary Jacqueline
- Relatives: William Milbourne James (maternal grandfather)
- Education: Cheltenham College, Marlborough College, Trinity College, Oxford
- Occupation: Lawyer, judge
- Profession: Chief Justice

Sir Walter George Salis Schwabe KC (3 March 1873 – 20 April 1931) was a British barrister and Chief Justice of the Madras High Court from 1921 to 1924 in British India.

Schwabe was the second son of Liberal politician Maj.-Gen. George Salis Schwabe, C.B., by his wife Mary Jacqueline, daughter of Sir William Milbourne James, Lord Justice of Appeal in 1870. His paternal grandfather, Salis (born Solomon ben Elias) Schwabe (1800–1853), of Crumpsall House, Manchester, and Glyn Garth, Anglesey, formerly of Rhodes House, Middleton, was a successful calico printer of Jewish origin who was born in Ovelgönne (near Oldenburg), first settled in Glasgow in 1817, then moved to Rhodes (near Manchester) in 1832 and converted to the Anglican Church, ten years later to Unitarianism. He married his cousin Julie Schwabe, who became a noted educationist.

Educated at Cheltenham College, Marlborough College and Trinity College, Oxford (B.A. 1894), Schwabe was called to the Bar from the Inner Temple 26 January 1897, and entered the Northern Circuit. He was appointed King's Counsel in 1913. He was joint author of Schwabe and Branson's Law of the Stock Exchange and Effect of War on Stock Exchange.

Schwabe was a well-regarded figure professionally: his 'brilliance as a student, his success at the English Bar, and his attainment as an author gave especial Satisfaction to the members of the Madras Bar'. Schwabe also served as a captain in the 19th Volunteer Battalion, London Regiment during the First World War. He was created Knight Bachelor in 1922 (Gazetted April 14).

He married firstly, in 1901, Margaret (d. 1927), daughter of Arthur Sanderson, of Edinburgh; his second wife (m. 1927) was Violet Beatrice, daughter of Percival Edward Reeve and Beatrice Mary, daughter of Capt. George Fearnley-Whittingstall, J.P., of Watford and Hawkswick, Herts., later Mrs Cecil John Thornhill.

Schwabe died 20 April 1931.
