= Lionel Leach =

British administrator in Burma

The Right Honourable Sir Lionel Leach
- Portrait in the Madras High Court

10th Chief Justice of Madras High Court
- In office 1937–1947
- Appointed by: George VI
- Preceded by: Owen Beasley
- Succeeded by: Frederick Gentle

Judge of Burma High Court
- In office 10 February 1933 – 1937
- Appointed by: George V

Personal details
- Born: 3 February 1883 Rochdale, Lancashire
- Died: 26 January 1960 (aged 76) London, England

Sir Alfred Henry Lionel Leach, PC (3 February 1883 – 26 January 1960) was a British barrister and judge who served as a judge of the Rangoon High Court from 1933 to 1937, Chief Justice of the Madras High Court from 1937 to 1947 and a member of the Judicial Committee of the Privy Council from 1949 to 1960.

== Early life and education ==
Lionel Leach was born on 3 February 1883 in Rochdale, the son of barrister Robert Alfred Leach. After being educated privately, Lionel Leach was called to the bar in 1907 by Gray's Inn. He was later elected a bencher of the Inn 1949.

== Judicial career in India ==
On 10 February 1933, Leach was appointed puisne judge of the Burma High Court in succession of Mr Justice Otter. He served in Burma until 1937 when he was transferred to Madras as Chief Justice of Madras. He was knighted in the 1938 New Year Honours.

Leach's transfer and promotion to Madras was initially not well-received there, as the law administered in Burma was chiefly Buddhist law, whereas it was thought that Madras could have provided a judge better versed in Hindu law. Nevertheless, Leach was highly regarded during his tenure, being particularly credited with reducing the backlog of cases and in reducing conflicting rulings by frequently sitting with full benches.

During the Second World War, Leach served in the Indian Defence Force and the Indian Army Reserve of Officers.

Among high-profile trials during his tenure was the Lakshmikanthan Murder Case and Leach presided over the sensational trial in 1944 in which M. K. Thyagaraja Bhagavathar and N. S. Krishnan were found guilty.

== Judicial career in the United Kingdom ==
Leach served until 1 February 1947 and was succeeded by Sir Frederick Gentle. Returning to England the same year, he was appointed an Official Referee of the Supreme Court in 1948, serving until 1956. In 1949, Leach was one of five former judges in India and Burma to be appointed King's Counsel in a special list, "so that advantage may be taken of their judicial experience for the purpose of obtaining their help at Assizes when required". He was duly appointed a Commissioner of Assize on the North-Eastern Circuit.

In August 1949, he was sworn of the Privy Council under the provisions of the Appellate Jurisdiction Act 1908 so as to enable him to sit in the Judicial Committee of the Privy Council. There were usually two members of the Judicial Committee from India; but one was absent at the time, and Leach's services were required to clear the backlog of Indian appeals, which ceased when Indian became a republic soon after.

Leach headed the Singapore Riots Inquiry Commission of 1951 that made recommendations after the Maria Hertogh riots. He was appointed by Governor Sir Franklin Gimson.

== Death ==
Lionel Leach died in his chambers at Gray's Inn Square on 26 January 1960 at the age of 76. A requiem mass for him was celebrated at Farm Street Church on 30 January 1960.

== Family ==
Leach married in 1908 Sophia Hedwig Kiel (died 1954), daughter of Prof Dr Heinrich August Kiel, of Bonn, Germany. They had one son, Lieutenant-Colonel Lionel Robert Henry Gerald Leach, MC.
