= Madras Naturalists' Society =

Indian non-governmental organization

- Headquarters: No.8, Janaki Avenue, Abhirampuram, Chennai 18
- Location: Chennai, India
- Region served: India
- Executive Committee: K.V. Sudhakar, Rohini Shankar, G. Vijaya Kumar, Umesh Mani, E.E. Sundaramurthy, S. Thyagarajan, R. Bhanumathi, Tara Gandhi, Dr. Geetha Jaikumar, Pritam Kukillaya
- Website: www.blackbuck.org.in

Madras Naturalists' Society is a non-governmental organization that promotes appreciation, education and conservation of Nature. It was founded by bird watchers from the city of Madras (now Chennai), India) on 17 May 1978. G. K. Bhat was the organization's first President. The logo of the society is a Blackbuck

The society started publishing a monthly bulletin from December 1978 and a quarterly journal Blackbuck from January 1985 Blackbuck carries semi-technical articles and works of popular interest. The digitised Version of 'Blackbuck' and the monthly bulletin was unveiled on 2 July 2015 to the members. An anthology of writings from the Blackbuck titled Sprint of the Blackbuck was published in 2012. The volume was edited by noted Tamil film historian and Madras Naturalists' Society member S. Theodore Baskaran.

Starting from Madhavaiah Krishnan's birth centenary year in 2012, the society annual presents a "M. Krishnan Memorial Nature Writing Award" for young wildlife writers.

== Notable members ==
- Madhaviah Krishnan
- S. Theodore Baskaran
- V. Krishnamurthy

== See also ==
- Birding in Chennai
