= Fakkir Mohamed Ibrahim Kalifulla =

Indian judge (born 1951)

Judge of the Supreme Court of India
- In office 2 April 2012 – 22 July 2016
- Nominated by: Rajendra Mal Lodha
- Appointed by: Pranab Mukherjee

Chief Justice of Jammu and Kashmir High Court
- In office 24 February 2011 – 2 April 2012
- Nominated by: S. H. Kapadia
- Appointed by: Pratibha Patil

Personal details
- Born: 23 July 1951 (age 74) Karaikudi, Tamilnadu

Fakkir Mohamed Ibrahim Kalifulla (born 23 July 1951) is a former judge of the Supreme Court of India.

== Early life ==
Fakkir Mohamed Ibrahim Kalifulla was born on 23 July 1951, in Karaikudi, Sivagangai District, Tamil Nadu, India.

== Career ==
Honorable Kalifulla enrolled as an advocate on 20 August 1975, after which he began practicing labour law in the law firm of T.S. Gopalan & Co. On 2 March 2000, he was appointed a judge of the Madras High Court. In February 2011, he became a member of the High Court of Jammu and Kashmir and was appointed to serve as the acting Chief Justice two months later. In September 2011, he was named as the Chief Justice of High Court of Jammu and Kashmir. On 2 April 2012, he was named to the Supreme Court of India, and sworn in by Chief Justice Sarosh Homi Kapadia. Justice Kalifulla retired from the Supreme Court of India on 22 July 2016. On 8 March 2019 a five-judge Constitution Bench has referred Ayodhya's Ram Janmabhoomi-Babri disputed structure land dispute case to mediation for amicable settlement. The bench, headed by Chief Justice Ranjan Gogoi, appointed a three-member panel to act as mediators. The panel will be headed by former Supreme Court judge FM Kalifullah with Sri Sri Ravi Shankar (spiritual leader) and mediation expert Sriram Panchu as other members.
