= Robert Stuart (judge) =

British Indian Judge

Sir Robert Stuart

2nd Chief Justice of Allahabad High Court
- In office 22 November 1871 – 31 October 1884
- Appointed by: Queen Victoria
- Preceded by: Walter Morgan
- Succeeded by: William Comer Petheram

Personal details
- Born: 1816 Scotland
- Died: Not known
- Occupation: lawyer, judge
- Profession: Chief Justice

Robert Stuart was a British Indian Judge and the second Chief Justice of the Allahabad High Court.

== Career ==
Stuart was born in Scotland in 1816. He was enrolled as an Advocates in Scotland in 1840, later he came to London and joined Lincoln's Inn of which he became a Bencher in 1868 and Treasurer in 1884. In London he practised on the Chancery side and was made a Queen's Counsel in 1868. He came to British India and was appointed as Chief Justice at Allahabad High Court on the 22 November 1871 after Sir Walter Morgan. Justice Stuart retired in 1884.
