= Frederick Gentle =

11th Chief Justice of Madras High Court

The Right Honourable Sir Frederick William Gentle

11th Chief Justice of Madras High Court
- In office 12 July 1947 – 19 April 1948
- Appointed by: George VI
- Preceded by: Lionel Leach
- Succeeded by: P. V. Rajamannar

Judge of Calcutta High Court
- In office 10 November 1941 – 11 July 1947
- Appointed by: George VI

Judge of Madras High Court
- In office 1936 – 10 November 1941
- Appointed by: George V

Personal details
- Born: 12 July 1892
- Died: 24 February 1966 (aged 73)
- Parent: William Gentle
- Education: Queens' College, Cambridge

Sir Frederick William Gentle (12 July 1892 – 24 February 1966) was a British jurist who served in the High Courts of British India and became the last British Chief Justice of the Madras High Court before the transfer of power in 1947–48. He was also associated with the British military justice system as Judge Advocate General of the Armed Forces.

== Education and career ==
Gentle was born on 12 July 1892 to Sir William Gentle, who served as Chief Constable of Brighton from 1901 to 1920. He studied at Queens' College, University of Cambridge, from 1912 to 1915. Gentle began his judicial career in India as a puisne judge of the Madras High Court from 1936 to 1941, after which he served at the Calcutta High Court from 10 November 1941 to 1947. In 1947, he returned to Madras as Chief Justice, holding the position during the historic transition from British rule to independence. He was knighted in 1947 in recognition of his services. After his retirement in February 1948, P. V. Rajamannar succeeded him and became the first Indian Chief Justice of the Madras High Court.

Apart from his judicial career in India, Gentle also served as Judge Advocate General, a senior legal position associated with military justice. He was later appointed an Honorary Fellow of Queens' College in 1951. He died on 24 February 1966, aged 73.
