= Arthur Collins (judge) =

English colonial judge (1834–1915)

Sir Arthur John Hammond Collins

4th Chief Justice of Madras High Court
- In office 1885–1899
- Appointed by: Queen Victoria
- Preceded by: Charles Arthur Turner
- Succeeded by: Charles Arnold White

Personal details
- Born: 14 February 1834 Parkstone, Dorset, England
- Died: 12 September 1915 (aged 81) Kensington, London, England
- Education: Oxford University
- Occupation: Lawyer
- Profession: Recorder; Chief Justice

Sir Arthur John Hammond Collins (14 February 1834 – 12 September 1915) was an English colonial judge who was Chief Justice of Madras in British India.

He was born the son of John Collins and Louisa Strong Collins of Parkstone, Dorset. He was educated at Oxford University and studied law at Gray's Inn, where he was called to the bar in 1860. He was also a barrister at the Middle Temple and made Queen's Counsel (QC) in 1877. He was Treasurer of Gray's Inn in 1883 and again in 1905.

He served as Recorder of Poole from 1873 to 1879 and as Recorder of Exeter from 1879 to 1885. He was also the Chief Royal Commissioner on the inquiry into corrupt practices at the City of Chester elections. In 1885 he was appointed Chief Justice at the Madras High Court and knighted at Osborne House before he left for India. He held the post of Chief Justice until 1899, also acting as Vice-Chancellor of the University of Madras from 1889 to 1899.

He died at his home in Kensington in 1915. He had married Isabella, daughter of the Rev. Richard Wilson.

== Arms ==
Coat of arms of Arthur Collins
Crest A camel’s head erased Argent. Escutcheon Vert a griffin segreant Or on a canton Gules a fleur-de-lis Argent. Motto Sermoni Consona Facta
