= William Melmoth Walters =

British lawyer

- Born: 1835
- Died: 1925 (aged 89–90)

William Melmoth Walters (25 January 1835 – 20 November 1925) was President of the Incorporated Law Society (1891-1892) and member of an old Somerset family.

== Family background ==
Walters was the eldest son of solicitor John Eldad Walters of Lincoln's Inn and Eleanor, daughter and co-heiress of Alexander Radclyffe Sidebottom. He was a nephew-in-law of Sir Christopher Rawlinson.

Walters was a descendant of William Melmoth, the poet William King and a relation of Edward Hyde, 1st Earl of Clarendon.

On 17 July 1860, he married Marian Eleanor, eldest child of Alfred Leggatt, of Lowndes Square, London. He was the father of the famous amateur footballers Arthur Melmoth Walters and Percy Melmoth Walters. His daughter Gertrude married barrister Thomas Richard Rawlinson, a relative of Sir Christopher Rawlinson; their son was the soldier and screenwriter/ film producer A. R. Rawlinson.

== Career ==
Walters was head of the firm Walters and Company, of Lincoln's Inn, which was founded in about 1780; member of Council and Past President of the Incorporated Law Society; solicitor to the Law Life Assurance Society; director of the Law Fire Insurance Society; director of the Law Debenture Corporation, the Law Accident Insurance Society, and the Solicitors' Benevolent Association; member of the Solicitors' Discipline Committee, appointed under the Solicitors Act 1888 (51 & 52 Vict. c. 65), the Committee of Inspection of Trustee Savings Banks, appointed under the Savings Banks Act 1891 (54 & 55 Vict. c. 21), the Committee of Proprietors of Lincoln's Inn, and of the Rule Making Committee under the Land Transfer Acts.

Walters was a Conservative in politics, and Chairman of Ewell, Cuddington and Malden Conservative Association.

== Hobbies ==
He enjoyed fishing in Norway and Scotland, and shooting in Surrey. He travelled on the Continent frequently in his earlier years, and visited the Cape, Tasmania and Australia, Madeira, Teneriffe.
