= Kuppuswami Naidu Veeraswami =

Indian judge (1914-2010)

- Born: Kuppuswami Naidu Veeraswami; 8 April 1914; Srivilliputtur, Tamil Nadu, India
- Died: 2010 (aged 95–96)

Kuppuswami Naidu Veeraswami (1914-2010) was an Indian judge and Chief Justice of the Madras High Court from 5 January 1969 to 3 November 1976.
