= Henry Davison (judge) =

British lawyer and jurist

Sir Henry Davison

Chief Justice of the Madras High Court
- In office 1859–1860
- Preceded by: Sir Christopher Rawlinson
- Succeeded by: Sir Colley Harman Scotland

Personal details
- Born: 16 March 1805 London, England
- Died: 4 November 1860 (aged 55) Ootacamund, British India
- Occupation: lawyer, judge
- Profession: Chief Justice

Sir Henry Davison (16 March 1805 – 4 November 1860) was the Chief Justice of the Supreme Court of Madras in British India from 1859 to 1860.

The fourth son of Thomas Davison, of St Bride's, Fleet Street, City of London, Davison was educated at Trinity College, Oxford (B.A. 1829, M.A. 1834), and called to the Bar from the Middle Temple in 1834.

Having been a puisne judge at Madras (sworn in 16 March 1857), Davison was appointed Chief Justice in March 1859, but did not serve for long, dying at Ootacamund on 4 November 1860. William Makepeace Thackeray affectionately dedicated his historical novel The Virginians (published from 1857 to 1859) to Davison.

Davison was married and had issue; his daughter, Emily Jane, married the organist Philip Armes in 1864.
