= Bhabatosh Datta =

Indian economist, academic and writer

- Born: 21 February 1911; Patna, Bihar Province, British India
- Died: 11 January 1997 (aged 85); Calcutta, India
- Resting place: 23°15′37″N 88°31′52″E
- Occupations: Educationist, Economist, poet, writer
- Spouse: Amala Datta
- Parent(s): Hemendra Kishore Datta; Jogmaya Datta
- Awards: Padma Vibhushan (1990)

Bhabatosh Datta (21 February 1911 – 11 January 1997) was a noted Indian economist, academic and writer. He taught at Chittagong College and later became Professor of Economics, Presidency College, Kolkata, where he later became an Emeritus Professor.

In 1990, he was awarded the Padma Vibhushan, the second highest civilian award, by Government of India.

== Early life and background ==
Datta was born in Patna, Bihar to Hemendra Kishore Datta and Jogmaya Datta. At the time, his father was a professor of Chemistry at Bihar National College, Patna. Thereafter, he did his schooling at various places, including Daulatpur in Khulna District, Mymensingh followed by Dhaka, now in Bangladesh. At his Dhaka school, he edited the school magazine along with fellow student Buddhadeb Bose, who went on to become a noted poet. He completed his schooling from Jagannath College Dhaka, and went on to earn B.A. (Hons.) in Economics and Political Science and M.A. Economics from Presidency College, Kolkata.

== Career ==
He started his career by working briefly at Chittagong College, and Burdwan Raj College, ultimately his received an appointment at Ripon College, Kolkata, later known as Surendranath College. Subsequently, he worked at Islamia College in Kolkata, later renamed Maulana Azad College. In 1948, he went to England on a study leave to submit his doctoral dissertation at London School of Economics after only two years. His dissertation was published in Calcutta as The Economics of Industrialization (1952). After his returned in 1952, he joined the Presidency College, Kolkata, now Presidency University as Professor of Economics. The following year, he joined IMF as chief of South Asia division, however he returned to India in 1956, and rejoined Presidency College, where he continued to work till his retirement in 1962 as Head of the Department. Thereafter, he remained Emeritus Professor at the college, and started working in state education ministry, as he became Director of Public Instruction, Department of General Education and in 1965, Secretary of Education, Government of West Bengal.

He also remained a member of Fourth Finance Commission of India formed in 1964, and also remained a member of the first working committee of Paschimbanga Bangla Akademi, Kolkata.

== Personal life ==
He married Amala Basu in 1939, she died in 1989.

== Bibliography ==
- Bhabatosh Datta (1962). The evolution of economic thinking in India. Federation Hall Society.
- Bhabatosh Datta (1962). Economic Development and Exports: A Study of the Impact of Indian Economic Development on Exports. World Press.
- Bhabatosh Datta (1963). Essays in plan economics: a commentary on Indian experience. World Press.
- Bhabatosh Datta (1966). Economics of Industrialisation: A Study of the Basic Problems of an Underdeveloped Economy. World Press.
- India, Fact Finding Committee on Newspaper Economics; Bhabatosh Datta (1975). Report of the Fact Finding Committee on Newspaper Economics: Submitted to the Government of India, Ministry of Information & Broadcasting, New Delhi, January, 1975. Controller of Publications.
- Bhabatosh Datta (1978). Indian economic thought: twentieth century perspectives, 1900–1950. Tata McGraw-Hill. ISBN 9780070963900.
- Bhabatosh Datta; Dipak Banerjee (1991). Essays in economic analysis and policy: a tribute to Bhabatosh Datta. Oxford University Press. ISBN 9780195627343.
- Bhabatosh Datta (1992). Indian Planning at the Crossroads. Oxford University Press. ISBN 978-0-19-562958-3.
- Amiya Kumar Bagchi (1988). Economy, society, and polity: essays in the political economy of Indian planning in honour of Professor Bhabatosh Datta. Published for Centre for Studies in Social Sciences, Calcutta [by] Oxford University Press. ISBN 9780195620597.
