= C. A. White =

British-Indian judge (1858–1931)

Sir Charles Arnold White

5th Chief Justice of Madras High Court
- In office 1899 – July 1914
- Appointed by: Queen Victoria
- Preceded by: Arthur Collins
- Succeeded by: J. E. P. Wallis

Advocate-General of Madras Presidency
- In office 1898–1899
- Preceded by: James Spring Branson; V. B. Aiyangar (acting)
- Succeeded by: J. E. P. Wallis; V. B. Aiyangar (acting)

Personal details
- Born: 1858
- Died: 6 September 1931 (aged 72–73)
- Education: New College, Oxford
- Occupation: Lawyer
- Profession: Advocate-General; Chief Justice

Sir Charles Arnold White (1858 – 6 September 1931) was a British lawyer and judge who served as 5th chief justice of Madras High Court in British India. He was born in 1858 to Thomas John White of Bowdon, Cheshire and educated at New College, Oxford, from where he completed his graduation in 1881 and was called to the bar in 1883.

White served as the advocate-general of the Madras Presidency and ex-officio member of the Madras Legislative Council from 1898 to 1899. He resigned in 1899 following his appointment as Chief Justice of the Madras High Court. In 1914, he was appointed to the Council of India as vice chancellor of the University of Madras.

White was made a Knight Bachelor in 1900.
