= Madhaviah Krishnan =

Indian wildlife photographer (1912–1996)

Madhaviah Krishnan (30 June 1912 – 18 February 1996), better known as M. Krishnan, was a pioneering Indian wildlife photographer, writer and naturalist.

== Early life ==
M. Krishnan was born in Tirunelveli on 30 June 1912 and was the youngest of eight siblings. His father was a Tamil writer and reformer A. Madhaviah who worked with the Salt and Abkari Department of the Government of Madras. His father's writings included one of the first realistic Tamil novels, Padmavathi Charithram published in 1898 and an English novel Thillai Govindan published in 1916. His father voluntarily retired from Government service and started a press from which he published a Tamil magazine called Panchamritam. When his father died in 1925, he was taken care of by his eldest sister, Lakshmi.

Krishnan studied in the Hindu High School and developed an interest in literature, art and nature. His family lived in Mylapore, and in those days it was covered in shrub and teemed with bird life, jackals and blackbucks. Krishnan even had a pet mongoose. In 1927 Krishnan joined the Presidency College and graduated with a BA in 1931. He also took a keen interest in botany, taught by Professor P. F. Fyson. He accompanied Fyson on field trips to the Nilgiris and the Kodaikanal hills and also acquired watercolour painting techniques from Professor Fyson's wife. Krishnan did not do well in his education and jobs were not easy. One of his older brother's who was married to the daughter of Sir T. Vijayaraghavacharya of the Indian Agricultural Research Institute at Pusa, took Krishnan to his father-in-law for advice. Krishnan was told that unless he managed to do well in studies, he could not be helped.

== Writing ==
For a while he made a living by writing to small magazines and publishing some of his drawings and caricatures. He initially wrote in several Tamil magazines. In 1942, he was offered employment by the Maharaja of Sandur near Bellary in Karnataka. Krishnan took up this position and the works he undertook included being a schoolteacher, judge, publicity officer and a political secretary to the Maharaja. He spent a lot of his time wandering in the wilderness, observing nature, tried grazing sheep, breeding pigeons to work in a pigeon postal system and writing. His essays on wildlife photography were published in The Illustrated Weekly of India in a series entitled Wildlife Photographers Diary. He also wrote in The Hindu by the pen-name of Z. In the Sunday Statesman he wrote under his own name.

In 1949, Sandur was unified in the Indian republic. From 1950 he wrote a bi-weekly column in The Statesman of Calcutta called 'Country Notebook'. In this column he wrote about various aspects of natural history. This column continued for 46 years, from 1950 to 18 February 1996, the day he died.

== Natural history ==
Krishnan was an ecological patriot in that he opposed the introduction of exotic trees. He was once asked to speak at the Indian Institute of Science at Bangalore and in late February, the Tabebuia trees were ablaze in flowers. Asked about his opinion on the flowers, he declared it as 'Disgraceful' and suggested that ... you should uproot all those foreign trees, and plant some of our own.

Krishnan was responsible for the declaration of Vedanthangal as a bird sanctuary. He was aware that he was different from most conservationists of his time – who were either European or were from the Indian aristocracy of Muslims and Rajputs often former hunters – in being a vegetarian.

It has been noted that in 1972, Krishnan foresaw the possibility that elephants could communicate using sounds that were inaudible to the human ear. This infrasound communication was confirmed by later studies by Katherine Payne.

== Photography ==
Along with his whimsical prose, poetry and drawing he used photography as another tool for expression. He worked only with black and white film. His equipment was, according to naturalist E. P. Gee, 'a large, composite affair, with the body of one make and a tele lens of another, and other parts and accessories all ingeniously mounted together by himself. I cannot swear that I saw proverbial bootlace used to fix them all together, but I am sure there must have been some wire and hoop somewhere!' He called his equipment the Super Ponderosa. Krishnan was a not a big fan of technological advances and was unimpressed by the display of India's first jet aircraft. He declared them as mechanical, chemical and inhuman and was impressed more by the living muscular speed of animals... and if you want to see something sustained in its effortless, rhythmic impetuosity, you should watch a herd of blackbuck going all out for a few miles-there is tangible, real speed for you.

== Philosophy ==
Krishnan was unhappy with the Indian system of school education. In a 1947 essay, Krishnan wrote,

...The average educated adult knows little or nothing of the teeming plant and animal life of the country, and cares less. Livestock does not interest him, and the world is to him a place which holds only human beings. He can never make friends with a hill or a dog, and if he has no one to talk to, no book to read, and no gadget to turn and unturn, he is quite lost. School education is solidly to blame for all this.

In 1967 he asked several university graduates to name two red-flowered tree or an exclusively Indian animal. Nobody passed his test and he wrote

is there something radically wrong with the education and culture of our young men and women that they should not know the answers to these reasonable questions, or is it that I have become a monomaniac and am therefore unable to perceive how unfair my questions are ?

Writing about the Indian consciousness of nature he wrote

the public (both literate and unlettered) has no interest in the great national heritage of wildlife, of which it knows little and for which it cares less.

He refused a paid invitation from Air India for a trip to London for eminent Indians. He refused on another occasion an invitation from the Smithsonian Institution. He was a fierce individualist and a recluse. Author Ramachandra Guha called him a self-reliant, Thoreauvian individualist who would not allow a mere government to pay for him. He however accepted the Padma Shri from the Indian Government in 1970.

In some of his writings he was critical and opinionated and was not well known for his diplomacy. He would refuse to let editors change his texts and that was his condition when asked to contribute a column. He fiercely argued that the usage Himalaya was correct and that a redundant 's' at its end did not respect its Sanskrit origin.

== Honours ==
Krishnan was awarded the Padma Shri by the Indian government in 1960 for his work. and the prestigious Jawaharlal Nehru Fellowship in 1968. His birth centenary in 2012, was commemorated by the Madras Naturalists' Society, Prakriti Foundation and the IIT Wildlife Club. The Madras Naturalists' Society which featured most of Krishnan's writings in their journal Blackbuck in the 1990s gives away the "M. Krishnan Memorial Nature Writing Award" annually.
