= M. M. Ismail =

Indian Judge

15th Chief Justice of the Madras High Court
- In office 6 November 1979 – 9 July 1981
- Preceded by: Tayi Ramaprasada Rao
- Succeeded by: Ballabh Singh

Personal details
- Profession: Lawyer, Judge

M. M. Ismail (8 February 1921 – 17 January 2005) was an Indian judge who served as Chief Justice of the Madras High Court and later as Acting Governor of Tamil Nadu.
