= List of governors of Tamil Nadu =

De jure head of the state of Tamil Nadu

Governor of Tamil Nadu
- Tamiḻnāṭu Āḷunar
- Emblem of Tamil Nadu

- Flag of India

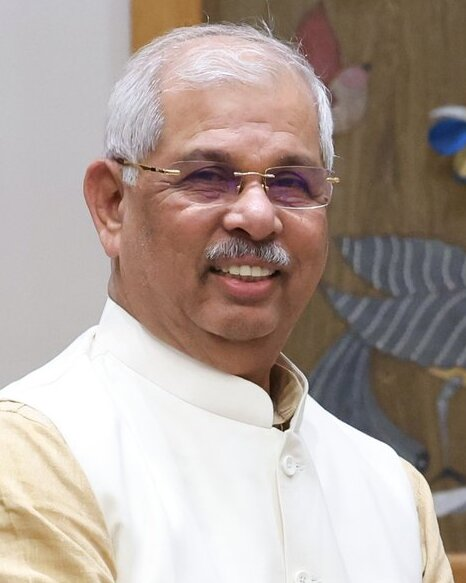
- Incumbent; Rajendra Arlekar since 12 March 2026
- Style: His Excellency
- Status: Head of state
- Reports to: President of India
- Residence: Lok Bhavan, Chennai; Lok Bhavan, Udhagamandalam
- Appointer: President of India
- Formation: 7 September 1948; 78 years ago
- First holder: Krishna Kumarsinhji Bhavsinhji (as Governor of Madras State); Ujjal Singh (as Governor of Tamil Nadu)
- Website: tnlokbhavan.gov.in

The governor of Tamil Nadu is the constitutional head of state of Tamil Nadu and the representative of the president of India in the state. In the state, the governor holds an important position in ensuring that the administration functions according to the constitution of India. They are appointed by the president and serve as the nominal executive authority of the state. The governor’s official residences are the Lok Bhavan, located in Chennai and Udhagamandalam. The governor performs various duties, such as giving assent to bills passed by the state legislative assembly, appointing the chief minister, and overseeing the constitutional functioning of the state government. Although the real executive power lies with the council of ministers headed by the chief minister, the governor plays a vital role in maintaining the constitutional framework and stability of the state administration.

The current incumbent is Rajendra Vishwanath Arlekar, who has been serving as an since 12 March 2026.

== Qualifications ==
Article 157 and Article 158 of the Constitution of India specify eligibility requirements for the post of governor. They are as follows:

A governor:

- must be at least 35 years of age.
- should not be a member of either the houses of the parliament or the house of the state legislature.
- should not hold any office of profit.

Traditionally, governors are not appointed to lead the states where they reside, although this is not stipulated in the constitution.

== Powers and functions ==
The governor has:

- Executive powers related to administration, appointments and removals
- Legislative powers related to lawmaking and the state legislative assembly and
- Discretionary powers are to be carried out according to the discretion of the Governor.

In his ex-officio capacity, the governor of Tamil Nadu is chancellor of the universities of Tamil Nadu as per the Acts of the Universities.

== Predecessor ==
Key

- ^{RES} Resigned
- ^{†} Died in office
- Acting / Additional Charge
- ^{§} Transferred

Governors of Madras Province
| # | Portrait | Name (born- died) | Home state | Tenure in office | | | Appointed by |
| # | Portrait | Name (born- died) | Home state | Took office | Left office | Time in office | Appointed by |
|---|---|---|---|---|---|---|---|
| 1 | | Archibald Nye (1895–1967) | Not applicable | 15 August 1947 | 6 September 1948 | 1 year, 22 days | Lord Mountbatten |
| 2 | | Krishna Kumarsinhji Bhavsinhji (1912–1965) | Gujarat | 7 September 1948 | 25 January 1950 | 1 year, 140 days | C. Rajagopalachari |

Development after independence

Madras State was a state in the Indian Republic, which was in existence during the mid-20th century as a successor to the Madras Province of British India. The state came into existence on 26 January 1950 when the Constitution of India was adopted and included the present-day Tamil Nadu and parts of neighbouring states of Andhra Pradesh, Karnataka, and Kerala till 1 November 1956, when the States Reorganisation Act, 1956 came into effect.

Governors of Madras State
| # | Portrait | Name (born- died) | Home state | Tenure office | | | Appointed by |
| # | Portrait | Name (born- died) | Home state | Took office | Left office | Time in office | Appointed by |
|---|---|---|---|---|---|---|---|
| 1 | | Krishna Kumarsinhji Bhavsinhji (1912–1965) | Gujarat | 26 January 1950 | 11 March 1952 | 2 years, 45 days | C. Rajagopalachari |
| 2 | | Sri Prakasa (1890–1971) | Uttar Pradesh | 12 March 1952 | 9 December 1956^{[§]} (Note: Transferred as the Governor of Bombay State) | 4 years, 272 days | Rajendra Prasad |
| 3 | | A. J. John (1893–1957) | Keralam | 10 December 1956 | 30 September 1957^{[†]} | 294 days | Rajendra Prasad |
| – | | P. V. Rajamannar (1901–1979) (Acting) | Tamil Nadu | 1 October 1957 | 24 January 1958 | 115 days | Rajendra Prasad |
| 4 | | Bishnu Ram Medhi (1888–1981) | Assam | 24 January 1958 | 3 May 1964 | 6 years, 100 days | Rajendra Prasad |
| 5 | | Jaya Chamaraja Wadiyar (1919–1974) | Karnataka | 4 May 1964 | 23 November 1964 | 203 days | Sarvepalli Radhakrishnan |
| – | | P. Chandra Reddy (1904–1976) (Acting) | Andhra Pradesh | 24 November 1964 | 7 February 1965 | 75 days | Sarvepalli Radhakrishnan |
| (5) | | Jaya Chamaraja Wadiyar (1919–1974) | Karnataka | 8 February 1965^{[§]} | 14 August 1965 | 187 days | Sarvepalli Radhakrishnan |
| – | | P. Chandra Reddy (1904–1976) (Acting) | Andhra Pradesh | 13 August 1965^{[§]} | 19 September 1965 | 37 days | Sarvepalli Radhakrishnan |
| (5) | | Jaya Chamaraja Wadiyar (1919–1974) | Karnataka | 20 September 1965^{[§]} | 3 January 1966 | 105 days | Sarvepalli Radhakrishnan |
| – | | P. Chandra Reddy (1904–1976) (Acting) | Andhra Pradesh | 4 January 1966^{[§]} | 27 June 1966 | 174 days | Sarvepalli Radhakrishnan |
| 6 | | Ujjal Singh (1895–1983) | Punjab | 28 June 1966 | 16 June 1967 | 2 years, 199 days | Sarvepalli Radhakrishnan |
| 6 | | Ujjal Singh (1895–1983) | Punjab | 17 June 1967 | 13 January 1969 | 2 years, 199 days | Zakir Husain |

Change in nomenclature

On 18 July 1967, the state legislative assembly unanimously adopted a resolution recommending that the state government take the necessary steps to secure an amendment to the Constitution of India aimed at changing the name of Madras State to Tamil Nadu. Consequently, the Madras State (Alteration of Name) Act, 1968 (Central Act 53 of 1968), was enacted by the Parliament of India and came into effect on 14 January 1969.

== Governors of Tamil Nadu (1969–present) ==
| # | Portrait | Name (born – died) | Home state | Tenure in office | | | Appointer (President) |
| # | Portrait | Name (born – died) | Home state | From | To | Time in office | Appointer (President) |
|---|---|---|---|---|---|---|---|
| 1 | | Ujjal Singh (1895–1983) | Punjab | 14 January 1969 | 25 May 1971 | 2 years, 131 days | Zakir Hussain |
| 2 | | Kodardas Kalidas Shah (1908–1986) | Gujarat | 26 May 1971 | 15 June 1976 | 5 years, 20 days | V. V. Giri |
| 3 | | Mohan Lal Sukhadia (1916–1982) | Rajasthan | 16 June 1976 | 8 April 1977^{[‡]} | 296 days | Fakhruddin Ali Ahmed |
| 4 | | Justice; P. Govindan Nair (Acting) | Kerala | 9 April 1977 | 26 April 1977 | 17 days | B. D. Jatti |
| 5 | | Prabhudas Patwari (1909–1985) | Gujarat | 27 April 1977 | 26 October 1980^{[‡]} | 3 years, 182 days | B. D. Jatti |
| 6 | | Justice; M. M. Ismail (1921–2005) (Acting) | Tamil Nadu | 27 October 1980 | 3 November 1980 | 7 days | Neelam Sanjiva Reddy |
| 7 | | Sadiq Ali (1910–2001) | Rajasthan | 4 November 1980 | 2 September 1982 | 1 year, 302 days | Neelam Sanjiva Reddy |
| 8 | | Sundar Lal Khurana; IAS (Retd) (1918–2007) | National Capital Territory of Delhi | 3 September 1982 | 16 February 1988 | 5 years, 166 days | Zail Singh |
| 9 | | P. C. Alexander; IAS (Retd) (1921–2011) | Kerala | 17 February 1988 | 23 May 1990^{[‡]} | 2 years, 95 days | Ramaswamy Venkataraman |
| 10 | | Surjit Singh Barnala (1925–2017) | Punjab | 24 May 1990 | 14 February 1991^{[‡]} | 266 days | Ramaswamy Venkataraman |
| 11 | | Bhishma Narain Singh (1933–2018) | Bihar | 15 February 1991 | 30 May 1993^{[‡]} | 2 years, 104 days | Ramaswamy Venkataraman |
| 12 | | Marri Chenna Reddy (1919–1996) | Andhra Pradesh | 31 May 1993 | 2 December 1996^{[†]} | 3 years, 185 days | Shankar Dayal Sharma |
| 13 | | Krishan Kant (1927–2002) (Additional charge) | Punjab | 2 December 1996 | 24 January 1997 | 53 days | Shankar Dayal Sharma |
| 14 | | Justice (Retd); M. Fathima Beevi (1927–2023) | Kerala | 25 January 1997 | 3 July 2001^{[‡]} | 4 years, 159 days | Shankar Dayal Sharma |
| 15 | | C. Rangarajan (born 1932) (Additional charge) | Tamil Nadu | 3 July 2001 | 17 January 2002 | 198 days | K. R. Narayanan |
| 16 | | P. S. Ramamohan Rao; IPS (Retd) (born 1934) | Andhra Pradesh | 18 January 2002 | 2 November 2004^{[‡]} | 2 years, 289 days | K. R. Narayanan |
| 17 | | Surjit Singh Barnala (1925–2017) | Punjab | 3 November 2004 | 30 August 2011 | 6 years, 300 days | A. P. J. Abdul Kalam |
| 18 | | Konijeti Rosaiah (1933–2021) | Andhra Pradesh | 31 August 2011 | 1 September 2016 | 5 years, 1 day | Pratibha Patil |
| 19 | | C. Vidyasagar Rao (born 1941) (Additional charge) | Telangana | 2 September 2016 | 5 October 2017 | 1 year, 33 days | Pranab Mukherjee |
| 20 | | Banwarilal Purohit (born 1940) | Maharashtra | 6 October 2017 | 17 September 2021^{[§]} (Note: Transferred as the Governor of Punjab and Administrator of Chandigarh) | 3 years, 346 days | Ram Nath Kovind |
| 21 | | R. N. Ravi; IPS (Retd) (born 1952) | Bihar | 18 September 2021 | 12 March 2026^{[§]} (Note: Transferred as the Governor of West Bengal) | 4 years, 175 days | Ram Nath Kovind |
| 22 | | Rajendra Arlekar (born 1954) | Goa | 12 March 2026 | 15 October 2026 | 222 days | Droupadi Murmu |
| 22 | | Rajendra Arlekar (born 1954) | Goa | 15 October 2026 | Incumbent | 222 days | Droupadi Murmu |

== See also ==
- History of Tamil Nadu
- Politics of Tamil Nadu
- Lok Bhavan, Chennai
- Elections in Tamil Nadu
- Chief Minister of Tamil Nadu
- List of current Indian governors
- Lok Bhavan, Udhagamandalam
- Tamil Nadu Legislative Assembly
- Deputy Chief Minister of Tamil Nadu
- Speaker of the Tamil Nadu Legislative Assembly
- Leader of the Opposition in the Tamil Nadu Legislative Assembly
- List of leaders of the house in the Tamil Nadu Legislative Assembly
