= Colley Harman Scotland =

Sir Colley Scotland

1st Chief Justice of Madras High Court
- In office 15 August 1862 – 1871
- Appointed by: Queen Victoria
- Preceded by: Position established
- Succeeded by: Walter Morgan; Adam Bittleston (acting)

Chief Justice of Supreme Court of Madras
- In office 24 May 1861 – 14 August 1862
- Appointed by: Queen Victoria
- Preceded by: Sir Henry Davison
- Succeeded by: Position abolished

Personal details
- Born: Colley Harman Scotland; 16 June 1818 Antigua, West Indies
- Died: 20 January 1903 (aged 84) Kensington, London
- Occupation: Lawyer, Judge
- Profession: Chief Justice

Sir Colley Harman Scotland (16 June 1818 – 20 January 1903) was the first Chief Justice of the Madras High Court in British India.

Scotland was born in the West Indies, the son of Thomas Scotland, Registrar of Antigua and deputy-paymaster of the British forces in Jamaica, and his wife, Sarah Haverkam.

He was called to the bar at the Middle Temple in 1843, and joined the Oxford Circuit. After the death of Sir Henry Davison, Scotland was in February 1861 appointed as Chief Justice of the Supreme Court of Madras, receiving at the same time the customary knighthood. He arrived at Madras on 23 May 1861 and was sworn in on 24 May 1861. In June the following year an act altered the courts, and he was reappointed as the first Chief Justice of the Madras High Court from 1862 to 1871. He also served as the Vice Chancellor of the University of Madras from 1862 to 1871.

Scotland married in 1854 a daughter of John Joseph Bygrave, but she died after only five years in 1859. He did not re-marry.

He died at his residence in Queen′s Gate Gardens, London, on 20 January 1903.
