= Tayi Ramaprasada Rao =

Indian Judge

14th Chief Justice of the Madras High Court
- In office 29 May 1978 – 5 November 1979
- Preceded by: Padmanbhapillay Govindan Nair
- Succeeded by: M. M. Ismail

Judge of the Madras High Court
- In office 1967 – 28 May 1978

Personal details
- Profession: Lawyer, Judge

Tayi Ramaprasada Rao was an Indian Judge and former Chief justice of Madras High Court.

== Career ==
Ramaprasada Rao practiced on the Original Side of the Madras High Court. He was a partner in law firm John and Rao Company, with knowledge of practice in commercial and corporate litigation. In 1967, he became a Judge of the Madras High Court. On 29 May 1978, Rao was appointed as the Chief Justice of the Madras High Court, succeeding P. Govindan Nair. Justice Rao
