= Charles Arthur Turner =

British jurist (1833–1907)

Sir Charles Arthur Turner KCIE

3rd Chief Justice of Madras High Court
- In office 3 March 1879 – 1885
- Appointed by: Queen Victoria
- Preceded by: Walter Morgan
- Succeeded by: Arthur Collins

Judge of Allahabad High Court
- In office 17 March 1866 – 2 March 1879
- Appointed by: Queen Victoria

Personal details
- Born: Charles Arthur Turner; 6 March 1833 Exeter, England
- Died: 20 October 1907 (aged 74) London
- Education: Exeter College, Oxford
- Occupation: Lawyer, Judge
- Profession: Chief Justice

Sir Charles Arthur Turner KCIE (6 March 1833 – 20 October 1907) was a British jurist mainly operational in Indian during the British colonial period, and was Chief Justice of Madras High Court. He was the first barrister judge appointed directly to the Allahabad High Court from England.

== Early life ==
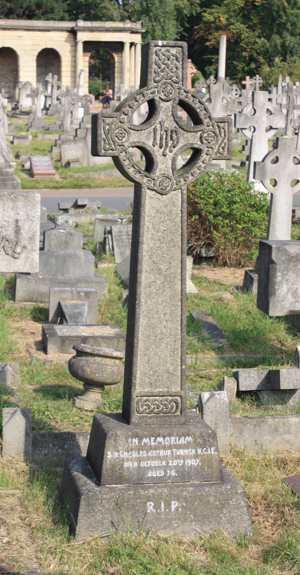
The grave of Sir Charles Arthur Turner, Brompton Cemetery

Turner was born to Reverend John Fisher Turner at Exeter, England. After completion of study at Exeter Grammar School and at Exeter College Oxford, he was called to the Bar by Lincoln's Inn in 1858.

== Career ==
He was appointed puisne Judge in Allahabad High Court on 17 March 1866 and served there for twelve years. On 3 March 1879 he became the Chief Justice of Madras High Court after Sir Walter Morgan and served since 1879 to 1885. He held the post of Vice-Chancellor of Madras University In 1880 and 1882. Sir Charles Turner also served as a member of the Law Commission of India and Public Service Commission with Sir Charles Umpherston Aitchison in 1886. He was awarded Knight Commander of the Order of the Indian Empire on 1 January 1888 on becoming Chief Justice. He became a judicial member as well as vice president of the Council of India. Turner died in London in 1907. He is buried in Brompton Cemetery between the central colonnades.
