= P. V. Rajamannar =

Indian jurist (1901–1979)

Justice P. V. Rajamannar
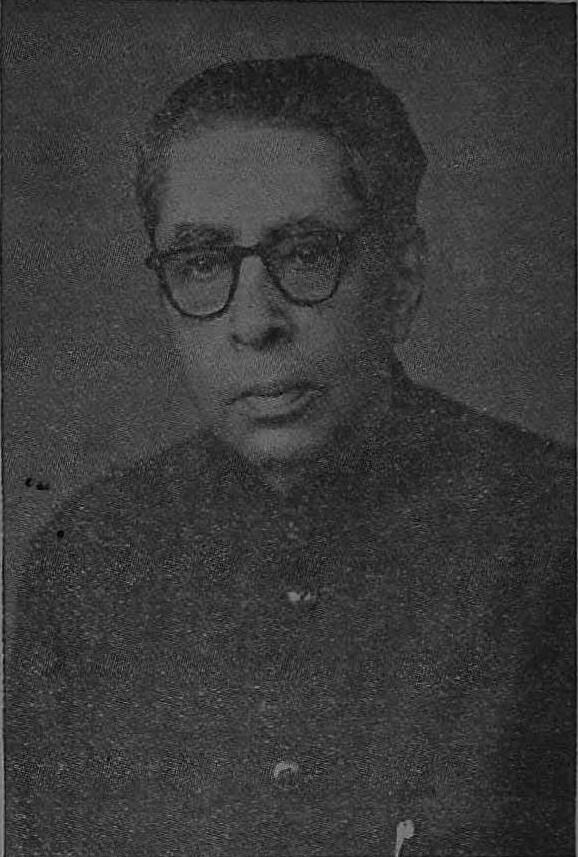

Chairman of Fourth Finance Commission of India
- In office 1966–1969
- Appointed by: S. Radhakrishnan
- Preceded by: A. K. Chanda
- Succeeded by: Mahavir Tyagi

12th Chief Justice of Madras High Court
- In office 22 April 1948 – 9 May 1961
- Appointed by: Lord Mountbatten
- Preceded by: Frederick Gentle
- Succeeded by: S. Ramachandra Iyer

Judge of Madras High Court
- In office 25 July 1945 – 19 April 1948
- Appointed by: George VI

Advocate General of Madras Presidency
- In office 1944–1945
- Appointed by: Arthur Hope
- Preceded by: Alladi Krishnaswamy Iyer
- Succeeded by: K. Rajah Iyer

Personal details
- Born: 1 May 1901
- Died: 1979 (aged 77–78)
- Education: Presidency College, Chennai (B.A., LL.B)
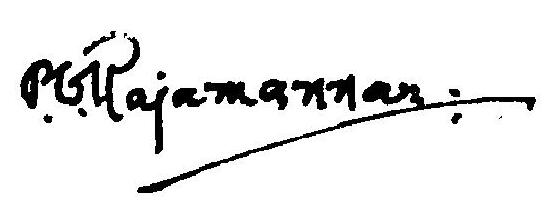
- Signature

Pakala Venkata Rajamannar (1901–1979) was an Indian judge who served as the first Indian Chief Justice of Madras High Court after independence from 1948 to 1961. He was also the first Chairman of Sangeet Natak Akademi in New Delhi. He also served as the acting Governor of Madras State from 1957 to 1958.

== Early life ==
P. V. Rajamannar was born to Dewan Bahadur P. Venkataramana Rao, an eminent lawyer who was a Madras High Court judge and later Chief Justice of Mysore High Court. He completed his schooling at Pachaiyappa's High School, Madras and did his graduation from the Presidency College, securing First Class in English and Philosophy in B.A in 1921. In B.L he won the Jurisprudence prize in 1923.

== Career in law ==
In 1924, Rajamannar started his law practice, joining his father's chambers. In 1944 P.V. Rajamannar was appointed Advocate-General of Madras, succeeding Alladi Krishnaswami Iyer, becoming one of the youngest Advocate-Generals, aged 43. He also appeared as the Public Prosecutor in one of the most sensational murder cases in South India, the Lakshmikanthan murder case involving two popular actors and a journalist with criminal history.

=== Chief Justice ===
On 25 July 1945, Rajamannar was appointed as the Judge of Madras High Court. On 22 April 1948 became the first Indian to be elevated as the permanent Chief Justice of Madras High Court. However, he was already serving as Acting Chief Justice of Madras High Court prior to his permanent appointment since 15 January 1948. He retired in 1961 and continued his active services for government by heading various committees.

== Other services ==
=== Finance Commission ===
During the years 1966-1969 P. V. Rajamannar was also the Chairman of Fourth Finance Commission of India.

In addition Rajamannar was also the chairman for the Fourth Law Commission and the Banking Laws Committee.

=== Educational Boards ===
P.V. Rajamannar was also the Chairman of Board of Studies of Law and Chaired the Board of Studies in Telugu at Sri Venkateswara University and Theater Art Faculty at Andhra University. He was also the Member of Syndicate of Madras University.

=== State Autonomy Committee ===
In 1969, P.V. Rajamannar was appointed the Chairman of a 3-member committee P.V. Rajamannar committee to study the State Autonomy and Centre-State relations by the then newly elected DMK government under its Chief Minister Dr. M. Karunanidhi.

== Arts and literature ==
In addition to his career in Law and administration P. V. Rajamannar was active in Arts and was the first appointed chairman of Sangeet Natak Akademi in New Delhi. During his college years and later he edited a Telugu literary journal called Kala and winning the Ramarayaninger Prize for a Telugu work Representative Government in Ancient India. In 1964, he was awarded the Sangeet Natak Akademi Fellowship the highest honour conferred by Sangeet Natak Akademi, India's National Academy for Music, Dance and Drama.

== Honours and legacy ==
P. V. Rajamannar was conferred Honorary Doctorates from Madras University, Andhra University and Annamalai University. Justice P V Rajamannar Salai (Road) in K. K. Nagar, Chennai is named in his honour. He acted as Governor of Madras on two occasions.

== Works and publications ==
- India: Republic Day 1956 (1956) – English - (Co-Author John Haynes Holmes, K. M. Panikkar, P. V. Rajamannar and N. C. Mehta)
- Aesthetic experience, (Sir George Stanley endowment lectures) (1960) - English
- Rajamannaru natikalu: Ayidu ekanka natikalu (1968) – Telugu
- Report on negotiable instruments law, 1975 (1976) - English
- Report on indigenous negotiable instruments (hundis), 1978 (1979) - English
- Report on personal property security law, 1977 (1978) - English
- First report of the Study Group Reviewing Legislation Affecting Banking: banking legislation (1971) - English
- Tamil Nadu Report, 1971 by P. V. Tamil Nadu Rajamannar (1971) - English

== Sources ==
- First Chairman, Dr P.V. Rajamannar
- "Metroplus First Indian Chief Justice High Court of Madras". hindu.com. 23 November 2007. Archived from the original on 3 December 2007.
- Article by DR. P. V. RAJAMANNAR on MODERNITY Vs. TRADITION IN INDIAN ART
- Telegraph article on States autonomy Committee
- Interstate Council's Rajamannar Committee
- Financial Commissions
- Ram, A. Janaki (1958). "Telugu Drama". Indian Literature. 1 (2): 133–139. JSTOR 23329304.
