= Fourth Finance Commission =

1964 finance commission of India

The Fourth Finance Commission of India was constituted on 18 May 1964, under the chairmanship of Dr. P. V. Rajamannar.

== Members ==
The members of the Commission were:

- Dr. P. V. Rajamannar, Chairman
- Shri Mohan Lal Gautam
- Shri D.G. Karve
- Prof. Bhabatosh Datta
- Shri P.C. Mathew, Member Secretary

The Commission suggested in its report that there should be greater co-ordination between the Centre and the States in common financial interests for which it recommended the establishment of a permanent organization in the Ministry of Finance.

== Recommendations ==
- Tax sharing and allocation of income tax and Union Excise Duties.
- Grants-in–aid to States in need of assistance, having regard to:
1. The revenue resources of States for five years ending with 1970–1971 on the basis of the levels of taxation likely to be reached at the end of 1965–66;
2. Creation of a fund out of Estate Duty proceeds over a specified limit, for repayment of State’s debt to the centre; and
3. Scope for economy with efficiency in States’ administrative expenditure.
- The changes to be made in the principles governing the distribution amongst the States of the grant to be made available to the States in lieu of taxes on railway fares;
- To study the combined incidence of Sales Tax and Union Excise Duties on the production, consumption or export of products, the duties on which are shareable with the State.
- The changes to be made in the principles governing the distribution of the net proceeds in any financial year of the additional excise duties levied on commodities – namely cotton fabrics, silk fabrics, woolen fabrics, sugar and tobacco – in replacement in the States’ tax formerly levied by the state governments.
