= Murray Coutts-Trotter =

British barrister (1874-1929)

Sir Murray Coutts-Trotter

8th Chief Justice of Madras High Court
- In office 3 June 1924 – 1929
- Appointed by: George V
- Preceded by: Walter Schwabe
- Succeeded by: Owen Beasley

Judge of Madras High Court
- In office January 1915 – 2 June 1924
- Appointed by: George V

Personal details
- Born: Victor Murray Coutts-Trotter; 12 May 1874 Newcastle upon Tyne, Northumberland, England
- Died: 12 May 1929 (aged 55) at sea
- Education: St. Paul's School, London, Balliol College, Oxford
- Occupation: lawyer, judge
- Profession: Chief Justice

Sir Victor Murray Coutts-Trotter (12 May 1874 – 12 May 1929) was a British barrister who was Chief Justice of the Madras High Court from 1924 to 1929 during the British colonial period.

== Biography ==
Son of Alexander Trotter, of Newcastle and London, Trotter was educated at St. Paul's School, London and Balliol College, Oxford, and called to the Bar from the Inner Temple. In 1901 he stood 1st class in classical Moderations and in the Final School of Humanities. Trotter won Hertford and Eldon Law Scholarships. He became assistant professor of Greek at the University of Liverpool in 1898. Trotter also served as Vinerian Professor of Law and Lecturer in Criminal Law and Evidence in Oxford. He worked under Justice Sir Walter George Salis Schwabe as a junior Barrister in the Madras Presidency. In January 1915 he became a puisne judge of the Madras High Court and was appointed Chief Justice on 3 June 1924. He was subsequently knighted in the 1924 Birthday Honours and resigned in 1929 due to ill-health; he died at sea on the journey back to England on his 55th birthday. He had married in 1905, Dorothy Evelyn Mary, daughter of Admiralty clerk George W. Godfrey (author of a one-act comic play, "My Milliner's Bill"). They had two sons and two daughters.
