= Percy Melmoth Walters =

English footballer (1863-1936)

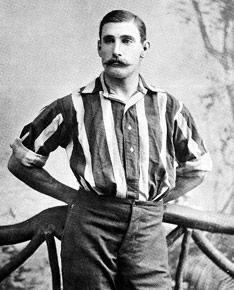

Personal information
- Full name: Percy Melmoth Walters
- Date of birth: 30 September 1863
- Place of birth: Ewell, England
- Date of death: 6 October 1936 (aged 73)
- Place of death: Ashtead, Surrey, England
- Positions: Right back; left back

Senior career*
Years	Team	Apps	(Gls)
1883–85	East Sheen		
1885	Oxford University		
1885–1892	Corinthian		
1885–1895(?)	Old Carthusians		

International career
1885–1890	England	13	(0)
- * Club domestic league appearances and goals

Percy Melmoth Walters (30 September 1863 – 6 October 1936) was an English amateur footballer who played as a defender for the Old Carthusians and the Corinthians in the late nineteenth century as well as making thirteen appearances for England, five as captain.

He and his younger brother, Arthur Melmoth Walters, were known as "morning" and "afternoon" in allusion to their initials. The brothers were generally regarded as the finest fullbacks in England for a number of years; according to Philip Gibbons in his "History of the Game from 1863 to 1900" this was due mainly to their own defensive system based on the combination game used by the Royal Engineers during the early 1870s.

== Education ==
Percy was born in Ewell, Surrey, the son of William Melmoth Walters, a solicitor, and attended Windlesham House School, then Charterhouse School, although he did not play for the latter's football team. He went up to Oriel College, Oxford, where he won a blue in 1885, when his brother was in the Cambridge team.

== Football career ==
=== Corinthian ===
In his final year at Oxford, Walters followed his younger brother and joined the Corinthian club which had been established three years earlier with a view to giving amateur players the opportunity to play together on a regular basis to improve the quality and strength of the England team.

Percy joined the Easter tour in which five games were played in six days, playing in all five games, including the opening fixture against Preston North End on 6 April 1885, when he played at right-back with his brother Arthur alongside him on the left.

This match was the first of many over the next six years in which the two brothers played alongside each other as the two full backs. Amongst the more significant matches were a 6–0 defeat of the FA Cup holders, Blackburn Rovers, in December 1885 and a 7–0 victory over Notts County in March 1886, when fellow Old Carthusian William Cobbold scored four goals.

The brothers' final match together for Corinthian was on 8 November 1890 in an eight-goal victory over Sheffield in which younger brother H.M. Walters (who was only playing his second match) scored a hat-trick, with another goal from Percy. The other four goals came from V.G. Manns, who was playing his only match for Corinthian. Shortly after this match, the younger brother died from a football injury inflicted during a match and, in deference to their parents' wishes, both brothers retired from football to concentrate on their legal careers.

The withdrawal of the Walters brothers from the Corinthian team had a significant effect on the team's performances as they were "extremely hard to replace, and Corinthian were destined to win only six of their next nineteen games".

Despite the promise made to their parents, the brothers made a return to the Corinthians for a multi-sport tournament against the Barbarians rugby club in April 1892, although Percy did not play in the soccer match which Corinthian won 6–0, with Tinsley Lindley scoring a hat-trick. The clubs also played a rugby match, which Corinthian won 16–13, although the match was not a very serious encounter and was described by The Times newspaper as "a very amusing game". The rugby match was followed by an athletics meeting in which C. B. Fry was prominent, winning both the long jump and high jump. Finally, the two clubs met a few weeks later in a cricket match in which Percy played alongside several other prominent Corinthians, including Fry, Lindley and Charles Wreford-Brown.

During his time with the Corinthians, Walters made 54 appearances, scoring once.

=== Old Carthusians ===
After graduating in 1885, Walters joined the old-boys' team for his former school, the Old Carthusians. His major success came late in his time with the club, reaching the FA Amateur Cup final in 1895.

=== England ===
Percy and Arthur made their England debuts together on 28 February 1885 in a 4–0 victory over Ireland, with Percy at left back and Arthur on the right.

He first captained the England team, in only his third appearance, against Ireland on 13 March 1886, in the absence of the regular captain, Norman Coles Bailey. England "totally dominated the Irish" to record a 6–1 victory, with four goals from Benjamin Spilsbury.

In the next match against Scotland on 27 March 1886, nine of the eleven players selected were members of the Corinthian club, although all had their primary affiliation with other clubs. The match ended in a 1–1 draw, with England's being scored by fellow Corinthian Tinsley Lindley.

On 17 March 1888, Percy played at left-back (alongside Bob Howarth of Preston North End) when England achieved their first victory over Scotland since 1879. In "a brilliant display of attacking football" England were 5–0 winners, including two goals from Fred Dewhurst, thus securing their first victory on Scottish soil.

Percy made a total of thirteen appearances for England, five as captain, with his final match being against Scotland in the 1890 British Home Championship. The match ended 1–1, and as a result England and Scotland shared the championship. Of the thirteen matches played for England, eight were won, three drawn (all against Scotland) and two were lost (also against Scotland).

=== Other ===
During his football career, Walters also played for East Sheen and Epsom in 1884 and 1885, was a founder member of Ewell F.C. together with his brother and John Henry Bridges in 1890 and also represented Surrey. He was a member of the F.A. committee in 1886, and a vice-president from 1891 to 1892.

== Life away from football ==
Whilst at Oxford University, Walters made one appearance for the university cricket team in a match against the M.C.C. in May 1885, when he was the wicket-keeper. In his one innings, he scored nine runs in a drawn match.

Walters qualified as a barrister and was called to the bar in 1888. On top of his profession, he also served in the army as a volunteer and had been commissioned a lieutenant in the 3rd Surrey Rifle Volunteer Corps in June 1886 . During World War I he served as a second lieutenant (acting captain) in the Inns of Court OTC.

He died on 6 October 1936 at Ashtead, Surrey (aged 73 years).

== Sporting honours ==
Old Carthusians

- FA Amateur Cup finalists: 1895.
