= J. E. P. Wallis =

British lawyer and judge (1861–1946)

The Right Honourable Sir John Edward Power Wallis

6th Chief Justice of Madras High Court
- In office November 1914 – 1921
- Appointed by: George V
- Preceded by: C. A. White
- Succeeded by: Walter Schwabe

Judge of Madras High Court
- In office 1907 – November 1914; Acting CJ : July 1914 - November 1914
- Appointed by: Edward VII

Advocate-General of Madras
- In office 1900–1906
- Preceded by: C. A. White; V. B. Aiyangar (acting)
- Succeeded by: C. Sankaran Nair

Personal details
- Born: 3 November 1861 Marylebone, London, England
- Died: 8 June 1946 (aged 84) Brighton, Sussex
- Occupation: lawyer, judge
- Profession: Advocate-General, Chief Justice

Sir John Edward Power Wallis (3 November 1861 – 8 June 1946) was a British lawyer who served as the Advocate-General of the Madras Presidency from 1900 to 1906, and Chief Justice of the Madras High Court from 1914 to 1921.

== Early life and education ==
Wallis was born in 1861, son of John Edward Wallis, of Alexandria, Egypt, formerly of London and the Inner Temple, Judge in the Mixed Tribunals (International Court of Justice), Cairo and sometime editor and proprietor of the Catholic weekly The Tablet. He was educated at Ushaw College, Durham, and the University of London (M.A.), and was called to the bar in 1886 from the Middle Temple.

He served for some time as a reader in Madras before being appointed the Advocate-General of the Madras Presidency in January 1900, succeeding C. A. White.

== Legal career ==
Wallis served as the Advocate-General of the Madras Presidency from 1900 to 1906. He was also nominated to the Madras Legislative Council and served as an ex-officio member from 1904 to 1906. In 1907, Wallis was appointed judge of the Madras High Court and officiated as Chief Justice from July to October 1914. In November 1914, his appointment as Chief Justice of the High Court was confirmed, and he served as such until 1921. On 19 August 1926, he was appointed to the Judicial Committee of the Privy Council.

He was a Fellow of All Souls, Oxford and Vice-Chancellor of Madras University in 1908. In 1903, he married Dorothea Margaret, daughter of William Richardson Fowke.
