= Owen Beasley =

9th Chief Justice of Madras High Court

Sir Horace Owen Compton Beasley OBE

9th Chief Justice of Madras High Court
- In office 1929–1937
- Appointed by: George V
- Preceded by: Murray Coutts-Trotter
- Succeeded by: Lionel Leach

Judge of Madras High Court
- In office 1924–1929
- Appointed by: George V

Judge of Burma High Court
- In office 1923–1924
- Appointed by: George V

Personal details
- Born: 2 July 1877 Chiswick, London, England
- Died: 1 January 1960 (aged 82)
- Occupation: lawyer, judge
- Profession: Chief Justice

Sir Horace Owen Compton Beasley OBE (2 July 1877 – 1 January 1960) was the Chief Justice of the Madras High Court in British India from 1929 to 1937.

== Biography ==
The son of Ammon Beasley, general manager of the Taff Vale Railway Company, Owen Beasley was born at Chiswick, and educated at Westminster and Jesus College, Cambridge (B.A. 1899). He was called to the Bar from the Inner Temple in 1902, and worked on the South Western Circuit.

He was a puisne judge of the High Court of Burma from 1923 to 1924, then at Madras from 1924 to 1929; he was appointed Chief Justice of the Madras High Court in 1929, serving in that capacity until 1937.

It was said of him that "the Madras bar never lost faith in his sense of justice and honesty of purpose..." and that he had an "uncompromising sense of duty and utter disregard for personal distinction between lawyers", observing also his "imperial attitude of benevolent despotism".

Beasley served in World War I, first as a 2nd Lieutenant in the Royal Welch Fusiliers, then as a Captain in the Cameronians (Scottish Rifles), and as a Major in the Labour Corps. He was appointed OBE in 1919, and knighted in 1930. He was married with children, and lived at Bullingham Mansions, Pitt Street, London.
