= Christopher Rawlinson (judge) =

English colonial judge (1806–1888)

Sir Christopher Rawlinson

Chief Justice of the Madras High Court
- In office 1850–1859
- Preceded by: Sir Edward John Gambier
- Succeeded by: Sir Henry Davison

Personal details
- Born: 10 July 1806 Combe, Hampshire, England
- Died: 28 March 1888 (aged 81) Eaton Square, London, England
- Occupation: lawyer, judge
- Profession: Chief Justice

Sir Christopher Rawlinson (10 July 1806 – 28 March 1888) was an English colonial judge who was Chief Justice of Madras and the first vice-chancellor of the University of Madras.

Rawlinson was born at Combe, Hampshire, the second son of police magistrate John Rawlinson (1777/8–1847) of New Place, Alresford, and of Clatford and Combe, Hampshire, by his wife Felicia, daughter of Thomas Watson, of Haydon Hall, Middlesex. He was educated at the Charterhouse and at Trinity College, Cambridge (B.A. 1828, M.A. 1831). Called to the bar at the Middle Temple (as his father had been) in 1831, he joined the western circuit in 1832, and was recorder of Portsmouth from 1840 to 1847, when he was appointed recorder of Prince of Wales Island, Singapore, and Malacca. In 1847 he was knighted.

In 1849 he was appointed Chief Justice of the Supreme Court of Judicature at Madras, and held that position till his retirement in 1859. In his charge to the grand jury on 5 January 1859 he expressed the belief that great benefits would accrue from the recent transfer of the government of India from the East India Company to the Crown, and refuted the assertion then commonly made by English officials in India, that no materials for self-government existed in the country. On 9 February 1859 he was presented with a farewell address by the native community of Madras at an entertainment at which the governor, Lord Harris, was present.

In 1842 he published a work on "The Municipal Practices Act".

He died at 33 Eaton Square, London, on 28 March 1888. On 27 May 1847 he had married Georgina Maria, younger daughter of Alexander Radclyffe Sidebottom, barrister, by whom he had three sons—Christopher (b. 1850), Albemarle Alexander, late major 8th Hussars, John Frederick Peel—and one daughter. His nephew by marriage was William Melmoth Walters, whose daughter Gertrude married Rawlinson's nephew Thomas Arthur Rawlinson and was mother of the screenwriter and film producer A. R. Rawlinson.
