= Lok Bhavan, Ooty =

Residence of the Governor of Tamil Nadu

Lok Bhavan, Udhagamandalam
- Interactive map of the Lok Bhavan, Udhagamandalam area

General information
- Type: Summer residence
- Coordinates: 11.421768°N 76.710754°E
- Owner: Government of Tamil Nadu

References
- Website

Lok Bhavan formerly Raj Bhavan (translation: Government House) of Ooty is the summer residence of the Governor of Tamil Nadu. It is located in the city of Ooty, Tamil Nadu.

== History ==
In 1876, the government decided to purchase Upper Norwood and Lower Norwood, which belonged to the trustees of Lawrence Asylum and started efforts for the establishment of the Government House at Ootacamund. Richard Temple-Grenville, 3rd Duke of Buckingham and Chandos, who initiated the purchase, took possession of both the Upper and Lower Norwood and the Garden Cottage. But after a single stay, the Governor was convinced that the Upper Norwood was not a fit residence. Soon after returning to Madras, the Duke proposed the building of a large two storeyed building which can afford complete accommodation for the family and provide public reception rooms. Between 1878 and 1881, various estimates were prepared and a final estimate for the construction of Government House at a cost of Rs.4,02,914/- was approved. But this estimate did not contain the cost of furnishing the building and hence a further comprehensive estimate was prepared in July 1888 for an amount of Rs.7,79,150/-. Finally, the Government House was constructed at a cost of Rs.7,82,633/-.

In 1899, a Ball room with an ante-room was added to the Government House and in 1904 electrical installation for the whole premises was approved and installed. During the period of construction of the Government House, the Duke of Buckingham resided at Upper Norwood and was constantly inspecting the work, altering the plans and making suggestions. Sir Arthur Havelock considerably improved the interior of the original building especially the very fine and handsome Ball room. After Independence, the Government House was renamed as Raj Bhavan.

== Building ==
The present area of Raj Bhavan is 86.72 acres (350,900 m^{2}). The main building has a plinth area of 29,505 sq ft (2,741.1 m^{2}). And it consists of a large Banqueting Hall, ball room, Drawing and Reception rooms, besides 17 Guest rooms and office rooms. The elevation of Raj Bhavan is 2,303 meters above mean-sea level and enjoys a warm, temperate climate with an average rainfall of 1,400 mm per year.

The famous Banquet Hall of Raj Bhavan was given a complete face lift in 1988, in association with the Indian National Trust for Art and Cultural Heritage (INTACH) and the National Research Laboratory for Conservation of Cultural property, Lucknow. The Embossed canvas, which was damaged, has been restored.

== Gardens ==
Raj Bhavan Gardens consists of ornamental gardens in an area of about 9 acres (36,000 m^{2}), a rich lawn on 3 acres (12,000 m^{2}), four rosaries, two lily ponds, a sunken garden, two green houses, a vegetable garden and a nursery.

== See also ==
- Government Houses of the British Indian Empire
