= Lok Bhavan, Chennai =

Official residence of the Governor of Tamil Nadu

- Makkaḷ Māḷikai, Ceṉṉai
- Interactive map of the Lok Bhavan, Chennai area

General information
- Location: Lok Bhavan, Guindy, Chennai – 600022, Tamil Nadu, India
- Coordinates: 13.005948°N 80.226565°E
- Owner: Government of Tamil Nadu

Design and construction
- Designations: Governor of Tamil Nadu

Other information
- Parking: Available

Website
- Lok Bhavan, Chennai

Lok Bhavan formerly Raj Bhavan, the official residence of the governor of Tamil Nadu, is located in Chennai, the capital city of the state. The campus comprises the Governor’s residence, the Lok Bhavan offices, and quarters for officers and staff.

Lok Bhavan features a collection of architecturally distinctive buildings, including the spacious Bharathiar Mandapam, along with expansive lawns where state and official functions, as well as meetings, are held. It also includes suites for VVIPs such as the president, the vice president, the prime minister, and other eminent national dignitaries.

The governor also has an official residence at Udhagamandalam (Ooty), surrounded by verdant greenery and blooming flowers. This estate includes palatial buildings, a splendid banquet hall, and various artefacts.

== See also ==
- Government Houses of the British Indian Empire
- List of Tamil Nadu Government Estates, Complexes, Buildings and Structures
