= Palapatti Sadaya Goundar Kailasam =

Indian Judge

Palapatti Sadaya Goundar Kailasam (12 September 1915 – 10 August 1986) was a former Chief Justice of Madras High Court and judge of the Supreme Court of India.

== Career ==
Kailasam was born in the Palapatti Zamindar family of the undivided Salem district, now in the Namakkal district, Tamil Nadu. He passed B.Sc. in Botany from Presidency College, Madras in 1935. In 1937, he completed his law degree from Madras Law College. He was appointed public prosecutor of Madras High Court in 1960 and also worked as acting Advocate general for a few days. Kailasam became a permanent judge of this High Court on 20 October 1960 and was elevated to the post of Chief Justice on 8 April 1976. Justice Kailasam was appointed a judge of the Supreme Court in 1977 as the first Chief Justice of Madras who accepted the appointment to Supreme Court of India. He retired on 12 September 1980.

== Family ==
Justice Kailasam married the Tamil poet Soundra Kailasam. Their daughter's name is Nalini Chidambaram, wife of P. Chidambaram, former Union Minister of India.
