= Madras High Court =

High court in the Indian state of Tamil Nadu

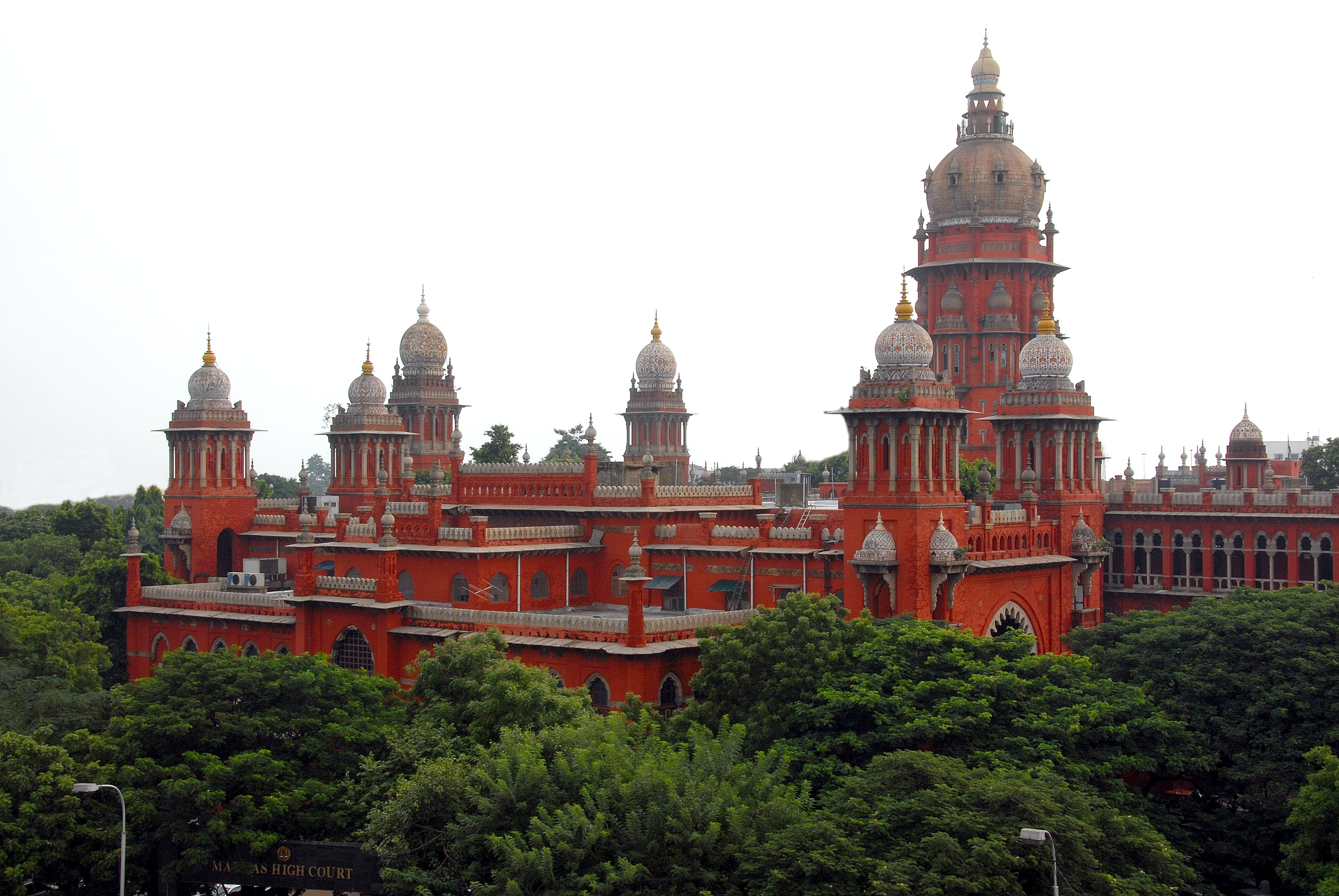
- Madras High Court building
- Interactive map of Madras High Court
- 13°05′12.8″N 80°17′16.4″E
- Established: 26 June 1862; 164 years ago
- Jurisdiction: Tamil Nadu and Puducherry
- Location: Chennai (primary bench); Madurai (additional bench)
- Coordinates: 13°05′12.8″N 80°17′16.4″E
- Motto: Satyameva Jayate
- Composition method: Presidential with confirmation of Chief Justice of India and Governor of respective state
- Authorised by: Constitution of India
- Appeals to: Supreme Court of India
- Appeals from: Subordinate courts of Tamil Nadu
- Judge term length: Mandatory retirement at age 62
- Number of positions: 75
- Language: English, Tamil
- Website: hcmadras.tn.gov.in

Chief Justice
- Currently: S. A. Dharmadhikari
- Since: 6 March 2026

The Madras High Court is an Indian High Court with appellate jurisdiction over the state of Tamil Nadu and the union territory of Puducherry. It also exercises original jurisdiction over the city of Chennai and has the power to issue writs under the Constitution of India. It is located in Chennai and has an additional bench at Madurai.

The Madras High Court was one of the three charter High Courts established by the Letters Patent granted by the British Crown on 26 June 1862, and replaced the Supreme Court of Madras, which had exercised jurisdiction over the city since 1817. It is one of the oldest High Courts in India. After Indian independence, the High Court was recognised as an appellate authority under the Constitution of India, adopted on 26 January 1950.

From 1862 to 1892, the High Court functioned in a makeshift building. The primary court complex in Chennai was officially inaugurated on 12 July 1892 and is one of the largest in the world. The Madurai Bench was established on 24 July 2004 and functions from a dedicated court complex in Madurai. The court has a sanctioned strength of 75 judges, including the Chief Justice.

== History ==
In the early 18th century, a Major's Court was established in Madras, which administered English law for the British settlements. From 1817 to 1862, the Supreme Court of Madras was the primary court of Madras. In 1861, the British parliament enacted the Indian High Courts Act and the Indian Councils Act, which abolished the existing Supreme Courts and the Sadr Diwani Adalat, and gave power to the English crown to establish High Courts in India. The Madras High Court was one of three charter high courts established by the letters patent granted by the English crown on 26 June 1862, and is one of the oldest high courts established in India. The order was further modified with the issuance of a fresh letters patent in 1865.

After Indian independence, the high court was recognised as one of the appellate authorities as laid down by the Constitution of India, which was adopted on 26 January 1950. While the city of Madras was renamed to Chennai in 1996, the court continued to function under the older name. Though the Tamil Nadu Legislative Assembly passed a resolution appealing to the union government to rename the court as High Court of Tamil Nadu in 2017, the name has remained the same. The Madurai Bench of the Madras High Court was established on 24 July 2004. The Tamil Nadu State Judicial Academy, funded by the Government of Tamil Nadu, was established in April 2001 under the aegis of the Madras High Court, to train judicial officers.

== Jurisdiction ==
The Madras High Court has appellate jurisdiction over the state of Tamil Nadu and the union territory of Puducherry. It also exercises original jurisdiction over the city of Chennai, and for the issue of writs under the Constitution of India. Apart from civil and criminal courts, it has courts for small causes, labour affairs, industrial tribunal, transport appellate tribunal, and other special courts. The Madurai bench of the high court handles appellate cases related to the fourteen districts–Kanyakumari, Tirunelveli, Thoothukudi, Tenkasi, Madurai, Dindigul, Ramanathapuram, Virudhunagar, Theni, Sivaganga, Pudukottai, Thanjavur, Tiruchirappalli, and Karur districts of Tamil Nadu.

== Court complex ==
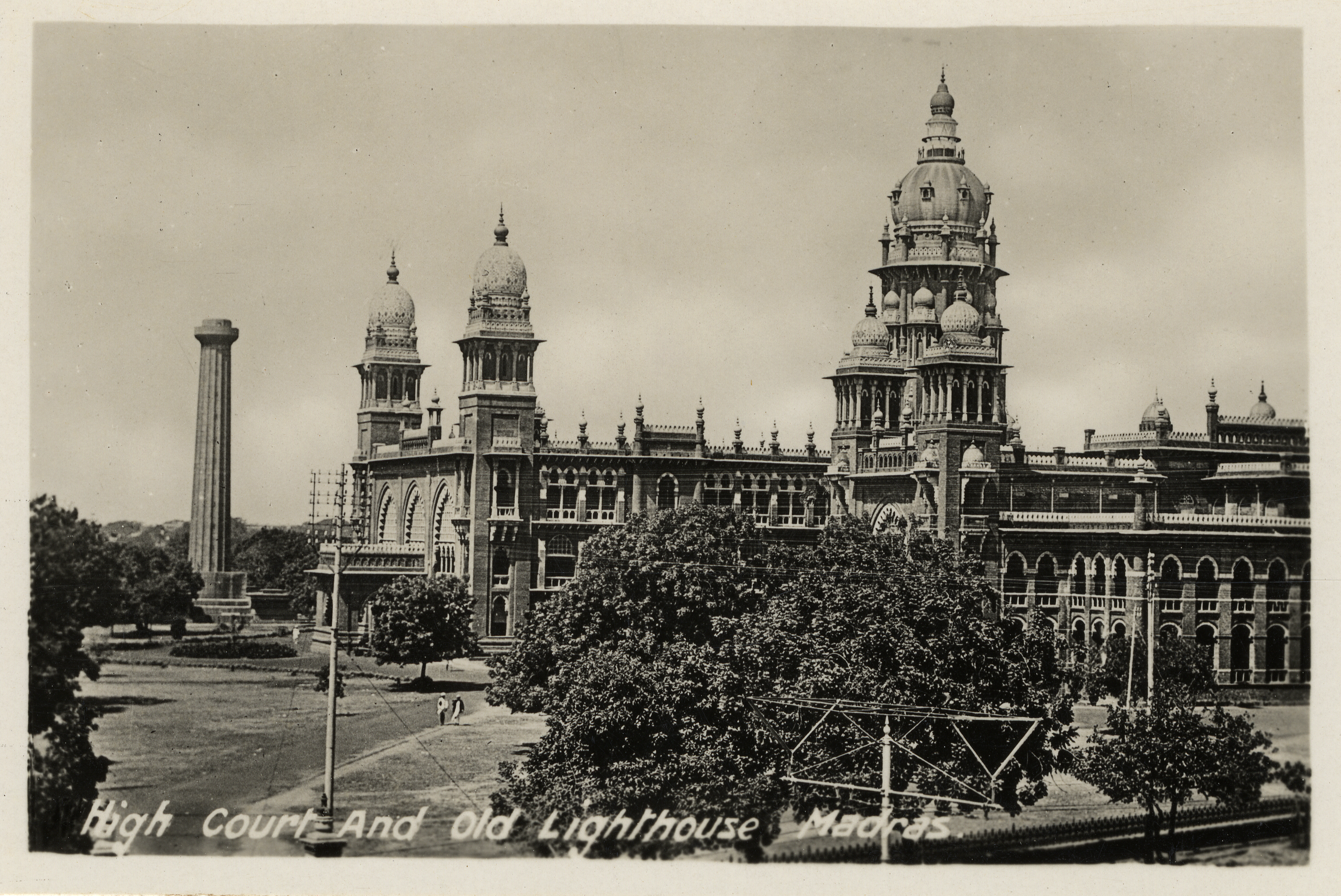
The High Court complex (right) and the light house (c.1920)

From 1862 to 1892, the High Court functioned in a building in Periamet, which earlier housed the Supreme Court of Madras and the collector office. Construction on the new court complex at George Town began in October 1888. The building was designed in Indo-Saracenic architecture by J. W. Brassington and later expanded under the guidance of Henry Irwin. As per the original plan, 11 court halls were planned in the main building at an estimate of ₹0.95 million (equivalent to ₹500 million or US$5.4 million in 2026). Of these 11 court halls, six were meant for the High Court, four for the small causes court and one for the civil court. An additional building to host the lawyers, which was connected to the main building.

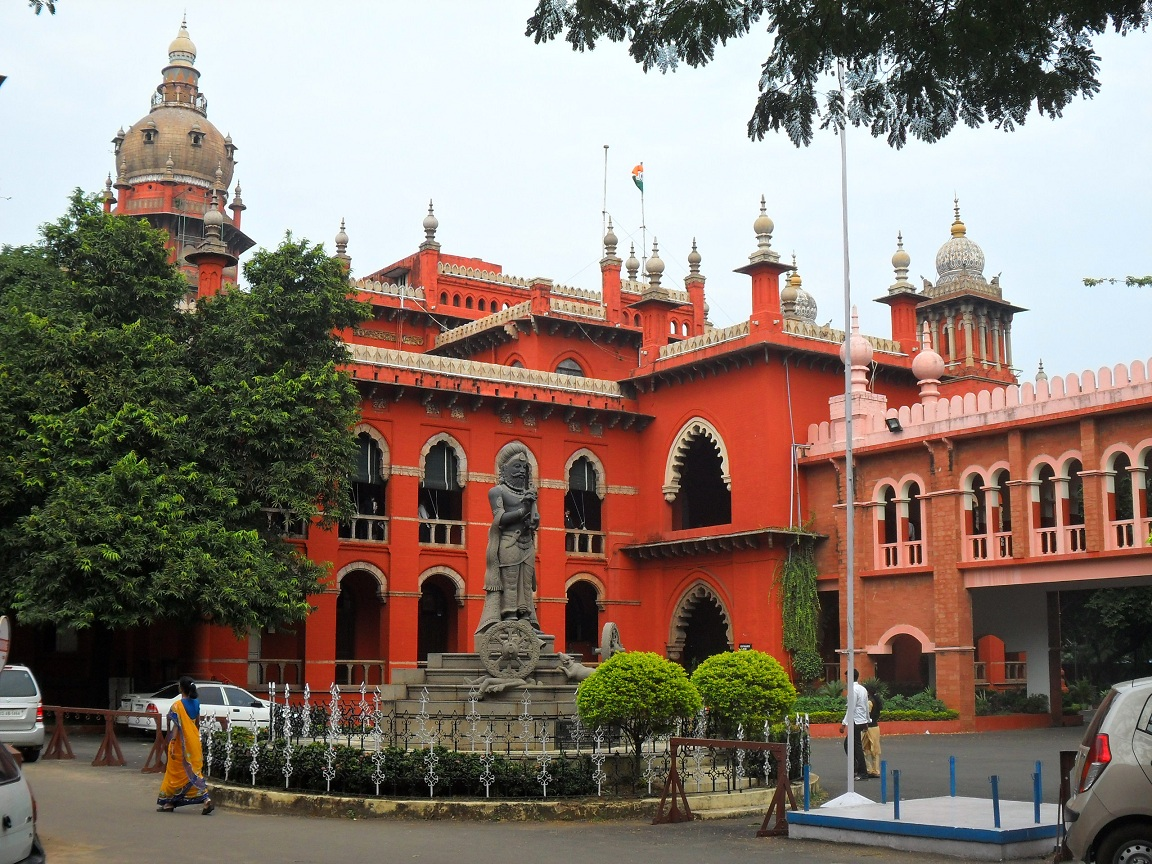
The main building of the High Court

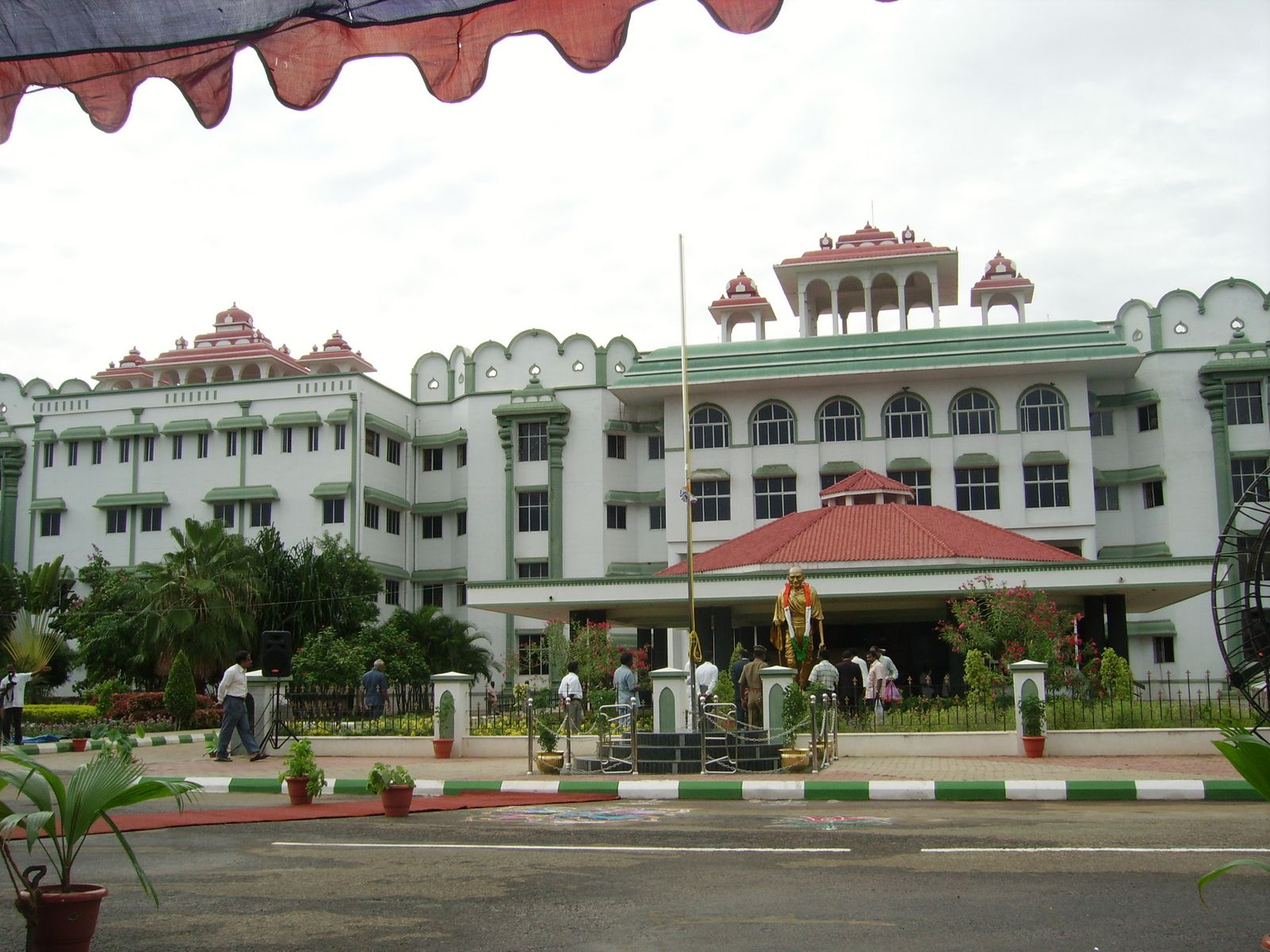
The Madurai bench of the High Court

Located close to the Chennai harbour, the court premises already incorporated a lighthouse, which was raised to a height of 175 ft (53 m) during the construction of the courthouse. Most of the material for the construction were sourced locally except the steel and ornamental tiles, and local artisans were used for the work. When the construction was completed in 1892, the cost had risen to ₹12.98 million (equivalent to ₹5.5 billion or US$58 million in 2026). It was officially inaugurated on 12 July 1892, by Beilby Lawley, then Governor of Madras, who handed over the key to the Chief Justice Arthur Collins. It is one of the largest court complexes in the world by area.

During the First World War, the high court building was damaged when SMS Emden, a German light cruiser attacked the port on 22 September 1914. The old lighthouse was closed in the later 20th century after a new lighthouse was added at the southern end of the Marina beach. The complex was subsequently expanded, and the civil and other courts were subsequently shifted to other buildings on the campus, and the main building is exclusively used by the high court.

The Madurai bench of the high court consists of a four storied building spread across 22,929 m^{2} (246,810 sq ft), which houses the offices, and a two storied court building, spread across 15,209 m^{2} (163,710 sq ft), which hosts 24 court halls, and the judges' chambers.

== Composition ==
The court is led by a Chief Justice and has a sanctioned strength of 75 judges including the chief justice. The current chief justice is Manindra Mohan Shrivastava, who was appointed in July 2025. The judges of the court are led by orderlies who bear a ceremonial mace made of silver, a practice from the British era, which has been abadnoned in most high courts and the Supreme Court of India.

== Publications ==
The Madras Law Journal was started in 1891, by a group of lawyers from the Madras Bar, based on an idea developed during a meet at S. Subramania Iyer's house. The journal published the judgements of the Madras High Court, along with notes and reviews of books. It is the oldest law journal in India. It was sold to Wadhwa publications in 2006, which was taken over by LexisNexis later. The Law Weekly, started in 1914, also reports the judgments of the high court.

== Notable judgments ==
=== Uphold the right to life of children with disabilities ===
In a significant development, the Court in, S.Muneeswaran and Another v. State, recognized that a child with an intellectual disability has equal right to life irrespective of the challenges associated with raising the child, the Court noted:

No one has the right to take the law into their own hands and extinguish the life of another person. Even today, many parents make immense sacrifices, and even lay down their lives, for children born with disabilities...

— G.K. Ilanthiraiyan and R. Poornima, S.Muneeswaran and Another vs. State, Para 26

== List of judges ==
=== Former Chief Justices ===
No.	Judge	Term start	Term end
Supreme Court of Madras
1	Thomas Strange	1801	1816
2	John Newbolt	1816	1820
3	Edmond Stanley	1820	1825
4	Ralph Palmer	1825	1835
5	Robet Comyn	1835	1842
6	Edward Gambier	1842	1850
7	Christopher Rawlinson	1850	1859
8	Henry Davison	1859	1860
9	Colley Scotland	1860	14 August 1862
Madras High Court
9	Colley Harman Scotland	15 August 1862	21 November 1871
10	Walter Morgan	22 November 1871	7 February 1879
11	Charles Turner	3 March 1879	1885
12	Arthur Collins	1885	1899
13	Charles White	1899	July 1914
14	John Wallis	November 1914	1921
15	Walter Schwabe	1921	1924
16	Murray Coutts-Trotter	3 June 1924	12 May 1929
17	Owen Beasley	1929	1937
18	Lionel Leach	1937	1947
19	Frederick Gentle	12 July 1947	19 April 1948
20	P. V. Rajamannar	20 April 1948	9 May 1961
21	S. Ramachandra Iyer	16 September 1961	1 November 1964
22	P. C. Reddy	23 November 1964	30 June 1966
23	M. Anantanarayanan	1 July 1966	30 April 1969
24	K. Veeraswami	1 May 1969	11 March 1976
25	P. S. Kailasam	8 April 1976	2 January 1977
26	Padmanbhapillay Govindan Nair	3 January 1977	28 May 1978
27	Tayi Ramaprasada Rao	29 May 1978	5 November 1979
28	M. M. Ismail	6 November 1979	9 July 1981
29	Ballabh Singh	12 March 1982	24 January 1984
30	Madhukar Chandurkar	2 April 1984	13 March 1988
31	Shanmughasundaram Mohan	19 October 1989	25 October 1989
32	Adarsh Anand	1 November 1989	17 November 1991
33	Kanta Kumari	15 June 1992	14 November 1992
34	K. Annadanayya Swamy	1 July 1993	19 March 1997
35	Manmohan Singh	1 July 1997	27 December 1998
36	Ashok Agrawal	24 May 1999	26 August 1999
37	K. G. Balakrishnan	9 September 1999	7 June 2000
38	Nagendra Jain	13 September 2000	30 August 2001
39	B. Subhashan Reddy	12 September 2001	20 November 2004
40	Markandey Katju	28 November 2004	10 October 2005
41	Ajit Shah	12 November 2005	9 May 2008
42	Ashok Ganguly	19 May 2008	15 December 2008
43	Hemant Gokhale	9 March 2009	28 April 2010
44	M. Y. Iqbal	11 June 2010	23 December 2012
45	Rajesh Agrawal	24 October 2013	16 February 2014
46	Sanjay Kaul	26 July 2014	16 February 2017
47	Indira Banerjee	5 April 2017	6 August 2018
48	V. K. Tahilramani	12 August 2018	6 September 2019
49	Amreshwar Sahi	11 November 2019	31 December 2020
50	Sanjib Banerjee	4 January 2021	16 November 2021
51	M. N. Bhandari	14 February 2022	12 September 2022
52	Sanjay Gangapurwala	28 May 2023	23 May 2024
53	K. R. Shriram	27 September 2024	20 July 2025
54	M. M. Shrivastava	21 July 2025	5 March 2026
55	S. A. Dharmadhikari	6 March 2026	Incumbent

== Judges elevated as Chief Justices ==
This sections contains list of only those judges elevated as chief justices whose parent high court is Madras. This includes those judges who, at the time of appointment as chief justice, may not be serving in Madras High Court but this list does not include judges who at the time of appointment as chief justice were serving in Madras High Court but does not have Madras as their Parent High Court.

Colour Key

- Female Chief Justice
- Served as Chief Justice of India

Symbol Key

- ^{‡} Elevated to Supreme Court of India
- ^{RES} Resigned
- ^{†} Died in office

Name	Image	Appointed as CJ in HC of	Date of appointment		Date of retirement (Note: Includes date of resignation, death and elevation to the Supreme Court)	Tenure		Ref.
Name	Image	Appointed as CJ in HC of	As Judge	As Chief Justice	Date of retirement	As Chief Justice	As Judge (Note: Includes tenure as Chief Justice)	Ref.
J. E. P. Wallis		Madras	1907	November 1914	1921			
Murray Coutts-Trotter		Madras	January 1915	3 June 1924	1929^{[RES]}			
Gilbert Stone		Nagpur	1930	9 January 1936	1943			
Frederick Gentle		Madras	1936	12 July 1947	19 April 1948^{[RES]}	283 days		
P. V. Rajamannar		Madras	25 July 1945	20 April 1948	9 May 1961	13 years, 20 days	15 years, 289 days	
K. Subba Rao		Andhra Pradesh	22 March 1948	5 July 1954	30 January 1958^{[‡]}	3 years, 213 days	9 years, 315 days	
P. Chandra Reddy		Andhra Pradesh, transferred to Madras	16 July 1949	16 June 1958	30 June 1966	8 years, 15 days	16 years, 350 days	
S. Ramachandra Iyer		Madras	29 January 1958	16 September 1961	1 November 1964^{[RES]}	3 years, 47 days	6 years, 278 days	
M. Anantanarayanan		Madras	10 August 1959	1 July 1966	30 April 1969	2 years, 304 days	9 years, 264 days	
K. Veeraswami		Madras	20 February 1960	1 May 1969	7 April 1976	6 years, 343 days	16 years, 48 days	
P. S. Kailsam		Madras	20 October 1960	8 April 1976	2 January 1977^{[‡]}	270 days	16 years, 75 days	
T. Ramaprasada Rao		Madras	7 December 1966	29 May 1978	5 November 1979	1 year, 161 days	12 years, 334 days	
P. R. Gokulakrishnan		Gujarat	11 July 1969	21 March 1985	12 August 1990	5 years, 145 days	21 years, 33 days	
V. Ramaswami		Punjab & Haryana	31 January 1971	12 November 1987	6 October 1989^{[‡]}	1 year, 329 days	18 years, 249 days	
S. Mohan		Madras, transferred to Karnataka	27 February 1974	19 October 1989	6 October 1991^{[‡]}	1 year, 353 days	17 years, 222 days	
S. N. Sundaram		Gujarat, transferred to Andhra Pradesh	4 January 1978	15 June 1992	3 August 1994	2 years, 50 days	16 years, 212 days	
Viswanathan Ratnam		Himachal Pradesh	25 January 1979	29 January 1994	31 July 1994	184 days	15 years, 188 days	
K. Venkataswamy		Patna	24 July 1983	19 June 1994	5 March 1995^{[‡]}	260 days	11 years, 225 days	
Madhavachari Srinivasan		Himachal Pradesh	2 June 1986	12 August 1996	24 September 1997^{[‡]}	1 year, 44 days	11 years, 115 days	
K. A. Thanikkachallam		Sikkim	14 August 1988	27 August 1997	26 September 1997	31 days	9 years, 44 days	
Doraiswamy Raju		Himachal Pradesh	14 January 1990	1 July 1998	28 January 2000^{[‡]}	1 year, 212 days	10 years, 15 days	
A. R. Lakshmanan		Rajasthan, transferred to Andhra Pradesh	14 June 1990	29 May 2000	19 December 2002^{[‡]}	2 years, 205 days	12 years, 189 days	
Kumar Rajarathnam		Madhya Pradesh	1 January 1994	6 September 2003	12 March 2004	189 days	10 years, 72 days	
A. S. Venkatachala Moorthy		Chhattisgarh	17 October 1994	28 May 2004	7 January 2005	225 days	10 years, 83 days	
N. Dhinakar		Jharkhand	17 October 1994	4 December 2005	9 June 2006	188 days	11 years, 236 days	
M. Karpaga Vinayagam		Jharkhand	8 January 1996	17 September 2006	15 May 2008	1 year, 242 days	12 years, 129 days	
P. D. Dinakaran		Karnataka, transferred to Sikkim	19 December 1996	8 August 2008	29 July 2011^{[RES]}	2 years, 356 days	14 years, 223 days	
F. M. Ibrahim Kalifulla		Jammu & Kashmir	2 March 2000	18 September 2011	1 April 2012^{[‡]}	197 days	12 years, 31 days	
D. Murugesan		Delhi	2 March 2000	26 September 2012	10 June 2013	258 days	13 years, 101 days	
C. Nagappan		Orissa	27 September 2000	27 February 2013	18 September 2013^{[‡]}	204 days	12 years, 357 days	
R. Banumathi		Jharkhand	3 April 2003	16 November 2013	12 August 2014^{[‡]}	270 days	11 years, 132 days	
N. Paul Vasanthakumar		Jammu & Kashmir	10 December 2005	2 February 2015	14 March 2017	2 years, 41 days	11 years, 95 days	
R. Sudhakar		Manipur	10 December 2005	18 May 2018	13 February 2021	2 years, 272 days	15 years, 66 days	
V. Ramasubramanian		Himachal Pradesh	31 July 2006	22 June 2019	22 September 2019^{[‡]}	93 days	13 years, 54 days	
S. Manikumar		Kerala	31 July 2006	11 October 2019	24 April 2023	3 years, 196 days	16 years, 268 days	
T. S. Sivagnanam		Calcutta	31 March 2009	11 May 2023	15 September 2025	2 years, 128 days	16 years, 169 days	
S. Vaidyanathan		Meghalaya	25 October 2013	11 February 2024	16 August 2024	188 days	10 years, 297 days	
D. Krishnakumar		Manipur	7 April 2016	22 November 2024	21 May 2025	181 days	9 years, 45 days	
M. Sundar		Manipur	5 October 2016	15 September 2025	Incumbent	1 year, 64 days	13 years, 194 days	

=== Judges appointed as Acting Chief Justice ===
Name	High Court	Date of appointment to the High Court	Period as acting Chief Justice	Date of retirement	Tenure as acting Chief Justice	Tenure as Judge	Remarks	Ref
P. Chandra Reddy	Andhra Pradesh	16 July 1949	31 Jan 1958 – 15 Jun 1958	30 June 1966	136 days	16 years, 350 days	Made permanent	
S. Ramachandra Iyer	Madras	29 January 1958	10 May 1961 – 15 Sep 1961	1 November 1964^{[RES]}	129 days	6 years, 278 days	Made permanent	
P. R. Gokulakrishnan	Madras	11 July 1969	10 Jul 1981 – 11 Mar 1982	12 August 1990	245 days	21 years, 33 days	--	
P. R. Gokulakrishnan	Madras	11 July 1969	25 Jan 1984 – 2 Apr 1984	12 August 1990	54 days	21 years, 33 days	--	
S. R. Pandian	Madras	27 February 1974	14 Mar 1988 – 13 Dec 1988	13 December 1988^{[‡]}	275 days	14 years, 291 days	Elevated to the Supreme Court	
S. Mohan	Madras	27 February 1974	14 Dec 1988 – 18 Oct 1989	6 October 1991^{[‡]}	309 days	17 years, 222 days	Made permanent	
S. N. Sundaram	Madras	4 January 1978	18 Nov 1991 – 14 Jun 1992	3 August 1994	210 days	16 years, 212 days	Elevated as Chief Justice of Gujarat High Court	
V. Ratnam	Madras	25 January 1979	15 Nov 1992 – 30 Jun 1993	31 July 1994	228 days	15 years, 188 days	--	
K. A. Thanikkachallam	Madras	14 August 1988	20 Mar 1997 – 6 Jul 1997	26 September 1997	109 days	9 years, 44 days	--	
A. R. Lakshmanan	Kerala	14 June 1990	23 May 1999 – 19 Sep 1999	19 December 2002^{[‡]}	120 days	12 years, 189 days	--	
A. R. Lakshmanan	Kerala	14 June 1990	8 May 2000 – 27 May 2000	19 December 2002^{[‡]}	20 days	12 years, 189 days	Elevated as Chief Justice of Rajasthan High Court	
N. Dhinakar	Madras	17 October 1994	21 Nov 2004 – 27 Nov 2004	9 June 2006	7 days	11 years, 236 days	--	
N. Dhinakar	Madras	17 October 1994	11 Oct 2005 – 11 Nov 2005	9 June 2006	32 days	11 years, 236 days	--	
F. M. Ibrahim Kalifulla	Jammu & Kashmir	2 March 2000	7 Apr 2011 – 17 Sep 2011	1 April 2012^{[‡]}	197 days	12 years, 31 days	Made permanent	
R. Sudhakar	Jammu & Kashmir	10 December 2005	15 Mar 2017 – 31 Mar 2017	13 February 2021	17 days	15 years, 66 days		
R. Sudhakar	Jammu & Kashmir	10 December 2005	16 Mar 2018 – 11 May 2018	13 February 2021	57 days	15 years, 66 days	Elevated as Chief Justice of Manipur High Court	
T. S. Sivagnanam	Calcutta	31 March 2009	31 Mar 2023 – 10 May 2023	15 September 2025	41 days	16 years, 169 days	Made permanent	
M. Duraiswamy	Madras	31 March 2009	17 Nov 2021 – 21 Nov 2021	21 September 2022	5 days	13 years, 175 days	--	
M. Duraiswamy	Madras	31 March 2009	13 Sep 2022 – 21 Sep 2022	21 September 2022	9 days	13 years, 175 days	Retired as acting Chief Justice	
T. Raja	Madras	31 March 2009	22 Sep 2022 – 24 May 2023	24 May 2023	245 days	14 years, 55 days	Retired as acting Chief Justice	
S. Vaidyanathan	Madras	25 October 2013	25 May 2023 – 27 May 2023	16 August 2024	3 days	10 years, 297 days	--	
R. Mahadevan	Madras	25 October 2013	24 May 2024 – 17 Jul 2024	17 July 2024^{[‡]}	55 days	10 years, 267 days	Elevated to the Supreme Court	
D. Krishnakumar	Madras	7 April 2016	18 Jul 2024 – 26 Sep 2024	21 May 2025	72 days	9 years, 45 days	--	
M. V. Muralidaran	Manipur	7 April 2016	6 Feb 2023 – 19 Oct 2023	15 April 2024	256 days	8 years, 9 days	--	

== Judges elevated to Supreme Court ==
This section includes the list of only those judges whose parent high court was Madras. This includes those judges who, at the time of elevation to Supreme Court of India, may not be serving in Madras High Court but this list does not include judges who at the time of elevation were serving in Madras High Court but does not have Madras as their Parent High Court.

Colour Key

- Female Judge
- Served as Chief Justice of India

Key

- ^{RES} Resigned
- ^{†} Died in office

#	Name of the Judge	Image	Date of Appointment		Date of Retirement	Tenure			Immediately preceding office
#	Name of the Judge	Image	In Parent High Court	In Supreme Court	Date of Retirement	In High Court(s)	In Supreme Court	Total tenure (Note: Includes tenure as High Court and Supreme Court Judge)	Immediately preceding office
1	Mandakolathur Patanjali Sastri		15 March 1939	6 December 1947 (Note: Elevated to the Federal Court of India on 6 December 1947, and became part of the Supreme Court of India after its establishment on 26 January 1950.)	3 January 1954	8 years, 266 days	6 years, 29 days	14 years, 295 days	Judge of Madras HC
2	Nagapudi Chandrasekhara Aiyar		16 July 1941	23 September 1950 (Note: Retired as High Court judge on 25 January 1948 before being elevated to Supreme Court of India)	24 January 1953	6 years, 194 days	2 years, 124 days	8 years, 318 days	--
3	Tirunelveli Lakshmanasuri Venkatarama Iyer		7 January 1951	4 January 1954 (Note: Retired as High Court judge on 24 November 1953 before being elevated to Supreme Court of India)	24 November 1958	2 years, 322 days	4 years, 325 days	7 years, 282 days	--
4	Parakulangara Govinda Menon		28 July 1947	1 September 1956	16 October 1957^{[†]}	9 years, 35 days	1 year, 46 days	10 years, 81 days	Judge of Madras HC
5	Koka Subba Rao		22 March 1948	31 January 1958	11 April 1967^{[RES]}	9 years, 315 days	9 years, 71 days	19 years, 21 days	1st CJ of undivided Andhra Pradesh HC
6	Narsimha Rajagopala Ayyangar		16 November 1953	27 July 1960 (Note: Retired as High Court judge on 14 December 1959 before being elevate to Supreme Court of India)	14 December 1964	6 years, 29 days	4 years, 141 days	10 years, 185 days	--
7	Alwar Naicker Alagiriswami		11 August 1966	17 October 1972	16 October 1975	6 years, 67 days	3 years, 0 days	9 years, 67 days	Judge of Madras HC
8	Palapatti Sadaya Goundar Kailasam		20 October 1960	3 January 1977	11 September 1980	16 years, 75 days	3 years, 253 days	19 years, 328 days	17th CJ of Madras HC
9	Appajee Varadarajan		15 February 1973	10 December 1980	16 August 1985	7 years, 299 days	4 years, 250 days	12 years, 183 days	Judge of Madras HC
10	Sivasankar Natarajan		15 February 1973	10 March 1986	28 October 1989	13 years, 23 days	3 years, 233 days	16 years, 256 days	Judge of Madras HC
11	S. Ratnavel Pandian		27 February 1974	14 December 1988	12 March 1994	14 years, 291 days	5 years, 89 days	20 years, 14 days	Acting CJ of Madras HC
12	Veeraswami Ramaswami		31 January 1971	6 October 1989	14 February 1994	18 years, 248 days	4 years, 132 days	23 years, 15 days	16th CJ of Punjab & Haryana HC
13	Shanmughasundaram Mohan		27 February 1974	7 October 1991	10 February 1995	17 years, 222 days	3 years, 127 days	20 years, 349 days	12th CJ of Karnataka HC
14	Konduswami Venkataswamy		24 July 1983	6 March 1995	18 September 1999	11 years, 225 days	4 years, 197 days	16 years, 57 days	26th CJ of Patna HC
15	Madhavachari Srinivasan		2 June 1986	25 September 1997	25 February 2000^{[†]}	11 years, 115 days	2 years, 154 days	13 years, 269 days	13th CJ of Himachal Pradesh HC
16	Doraiswamy Raju		14 January 1990	28 January 2000	1 July 2004	10 years, 14 days	4 years, 156 days	14 years, 170 days	15th CJ of Himachal Pradesh HC
17	Arunachalam R. Lakshmanan		14 June 1990	20 December 2002	21 March 2007	12 years, 189 days	4 years, 92 days	16 years, 281 days	22nd CJ of Rajasthan HC
18	Palanisamy Sathasivam		8 August 1996	21 August 2007	26 April 2014	11 years, 13 days	6 years, 249 days	17 years, 262 days	Judge of Punjab & Haryana HC
19	Fakkir Mohamed Ibrahim Kalifulla		2 March 2000	2 April 2012	22 July 2016	12 years, 31 days	4 years, 112 days	16 years, 143 days	29th CJ of Jammu & Kashmir HC
20	Chokkalingam Nagappan		27 September 2000	19 September 2013	3 October 2016	12 years, 357 days	3 years, 15 days	16 years, 7 days	25th CJ of Orissa HC
21	R. Banumathi		3 April 2003	13 August 2014	19 July 2020	11 years, 132 days	5 years, 342 days	17 years, 108 days	9th CJ of Jharkhand HC
22	V. Ramasubramanian		31 July 2006	23 September 2019	29 June 2023	13 years, 54 days	3 years, 280 days	16 years, 334 days	34th CJ of Himachal Pradesh HC
23	M. M. Sundresh		31 March 2009	31 August 2021	Incumbent	12 years, 153 days	5 years, 79 days	17 years, 232 days	Judge of Madras HC
24	R. Mahadevan		25 October 2013	18 July 2024	Incumbent	10 years, 267 days	2 years, 124 days	13 years, 24 days	Acting CJ of Madras HC

== See also ==
- High Courts of India
- Architecture of Chennai
- Heritage structures in Chennai
