= M. Anantanarayanan =

Indian lawyer and civil servant (1907–1981)

Madhavaiah Anantanarayanan (1907–1981), (son of A. Madhaviah, one of the earliest Indian novelists to write in English), was an Indian lawyer and civil servant who served as the Chief Justice of Madras State (later Tamil Nadu) from 1966 to 1969.

== Early life ==
Anantanarayanan was born in Madras on 1 May 1907 to a Vadama Iyer Brahmin family, and had his schooling at Sir M. Ct. Muthiah High School and the Hindu High School. He received a B.A. from Madras University, and an M.A. from Gonville and Caius College, University of Cambridge.

== Career ==
Anantanarayanan joined the Indian civil service on 15 October 1929 and served as Sub-Collector and Joint Magistrate in various districts of the Madras Presidency. He became a District Judge on 8 March 1940 and was appointed to the Madras High Court in August 1956. Anantanarayanan served as Chief Justice of Tamil Nadu from July 1966 until his retirement on 30 April 1969. Anantanarayanan also served as Director of Legal Studies, Madras from 1955 to 1959.

== Selected works ==
The Silver Pilgrimage is Anantanarayanan's only published novel; it was influenced by Dandin's Dasakumaracharitha or The Adventures of Ten Princes. John Updike wrote a short poem about Anantanarayanan upon the book's publication, "I Missed His Book, but I Read His Name".

- Anantanarayanan, M. (1961). The Silver Pilgrimage. Criterion Books.

== Death ==
Anantanarayanan died on 18 November 1981 at his son's residence in Bombay.
