= V. Mohan =

Indian physician

Dr. V. Mohan
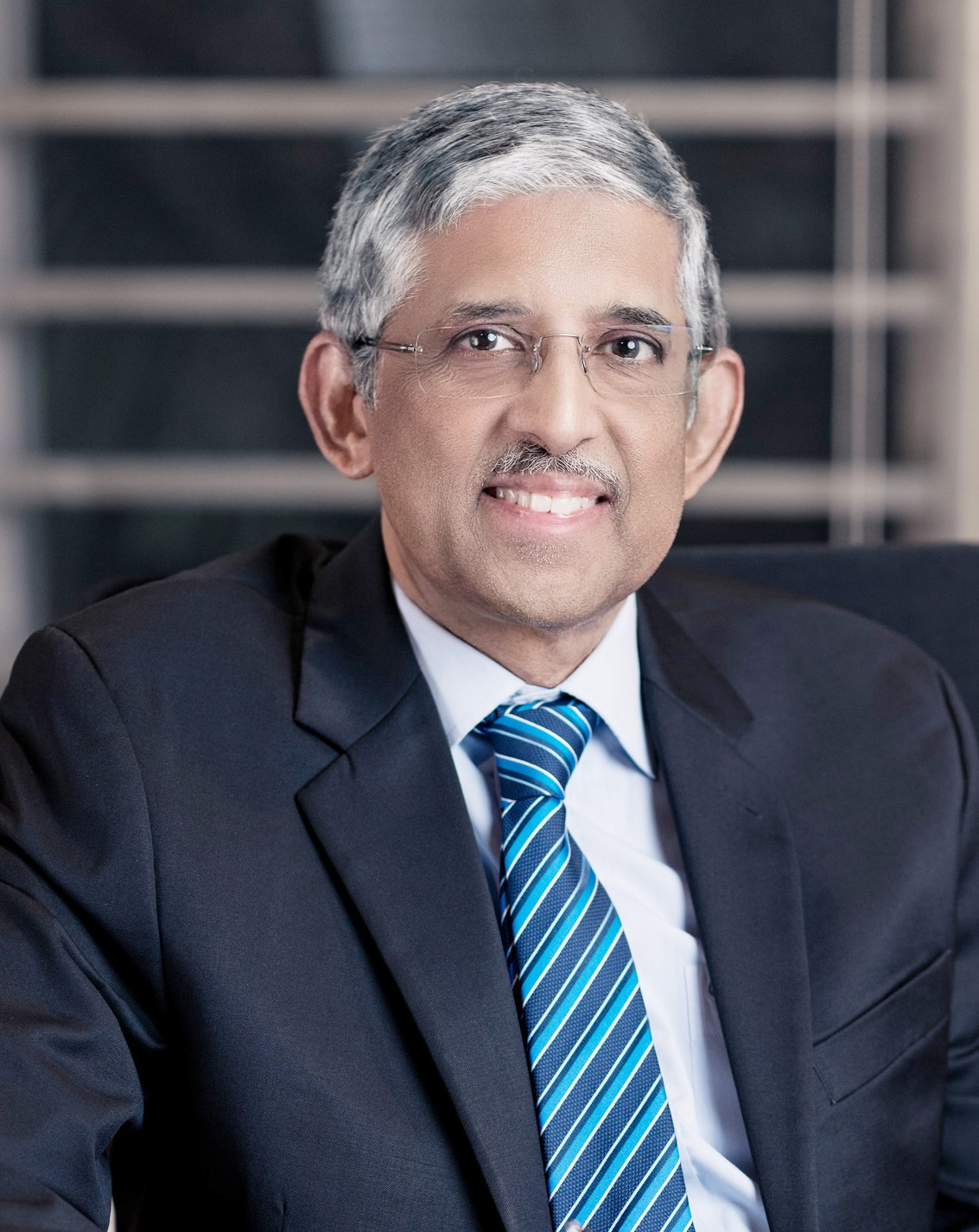
- Born: April 10, 1954 (age 72); Kerala
- Citizenship: Indian
- Education: Madras Medical College, Chennai
- Occupations: Diabetologist, Chennai
- Notable work: Type 2 Diabetes Mellitus
- Awards: Padma Shri (2012); Dr. B. C. Roy Award

V. Mohan is an Indian physician specializing in diabetology. He is the Chairman of Dr. Mohan's Diabetes Specialities Centre, which is an IDF Centre of Excellence in Diabetes Care. He is also the Chairman of the Madras Diabetes Research Foundation in Chennai which is an ICMR - Collaborating Centre of Excellence (ICMR-CCoE).

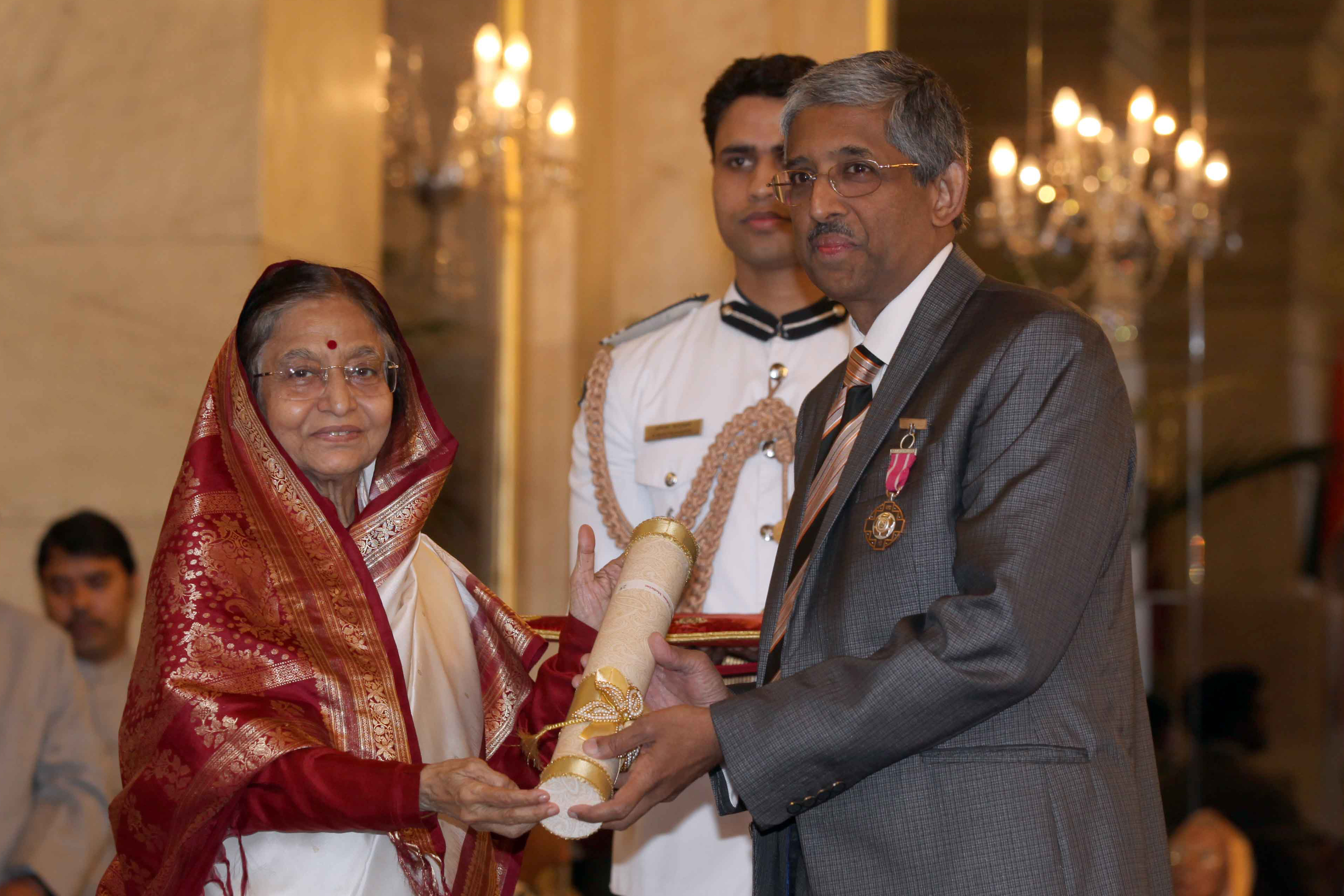
Dr V Mohan receiving Padma Shri Award from President of India (2012)

Dr. V. Mohan has been in clinical practice for over 53 years and has treated tens of thousands of patients with diabetes. He has published over 1,220 research articles with more than 2,53,149 citations and an h-index of 175. He also serves on various national and international bodies and societies. He is ranked amongst the top 2% of scientists in the world and the top medical scientist in India as per Stanford University Global.

== Education ==
Dr. Mohan completed his undergraduate (MBBS) and postgraduate medical education (MD, General Medicine) from Madras Medical College Chennai, India. In 1984 – 85, he worked for a year as a Welcome Trust Research Fellow at the Royal Postgraduate Medical School and Hammersmith Hospital, London, U.K and in 1985 – 86 as an Alexander Von Humboldt Fellow at the University of Ulm, Germany.

He was awarded a PhD in 1987 and later a Doctor of Science (D.Sc.) by thesis in 1997 for his research in the field of Fibrocalculous Pancreatic Diabetes (FCPD).

== Clinical services ==
Mohan started his research work on diabetes at the age of 18 as an undergraduate medical student when he joined his father, the pioneer in diabetology in India, Prof M. Viswanathan. In 1971, together with his father, he set up the first private diabetes centre in India, the M.V. Hospital for Diabetes and continued to work at this centre till 1991. Mohan and his late wife Rema Mohan who was an internationally recognized ophthalmologist in the field of diabetes eye diseases, subsequently established their own diabetes centre under the name of "Dr. Mohan's Diabetes Specialities Centre".

He and his daughter R.M. Anjana and son in law Ranjit Unnikrishnan and their colleagues now oversee a chain of 50 diabetes centres across 8 states and 32 cities of India.

== Research ==
In 1996, Mohan and his late wife Rema established the Madras Diabetes Research Foundation (MDRF) at Chennai with over 20 scientists. Over 75 students at MDRF have obtained their PhD degree working at MDRF, from 4 Universities, namely the Madras University, The Tamil Nadu Dr MGR Medical University, the Deakin University, Melbourne, Australia and the University of Warwick, UK. Dr. Mohan's research combines clinical, epidemiological, and genomic aspects of diabetes.

As of October 2025, he has published 1180 original research papers. His research work has an h-index of 170, an i-10 index of 1165 and has received over 246,000 citations. His areas of work include Epidemiology of diabetes and its complications, Genomics of diabetes, Precision Diabetes, Nutrition and Diabetes and Fibrocalculous Pancreatic Diabetes (FCPD). Dr. Mohan described the criteria for diagnosis of FCPD which is known as Mohan's criteria for FCPD. He has also done seminal work on describing the Asian Indian (South Asian) Phenotype of type 2 diabetes. He was the national co-ordinator for the ICMR – INDIAB national epidemiological study of diabetes and other NCDs, carried out on 124,000 individuals representative of India's 1.4 billion people and covering all states and union territories of India. He has also been involved in the other large epidemiological studies like PURE (n = 225,000 individuals in 27 high, middle and low-income countries) and CARRS (n = 20,000). His work on Monogenic Diabetes is well recognised. He and his colleagues have set up a National Registry for Monogenic Diabetes in India.

== Training and education programs in diabetes ==
Mohan has started several training courses for diabetes for health care professionals. This includes a two-year full time Fellowship in Diabetology for medical doctors with an undergraduate medical degree. In collaboration with the Public Health Foundation of India (PHFI), the Dr. Mohan's Diabetes Education Academy (DMDEA) set up by him, has started a Certificate Course in Evidence-Based Management of Diabetes as well as a Certificate Course in Gestational Diabetes Mellitus (CCGDM) and a Certificate Course in Diabetic Retinopathy (CCDR).

== Rural Diabetes Services and Charity ==
Mohan established a rural diabetology service with a fully equipped mobile diabetes van and satellite connection with the initial support of the World Diabetes Foundation (WDF), Denmark, and the Indian Space Research Organization (ISRO) and the National Agro Foundation (NAF). Mohan is a follower of Bhagawan Sri Sathya Sai Baba and is a Trustee of the Sri Sathya Sai Central Trust at Puttaparthi in Andhra Pradesh.

== Awards ==
Mohan has received several awards, including the Padma Shri National Award by the Government of India for his accomplishments in the field of diabetology. In 2018, he received the Dr. Harold Rifkin Distinguished International Service in the Cause of Diabetes Award in 2024, the Dr. Kelly West Award for Outstanding Achievement in Epidemiology from the American Diabetes Association. He is also a recipient of the Dr. B. C. Roy Award of the Medical Council of India, the FRSE from the Royal Society of Edinburgh. He is also an Honorary Fellow of the International Diabetes Federation (IDF). Recently, he was awarded the Inaugural European Association for the Study of Diabetes (EASD) Diabetes Global Impact Prize

== Books published ==
- Mohan, V. (2017). Sathya Sai Baba lives on. Sri Sathya Sai Sadhana.
- 'Making Excellence a Habit: The Secret to Building a World-Class Healthcare System in India', published by Penguin India in February 2021.
- Banting, Bose and Beyond Published by Notion Press in May 2022.
