= Richard Littlehailes =

British educationist (1878–1950)

Richard Littlehailes CIE (1878–1950) was a British educationist and administrator who spent most of his career in India. He was Vice chancellor of the University of Madras from 1934 to 1937.

== Biography ==
Littlehailes did his initial schooling from Bede School, Sunderland and gained an exhibition at from Balliol College, Oxford

Littlehailes entered the Indian Education Service in 1903 and later became the Director of Public Instruction in Madras in 1919. From 1927 to 1933 Littlehailes served as the Educational Commissioner to the Government of India and later became the educational advisor of the Baroda State under Sir Sayajirao Gaekwad III, Maharaja of Baroda from 1933 to 1934.

In his later career he served as the Vice Chancellor of University of Madras from 1934 until his retirement in 1937. He died at his home in Fleet, Hampshire on 16 December 1950.

== Legacy ==
He was responsible for sending Srinivasa Ramanujan to UK for higher studies under G. H. Hardy as his capacity as the professor of Mathematics of Presidency College, Madras where Ramanujan was student at that time.

During a function held on the eve of departure of Sarvepalli Radhakrishnan to Oxford University in 1936 he quoted—

Radhakrishnan had raised himself step by step. When would he reach the summit of the Mount Everest of his career? Would he aspire to higher things in the life and emulate such a man as Woodrow Wilson, who has at one time a professor; and ended up as President of the United States of America?

His prophecy came true when Radhakrishnan became the second President of India in 1962.
