= Madras Diabetes Research Foundation =

Nonprofit organization in Chennai, India

Coordinates: 13.054090°N 80.257747°E

- Formation: 1996
- Type: Research institute
- Headquarters: Chennai, India
- Location: No. 4, Conran Smith Road, Gopalapuram, Chennai - 600 086
- Founder: Dr. V. Mohan
- Website: mdrf.in

The Madras Diabetes Research Foundation (MDRF) is a medical research organization located in Gopalapuram, Chennai established in 1996 by the diabetologist, Dr. V. Mohan.

== Research activities ==
MDRF conducts basic, clinical and epidemiological research in diabetes and allied fields. The organisation collaborates with several national and international centres and publishes research articles and case studies in peer-reviewed journals. It is recognized as the ‘Centre for Advanced Research in Genomics of Diabetes’ by the Indian Council of Medical Research (ICMR).

== Academic activities ==
The MDRF is recognized by the Tamil Nadu Dr. MGR Medical University and the University of Madras for conducting courses leading to the award of PhD degree. The organization has also been offering a 'Postgraduate Course in Diabetology' in association with American Diabetes Association (ADA) to train medical professionals in diabetes care and management.
