= University of Madras =

Public university in Chennai, India

- சென்னைப் பல்கலைக்கழகம்
- Coat of Arms
- Other name: Cheṉṉai palkalaikalhagam
- Motto: Doctrina Vim Promovet Insitam (Latin) "கற்றனைத்தூறும் அறிவும் ஆற்றலும்" (Tamil)
- Motto in English: "Learning Promotes Natural Talent"
- Type: State university
- Established: 5 September 1857; 169 years ago
- Accreditation: NAAC
- Affiliations: UGC, AIU, ACU
- Chancellor: Governor of Tamil Nadu
- Vice-Chancellor: Vacant
- Academic staff: 345
- Students: 4,819
- Postgraduates: 3,239
- Doctoral students: 1,099
- Location: Chennai (Madras), Tamil Nadu, India; 13°3′58″N 80°16′58″E
- Campus: Urban
- Colours: Cardinal
- Nickname: Madras Tigers
- Mascot: Tiger
- Website: unom.ac.in

The University of Madras is a public state university in Chennai (Madras), Tamil Nadu, India. Established in 1857, it is one of the oldest and most prominent universities in India, incorporated by an act of the Legislative Council of India under the British government. The university is the alma mater of five Presidents of India, including A. P. J. Abdul Kalam; three Chief Justices of the Supreme Court of India; two Indian physics Nobel laureates, CV Raman and Subrahmanyan Chandrasekhar; several notable mathematicians including Srinivasa Ramanujan and Abel Prize winner S. R. Srinivasa Varadhan; and Turing Award winner Raj Reddy among others.

The University of Madras is a collegiate research university and has six campuses in the city: Chepauk, Marina, Guindy, Taramani, Maduravoyal and Chetpet. It offers more than 230 courses under 87 academic departments of post-graduate teaching and research grouped under 18 schools, covering diverse areas such as sciences, social sciences, humanities, management and medicine along with 121 affiliated colleges and 53 approved research institutions. The university houses national centres for advanced research in nanotechnology, photonics and neurotoxicity. In addition, it has three Centres of Advanced Study in biophysics, botany and the Ramanujan Institute for Advanced Study in Mathematics.

The National Assessment and Accreditation Council has conferred 'five star' accreditation to the university in the first cycle, and subsequently with its highest A++ grade. The University of Madras has been given the status of "University with Potential for Excellence (UPE)" by the University Grants Commission. Madras University is also recognized among the 18 universities in India having the 'Centre with Potential for Excellence in Particular Area (CPEPA)' with a focus on drug development and climate change.

== History ==
Vice Chancellors
- Sir Christopher Rawlinson 1857
- Walter Elliot 1859
- William Ambrose Morehead 1860
- Colley Harman Scotland 1862
- Alexander J. Arbuthnot 1871
- William Holloway 1872
- Lewis Charles Innes 1874
- Charles Arthur Turner 1880, 1882
- James K. Kernan 1885–1889
- Arthur Hammond Collins 1889–1899
- David Duncan 1899
- H. H. Shepard 1899
- The Rev. William Miller 1901
- Charles Arnold White 1904
- S. Subramania Iyer 1904
- Charles Arnold White 1904–1908
- J. E. P. Wallis 1908–1916
- P. S. Sivaswami Iyer 1916–1918
- F. D. Oldfield 1918–1920
- K. R. Srinivasa Iyengar 1920–1923
- E. Monteith Macphail 1923–1925
- Raghupathi Venkataratnam Naidu 1925–1928
- K. Ramunni Menon 1928–1934
- Richard Littlehailes 1934–1937
- S. E. Ranganadhan 1937–1940
- Mohammad Usman 1940–1942
- A. Lakshmanaswami Mudaliar 1942–1969
- N. D. Sundaravadivelu 1969–1975
- Malcolm S. Adiseshiah 1975–1978
- G. R. Damodaran 1978–1981
- Mushi Santappa 1981–1984
- B. B. Sundaresen 1984–1987
- Arumugam Gnanam 1988–1990
- S. Sathikh 1990–1994
- P. K. Ponnusamy 1994–1997
- P. T. Manoharan 1997–1999
- Pon. Kothandaraman 1999–2002
- S. Ignacimuthu 2002–2003
- S. P. Thyagarajan 2003–2006
- S. Ramachandran 2006–2009
- G. Thiruvasagam 2009–2012
- R. Thandavan 2013–2016
- P. Duraisamy 2017–2020
- S. Gowri–2021-2023

The Madras University Senate House and Marina Beach, 1905

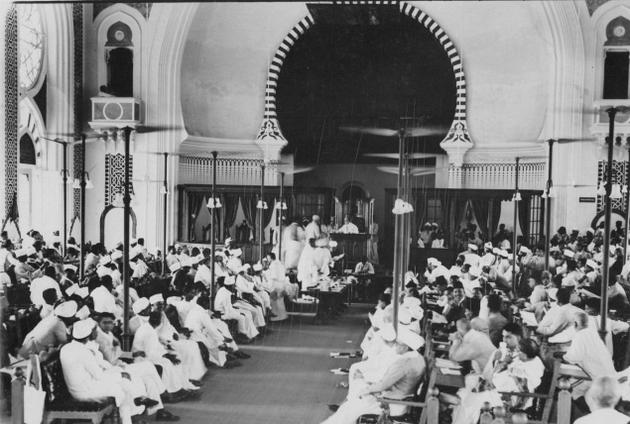
Legislative Assembly session of Madras Presidency in Senate House, 1937

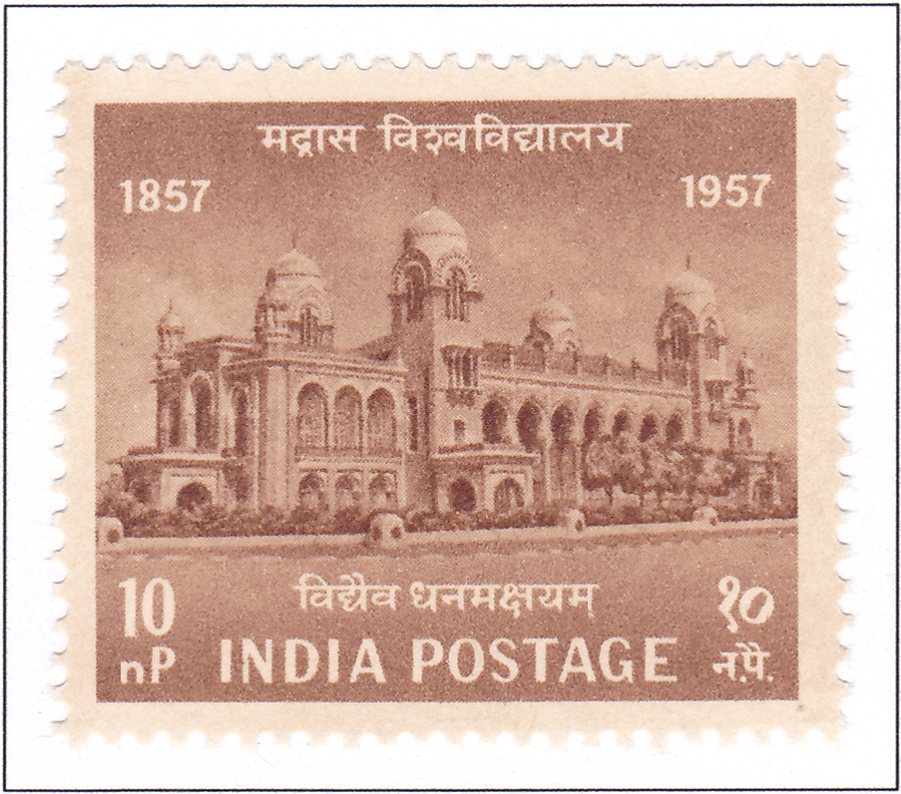
A 1957 postal stamp dedicated to the centenary of Madras University

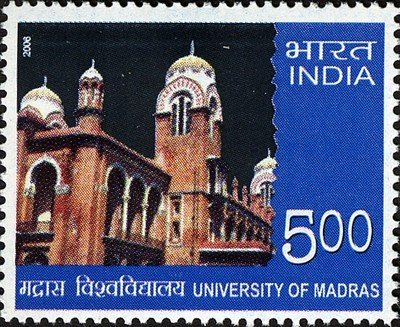
A 2006 postal stamp of Madras University

The first-ever demand for higher education in Madras Presidency was given in a public address to Lord John Elphinstone, governor of Madras, signed by 70,000 residents when the Governor-in-Council was contemplating "some effective and liberal measures for the establishment of an improved system of national education". This public petition, which was presented by the Advocate General Mr George Norton on 11 November 1839, pressed the need for an English college in the city of Madras. Pursuant to this, Lord Elphinstone evolved a plan for the establishment of a central collegiate institution or a "university". This university had twin departments – a high school for the cultivation of English literature, regional language, philosophy and science, and a college for instruction in the higher branches of literature, philosophy and science.

The University Board was constituted in January 1840 with Mr George Norton as its president. This was the precursor of the present Presidency College, Chennai. A systematic educational policy for India was formulated 14 years later by Wood's despatch, which pointed out the rationale for "creating a properly articulated system of education from the primary school to the University." The dispatch recommended the establishment in the universities of professorships "for the purposes of the delivery of lectures in various branches of learning including vernacular as well as classical languages". As a result, the University of Madras, organised on the model of the University of London, was incorporated on 5 September 1857 by an act of the Legislative Council of India.

The university progressed and expanded through the 19th century to span the whole of South India, giving birth to universities like Mysore University (1916), Osmania University (1918), Andhra University (1926), Annamalai University (1929), Travancore University (1937) presently University of Kerala, Sri Venkateswara University (1954), Madurai Kamaraj University (1966), Tamil Nadu Agricultural University (1971), Anna University (1978), Tamil University (1981), Bharathidasan University (1982), Bharathiar University (1982), Mother Teresa Women's University (1984), Alagappa University (1985), Dr. M.G.R. Medical University (1989), Veterinary and Animal Sciences University (1989), Manonmaniam Sundaranar University (1990), Periyar University (1997), Dr. Ambedkar Law University (1996) and Thiruvalluvar University (2002).

In 1912, endowments were made to the university to establish departments of Indian History, Archaeology, Comparative Philology and Indian Economics. In that year, the university had 17 departments, 30 teachers, and 69 research scholars. Later, the research and teaching functions of the university were encouraged by the Sadler Commission and the gains of the university were consolidated by the enactment of the Madras University Act of 1923. About this time, the territorial ambit of the Madras University encompassed Berhampur of Odisha in the North East, Trivandrum of Kerala in the South West, Bangalore and Mangalore of Karnataka in the West and Hyderabad of Andhra Pradesh in the North.

Between 1926 and 1939, the university published the comprehensive Tamil Lexicon dictionary, which is the first among the dictionaries published in any Indian language.

== Coat of arms ==
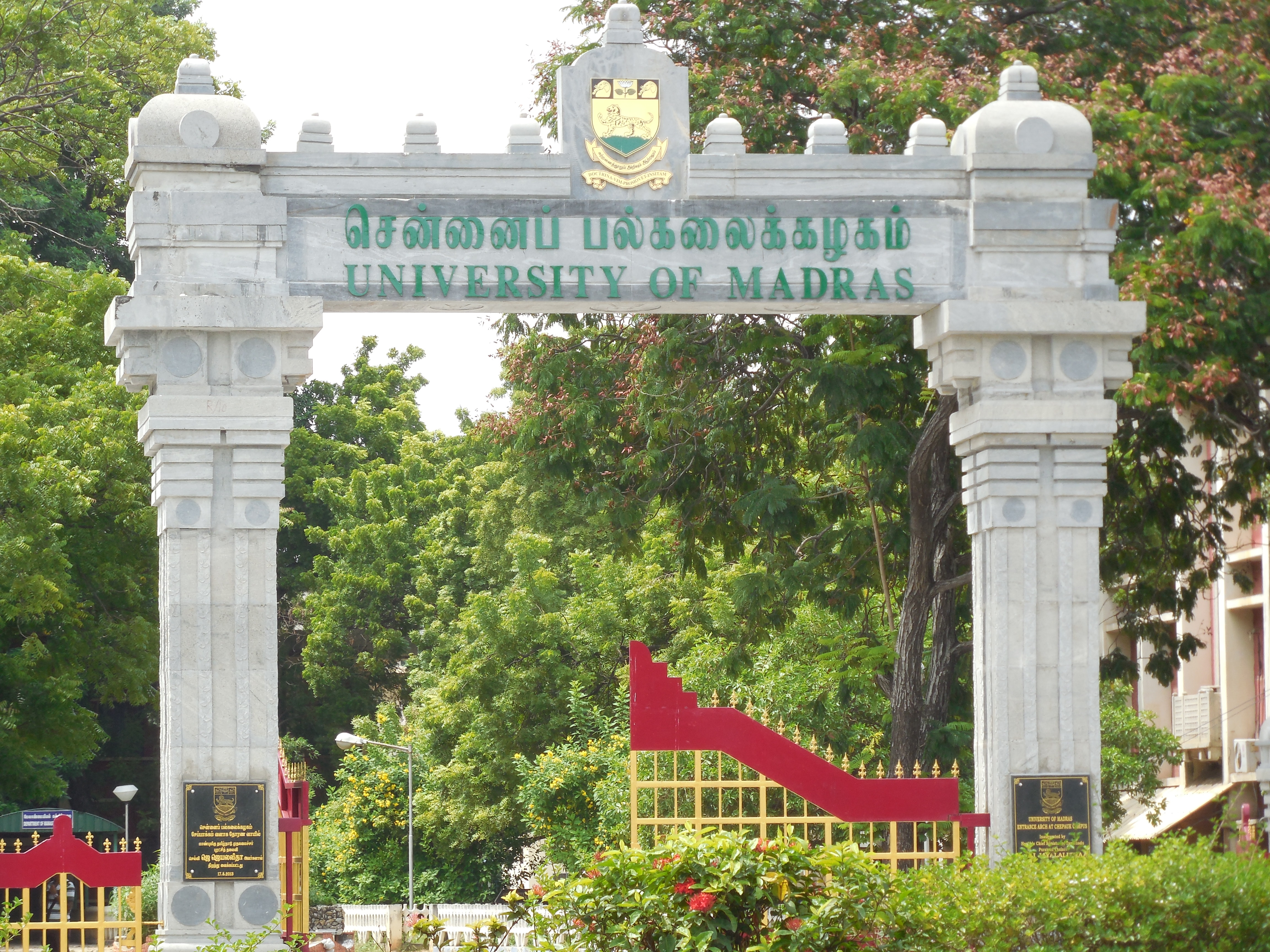
University of Madras Entrance Arch at Chepauk Campus

The description of the coat of arms of the university, designed in 1857, is:

"Argent (silver or white) on a Mount issuant from the basement a Tiger passant proper (walking and coloured naturally), on a Chief Sable (black across the top), a Pale Or (a gold or yellow vertical strip down the centre 1/3 of the top or chief), thereon, between two Elephant heads couped of the field, a lotus flower leaved and slipped of the third, together with this motto Doctrina Vim Promovet Insitam".

The coat of arms colours are: the base is light green, the tiger is yellow on a white background, the elephant is grey on a black background, the lotus is a white flower with olive green leaves, on a gold background. The motto scroll is edged in red, with black lettering. The English translation of the motto of the University of Madras is: "Learning promotes natural talent."

== Campus ==
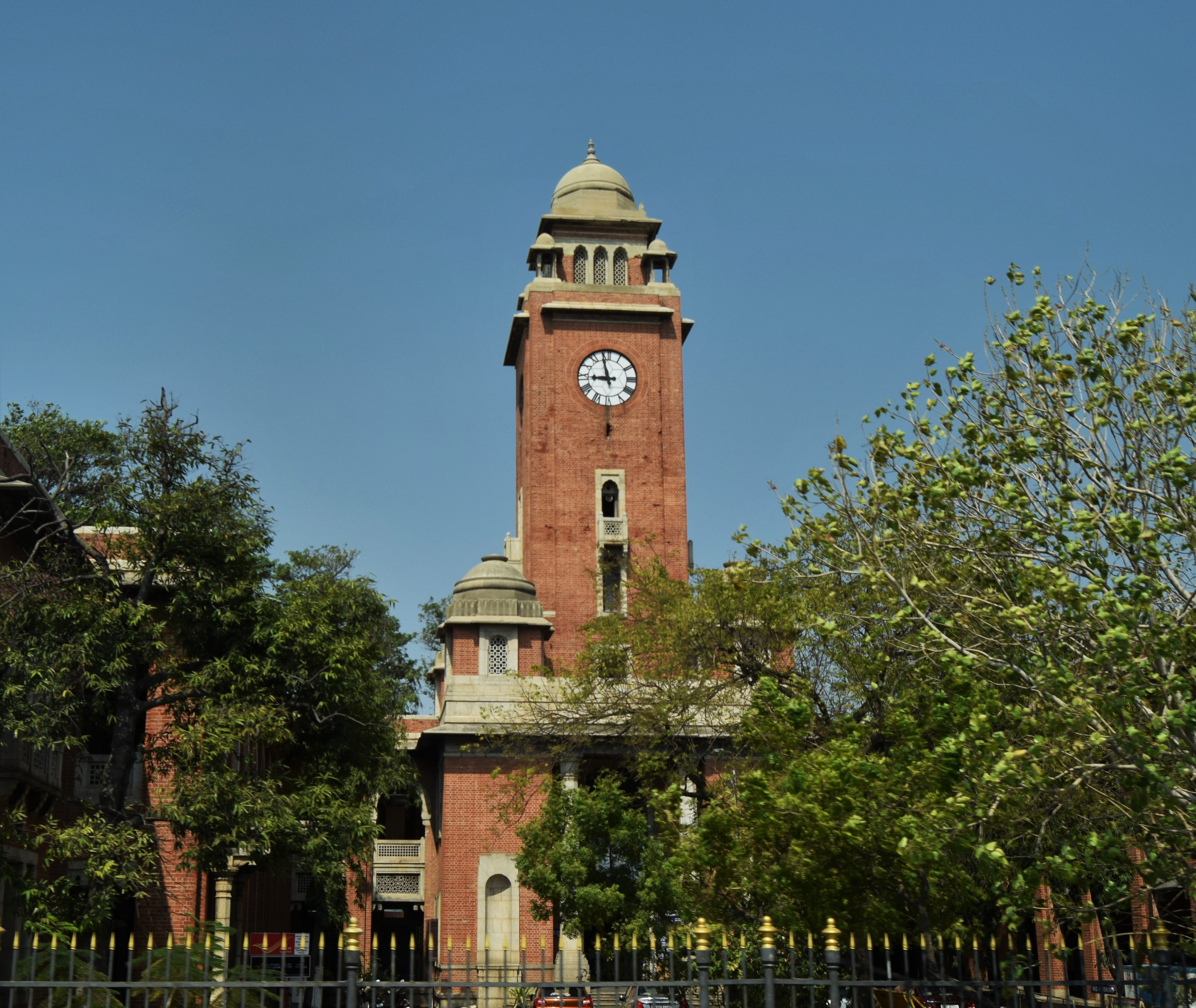
Clock Tower at the Chepauk Campus of the University of Madras

The university has six campuses: Chepauk, Marina, Guindy, Taramani, Chetpet and Maduravoyal. The Chepauk campus of the university houses the administrative buildings, the historic Senate House, the Government Oriental Manuscripts Library and Research Centre, clock tower, centenary auditorium, and several departments under arts, humanities and social science streams. The schools of oriental and Indian are located at the Marina campus. The Guindy campus incorporates the natural sciences departments, while the campus at Taramani houses the school of basic medical sciences. The sports union and the botanical garden are based on the Chetpet and Maduravoyal campuses, respectively. The Department of Mathematics of the university is operated as the Ramanujan Institute for Advanced Study in Mathematics located close to the Chepauk campus. The university has two constituent college, in Nemmeli and Thiruvottiyur, offering courses in arts and science. Since 1981, the university has also developed an Institute of Distance Education, offering various academic and professional programmes approved by University Grants Commission under the choice-based credit system (CBCS) pattern.

=== Senate House ===
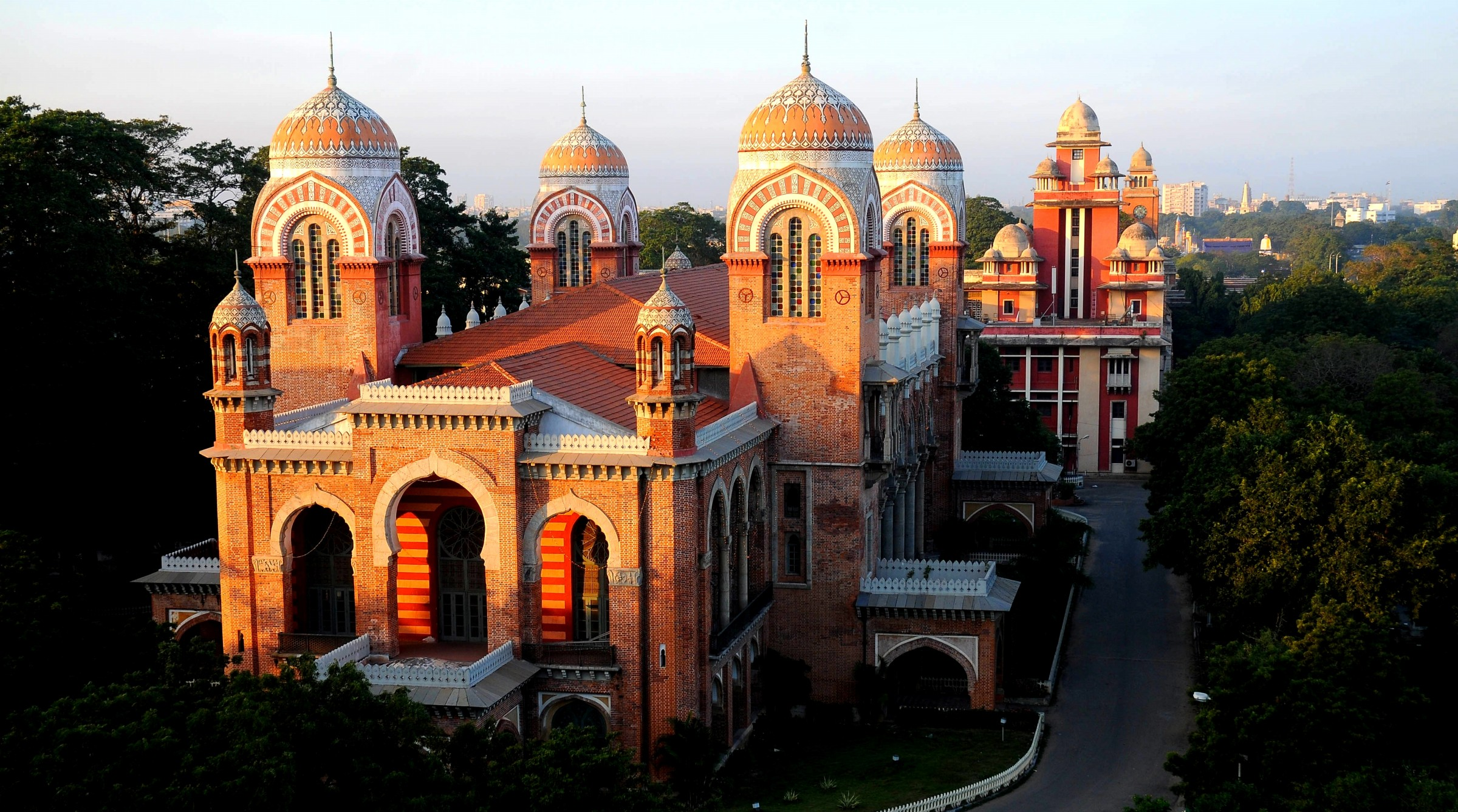
The Senate House

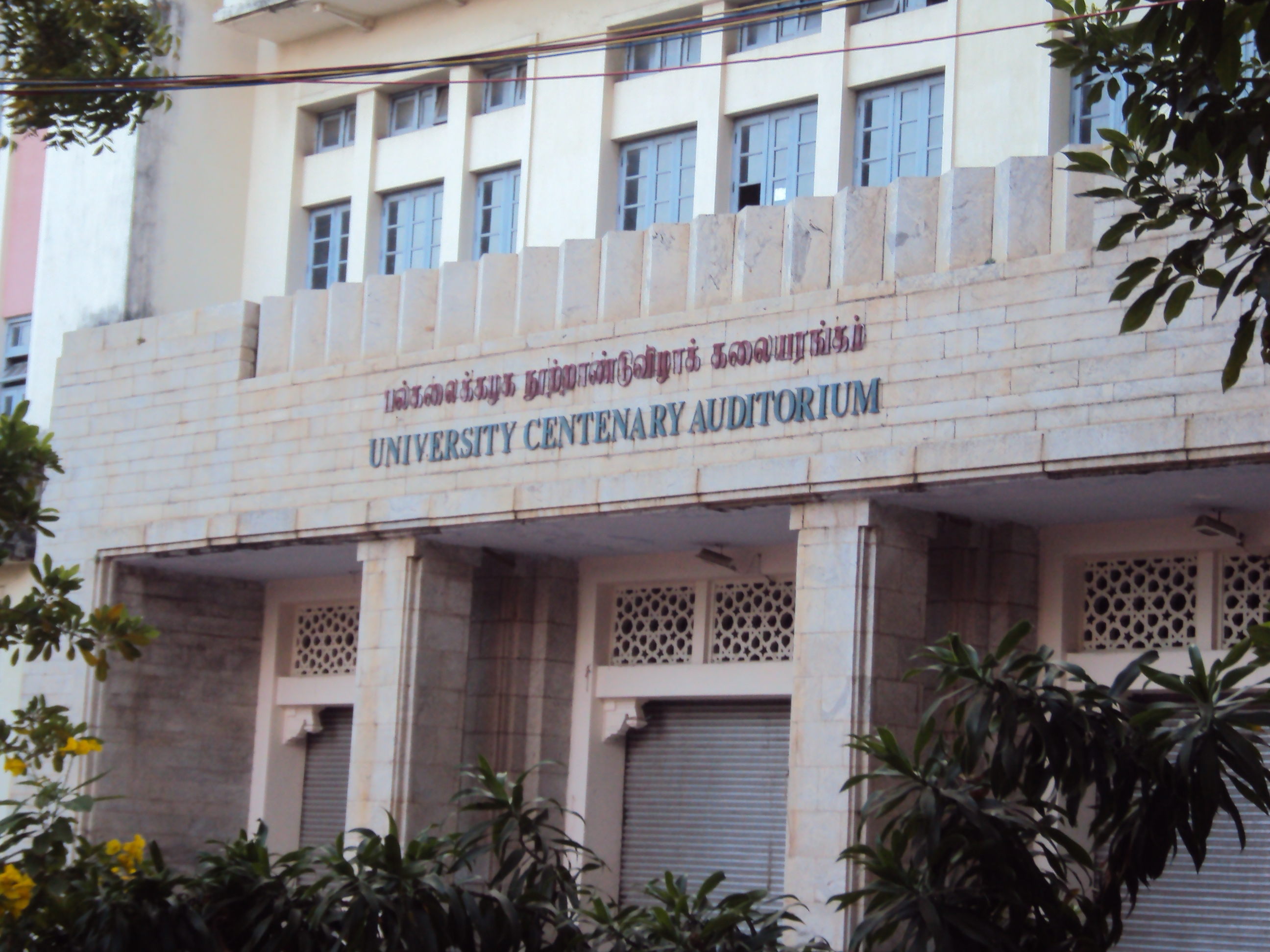
University auditorium

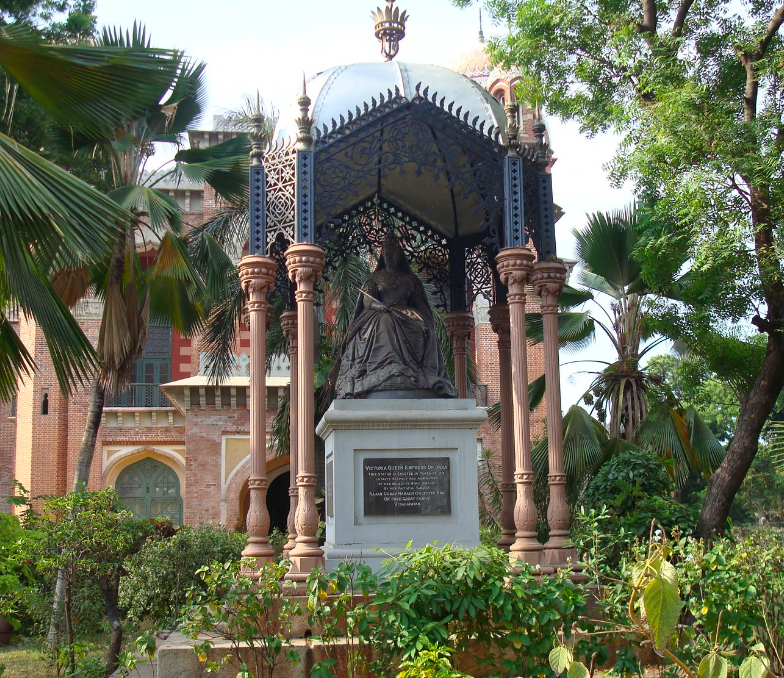
Queen Victoria Statue in Chepauk campus

The University of Madras has a historical monument – Senate House – which is one of the landmarks of the city of Chennai. The Senate House, the university's first building, inaugurated in the year 1879, is considered a masterpiece of Robert Fellowes Chisholm, an architect of the 19th century, who blended the Indo-Saracenic style with Byzantine and European architectural features. The university renovated the Senate House in 2006.

Madras University campus
Interior view of the Senate House

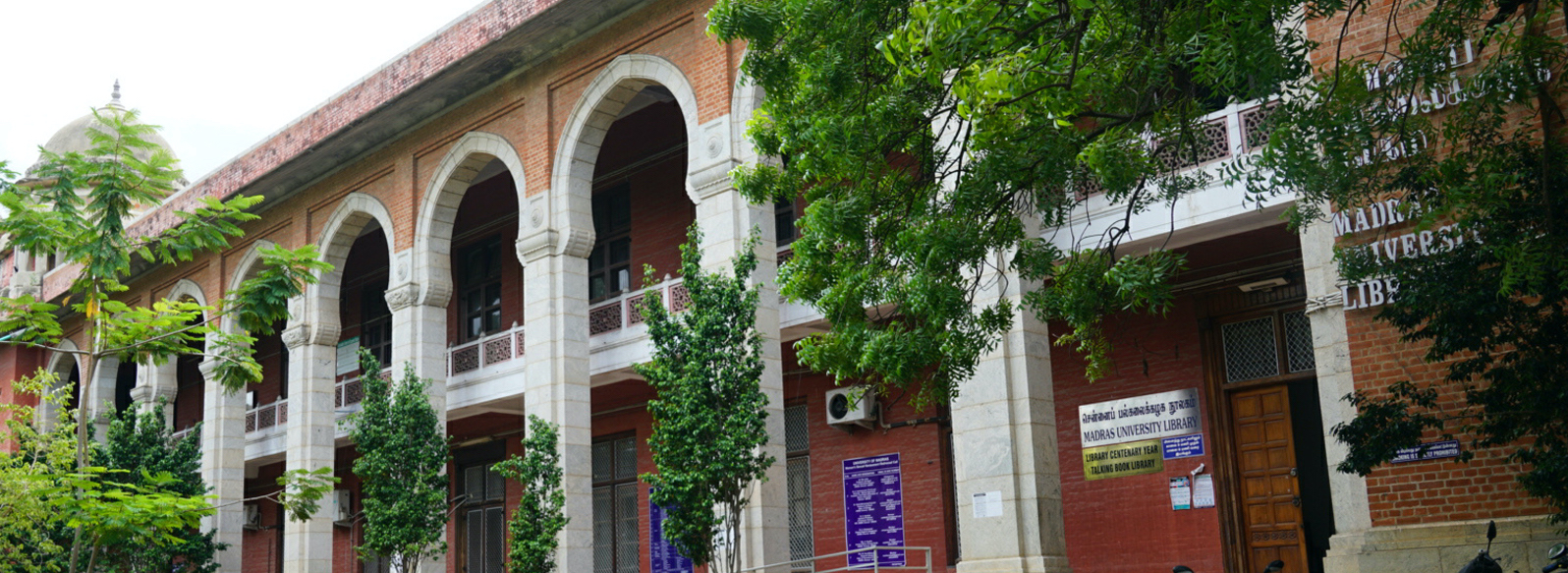
Main Library building at Chepauk

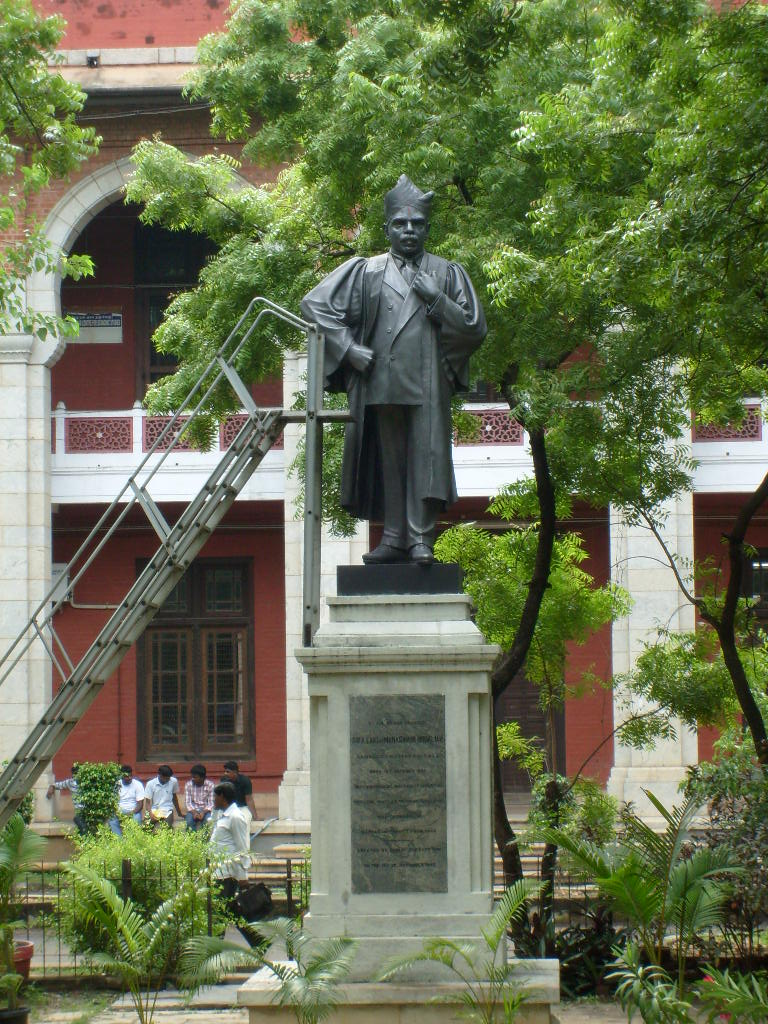
Statue of the A. L. Mudaliar near Senate House

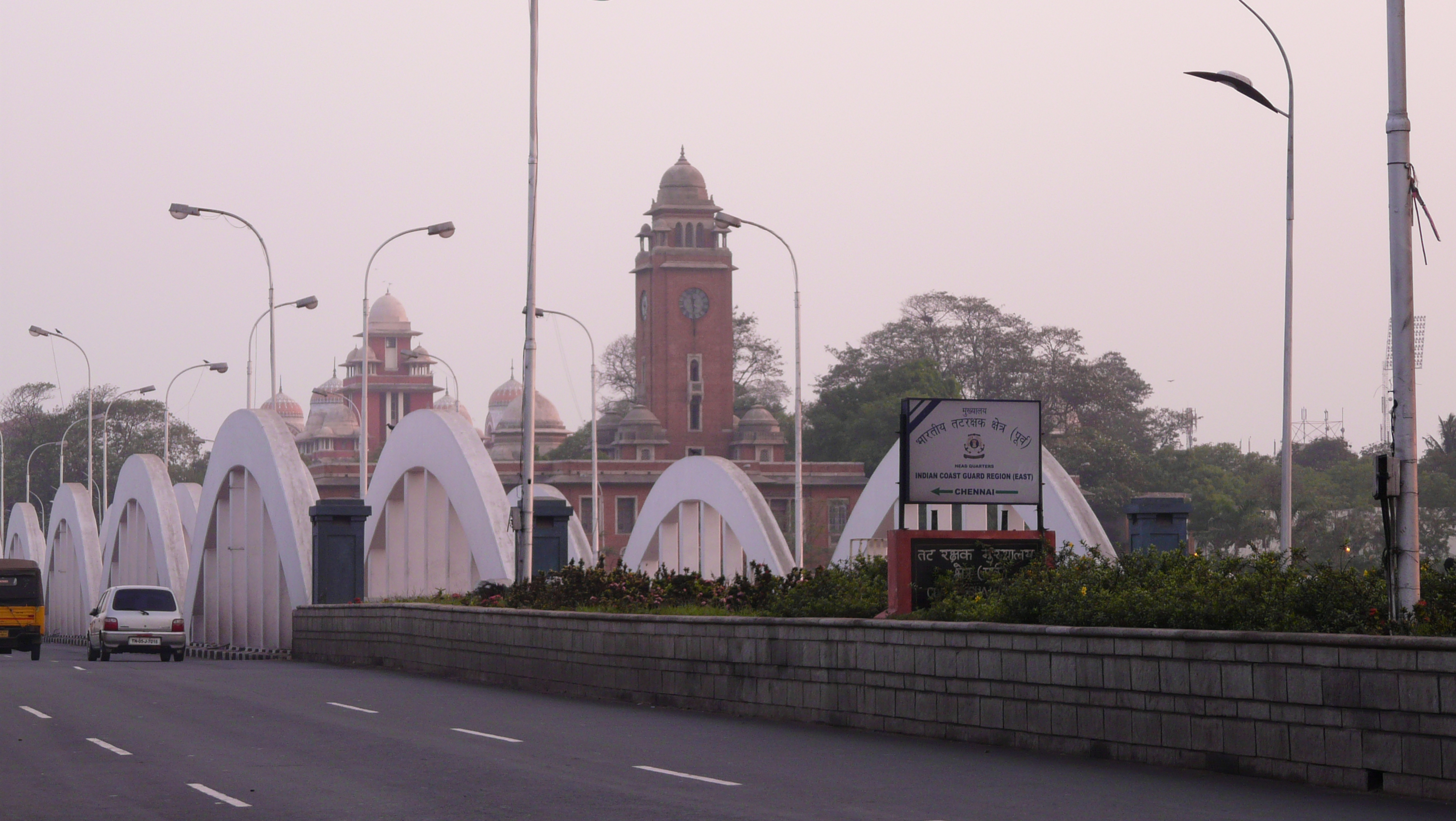
View of Clock Tower and Centenary building from Napier Bridge

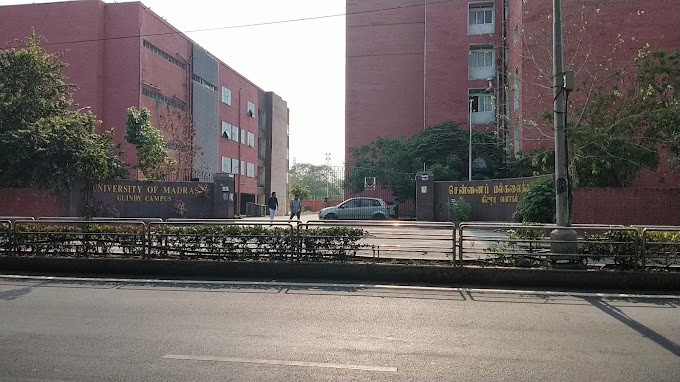
New Academic block of the Guindy campus

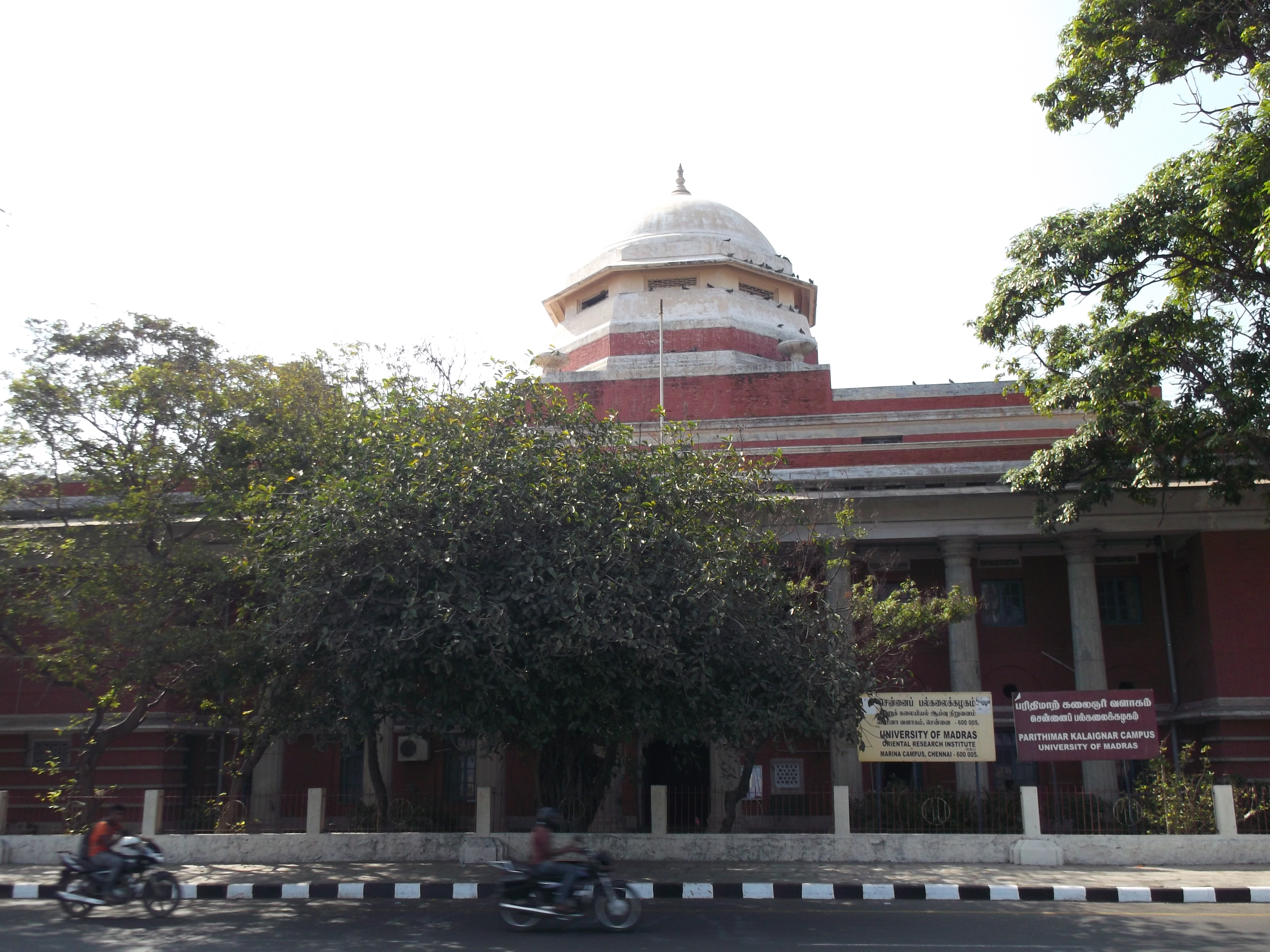
Façade of the Marina campus

== Faculties, Institutions and Affiliated Colleges ==
=== Governance ===
The organisational structure of Madras University consists of the Senate, the Syndicate, the Academic Council, the faculties, the Finance Committee, and the boards of studies. The Governor of Tamil Nadu is the chancellor of the university. The vice chancellor is the executive head of the university. The registrar of the university, who is the secretary of the Syndicate, is the custodian of all the records and chief administrator of the university. The examinations of the university is managed by Office of the Controller of Examinations.

=== Faculties and Institutes ===
University of Madras is organized into eighteen main schools, each of which comprises multiple departments and centres as below:

Faculties	Departments / Institutes / Chairs	Campus Location
Mathematics, Statistics and Computer Science	Department of Computer Science; Ramanujan Institute for Advanced Study in Mathematics; Department of Statistics; Centre for Web-Based Learning	Chepauk and Guindy
Chemistry	Department of Analytical Chemistry; Department of Energy; Department of Inorganic Chemistry; Department of Organic Chemistry; Department of Physical Chemistry; Department of Polymer Science	Guindy
Physics	Central Instrumentation and Service Laboratory; Centre for Advanced Study in Crystallography and Biophysics; Department of Nuclear Physics; Department of Theoretical Physics; Department of Network Systems and Information Technology; Department of Material Science	Guindy
Nano Science and Photonics	National Centre for Nanosciences and Nanotechnology; National Centre for Ultrafast Process	Guindy and Taramani
Earth and Atmospheric Science	Department of Applied Geology; Department of Geography; Department of Geology; Centre for Environmental Sciences; Centre for Natural Hazards and Disaster Studies; Centre for Water Resource Management	Guindy
Life Sciences	Department of Biochemistry; Department of Biotechnology; Centre for Advanced Study in Botany; Centre for Ocean and Coastal Studies; Centre for Stem Cell Research; Centre for Herbal Sciences; Department of Zoology; Department of Bio-informatics	Guindy
Basic Medical Sciences	Department of Anatomy; Department of Endocrinology; Department of Genetics; Department of Medical Biochemistry; Department of Microbiology; Department of Pathology; Department of Pharmacology and Environmental Toxicology; Department of Physiology; National Centre for Neurotoxicity Research to Assist Drug Development	Taramani
Economics	Centre for Population Studies; Dr. Ambedkar Centre for Economic Studies; Department of Econometrics; Department of Economics; Agro-Economic Research Centre	Chepauk
Philosophy and Religious Studies	Department of Christian Studies; JBAS Centre for Islamic Studies; Department of Jainology; Department of Philosophy; Department of Saiva Siddhanta; Department of Vaishnavism; Centre for Buddhism	Chepauk and Marina
Historical Studies	Department of Ancient History and Archaeology; Department of Indian History	Chepauk
Social Sciences	Department of Adult and Continuing Education; Department of Anthropology; Department of Criminology; Department of Education; Department of Psychology; Department of Sociology; Department of Women's Studies; Department of Social Work; Department of Counselling Psychology; Centre for Cyber Forensics and Information Security; Dr. MGR Centenary Centre for Social Development Studies	Chepauk
Political and International Studies	Anna Centre for Public Affairs; UGC - Centre for South and Southeast Asian Studies; Department of Defence and Strategic Studies; Department of Legal Studies; Department of Politics and Public Administration; Rajiv Gandhi Chair in Contemporary Studies	Chepauk
Information and Communication Studies	Department of Journalism and Communication; Department of Library and Information Science	Chepauk
Fine and Performing Arts	Department of Indian Music	Chepauk
English and Foreign Languages	Department of English; Department of French and other Foreign Languages	Chepauk
Tamil and other Dravidian Languages	Department of Kannada; Department of Malayalam; Department of Tamil Language; Department of Tamil Literature; Department of Telugu; Department of Sangapalagai for Tamil Development; Centre for Thirukkural Research; Chair on Tamil Christian Literature; Centre for Endangered Languages; Centre for Research on Dravidian Movement	Marina
Sanskrit and other Indian Languages	Department of Arabic, Persian and Urdu; Department of Hindi; Department of Sanskrit	Marina
Business and Management	Department of Commerce; Department of Management Studies; Centre for Infrastructural Management Studies	Chepauk
Physical Education and Sports	Department of Physical Education and Sports	Chetpet

=== Affiliated research institutions ===
- Adyar Cancer Institute
- Central Leather Research Institute
- Central Institute of Brackish Water Aquaculture
- Defence Services Staff College
- International Institute of Tamil Studies
- Institute for Financial Management and Research
- King Institute of Preventive Medicine and Research
- Loyola Institute of Business Administration
- Madras Institute of Development Studies
- Madras School of Economics
- Madras Diabetes Research Foundation
- MS Swaminathan Research Foundation
- National Defence College
- National Institute for Research in Tuberculosis
- ZSI-Marine Biology Regional Centre
- National Institute of Technical Teachers Training and Research
- National Institute of Epidemiology

=== Affiliated colleges ===
The university currently has 121 affiliated colleges, with 3 approved institutions, 5 institutions for diploma and certificate courses, 15 stand alone institutions for professional education, and 53 approved research Institutions as of 2019.

==== Notable colleges ====
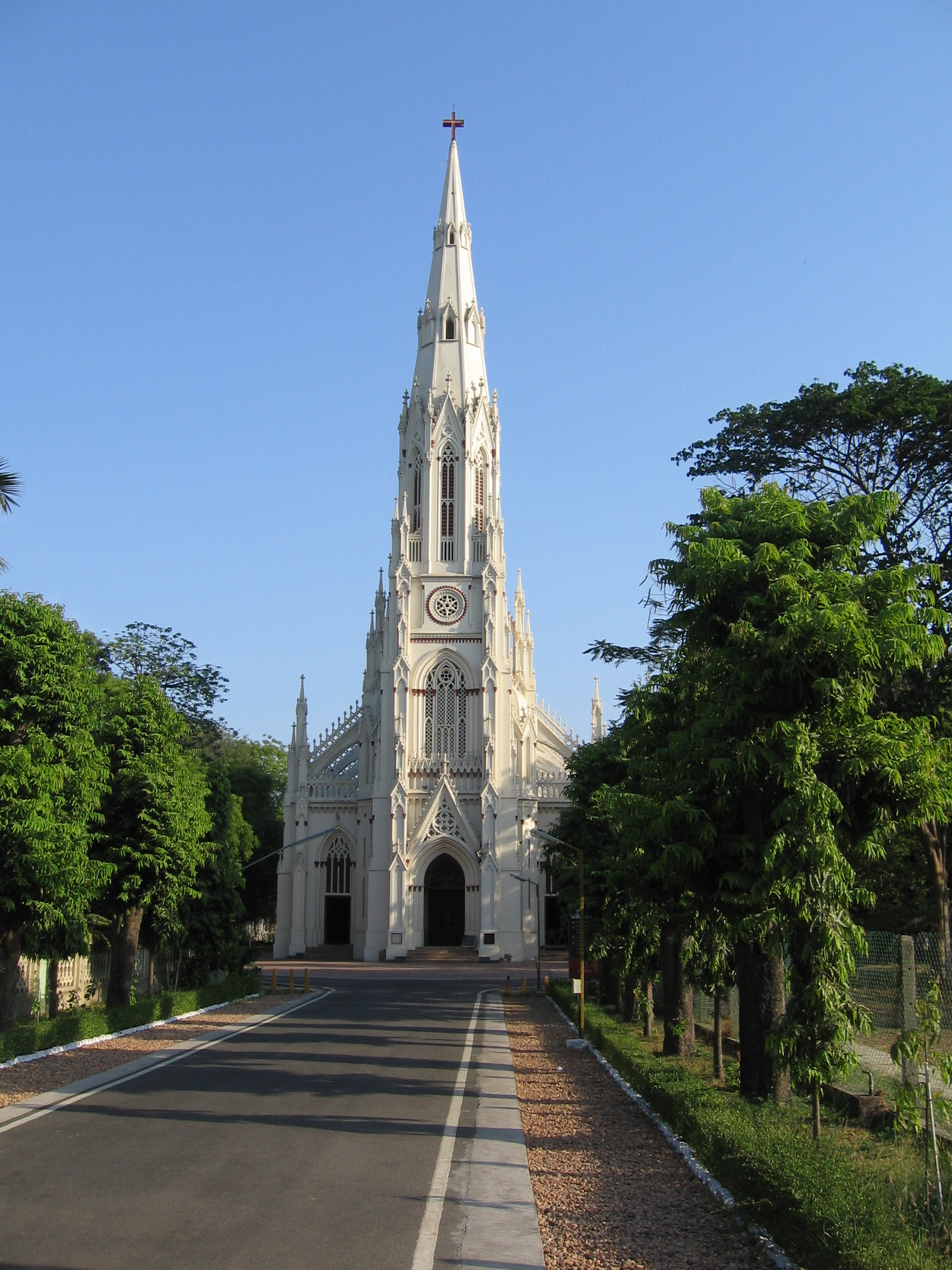
The Chapel at Loyola College

- Presidency College
- Madras Christian College
- Loyola College
- Stella Maris College
- Women's Christian College
- Queen Mary's College
- The New College
- Madras Sanskrit College
- Ethiraj College
- AM Jain College
- Guru Nanak College
- Vaishnav College
- Pachaiyappa's College
- Vaishnav College for Women
- Vivekananda College
- JBAS College for Women

== Academics ==
=== Rankings ===
University rankings

Global – Overall
- QS World: 526 (2024)

Global – Science and engineering
- QS Chemistry: 401-450 (2025)

Regional – Overall
- QS Asia: 251-269 (2023)

University rankings

General – India
- NIRF (Universities) (2024): 39
- Outlook India (Universities) (2020): 20

Business/Management – India
- Government colleges
- Outlook India (2022): 20

Internationally, Madras University is ranked 526 overall and 51st global research institution in the QS World University Rankings for the year 2024. In India, the National Institutional Ranking Framework ranked it 39th among universities in 2024. It was ranked 20th in the Outlook-ICARE university ranking of 2020.

=== Madras University Library System ===
The library system of the university consists of four central libraries located at its Chepauk, Marina, Guindy and Taramani campus. Besides, many of the departments and centres have their own library collections. The main university library located at Chepauk was started in 1907 in the Connemara Public Library, later shifted to the existing building in 1936. S. R. Ranganathan (a mathematician) was appointed as the first librarian of the university, whose contribution in the development of the field of library sciences is noteworthy. The library collection includes textbooks, reference books, journals, theses, archives of government gazettes, newsprints, magazines, photographs, rare manuscripts, with a total collection of approximately 1 million volumes, which is among the largest collection of a university library in India. The library system also maintains a database of e-books, digital multimedia resources and subscribed to over four thousand e-journals under the UGC-INFONET Digital Library Consortium. The Government of Tamil Nadu oriental manuscripts library and research centre is located within the main library building at Chepauk. The library is considered as the treasure house for ancient Indian knowledge. Comprises over 25,373 reference books and 72,714 Sanskrit and Tamil manuscripts written on palm leaf, copper plates, tree barks, leather etc. on subjects, like mathematics, astronomy, ayurveda, architecture, fine arts, grammar and literature. The Library of the Indian Mathematical Society, started in 1907 in Pune, is now housed in the campus of the Ramanujan Institute for Advanced Study in Mathematics.

=== Research ===
In 2007, the university was given a special grant of ₹100 crores by the Ministry of Human Resource Development to establish a nanotechnology research centre in commemoration of its sesqui-centenary (150th year) celebration. In 2011, University Grants Commission (UGC) selected the university for its third phase of University with Potential for Excellence (UPE) scheme, under which ₹25 crores were sanctioned for a period of five years. Earlier, the university was selected for the inaugural phase of the scheme in 2001-02 along with JNU, Hyderabad University, Jadavpur University and Pune University. The National Centre for Ultrafast Process (NCUFP) of the university has mobilized research grants to the tune ₹7 crores through several funded projects including the DST, CSIR, DRDO and UGC.

The Department of Crystallography and Biophysics was upgraded as a Centre of Advanced Study in 2007 and a grant of ₹2.53 crores was given for modernising research laboratories. The School of Life Sciences of the university received a grant of ₹5.24 crores by the Department of Biotechnology, under BUILDER (Boost to University of Interdisciplinary Life Science Departments for Education and Research) for strengthening teaching and research programmes during 2014–2019. A study performed by the NISTADS on the research performance of universities in India during 1998–2008 ranked Madras University at No. 5 based on publication for that period.

In addition, UGC has identified the School of Earth Sciences and Department of Zoology as the Centres of Excellence and has allotted ₹3.25 crores each for their development. In 2019, Ministry of Human Resource Development of Government of India granted ₹50 crores to the university for upgrading its research capabilities under Rashtriya Uchchatar Shiksha Abhiyan (RUSA) scheme.

== Notable alumni ==
Some prominent alumni include Nobel laureates C. V. Raman and S. Chandrasekhar, mathematicians Srinivasa Ramanujan K. S. Chandrasekharan, and S. R. Srinivasa Varadhan, leading scientists, Raja Ramanna, Rajagopala Chidambaram, M. Visvesvaraya, E. C. George Sudarshan, G. N. Ramachandran, Govindarajan Padmanaban, V. S. Ramachandran and Alladi Ramakrishnan Former presidents Sarvepalli Radhakrishnan, V. V. Giri, Neelam Sanjeeva Reddy, R. Venkataraman and A.P.J. Abdul Kalam, politicians Chakravarthi Rajagopalachari, C Subramaniam, CN Annadurai, and V. K. Krishna Menon, civil servants T. N. Seshan, Benegal Rama Rau, Y. Venugopal Reddy and C. Sylendra Babu Rhodes scholars Eric Prabhakar and Tanjore R. Anantharaman, pioneers Verghese Kurien, Raj Reddy and M. S. Swaminathan, economist K. N. Raj and C. Rangarajan, business persons Indra Nooyi, Ram Shriram and Prathap C. Reddy, artists and film personality M.G. Ramachandran, curator Deepa Subramanian, K. C. S. Paniker, Gemini Ganesan, Mani Ratnam and Mahesh Babu, sports stars Viswanathan Anand, Vijay Amritraj, Ramanathan Krishnan and Srinivas 'Venkat', and politician Kuniyil Kailashnathan among others.

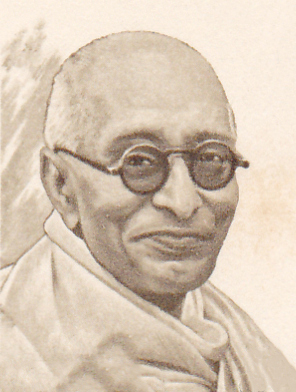
Last Governor-general of India, C. Rajagopalachari

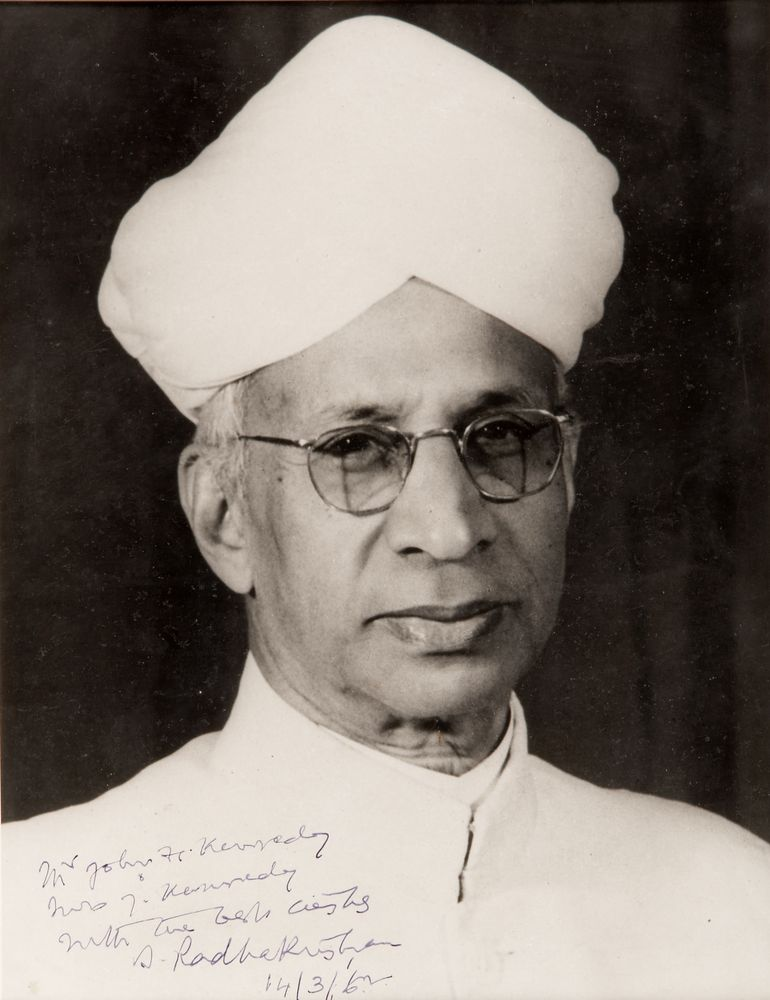
2nd President of India, Sarvepalli Radhakrishnan

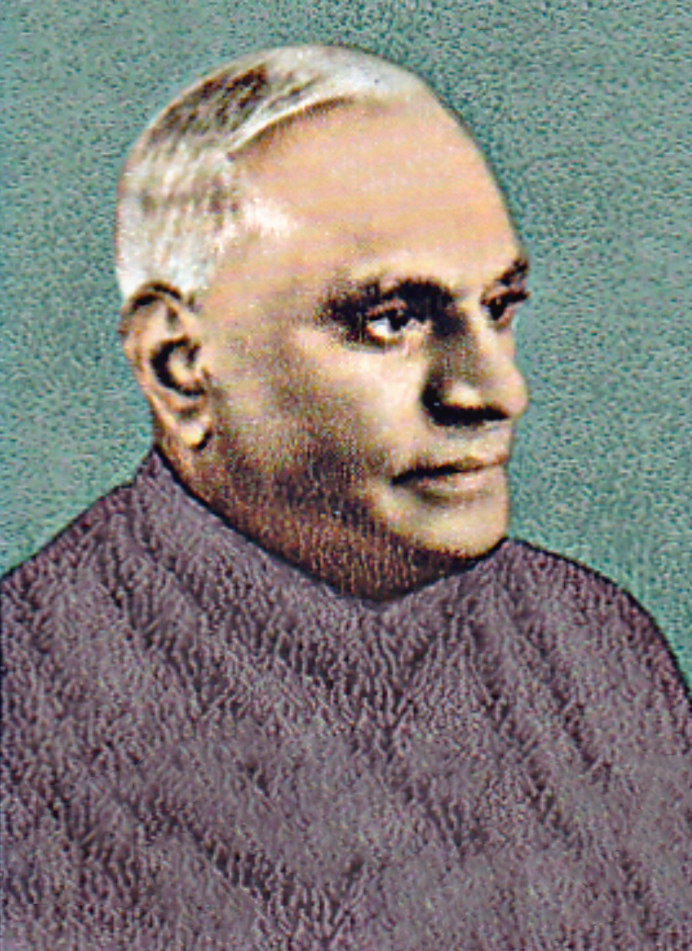
4th President of India, V.V. Giri

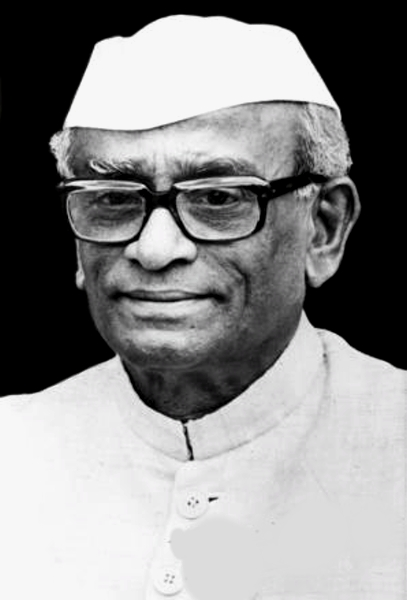
6th President of India, Neelam Sanjiva Reddy

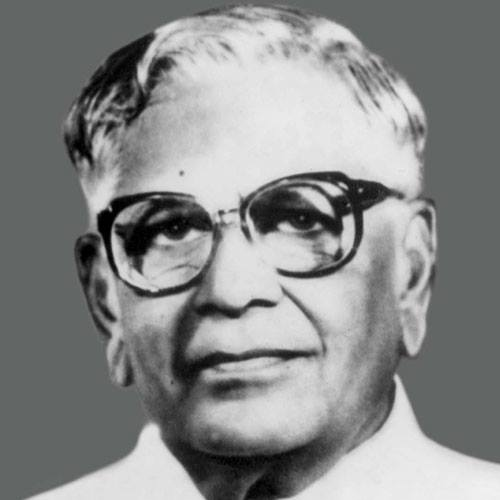
8th President of India, R Venkataraman

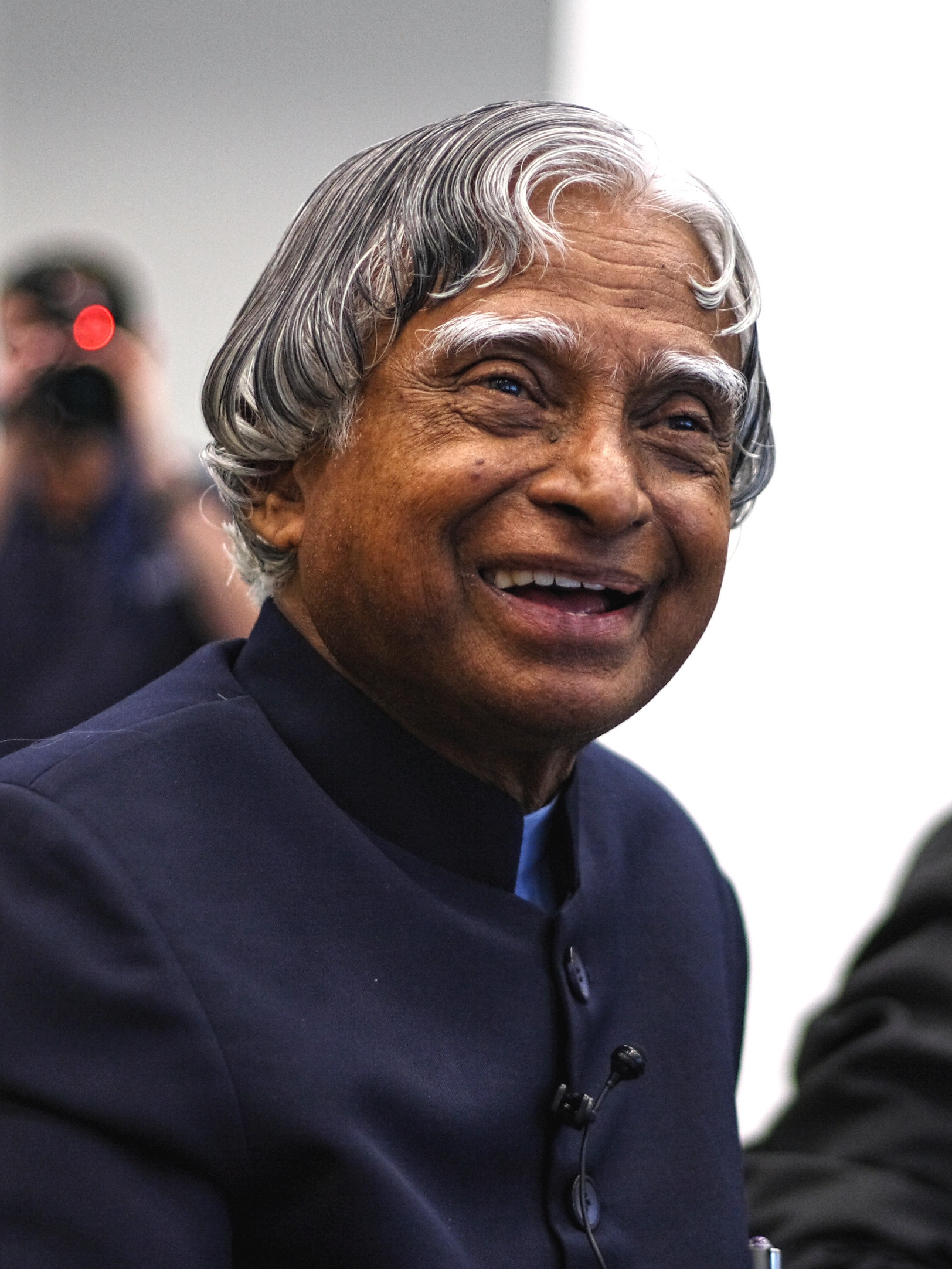
11th President of India, A.P.J. Abdul Kalam

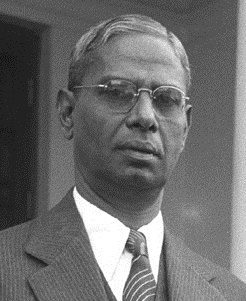
1st Finance Minister of India, R. K. Shanmukham Chetty

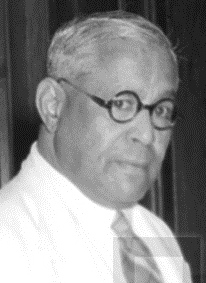
1st Railway Minister and 2nd Finance Minister of India, John Mathai

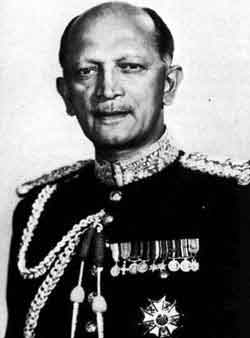
1st Indian Commander-in-chief of the Indian Army, Field Marshal K. M. Cariappa

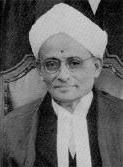
2nd Chief justice of India, M. Patanjali Sastri

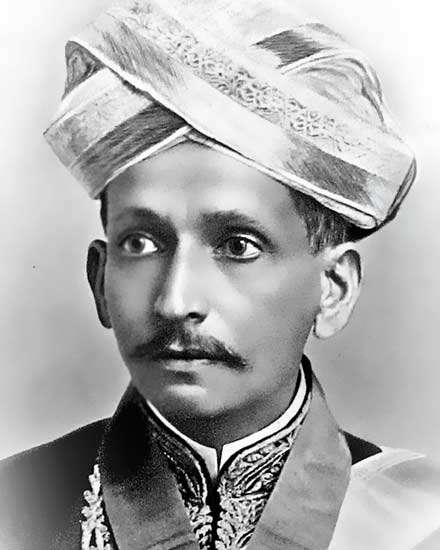
19th Diwan of Mysore and Civil Engineer, Sir. M. Visvesvaraya

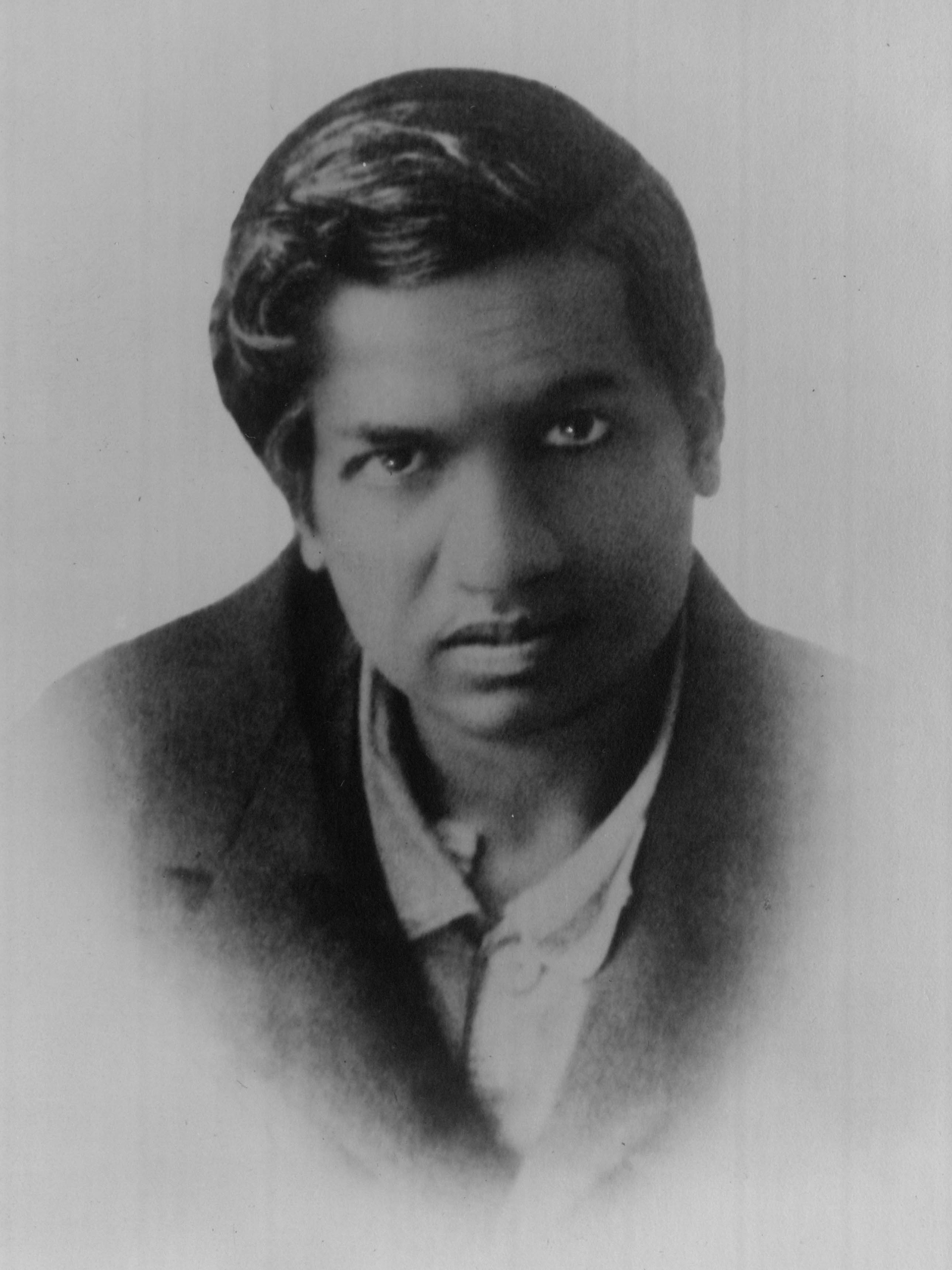
Mathematician, Srinivasa Ramanujan

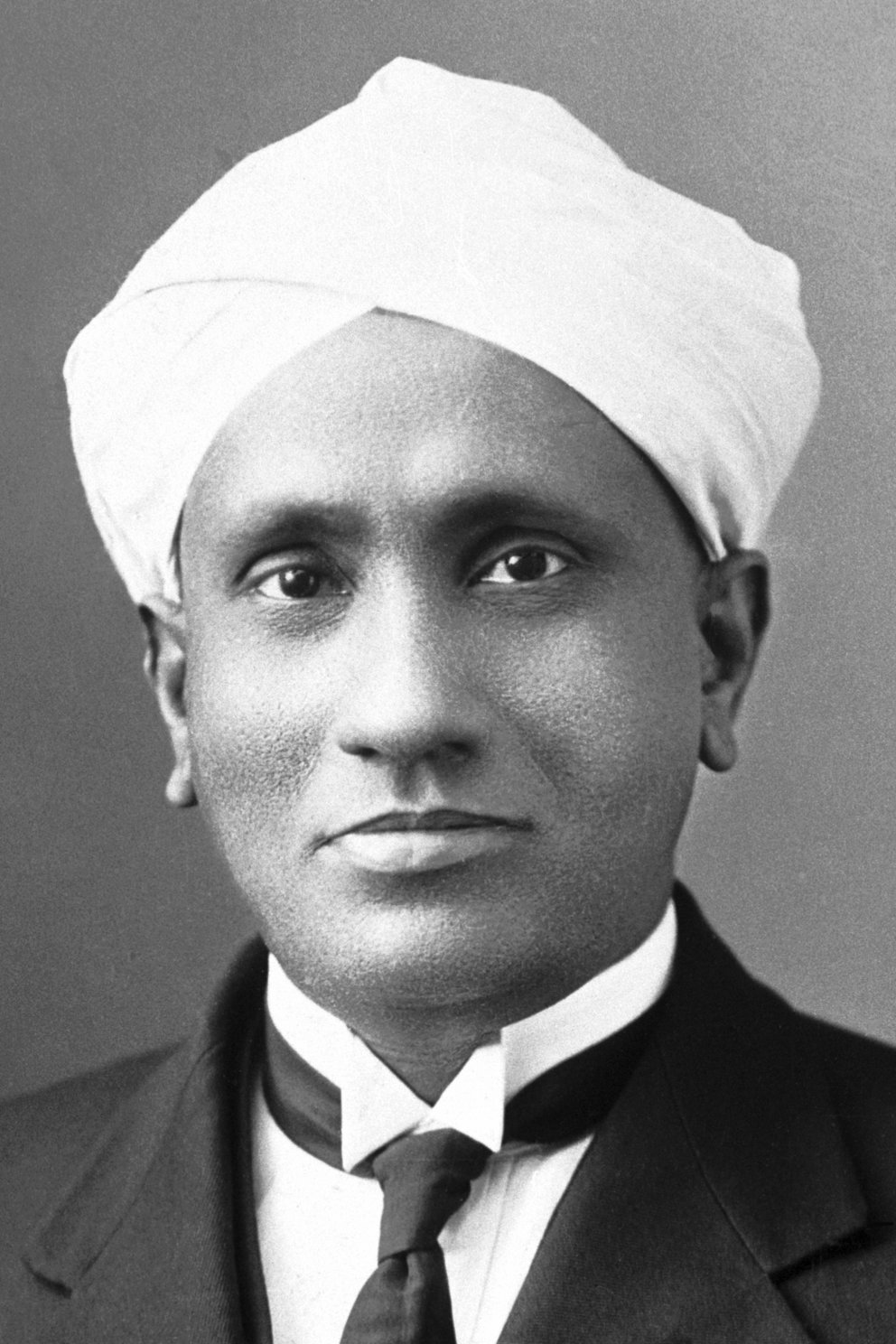
Nobel laureate in Physics, Sir C. V. Raman

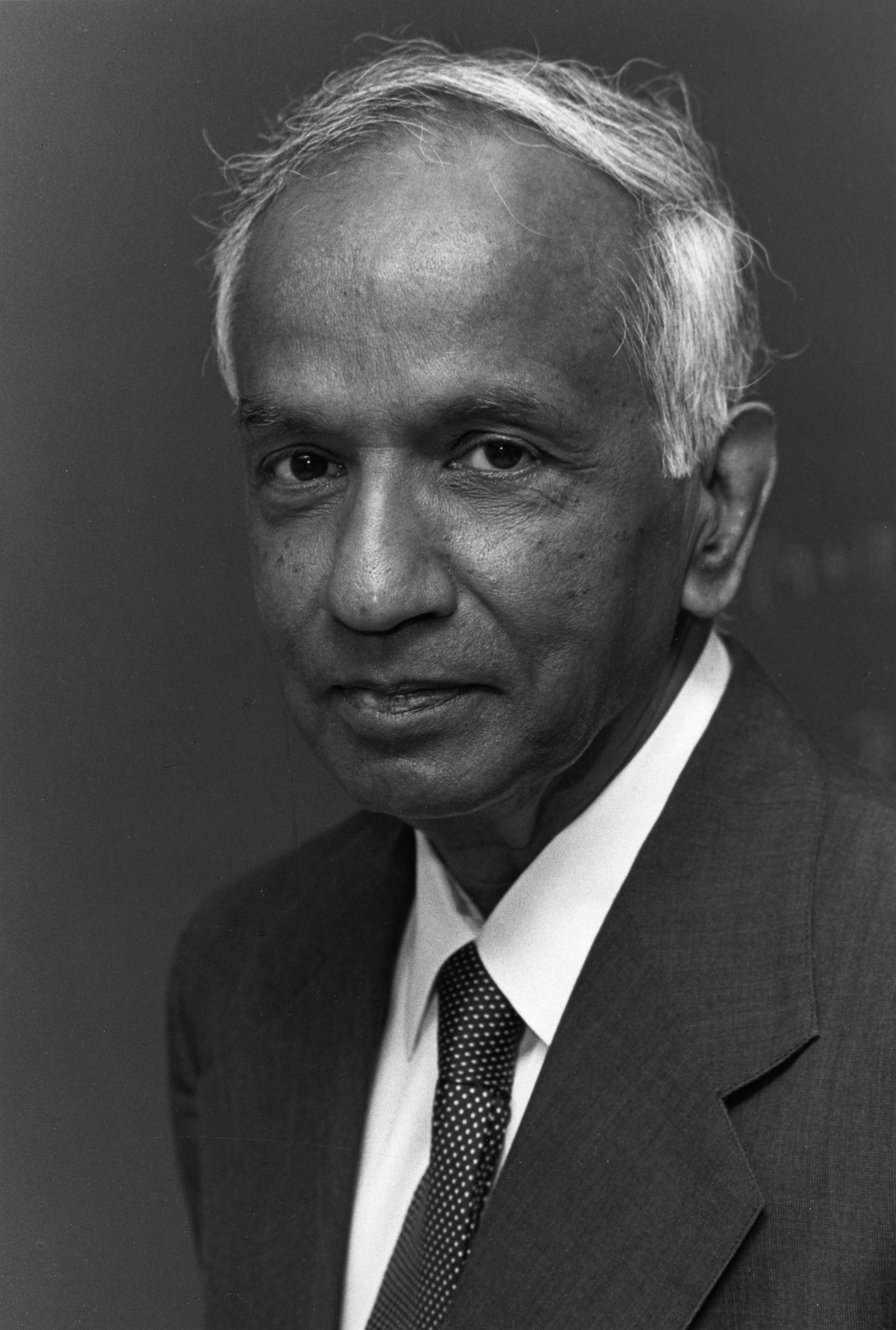
Nobel laureate in Physics, Subrahmanyan Chandrasekhar

== See also ==
- Ramanujan Institute for Advanced Study in Mathematics
