= List of judges of the Uttarakhand High Court =

The following is a list of judges of the Uttarakhand High Court since its inception on 9 November 2000. A total of 49 judges have served in the court (including sitting judges). The list has been arranged on the basis of date of retirement, or date of transfer with Chief Justices mentioned first.

== Chief Justices of the Uttarakhand High Court ==
Colour key

Incumbent

№	Name of the Chief Justice	Portrait	Term		Tenure	Parent High Court	Appointed by (President of India)
1	Ashok Desai^{‡}		9 November 2000	31 March 2003	2 years, 142 days	Bombay	K. R. Narayanan
2	Sarosh Homi Kapadia		5 August 2003	17 December 2003	134 days	Bombay	A. P. J. Abdul Kalam
3	Vikas Shridhar Sirpurkar		25 July 2004	19 March 2005	237 days	Bombay	A. P. J. Abdul Kalam
4	Cyriac Joseph		20 March 2005	7 January 2006	293 days	Kerala	A. P. J. Abdul Kalam
5	Rajiv Gupta		14 January 2006	1 February 2008	2 years, 18 days	Madhya Pradesh	A. P. J. Abdul Kalam
6	Vinod Kumar Gupta		2 February 2008	9 September 2009	1 year, 219 days	Jammu and Kashmir	Pratibha Patil
7	Jagdish Singh Khehar		29 November 2009	11 August 2010	255 days	Punjab and Haryana	Pratibha Patil
8	Barin Ghosh		12 August 2010	4 June 2014	3 years, 296 days	Calcutta	Pratibha Patil
9	Kuttiyil Mathew Joseph		31 July 2014	6 August 2018	4 years, 6 days	Kerala	Pranab Mukherjee
10	Ramesh Ranganathan		2 November 2018	27 July 2020	1 year, 268 days	Andhra Pradesh	Ram Nath Kovind
11	Raghvendra Singh Chauhan		7 January 2021	23 December 2021	350 days	Rajasthan	Ram Nath Kovind
12	Vipin Sanghi		28 June 2022	26 October 2023	1 year, 120 days	Delhi	Ram Nath Kovind
13	Ritu Bahri		4 February 2024	10 October 2024	249 days	Punjab and Haryana	Droupadi Murmu
14	Guhanathan Narendar		26 December 2024	9 January 2026	1 year, 14 days	Karnataka	Droupadi Murmu
15	Manoj Kumar Gupta		10 January 2026	8 October 2026	271 days	Allahabad	Droupadi Murmu

== Judges of the Uttarakhand High Court ==
Colour key

Incumbent

№	Name	Term started	Term ended	Tenure	Parent High Court	Appointed by (President of India)
1	Mahesh Chand Jain	9 November 2000	8 November 2001	364 days	Allahabad	K. R. Narayanan
2	Prakash Chandra Verma	9 November 2000	19 January 2009	8 years, 71 days	Allahabad	K. R. Narayanan
3	Irshad Hussain	28 February 2002	1 January 2006	3 years, 307 days	Uttarakhand	K. R. Narayanan
4	Madan Mohan Ghildiyal	18 November 2002	2 January 2008	5 years, 45 days	Uttarakhand	A. P. J. Abdul Kalam
5	Rajesh Tandon	3 July 2003	30 June 2008	4 years, 363 days	Uttarakhand	A. P. J. Abdul Kalam
6	Bipin Chandra Kandpal	29 June 2004	16 August 2010	6 years, 48 days	Uttarakhand	A. P. J. Abdul Kalam
7	Jagdish Chandra Singh Rawat	29 June 2004	30 September 2009	5 years, 93 days	Uttarakhand	A. P. J. Abdul Kalam
8	Prafulla Chandra Pant	29 June 2004	19 September 2013	9 years, 82 days	Uttarakhand	A. P. J. Abdul Kalam
9	Brahma Singh Verma	15 July 2004	2 May 2014	9 years, 291 days	Uttarakhand	A. P. J. Abdul Kalam
10	Dharam Veer^{†}	23 September 2006	16 November 2010	4 years, 54 days	Uttarakhand	A. P. J. Abdul Kalam
11	Sudhanshu Dhulia	1 November 2008	9 January 2021	12 years, 69 days	Uttarakhand	Pratibha Patil
12	Vijay Kumar Bist	1 November 2008	29 October 2018	9 years, 362 days	Uttarakhand	Pratibha Patil
13	Tarun Agarwala	25 September 2009	2 October 2012	3 years, 7 days	Allahabad	Pratibha Patil
14	Alok Singh	12 October 2009	20 December 2009	69 days	Uttarakhand	Pratibha Patil
14	Alok Singh	26 February 2013	2 April 2020	7 years, 36 days (total 7 years 105 days)	Uttarakhand	Pranab Mukherjee
15	Nirmal Yadav	11 February 2010	3 March 2011	1 year, 20 days	Punjab and Haryana	Pratibha Patil
16	Servesh Kumar Gupta	21 April 2011	31 December 2017	6 years, 254 days	Uttarakhand	Pratibha Patil
17	Umesh Chandra Dhyani	13 September 2011	13 February 2018	6 years, 153 days	Uttarakhand	Pratibha Patil
18	Kalyan Jyoti Sengupta	31 October 2012	20 May 2013	201 days	Calcutta	Pratibha Patil
19	Rajeev Sharma	26 September 2016	12 November 2018	2 years, 47 days	Himachal Pradesh	Pranab Mukherjee
20	Lok Pal Singh	19 May 2017	14 February 2021	3 years, 271 days	Uttarakhand	Pranab Mukherjee
21	Manoj Kumar Tiwari	19 May 2017	Incumbent	9 years, 150 days	Uttarakhand	Pranab Mukherjee
22	Sharad Kumar Sharma	19 May 2017	31 December 2023	6 years, 226 days	Uttarakhand	Pranab Mukherjee
23	Narayan Singh Dhanik	3 December 2018	19 May 2022	3 years, 167 days	Uttarakhand	Ram Nath Kovind
24	Ramesh Chandra Khulbe	3 December 2018	2 January 2023	4 years, 30 days	Uttarakhand	Ram Nath Kovind
25	Ravindra Maithani	3 December 2018	Incumbent	7 years, 317 days	Uttarakhand	Ram Nath Kovind
26	Alok Kumar Verma	27 May 2019	Incumbent	7 years, 142 days	Uttarakhand	Ram Nath Kovind
27	Ravi Malimath	5 March 2020	6 January 2021	307 days	Karnataka	Ram Nath Kovind
28	Sanjaya Kumar Mishra	11 October 2021	19 February 2023	1 year, 131 days	Orissa	Ram Nath Kovind
29	Pankaj Purohit	28 April 2023	Incumbent	3 years, 171 days	Uttarakhand	Droupadi Murmu
30	Rakesh Thapliyal	28 April 2023	Incumbent	2 years, 45 days	Uttarakhand	Droupadi Murmu
31	Vivek Bharti Sharma	28 April 2023	12 June 2025	3 years, 171 days	Uttarakhand	Droupadi Murmu
32	Ashish Naithani	9 January 2025	Incumbent	1 year, 280 days	Uttarakhand	Droupadi Murmu
33	Alok Mahra	14 February 2025	Incumbent	1 year, 244 days	Uttarakhand	Droupadi Murmu
34	Subhash Upadhyay	30 May 2025	Incumbent	1 year, 139 days	Uttarakhand	Droupadi Murmu
35	Siddharth Sah	8 January 2026	Incumbent	281 days	Uttarakhand	Droupadi Murmu

== Notes ==
- ^{†} – Died in office
- ^{‡} – Resigned
- ^{*} – Incumbent

== See also ==
- Uttarakhand High Court
- List of chief justices of the Uttarakhand High Court
- List of sitting judges of the high courts of India
- List of sitting judges of the Supreme Court of India
- Bar Council of Uttarakhand
- Uttarakhand Lokayukta
- Government of Uttarakhand
- Governor of Uttarakhand
- Chief Minister of Uttarakhand
- Cabinet of Uttarakhand
- Speaker of the Uttarakhand Legislative Assembly
- Leader of the Opposition in the Uttarakhand Legislative Assembly
