= List of chief justices of the Uttarakhand High Court =

Chief Justice of Uttarakhand High Court
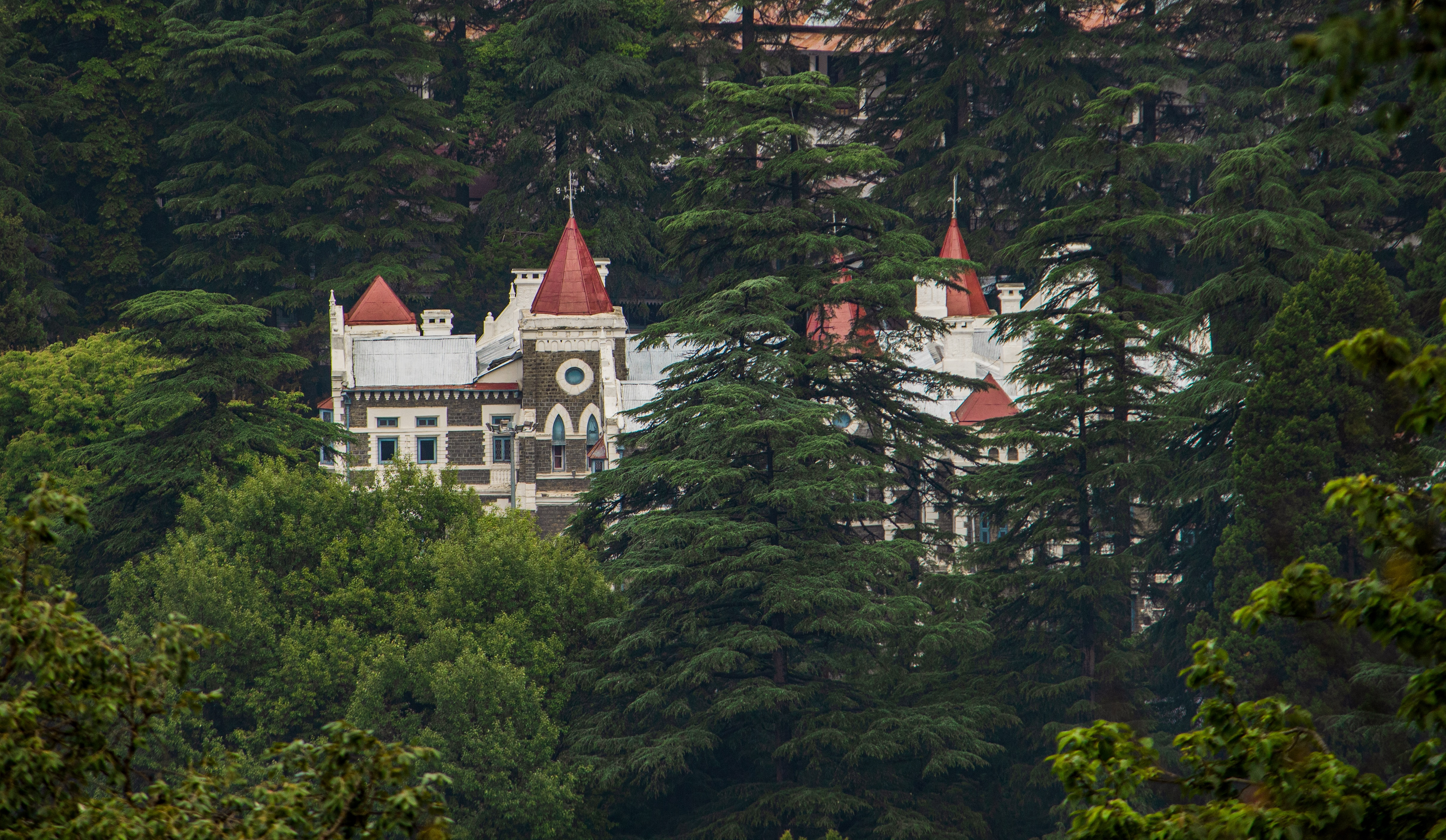
- Incumbent; Manoj Kumar Tiwari (acting) since 9 October 2026
- Uttarakhand High Court
- Abbreviation: CJ
- Seat: Nainital
- Nominator: Collegium of the Supreme Court of India
- Appointer: President of India with confirmation of Chief Justice of India and Governor of Uttarakhand
- Term length: till the age of 62 yrs
- Constituting instrument: Constitution of India (under Article 217)
- Formation: 9 November 2000; 26 years ago
- First holder: Ashok Desai (2000–2003)
- Website: Uttarakhand High Court

The chief justice of the Uttarakhand High Court is the highest presiding judicial officer in the state of Uttarakhand in India and the custodian of the Uttarakhand High Court. The chief justice is appointed by the President of India with the advice of the chief justice and the Governor of Uttarakhand. Manoj Kumar Tiwari is the current acting Chief Justice of the Uttarakhand High Court. He assumed office on 9 October 2026.

== List of chief justices of Uttarakhand ==
The Uttarakhand High Court was established on 9 November 2000 under Uttar Pradesh Reorganisation Act, 2000 and has had 15 permanent Chief Justices and several Acting Chief Justices.

Colour Key

- Served as Chief Justice of India
- Female Chief Justice
- Elevated to Supreme Court of India
- Female chief justice elevated to Supreme Court of India

Symbol Key

- ^{‡} Resigned
- ^{†} Died in office

Chief Justices elevated to Supreme Court of India includes those who were elevated to supreme court at any point of their career.

Chief Justices mentioned in italics were those who were serving as Acting Chief Justice in the same high court immediately before their permanent appointment.

Date of initial appointment - Date of first appointment as High court judge

CJ - Chief Justice

#	Name	Portrait	Date of appointment	Date of retirement	Tenure	Parent High Court	Date of initial appointment	Notes
1 Expand	Ashok Desai		6 December 2000	31 March 2003^{[‡]}	2 years, 116 days	Bombay	21 November 1986	(Note: Desai was serving as Judge of Allahabad High Court when he was transferred as ACJ upon creation of Uttarakhand High Court and served as such from 9 November 2000 to 5 December 2000 for 27 days before becoming permanent Chief Justice)
--	Prakash Chandra Verma		1 April 2003	4 August 2003	126 days	Allahabad	5 February 1999	
2 Expand	Sarosh Homi Kapadia		5 August 2003	17 December 2003	135 days	Bombay	8 October 1991	(Note: Shortest-serving Chief Justice of Uttarakhand. Elevated as a judge to the Supreme Court of India, went on to become 38th Chief Justice of India.)
--	Prakash Chandra Verma		18 December 2003	24 July 2004	220 days	Allahabad	5 February 1999	
3	Vikas Shridhar Sirpurkar		25 July 2004	19 March 2005	238 days	Bombay	9 November 1992	(Note: Transferred to Calcutta High Court)
4 Expand	Cyriac Joseph		20 March 2005	6 January 2006	293 days	Kerala	6 July 1994	(Note: Transferred to Karnataka High Court)
--	Prakash Chandra Verma		7 January 2006	13 January 2006	7 days	Allahabad	5 February 1999	(Note: Longest-serving Acting Chief Justice of Uttarakhand with total tenure of 349 days as ACJ)
5	Rajeev Gupta		14 January 2006	1 February 2008	2 years, 19 days	Madhya Pradesh	27 September 1994	(Note: CJ of Kerala High Court transferred as CJ of Uttarakhand and subsequently transferred as CJ to Chhattisgarh High Court)
6 Expand	Vinod Kumar Gupta		2 February 2008	9 September 2009	1 year, 220 days	Jammu & Kashmir	7 November 1990	(Note: CJ of Himachal Pradesh High Court transferred as CJ of Uttarakhand)
--	Bipin Chandra Kandapal		10 September 2009	25 September 2009	16 days	Uttarakhand	29 June 2004	
--	Tarun Agarwala		25 September 2009	28 November 2009	65 days	Allahabad	7 January 2004	(Note: Judge of Allahabad High Court transferred as ACJ)
7	Jagdish Singh Khehar		29 November 2009	7 August 2010	252 days	Punjab & Haryana	8 February 1999	(Note: Transferred to Karnataka High Court. Later elevated as a judge to the Supreme Court of India, went on to become 44th Chief Justice of India.)
8 Expand	Barin Ghosh		12 August 2010	4 June 2014	3 years, 297 days	Calcutta	14 July 1995	(Note: CJ of Sikkim High Court transferred as CJ of Uttarakhand)
--	V. K. Bist		5 June 2014	30 July 2014	56 days	Uttarakhand	1 November 2008	
9 Expand	Kuttiyil Mathew Joseph		31 July 2014	6 August 2018	4 years, 7 days	Kerala	14 October 2004	(Note: Longest-serving Chief Justice of Uttarakhand, Elevated as a judge to the Supreme Court of India.)
--	Rajeev Sharma		7 August 2018	2 November 2018	87 days	Himachal Pradesh	3 April 2007	
10 Expand	Ramesh Ranganathan		2 November 2018	27 July 2020	1 year, 269 days	Andhra Pradesh	26 May 2005	
--	Ravi Malimath		28 July 2020	6 January 2021	132 days	Karnataka	18 February 2008	(Note: Transferred as Judge to Himachal Pradesh High Court)
11 Expand	Raghvendra Singh Chauhan		7 January 2021	23 December 2021	351 days	Rajasthan	13 June 2005	(Note: CJ of Telangana High Court transferred as CJ of Uttarakhand)
--	Sanjaya Kumar Mishra		24 December 2021	28 June 2022	187 days	Orissa	7 October 2009	
12 Expand	Vipin Sanghi		28 June 2022	26 October 2023	1 year, 121 days	Delhi	29 May 2006	
--	M. K. Tiwari		27 October 2023	3 February 2024	100 days	Uttarakhand	19 May 2017	
13 Expand	Ritu Bahri		4 February 2024	10 October 2024	250 days	Punjab & Haryana	16 August 2010	(Note: First female Chief Justice of Uttarakhand.)
--	M. K. Tiwari		11 October 2024	25 December 2024	76 days	Uttarakhand	19 May 2017	
14	Guhanathan Narendar		26 December 2024	9 January 2026	1 year, 15 days	Karnataka	2 January 2015	
15	Manoj Kumar Gupta		10 January 2026	8 October 2026	272 days	Allahabad	12 April 2013	

== See also ==
- Uttarakhand High Court
- List of judges of the Uttarakhand High Court
- List of current Indian chief justices
- List of female chief justices in India
- List of sitting judges of the high courts of India
- List of chief justices of India
- List of sitting judges of the Supreme Court of India
- Bar Council of Uttarakhand
- Uttarakhand Lokayukta
- Government of Uttarakhand
- Governor of Uttarakhand
- Chief Minister of Uttarakhand
- Cabinet of Uttarakhand
- Speaker of the Uttarakhand Legislative Assembly
- Leader of the Opposition in the Uttarakhand Legislative Assembly
