= Ravindra Maithani =

Indian Judge

Hon'ble Mr. Justice Ravindra Maithani

Judge, High Court of Uttarakhand
- Incumbent
- Assumed office 3 December 2018
- Nominated by: Ranjan Gogoi
- Appointed by: Ram Nath Kovind

Personal details
- Born: 25 June 1965 (age 60) Chamoli, India

Justice Ravindra Maithani (born 25 June 1965, in Chamoli district) is an Indian judge at the High Court of Uttarakhand at Nainital since December 2018. He is due to retire not earlier than June 2027.

== Career ==
Maithani obtained his Bachelors in Science and Law from Garhwal University at Srinagar, Uttarakhand. Thereafter, he joined the Judicial services of the undivided Uttar Pradesh state in 1986 and worked at various district-level courts. Maithani has also been Deputy Director of the Institute of Judicial Training Research at Lucknow, a Member of the Uttarakhand Trade Tax Tribunal and an Additional Director at the Uttarakhand Judicial & Legal Academy, Nainital. In March 2009, he was appointed the Registrar General of the Uttarakhand High Court post which he was sent to the Supreme Court of India as Registrar in September 2010. Maithani was also the Secretary General of the Indian Supreme Court from May 2013 till November 2014.

A Supreme Court Collegium consisting of Justices Ranjan Gogoi CJI, Madan Lokur and Kurian Joseph recommended his name to the President of India in October 2018 for appointment as a judge of the Uttarakhand High Court. He was sworn in by Chief Justice Ramesh Ranganathan on 3 December 2018.

== Notable judgements ==
- In December 2020, a Division Bench of Uttarakhand High Court with Justices Ravi Malimath and Maithani on it directed the local administration of tourist destinations Mussoorie and Nainital to test every incoming tourist for COVID-19 before permitting them entry.
- A Single Bench of the High Court led by him cancelled a First Information Report against a journalist who had made corruption allegations against the-then Chief Minister of Uttarakhand Trivendra Singh Rawat in October 2020. It also demanded all case-related documents to be submitted to the Court and ordered an enquiry by the Central Bureau of Investigation.
- Maithani was part of a Division Bench of the High Court along with Justice Sudhanshu Dhulia which asked the Government of Uttarakhand to consider paying half of the Minimum Support Price due to the wheat farmers of the state in April 2020. This was in view of the urgency created by the COVID-19 pandemic.
