= List of chief secretaries of Uttarakhand =

Chief Secretary of Government of Uttarakhand

- Incumbent; Anand Bardhan since 1 April 2025
- Abbreviation: CS
- Reports to: Governor and Chief Minister
- Appointer: Chief Minister of Uttarakhand
- Inaugural holder: Ajay Vikram Singh (2000–2001)
- Formation: 9 November 2000 (25 years ago)

The Chief Secretary of Uttarakhand is the senior-most civil servant in Uttarakhand. The secretary acts as the ex-officio Secretary to the Uttarakhand Council of Ministers, therefore is also known as Secretary to the Cabinet. The Chief secretary is the Head of the Uttarakhand Cabinet Secretariat Department. The functions include providing secretarial assistance to the cabinet, ensuring the implementation of decisions, acting as the policy coordination centre, serving as a data bank of information, organizing conferences. The Chief Secretary is an officer of Indian Administrative Service and is a member of the executive branch of the Government of Uttarakhand. The Chief Secretary ranks 23rd on the Indian order of precedence.

Anand Bardhan is the incumbent Chief Secretary of Uttarakhand since 1 April 2025.

== List of chief secretaries of Uttarakhand ==
No.	Name	Tenure			Chief Minister
1	Ajay Vikram Singh	9 November 2000	31 August 2001	295 days	Nityanand Swami
2	Madhukar Gupta	1 September 2001	31 August 2003	1 year, 364 days	
2	Madhukar Gupta	1 September 2001	31 August 2003	1 year, 364 days	Bhagat Singh Koshyari
2	Madhukar Gupta	1 September 2001	31 August 2003	1 year, 364 days	N. D. Tiwari
3	Raghunandan Singh Tolia	1 September 2003	30 September 2005	2 years, 29 days	N. D. Tiwari
4	M. Ramachandran	1 October 2005	31 October 2006	1 year, 30 days	N. D. Tiwari
5	Surjit Kishor Das	1 November 2006	31 August 2008	1 year, 304 days	N. D. Tiwari
5	Surjit Kishor Das	1 November 2006	31 August 2008	1 year, 304 days	B. C. Khanduri
6	Indu Kumar Pandey	1 September 2008	30 November 2009	1 year, 90 days	B. C. Khanduri
6	Indu Kumar Pandey	1 September 2008	30 November 2009	1 year, 90 days	Ramesh Pokhriyal
7	Nrip Singh Napalchyal	1 December 2009	31 August 2010	273 days	Ramesh Pokhriyal
8	Subhash Kumar	1 September 2010	31 May 2012	1 year, 273 days	Ramesh Pokhriyal
8	Subhash Kumar	1 September 2010	31 May 2012	1 year, 273 days	B. C. Khanduri
8	Subhash Kumar	1 September 2010	31 May 2012	1 year, 273 days	Vijay Bahuguna
9	Alok Kumar Jain	1 June 2012	30 April 2013	333 days	Vijay Bahuguna
(8)	Subhash Kumar	1 May 2013	30 September 2014	1 year, 152 days	Vijay Bahuguna
(8)	Subhash Kumar	1 May 2013	30 September 2014	1 year, 152 days	Harish Rawat
10	N. Ravishankar	1 October 2014	31 July 2015	303 days	Harish Rawat
11	Rakesh Sharma	1 August 2015	31 October 2015	91 days	Harish Rawat
12	Shatrughna Singh	1 November 2015	30 November 2016	1 year, 29 days	Harish Rawat
13	S. Ramaswamy	1 December 2016	24 October 2017	327 days	Harish Rawat
13	S. Ramaswamy	1 December 2016	24 October 2017	327 days	Trivendra Singh Rawat
14	Utpal Kumar Singh	25 October 2017	31 July 2020	2 years, 280 days	Trivendra Singh Rawat
15	Om Prakash Singh	1 August 2020	6 July 2021	339 days	Trivendra Singh Rawat
15	Om Prakash Singh	1 August 2020	6 July 2021	339 days	Tirath Singh Rawat
16	Sukhbir Singh Sandhu	7 July 2021	31 January 2024	2 years, 208 days	Pushkar Singh Dhami
17	Radha Raturi	1 February 2024	31 March 2025	1 year, 58 days	Pushkar Singh Dhami
18	Anand Bardhan	1 April 2025	Incumbent	1 year, 218 days	Pushkar Singh Dhami

== See also ==
- Governor of Uttarakhand
- Chief Minister of Uttarakhand
- Cabinet of Uttarakhand
- List of Uttarakhand ministries
- List of agencies of the government of Uttarakhand
- List of departments of the government of Uttarakhand
- Chief Justice of Uttarakhand
- List of judges of the Uttarakhand High Court
- Speaker of the Uttarakhand Legislative Assembly
- Leader of the Opposition in the Uttarakhand Legislative Assembly
- Uttarakhand Public Service Commission
- Provincial Civil Service (Uttarakhand)
- Vinod Prasad Raturi
