= K. K. Mathew =

Indian judge (1911-1992)

Hon'ble Justice Kuttyil Kurien Mathew

Chairman, 10th Law Commssion of India
- In office 1981–1985
- Appointed by: Neelam Sanjiva Reddy
- Prime Minister: Indira Gandhi
- Preceded by: P. V. Dixit (9th)
- Succeeded by: Dhirjlal Ambelal Desai (11th)

Judge of Supreme Court of India
- In office 4 October 1971 – 2 January 1976
- Nominated by: Sarv Mittra Sikri
- Appointed by: V. V. Giri

Judge of Kerala High Court
- In office 5 June 1962 – 3 October 1971
- Nominated by: B. P. Sinha
- Appointed by: S. Radhakrishnan

Advocate General of Kerala
- In office 1 November 1960 – 4 June 1962
- Appointed by: V. V. Giri
- Chief Minister: Pattom A. Thanu Pillai
- Preceded by: K. V. Suryanarayana Iyer
- Succeeded by: V. P. Gopalan Nambiyar

Personal details
- Born: 3 January 1911 Athirampuzha, Kerala, India
- Died: 2 May 1992 (aged 81)
- Children: K. M. Joseph (son)
- Education: Government Law College, Thiruvananthapuram (LL.B)

Kuttyil Kurien Mathew (3 January 1911 – 2 May 1992) was a judge of the Supreme Court of India highly regarded for his scholarship and for his seminal contribution to the constitutional and administrative law in India. He later served as the Tenth Law Commission Chairman and also as the Chairman of the Second Press Commission.

== Early life ==
Mathew was born on 3 January 1911 at Athirampuzha, Kerala. He hailed from Kuttiyil family of Athirampuzha in Kottayam district, Kerala. He completed his LL.B from Government Law College, Thiruvananthapuram.

== Career ==
He joined bar at Kottayam in 1935 and after some years moved to Trivandrum, seat of the high court of erstwhile Travancore state. He was a junior to A. J. John, who went on to serve as chief minister of Travancore–Cochin and governor of Madras State. In 1956 he shifted his practice to newly established High Court of Kerala and went on to become the advocate general of Kerala from 1 November 1960 to 4 June 1962.

He was appointed as Judge in the Kerala High Court on 5 June 1962 and served in such capacity till his appointment as Judge of Supreme Court of India on 4 October 1971. He was a member of the 13 judge bench hearing Kesavananda Bharati v. State of Kerala case and delivered minority opinion. He retired from Supreme Court on 2 January 1976.

His son Kuttyil Mathew Joseph also served as a judge of the Kerala Court from 2004 to 2014. In August 2018, while serving as the ninth Chief Justice of the Uttarakhand High Court, Justice Joseph was recommended as a Supreme Court judge and served as such from 2018 to 2023

== Post retirement ==
He was appointed as the Chairman of the 10th Law Commission of India in 1981 and served till 1985. He also headed second Press Commission and Lalit Narayan Mishra Enquiry Commission. He passed away on 2 May 1992.
