= Vivek Bharti Sharma =

Indian judge

Justice Vivek Bharti Sharma

Personal details
- Born: 13 June 1963 (age 63) Delhi, India
- Education: B.Sc., LL.B., Course in Forensic Science
- Alma mater: University of Delhi
- Occupation: Judge
- Known for: Judge of Uttarakhand High Court

Justice Vivek Bharti Sharma (born 13 June 1963) is a retired Indian judge who served on the bench of the Uttarakhand High Court. Post retirement he was appointed as chairperson of Debt Recovery Appellate Tribunal Mumbai in

== Early life and education ==
Justice Sharma completed his schooling at Ramjas School in Delhi. He earned a Bachelor of Science (B.Sc.) degree from the University of Delhi, followed by a Bachelor of Laws (LL.B.) from the Faculty of Law, University of Delhi. Additionally, he completed a course in Forensic Science from the Department of Anthropology at the University of Delhi.

== Legal career ==
Justice Sharma began his legal practice in 1987, focusing on matrimonial, civil, and criminal cases in the district courts and the High Court of Delhi. In 1990, he was appointed as Government Counsel for the Delhi Administration. By 1994, he became the Additional Public Counsel for the Government of Delhi, handling cases for various departments, including the Directorate of Industries, Directorate of Education, Public Works Department, and Delhi Police. In 1998, he was appointed as an advocate for Indian Railways in the High Court of Delhi. Two years later, in 2000, he took on the role of Additional Standing Counsel for the Union of India.

== Judicial career ==
In 2005, Justice Sharma joined the Higher Judicial Service (HJS) of Uttarakhand as part of its inaugural batch. He served as an Additional District and Sessions Judge in Haridwar, Roorkee, Haldwani, and Nainital. In May 2011, he was promoted to Principal District Judge in Pithoragarh and later held the same position in Pauri in 2013. His career also includes roles such as Legal Advisor to the Governor of Uttarakhand, Chairman of the Commercial Tax Tribunal in Dehradun, Director of the Uttarakhand Judicial and Legal Academy, Principal District Judge in Haridwar, and Registrar General of the High Court of Uttarakhand in Nainital.

== Appointment ==
Justice Sharma was appointed as a Judge of the High Court of Uttarakhand, took his oath as a Permanent Judge on 28 April 2023, and served till 12 June 2025.
