= T. Meena Kumari =

Former Chief Justice of Meghalaya High Court

Hon'ble Chief Justice (Retd.) Toom Meena Kumari

1st Chief Justice of Meghalaya High Court
- In office 23 March 2013 – 3 August 2013
- Nominated by: Altamas Kabir
- Appointed by: Pranab Mukherjee
- Preceded by: Position established
- Succeeded by: Prafulla Chandra Pant; T. Nanda Kumar Singh (acting)

Judge of Patna High Court
- In office 27 October 2010 – 22 March 2013
- Nominated by: S. H. Kapadia
- Appointed by: Pratibha Patil

Judge of Andhra Pradesh High Court
- In office 5 September 2001 – 26 October 2010
- Nominated by: A. S. Anand
- Appointed by: K. R. Narayanan
- In office 23 February 1998 – 22 March 1998
- Nominated by: M. M. Punchhi
- Appointed by: K. R. Narayanan

Judge of Madras High Court
- In office 23 March 1998 – 4 September 2001
- Nominated by: M. M. Punchhi
- Appointed by: K. R. Narayanan

Personal details
- Born: 3 August 1951 (age 75) Yalamanchili, Visakhapatnam district, Andhra Pradesh
- Education: Osmania University

Toom Meena Kumari (born 3 August 1951) is a retired high court judge of India. She was the first Chief Justice of Meghalaya High Court. She previously served as a judge of Andhra Pradesh High Court, Madras High Court and Patna High Court.

== Early life and career ==
Justice T. Meena Kumari was born on 3 August 1951. Late Shri Janapareddy Ramakrishna Rao Naidu and late Smt. J. Rajamani were her parents. She hailed from Yalamanchili, Visakhapatnam. She is the granddaughter of late violinist Padmashree Venkateswamy Naidu. After B.Sc. she completed her law degree from Osmania University, Hyderabad, Andhra Pradesh.

She enrolled as an Advocate in Bar Council of Andhra Pradesh and started practicing as an Advocate in High Court of Andhra Pradesh since 7 October 1976. She worked as a Junior to Shri P. Shiv Shanker, Senior Advocate and former Judge of High Court of Andhra Pradesh, who is her brother-in-law. Her husband Shri Toom Bheemsen is also a practicing Advocate.

She was elevated as Additional Judge of High Court of Andhra Pradesh and was sworn in on 23 February 1998. She was transferred to Madras High Court and has taken charge on 23 March 1998. She became permanent Judge on 17 June 1999. She was repatriated to Andhra Pradesh High Court on 5 September 2001. She was appointed as Acting Chief Justice of Andhra Pradesh High Court from 11 February 2010 to 18 February 2010. Whilst serving as a judge in the Andhra Pradesh High Court, she was involved in the case of T. Muralidhar Rao vs State of Andhra Pradesh 2010 as a member of the seven-judge bench. The case dealt with religion-based reservations, specifically relating to reservations for backward class Muslims. While agreeing with the majority view, which struck down the quota, Justice T. Meena Kumari articulated a separate judgement. She was again transferred to Patna High Court and took oath as a Judge of this court on 27 October 2010.

She was appointed as first chief justice of the newly created High Court of Meghalaya. On her appointment as the first Chief Justice of Meghalaya in 2013, she said her first priority would be to set up Fast-Track Courts in the state, as well as to understand the problems of the region and deal with pending cases. However, she was only in the post for five months.

After her retirement as Meghalaya Chief Justice in August 2013, she was appointed Chairperson of the Tamil Nadu State Human Rights Commission in December 2014. The post had been vacant since 2011.
