= Rakesh Sharma (civil servant) =

Rakesh Sharma Politician, Social Worker, Former IAS Officer
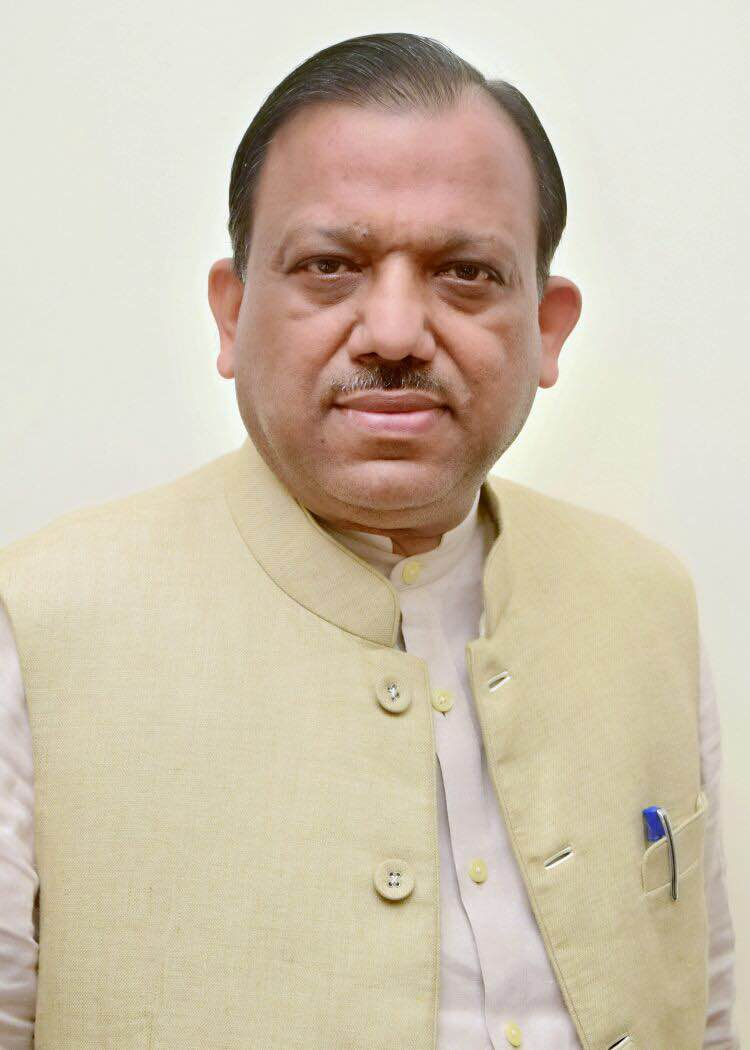
- Born: 11 October 1955 (age 69); New Delhi

Rakesh Sharma (11 October 1955) is a retired Indian civil servant and politician who has served as Chief Secretary of Government of Uttarakhand. Sharma is a 1982 batch Uttar Pradesh/Uttarakhand (Since 2001) cadre Indian Administrative Service officer.

== Early life and education ==
Sharma was born on 11 October 1955 in New Delhi. He did his schooling in New Delhi and passed the CBSE examinations in 1972 as a topper in the Humanities Group. He did his graduation in BA (honours) in economics at Shri Ram College of Commerce (SRCC) which is affiliated with Delhi University in 1975. He received academic prizes for all the three years. He completed his Master of Arts in economics from Delhi School of Economics in 1977. Later, after working a s a lecturer at SRCC, he received a Master of Science degree from London School of Economics in economics of Less Developed Countries and Labour Economics in 1996,

== Career ==
Sharma joined the Indian Railways in 1980 and join the Indian Administrative Service in 1981. He commenced his training at Lal Bahadur Shastri National Academy Of Administration in Mussoorie from 1981 to 1983.

In 1983, he was posted as the SDM at Saharanpur, Rorkee and served for two years before becoming the Chief Development Officer at Agra from 1985 to 1987. Later, he worked as the General Manager, UP Export Corporation, Kanpur till 1990, District Magistrate and collector of Saharanpur till 1991, and DM at Pithoragarh till 1993. Then he served as an Additional Chief Executive, Noida from 1993 to 1995.

He took leave and completed his MSc at the London School of Economics in 1996. He came back and worked as Additional Director, UP Academy of Administration, Nainital; Vice Chairman, Center for Development Studies UPAA, Nainital till 2000.

In 2000, he became the Secretary, Home, Personnel, Estates and was involved in setting up of infrastructure of newly carved out state at Dehradun till 2001. Later, he became Commissioner, Kumaon and Director, Uttarakhand Academy of Administration and chairman, Centre for Development Studies (UAA), Nainital for seven years till 2007. He was also the chairman of the Lake development authority, Nainital during that stint. Later, for two years till 2009, he served as Secretary, Sport & Youth Welfare in Dehradun for Government Of Uttarakhand. From 2009 to 2011, he was the Secretary, Tourism and Culture, Sports and Youth Welfare, before becoming the Principal Secretary for Technical Education in 2011. He served for two years before becoming the Chief Secretary of Uttarakhand in 2013. He was also the Chief Resident Commissioner and Chief Investment Commissioner till 2016. He also served as chairman, Board of Revenue, Uttarakhand, also in Dehradun.

In October 2018, government appointed him as the managing director (MD) and chief executive officer (CEO) of IDBI Bank for six months. In November 2015, he was appointed on contract for a year as the chief principal secretary to the chief minister.

After retirement, he reportedly tried his hand at politics. There was speculation that he would join the BJP and contest from Kichha Assembly constituency for the 2017 Uttarakhand Legislative Assembly election but the BJP field Rajesh Shukla, who won the seat.
