= Vipin Sanghi =

12th Chief Justice of Uttarakhand High Court

Hon'ble Chief Justice (Retd.) Vipin Sanghi
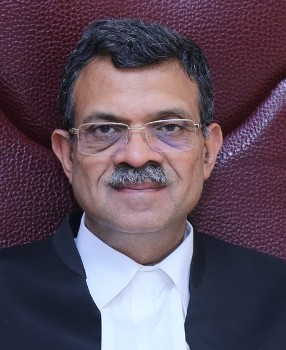

12th Chief Justice of Uttarakhand High Court
- In office 28 June 2022 – 26 October 2023
- Nominated by: N. V. Ramana
- Appointed by: Ram Nath Kovind
- Preceded by: R. S. Chauhan; S. K. Mishra (acting)
- Succeeded by: Ritu Bahri; M. K. Tiwari (acting)

Judge of Delhi High Court
- In office 29 May 2006 – 27 June 2022
- Nominated by: Y. K. Sabharwal
- Appointed by: A. P. J. Abdul Kalam
- Acting Chief Justice
- In office 13 March 2022 – 27 June 2022
- Appointed by: Ram Nath Kovind
- Preceded by: D. N. Patel
- Succeeded by: S. C. Sharma

Personal details
- Born: 27 October 1961 (age 65) Nagpur, Maharashtra
- Relations: V. K. Sanghi (grandfather)
- Parent: G. L. Sanghi
- Education: Delhi University (B.Sc.) Faculty of Law, University of Delhi (LL.B)

Vipin Sanghi (born 27 October 1961) is a retired Indian judge who served as the 12th Chief Justice of Uttarakhand High Court from June 2022 to October 2023. He also served as judge and as Acting Chief Justice of Delhi High Court.

== Family and education ==
Sanghi was born on 27 October 1961 in Nagpur, Maharashtra. His family shifted to Delhi in 1965. His grandfather, V. K. Sanghi, was an advocate, and his father, G. L. Sanghi, was a Senior Advocate. He completed his schooling at Delhi Public School, Mathura Road, in 1980 and graduation with B.Sc. (Honours) in Mathematics from the University of Delhi in 1983. He did his LL.B. from Faculty of Law, University of Delhi in 1986.

== Career ==
Sanghi enrolled as advocate with Bar Council of Delhi in 1986. He started practise under Senior Advocate Mukul Rohatgi. His practice focused primarily on civil and constitutional law before the Delhi High Court and the Supreme Court of India. He also served as a Central Government panel advocate and as counsel for the M. C. Jain Commission of Enquiry. In December 2005, he was designated a Senior Advocate by the Delhi High Court.

He was appointed an Additional Judge of the Delhi High Court on 29 May 2006, along with other notable judges like S. Muralidhar, Former Chief Justice of Orissa High Court and Hima Kohli, Former judge of the Supreme Court of India. He became permanent judge on 11 February 2008. On 13 March 2022, he assumed charge as Acting Chief Justice of the Delhi High Court following retirement of Chief Justice Dhirubhai Naranbhai Patel.

In May 2022, Supreme Court collegium recommended his appointment as Chief Justice of Uttarakhand High Court. Government cleared his appointment in June 2022 and he assumed office on 28 June 2022. He retired as Uttarakhand's Chief Justice on 26 October 2023.
