= Uttarakhand Lokayukta =

Parliamentary Ombudsman for the state of Sikkim

Agency overview
- Formed: 2012

Jurisdictional structure
- Federal agency: India
- Operations jurisdiction: India
- General nature: Federal law enforcement

Operational structure
- Headquarters: Uttarakhand Lokayukta, Dehradun
- Agency executive: Justice A P Subba, Lokayukta Chairperson.

Uttarakhand Lokayukta is the Parliamentary Ombudsman for the state of Uttarakhand in India. It is a high level statutory functionary, created to address grievances of the public against ministers, legislators, administration and public servants of the state, in issues related to misuse of power, mal-administration and corruption. It was first formed under the Uttarakhand Lokayukta Act, 2014 and approved by the Governor of Uttarakhand. With The Lokpal and Lokayuktas Act, 2013 adopted by the Parliament of India coming into force on 16 January 2014, each state in India was required to appoint its Lokayukta within a year. An Upa-Lokayukta is a deputy to the Lokayukta and assists in her or his work and acts as the in-charge Lokayukta in case the position falls vacant prematurely.

== Powers ==
Uttarakhand Lokayukta has complete and exclusive authority for enquiring into allegations or complaints against the Chief Minister of Uttarakhand, Deputy Chief Minister of Uttarakhand, Uttarakhand ministers, Uttarakhand Leader of the Opposition and Uttarakhand government officials. Lokayukta Act of the state which serves as its tool against corruption covers Chief Ministers, ex-Chief Ministers, State government officials, State ministers, IAS officers and, all public servants. Uttarakhand Lokayukta has powers to enquire into corruption allegations and related matters against State government officials, State public servants and elected officials in the state government.

== List of Uttarakhand Lokayuktas ==
S. No.	Name	Portrait	Tenure	Appointed by (Governor)	Ref.
1	S. H. A. Raza		2002–2008	Surjit Singh Barnala	
2	M. M. Ghildiyal		2008–2013	Banwari Lal Joshi	

== See also ==
- Lokayukta
- Lokpal
- The Lokpal and Lokayuktas Act, 2013
- Uttarakhand Lok Adalat
- Uttarakhand High Court
- Chief Justice of Uttarakhand
