= K. M. Joseph =

Indian judge (born 1958)

Hon'ble Justice (Retd.) Kuttiyil Mathew Joseph
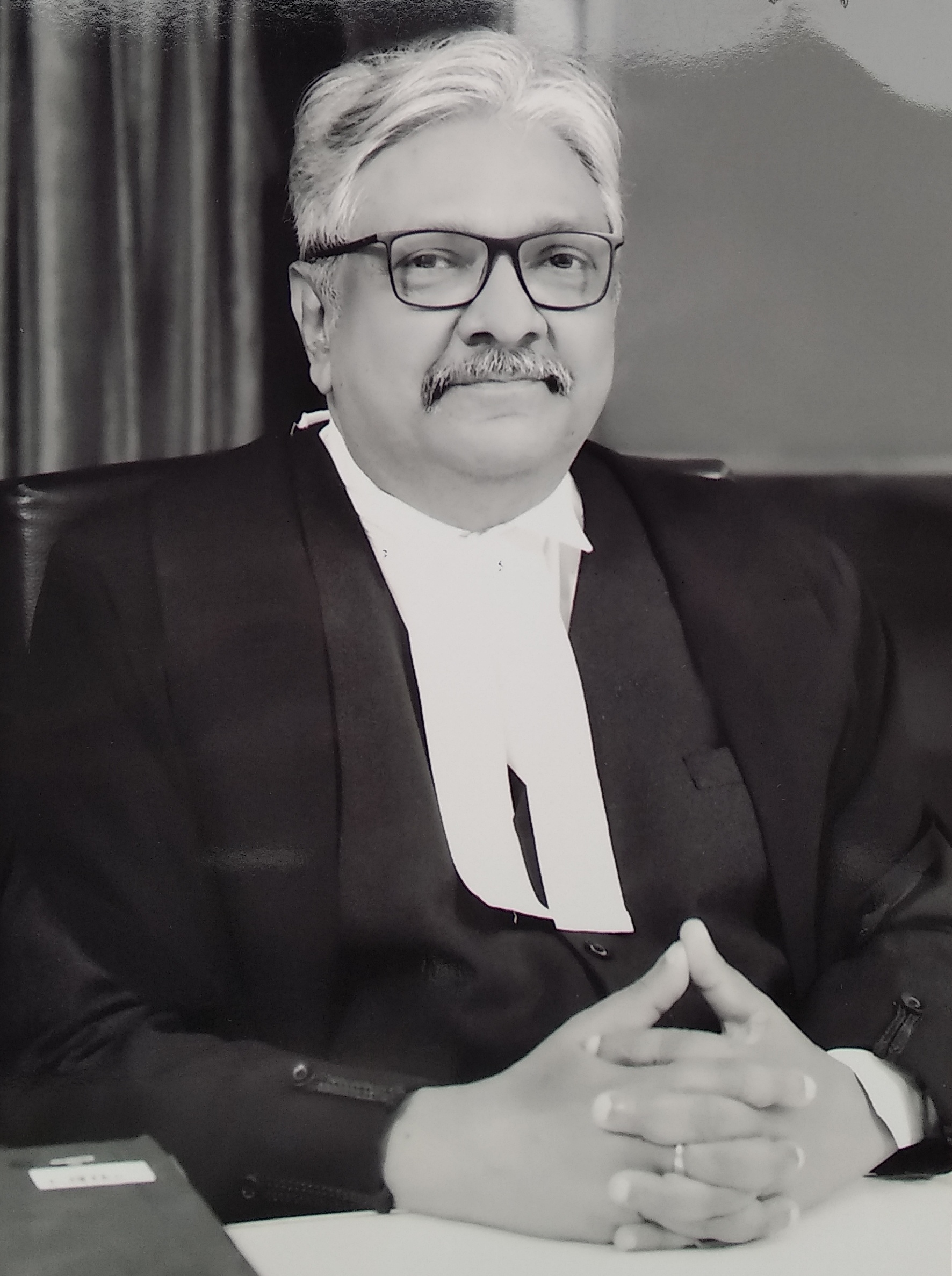
- Official portrait

Judge of Supreme Court of India
- In office 7 August 2018 – 16 June 2023
- Nominated by: Dipak Misra
- Appointed by: Ram Nath Kovind

9th Chief Justice of Uttarakhand High Court
- In office 31 July 2014 – 6 August 2018
- Nominated by: R. M. Lodha
- Appointed by: Pranab Mukherjee
- Preceded by: Barin Ghosh; V. K. Bist (acting)
- Succeeded by: R. Ranganathan; Rajeev Sharma (acting)

Judge of Kerala High Court
- In office 14 October 2004 – 30 July 2014
- Nominated by: R. C. Lahoti
- Appointed by: A. P. J. Abdul Kalam

Personal details
- Born: 17 June 1958 (age 68) Athirampuzha, Kerala, India
- Parent: K. K. Mathew (father)
- Education: Loyola College, Chennai; Government Law College, Ernakulam

Kuttiyil Mathew Joseph (born 17 June 1958) is a former judge of the Supreme Court of India; he retired on 16 June 2023. He is a former chief justice of the Uttarakhand High Court, previously serving as a judge of the Kerala High Court for more than nine years.

== Early life and education ==
Joseph was born in Kottayam, Kerala, India on 17 June 1958 to K. K. Mathew and Ammini Tharakan. His father, K. K. Mathew, was a judge of the Supreme Court of India, and chairman of the tenth Law Commission. He completed his secondary education from Kendriya Vidyalaya, Kochi and New Delhi. Later he joined Loyola College, Chennai, and Government Law College, Ernakulam for graduation and further studies.

== Career ==
=== As lawyer ===
Joseph enrolled as an advocate on 12 January 1982 and started practising in the Delhi High Court. Later he shifted his practice to the High Court of Kerala, Ernakulam in 1983. In 1986, he started independent practice and specialised in civil, constitutional and writ matters. He served as amicus curiae for a case that decided whether a Christian father under an obligation to maintain his minor child just before being elevated to the High Court Bench.

=== As judge ===
He was appointed the permanent judge of the Kerala High Court on 14 October 2004. On 18 July 2014, the president of India appointed Joseph as the next chief justice of Uttarakhand, on the recommendation of then CJI Rajendra Mal Lodha. On 31 July 2014, he was sworn in as the 9th chief justice of the Uttarakhand High Court at Nainital.

A bench headed by Justice Joseph had quashed the imposition of President's Rule in 2016 by the Narendra Modi led BJP government in the state of Uttarakhand. While being a judge at the Kerala HC, a bench that included Joseph ordered the demolition of Kapico resorts constructed illegally on Nediathuruthu Island in Alappuzha district.

In February 2017, Judge Jasti Chelameswar, a judge of the Supreme Court of India Collegium, recorded a strongly worded dissent note for not elevating K. M. Joseph to the Supreme Court of India. "Justice Joseph is an outstanding judge with impeccable integrity and the most suitable judge for elevation to the Supreme Court", Chelameswar wrote. "By not elevating a highly competent judge like Justice Joseph, the collegium was setting an unhealthy precedent", he added in the note.

==== Controversy on elevation to Supreme Court ====
According to media reports, on 11 January 2018, the Supreme Court Collegium had recommended the name of Joseph for their appointment as a judge of the Supreme Court. While recommending Joseph's name for elevation to the Supreme Court, the five member collegium unanimously said that "The Collegium considered that at the time of recommendation, Mr. Justice K. M. Joseph, who hails from Kerala High Court and was functioning as Chief Justice of Uttarakhand High Court, is more deserving and suitable in all respects than other Chief Justices and senior puisne Judges of High Courts for being appointed as Judges of the Supreme Court of India". Despite the strongly worded recommendation of the collegium, there still existed some suspense on its acceptance by the NDA government. There were media reports speculating that the government had returned the files recommending to elevate Joseph to the Supreme Court. This was later dismissed by unidentified sources from the law ministry.

On 26 April 2018, the government, in a letter to the then Chief Justice, Dipak Misra, stated that the proposed appointment of K.M. Joseph as a judge of the Supreme Court at that stage did not appear to be appropriate. In the letter, the Minister of Law and Justice, Ravi Shankar Prasad said that Justice K.M. Joseph was then placed at number 42 in the All India High Court Judges’ Seniority list and that there were, at that time, 11 Chief Justices of various High Courts who were senior to him. If his name were returned, the collegium could reiterate his name which would make it incumbent upon the government to issue a warrant for his appointment to the Supreme Court.

On the same day of the government's refusal to appoint Joseph as a judge of the Supreme Court, the Supreme Court Bar Association moved a petition signed by 100 lawyers seeking a stay on the warrant appointing Indu Malhotra as a Supreme Court judge, as mentioned by senior lawyer Indira Jaising while speaking in front of the chief justice. She said that the petition was not against Smt. Indu Malhotra, but was against the government, which was not clearing the name of Joseph, for segregating the collegium's recommendation. CJI Dipak Misra sternly rebuked lawyers while the Supreme Court not only refused to stay Malhotra's appointment, but also termed the petition as unimaginable, unthinkable, inconceivable and never heard of. The government's extraordinary step provoked outrage among opposition parties and questions from the legal fraternity, but the Chief Justice said: "If the centre has segregated the recommendation and sent one of the names for reconsideration, then they are within their rights."

===== Reiteration of collegium recommendation =====
On 16 July 2018, Supreme Court Collegium headed by CJI Dipak Misra reiterated the name of K. M. Joseph for elevation to the Apex Court. The resolution by the collegium read that after careful consideration, the collegium did not find anything adverse regarding the suitability of Joseph J. in the letters from the Law Minister. In a separate resolution, the Supreme Court Collegium recommended the names of Justice Indira Banerjee & Justice Vineet Saran, the CJs of Madras & Odisha High Courts, respectively.
