= Ritu Bahri =

Former Chief Justice of Uttarakhand High Court

Hon'ble Chief Justice (Retd.) Ritu Bahri

Chief Justice of Uttarakhand High Court
- In office 4 February 2024 – 10 October 2024
- Nominated by: Dhananjaya Y. Chandrachud
- Appointed by: Droupadi Murmu
- Preceded by: Vipin Sanghi
- Succeeded by: Guhanathan Narendar

Acting Chief Justice of Punjab and Haryana High Court
- In office 14 October 2023 – 3 February 2024
- Appointed by: Droupadi Murmu
- Preceded by: Ravi Shankar Jha
- Succeeded by: Gurmeet Singh Sandhawalia

Judge of Punjab and Haryana High Court
- In office 16 August 2010 – 13 October 2023
- Nominated by: S. H. Kapadia
- Appointed by: Pratibha Patil

Personal details
- Born: 11 October 1962 (age 64) Jalandhar
- Education: Punjab University

Ritu Bahri (born 11 October 1962) is an Indian jurist. She served as the Chief Justice of Uttarakhand High Court. She became the first woman Chief Justice of the Uttarakhand High Court. She also served as a former Acting Chief Justice of Punjab and Haryana High Court.
