= Guhanathan Narendar =

Former Chief Justice of Uttarakhand High Court

Hon'ble Chief Justice (Retd.) Guhanathan Narendar

Chief Justice of Uttarakhand High Court
- In office 26 December 2024 – 9 January 2026
- Nominated by: Dhananjaya Y. Chandrachud.
- Appointed by: Droupadi Murmu
- Preceded by: Ritu Bahri; Manoj Kumar Tiwari (acting)
- Succeeded by: Manoj Kumar Gupta

Judge of Andhra Pradesh High Court
- In office 30 October 2023 – 25 December 2024
- Nominated by: Dhananjaya Y. Chandrachud
- Appointed by: Droupadi Murmu

Judge of Karnataka High Court
- In office 2 January 2015 – 29 October 2023
- Nominated by: H. L. Dattu
- Appointed by: Pranab Mukherjee

Personal details
- Born: 10 January 1964 (age 62)

Guhanathan Narendar (born 10 January 1964) is a retired Indian judge, who served as the Chief Justice of Uttarakhand High Court. He also formerly served as a judge of the high courts of Karnataka and Andhra Pradesh.
