= Prafulla Chandra Pant =

Indian judge (born 1952)

Hon'ble Justice Prafulla Chandra Pant
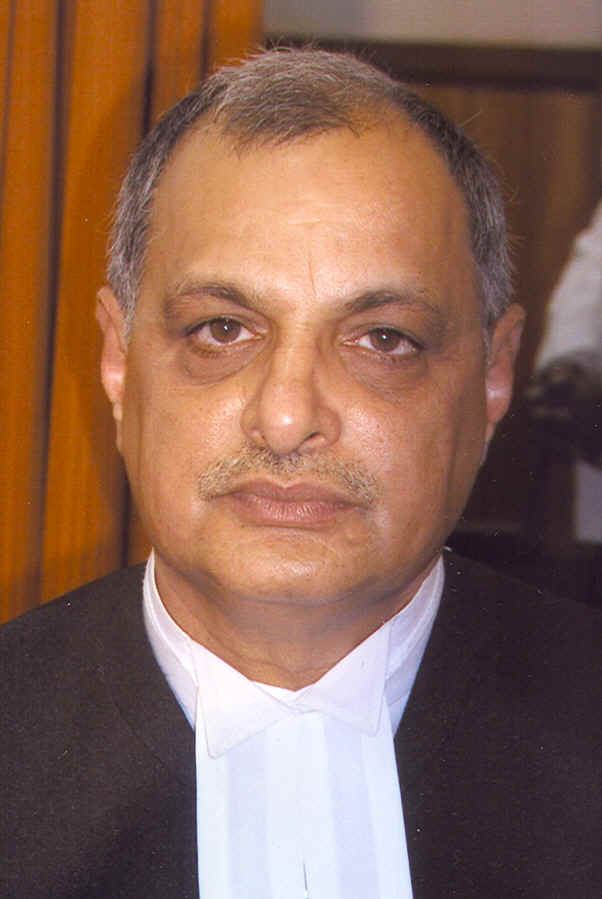
- Justice Pant (c. 2004)

Member of National Human Rights Commission of India
- In office 22 April 2019 – 11 September 2021
- Appointed by: Ram Nath Kovind
- Preceded by: Pinaki Chandra Ghose
- Succeeded by: Mahesh Mittal Kumar
- Acting Chairperson
- In office 25 April 2021 – 1 June 2021
- Appointed by: Ram Nath Kovind
- Preceded by: H. L. Dattu
- Succeeded by: Arun Kumar Mishra

Judge of Supreme Court of India
- In office 13 August 2014 – 29 August 2017
- Nominated by: R. M. Lodha
- Appointed by: Pranab Mukherjee

2nd Chief Justice of Meghalaya High Court
- In office 20 September 2013 – 12 August 2014
- Nominated by: P. Sathasivam
- Appointed by: Pranab Mukherjee
- Preceded by: T. Meena Kumari; T. Nanda Kumar Singh (acting)
- Succeeded by: Uma Nath Singh; T. Nanda Kumar Singh (acting)

Judge of Uttarakhand High Court
- In office 29 June 2004 – 19 September 2013
- Nominated by: R. C. Lahoti
- Appointed by: A. P. J. Abdul Kalam

Personal details
- Born: 30 August 1952 (age 74) Pithoragarh, Uttarakhand, India
- Spouse: Rashmi Pant (m. 1979)
- Children: 3
- Education: University of Allahabad (B.Sc); University of Lucknow(LL.B)
- Occupation: Judge; author
- Prafulla Chandra Pant's voice Justice Pant delivering the inaugural address on Human Rights Day Celebration at National Human Rights Commission of India; Recorded 10 December 2020 Other offices: 2003–2004: Registrar General of the Uttarakhand High Court; 2001-2003: District and Sessions Judge at Nainital; 2000-2001: Judicial Secretary of Uttarakhand

Prafulla Chandra Pant (born 30 August 1952) is a retired Indian judge and author who served as a judge of the Supreme Court of India from 2014 to 2017. He later served as a member of the National Human Rights Commission of India from 2019 to 2021, and briefly acted as its chairperson. Prior to his appointment as a judge of the Supreme Court of India, he had previously served as chief justice of the Meghalaya High Court at Shillong and as a judge of the Uttarakhand High Court at Nainital.

He was the first judge from the Uttarakhand to serve as a judge of Supreme Court of India. He was also the first judge from the Meghalaya High Court to be elevated to the Supreme Court of India, previously having served as its chief justice.

Pant has been instrumental in major cases, including decisions on execution of Yakub Memon, criminal appeals, defamation laws, religious conversions, and bank employees.

== Early life and education ==
Prafulla Chandra Pant was born on 30 August 1952 in Pithoragarh, Uttarakhand (then part of Uttar Pradesh state) to Ishwari Datt Pant and Pratima Pant. His father, I. D. Pant was a teacher who served as principal of Bapu Government Inter College in Pithoragarh. He got his primary and secondary education from Mirthi in Pithoragarh and senior secondary education from Government Inter College, Pithoragarh. He graduated from Allahabad University with a Bachelor of Science, followed by a Bachelor of Laws from the University of Lucknow in which he secured first division.

During his B.Sc. years, Pant wished to join the armed forces and took the written examination of National Defence Academy. He qualified for the interview round, which was conducted by the Services Selection Board, but ultimately was not selected. Despite this setback, Pant did not give up on his dream of serving in the military. While pursuing his LL.B., he took the Combined Defence Services exam and once again qualified the written examination. However, he was not able to clear the interview round.

== Career ==
=== Advocacy ===
Pant joined the bar at Allahabad in 1973 and began practicing in the Allahabad High Court. As a novice, he learnt advocacy from learned advocates Ramesh Chandra Srivastava in 1974 and Vishnu Dayal Singh in 1975 respectively. He practiced advocacy primarily to gain a clear insight of the legal profession, not to set up a career out of it. He aspired to clear Munsif Services Examination (now PCS J) and endeavoured to become a judge.

=== Excise Inspector ===
He took the UP Judicial Service Examination and before the declaration of its result also took the Excise Inspector exam and cleared it. He was posted at Sagar, Madhya Pradesh in the Central Excise and Customs department. He joined the office on 23 February 1976. On the same day, he tendered his resignation as Member of the Bar Council of Uttar Pradesh and ceased to practice. During his course of employment as Central Excise Inspector, he caught two consignments of illegal tobacco and apprehended the persons who were later found guilty. On 5 December 1976, he was informed by the Uttar Pradesh government of his appointment as a Munsiff (Civil Judge Junior Division) in the Uttar Pradesh Judicial Service and thereafter, he submitted his resignation letter to the Central Excise department to join the judicial service.

=== District judiciary ===
Pant entered into Uttar Pradesh Judicial Service in 1976 (through Uttar Pradesh Munsif Services Examination, 1973). He held different posts in judicial service at Ghaziabad, Pilibhit, Ranikhet, Bareilly and Meerut in Uttar Pradesh. He was later promoted to Uttar Pradesh Higher Judicial Service in 1990, and joined as an additional district judge of the Bahraich district. He also worked as joint registrar in the High Court of Allahabad.

After creation of the new state of Uttarakhand, he served as the first judicial secretary of the state. He also held the post of district and sessions judge at Nainital district before being posted as registrar general of the High Court of Uttarakhand at Nainital.

=== Uttarakhand High Court ===
He took the oath of office as an additional judge of the High Court of Uttarakhand on 29 June 2004, where after, he was confirmed on 19 February 2008, as a permanent judge of the Uttarakhand High Court.

=== Meghalaya High Court ===
Pant took the oath of office as chief justice of the Meghalaya High Court on 20 September 2013.

He served at Shillong for almost 11 months and left for New Delhi after he was informed of his elevation to the Supreme Court of India.

=== Supreme Court ===
On being further elevated he took oath of office as judge of the Supreme Court of India on 13 August 2014. After serving over 3 years as a judge of the Supreme Court of India, he retired from office on 29 August 2017.

=== National Human Rights Commission of India ===
He was appointed as Member 1 of the National Human Rights Commission of India in April 2019. He joined the office on 22 April 2019.

After retirement of the then Chairperson H. L. Dattu, he was appointed as the acting chairperson of the Commission on 25 April 2021 and continued as the acting chairperson till 1 June 2021. Pant, in March 2021 expressed "his concern" for the vacant positions in NHRC and State Commissions.

He resigned from his position with the commission on 11 September 2021.

== Notable judgements ==
Pant's judgements at the Supreme Court were predominantly on criminal matters which can be partly attributed to his extensive experience of criminal law as a trial court judge and his work at the Sessions Court. He is also acknowledged for his judgements on civil, labour and service matters.

=== Yakub Memon's appeal ===
In an unprecedented overnight hearing at 3:20 am IST on 30 July 2015, a three-judge bench composed of Dipak Misra, Pant and Amitava Roy, rejected 1993 Mumbai serial blasts convict Yakub Memon's appeal to stay his execution which resulted in his hanging at the Nagpur Central Jail a few hours later.

Memon's lawyers made a last-minute effort to save him from the noose by rushing to the residence of Chief Justice H. L. Dattu to petition for an urgent hearing, after Memon's mercy pleas were rejected by Governor of Maharashtra C. Vidyasagar Rao and then by President Pranab Mukherjee. However, the Supreme Court dismissed the petition and the three-judge bench refused to stay the execution, stating that Memon had been provided with sufficient opportunities before the courts and the executive. The bench further stated, "if we have to stay the death warrant it would be a travesty of justice", adding that "we do not find any merit in the writ petition".

=== Defamation and freedom of speech ===
In Subramanian Swamy v. Union of India, a two judge bench of the Supreme Court of India, which included Pant with Justice Dipak Misra, upheld the constitutional validity of defamation as a criminal offence. Many saw the verdict as a blow to freedom of speech and expression in India. Herein, the bench concluded that the Right to Reputation is included under Article 21 of the Indian Constitution. The court also referred to B. R. Ambedkar's speech to highlight the intention of the drafters to include reasonable restrictions on free speech and expression under Article 19(2), without defining words such as "defamation" and clearly left it for the wisdom of the courts to interpret and apply their meaning.

To determine the constitutionality of Section 499 of the Indian Penal Code and its exceptions, the bench examined each provision in detail and concluded that the section is not vague. The bench rejected the petitioner's argument about "public good", stating that such interpretation must be made on a case-by-case basis. Ultimately, the court found Section 499 of the Indian Penal Code and Section 199 of the CrPC constitutional, asserting that the judiciary is independent of political influence and that the judicial magistrates are responsible for preventing misuse of the judicial process.

=== Public duty of Private bank employees ===
A two-judge bench composed of Pant and Ranjan Gogoi at the Supreme Court of India presided over the case of CBI vs Ramesh Gelli, which centered around the question of whether officers of a private bank could be regarded as public servants under the Prevention of Corruption Act, 1988.

The accused individuals in the case were the chairman, managing director, and executive director of Global Trust Bank (GTB), who were alleged to have fraudulently sanctioned loans and diverted funds, resulting in a wrongful loss to the bank. The trial court and the High Court had ruled that the accused were not public servants, and hence, they could not be charged under the Prevention of Corruption Act (PCA). However, the bench held that the accused did fall under the definition of public servant as per Section 2(c)(viii) of the PCA. This provision defines public servant to include "any person who holds an office by virtue of which he is authorized or required to perform any public duty".

Pant, in his judgement also relied on Section 46A of the Banking Regulation Act, 1949, which defines officers of private banks as public servants for certain purposes. This provision states that any person who is an officer, director, or employee of a banking company is deemed to be a public servant under the Indian Penal Code and the Prevention of Corruption Act. However, Gogoi noted that the mere performance of public duties by a private office holder does not necessarily make them a public servant under the Prevention of Corruption Act. He, in his concurrent judgement stated that a wide interpretation of the definition of public servant could blur the line between private and public office holders.

Nonetheless, the judgement has had significant implications, as private bank owners and employees have increasingly faced arrests under the Prevention of Corruption Act. They are now held accountable for their "public duty", which has a notable impact on how the banking industry operates in India.

=== Religious conversion and scheduled caste status ===
In Mohammad Sadique vs Darbara Singh Guru, a bench of JJ Ranjan Gogoi and Pant, quashed the order of Punjab and Haryana High Court, and accepted the plea of Mohammad Sadique to be a member of a Scheduled Caste (SC) and upheld his membership of Punjab Legislative Assembly.

Guru in the Punjab Legislative Assembly elections of 2012 filed his nomination papers as a candidate of Shiromani Akali Dal whereas Sadique was a candidate from Indian National Congress. Both contested from the Bhadaur constituency of Punjab, which was reserved for Scheduled Castes. The outcome of the election was that Sadique won from Bhadaur and was elected Member of the Legislative Assembly. Guru challenged the outcome before the High Court of Punjab and Haryana pleading that Sadique professed Islam and so, could not be a member of the Scheduled Caste (SC), nor could he have contested from Bhadaur. The High Court delivered the verdict in Guru's favour, annulling his membership of State Legislature and held that he was a Muslim, not a member of Scheduled Caste. Aggrieved by the verdict, Sadique moved the Supreme Court.

At the Supreme Court, a bench of JJ Ranjan Gogoi and Pant, observed that Sadique, even before his conversion to Sikhism, had inclination towards it, was a ‘Ragi’ by caste and used to perform Kirtan at Alamgir Sikh Gurdwara. He even gave sufficient justification for why he did not change his name after his conversion to Sikhism, as he was already popular as a singer with that name. The bench noted, “A person can change his religion or faith but not the caste to which he belongs to, as caste has linkage to birth." The bench believed that Sadique had become a Sikh, was a member of the 'Doom' community and thus, was also a member of the Scheduled Caste and allowed Sadique to function as a Member of Punjab Legislative Assembly for his remaining term.

=== Compromise in rape ===
In State of MP vs Madanlal, a bench of JJ Dipak Misra and Pant held that there is no compromise legally permissible in rape cases between the accused and the victim, as rape is a non-compoundable offence and it’s an offence against society which cannot be left for the parties to compromise and settle.

In this case, a criminal appeal was filed by the State of Madhya Pradesh against an accused who was charged for raping a seven-year-old girl under Section 376(2)(f) of the Indian Penal Code (IPC). The trial court held the accused guilty and sentenced him to seven years of rigorous imprisonment. The accused filed an appeal in the Madhya Pradesh High Court, which interpreted the offence to be punishable under Section 354 of IPC and reduced the sentence to the period already undergone, as per the victim’s agreement for a marriage proposal. The State of Madhya Pradesh challenged the High Court's judgment in the Supreme Court.

The incident happened when the accused met the victim on her way, took her near the river Parvati and raped her. Upon hearing her scream, the victim's mother reached the spot, and the accused fled. The victim narrated the incidence of rape to her mother, and soon a criminal case was initiated when an FIR was filed by the Police. In the appeal, the accused argued that the trial court failed to appreciate the evidence properly, and the sentence of conviction deserves to be annulled. The High Court noted an alternative submission of the compromise and marriage proposal between the parties and held that the offence being non-compoundable, the sentence was reduced to the period already undergone.

At the Supreme Court, the State of Madhya Pradesh argued that the High Court's judgment promotes an idea of compromise between the rapist and the victim, and on the ground that rape is a non-compoundable offence against society. The Supreme Court held that rape being a non compoundable offence cannot be left for the parties to be compounded, stating that the High Court had not perused all the evidence before it and ordered a reappraisal of the evidence and a fresh decision. The Court also ordered the re-arrest of the accused by the concerned Superintendent of Police.

=== Gujarat shrine restoration ===
He was a part of bench with Chief Justice Dipak Misra, which held that destruction of places of worship by a dominant group is not a violation of Article 21 of the Indian Constitution, right to life.

In 2012, the Islamic Relief Committee of Gujarat had filed a PIL in the Gujarat High Court seeking compensation from the state government for the repair of religious sites that were damaged during the 2002 Godhra riots. The High Court had ordered the government to provide compensation. Nevertheless, the Gujarat government, then led by Narendra Modi appealed the decision in the Supreme Court claiming that it violated the Constitution by diverting funds, the taxes paid by citizens towards religious monuments. In response, the IRCG argued that the desecration of religious symbols during the riots violated the community's dignity and that compensating for it would not breach religious freedom. The Supreme Court, after careful consideration of the claims set aside the verdict of the High Court, asking the state government to provide compensation only in reasonable cases that followed certain conditions.

It found that compensation under Article 21 could only be granted for direct violations of bodily autonomy, and clarified that deviating tax proceeds towards the maintenance of religious structures violates Article 27 (Note: Article 27 of the Indian Constitution states, "No person shall be compelled to pay any taxes, the proceeds of which are specifically appropriated in payment of expenses for the promotion or maintenance of any particular religion or religious denomination.") of the Indian Constitution. The state government agreed to pay ex-gratia (Note: Ex gratia is a Latin legal maxim meaning "by favour" or "as a gift".) amounts for repair and reconstruction works of various structures, shops, and houses which were damaged during the riots.

=== Rights of lyricists and composers ===
In International Confederation of Societies of Authors and Composers (CISAC) vs. Aditya Pandey & Ors., a two-judge bench of the Supreme Court of India composed of Pant and Ranjan Gogoi reaffirmed the decision of the Division Bench of the Delhi High Court in the matter of IPRS v Aditya Pandey & Ors. The High Court had held that only the owner of the sound recording and not the owner of the lyrics or musical works incorporated into the sound recording, should receive royalties from entities such as radio stations that broadcast or communicate sound recordings.

This decision is believed to have dealt a significant blow to the rights of lyricists and composers, whose works were previously considered to be independent and separate from those of music producers. However, Pant in his judgement made it clear that lyricists and composers can still claim royalties for their work, although they will not have any say in the licensing or assignment of their works.

Overall, this judgment had significant implications for the music industry, particularly for lyricists and composers who received fewer royalties. It also highlighted the need for the efficient resolution of legal disputes to avoid long-drawn-out court battles that ultimately discourage the pursuit of justice.

== Notable dissents ==
=== Corruption and bail ===
In a 2:1 judgment dated 16 August 2017, Pant penned the dissenting opinion in Rakesh Kumar Paul vs State of Assam passed by the Supreme Court over a case of alleged corruption.

"In the present case, the allegations do not disclose merely an economic offence but it shows a transgression of the constitutional rights of the victims of the crime. The Chairman of the APSC has the responsibility on behalf of the State for enforcement of the Fundamental Rights of equality in matters of public employment enshrined under Articles 14 and 16 of the Constitution of India. If the allegations are found to be true, then the offence cannot merely be considered as an economic offence, but a fraud on the Constitution itself by the persons appointed to enforce it."

— Prafulla Chandra Pant

== Personal life ==
Pant and his wife, Rashmi Pant were married on 10 June 1979. They have three daughters: Surabhi, Tanushree and Noopur. His wife rarely appeared at social events and functions, however Pant has stated that, she had played her role silently in his career, supporting him.

== Works ==
Pant has written many books on different subjects of law, few of which include:

- Prafulla Chandra Pant. Marriage, Divorce and Other Matrimonial Disputes
- Prafulla Chandra Pant. Sundar Nirnay Kaise Likhen (in Hindi) (lit. How To Write Good Judgements)
- Prafulla Chandra Pant. Commentary on Code of Civil Procedure (in English), 1998. Published by Modern Law Publications, Prayagraj.
- Prafulla Chandra Pant. Commentary on Code of Civil Procedure (in Hindi), 1999. Published by Universal Law Publishers, Prayagraj.
- Prafulla Chandra Pant and T. P. Gopalakrishnan. The Hindu Adoptions and Maintenance Act, 1956. Law Book Co., 1994
- Prafulla Chandra Pant and Somnath Aggarwal. Commentary On the Law of Maintenance. Orient Publications New Delhi, 1995

His autobiography titled "Sangharsh Aur Bhagya" (in Hindi) was published in the year 2021.

He was given first prize by Department of Justice, Government of India for his Commentary on Code of Civil Procedure (in Hindi), 1999.

== Citations ==
Legal offices
Preceded by H. C. Tiwari	District and Sessions Judge at Nainital; 2001-2003	Succeeded by I. J. Malhotra
Preceded by J. C. S. Rawat	Registrar General of Uttarakhand High Court; 2003-2004	Succeeded by V. K. Maheshwari
Preceded by T. Meena Kumari	Chief Justice of Meghalaya High Court; 2013-2014	Succeeded by Uma Nath Singh
Government offices
Preceded by Pinaki Chandra Ghose	Member 1 of National Human Rights Commission of India; 2019-2021	Vacant
