= Ramjas School =

Ramjas School may refer to:

- Ramjas School, Pusa Road, New Delhi, India
- Ramjas School, R. K. Puram, New Delhi, India
- Ramjas College, constituent college of University of Delhi, India
