= Manoj Kumar Tiwari =

Indian judge (born 1965)

Hon'ble Justice Manoj Kumar Tiwari

Judge of Uttarakhand High Court
- Incumbent
- Assumed office 19 May 2017
- Nominated by: J. S. Khehar
- Appointed by: Pranab Mukherjee
- Acting Chief Justice
- Assumed office 9 October 2026
- Appointed by: Droupadi Murmu
- Preceded by: M. K. Gupta
- In office 11 October 2024 – 25 December 2024
- Appointed by: Droupadi Murmu
- Preceded by: Ritu Bahri
- Succeeded by: G. Narendar
- In office 27 October 2023 – 3 February 2024
- Appointed by: Droupadi Murmu
- Preceded by: Vipin Sanghi
- Succeeded by: Ritu Bahri

Personal details
- Born: 18 September 1965 (age 61) Pithoragarh, Uttarakhand
- Education: Delhi University (LL.B)

Manoj Kumar Tiwari (born 18 September 1965) is an Indian jurist, who is currently serving as judge and acting chief justice of the Uttarakhand High Court. He previously also served as the acting chief justice of that High Court from 11 October 2024 till 25 December 2024 and previously from 27 October 2023 till 3 February 2024.

== Background and education ==
Tiwari was born on 19 September 1965 at Pithoragarh in Uttarakhand. He comes from a family with a strong legal background. His father, N. B. Tiwari, is a designated Senior Advocate, while his maternal grandfather, Ram Datt Chilkoti, was a prominent lawyer in Pithoragarh. Tiwari pursued his graduation and post-graduation from Government Post Graduate College, Pithoragarh. He subsequently obtained his LL.B. from the University of Delhi in 1990. The same year, he enrolled with the Bar Council of Uttar Pradesh at Allahabad, and began practising at the Allahabad High Court.

With the creation of the Uttarakhand High Court in 2000, Tiwari shifted to Nainital and became associated with the newly established High Court. He developed a substantial practice and represented the State Government as Special Counsel in various cases. He was designated as a Senior Advocate on 20 May 2009. He also served as President of the High Court Bar Association, Nainital, in 2008.

== Career ==
He was elevated to the Bench as a Permanent Judge of the Uttarakhand High Court on 19 May 2017. He was appointed Acting Chief Justice for the first time from 27 October 2023 to 3 February 2024 and second time from 11 October 2024 to 25 December 2024.

He was appointed Executive Chairman of the Uttarakhand State Legal Services Authority from 24 February 2021 to 11 October 2021, and again from 22 February 2026.

In October 2026, following the retirement of Chief Justice Manoj Kumar Gupta, Tiwari was appointed Acting Chief Justice of the Uttarakhand High Court for the third time, with effect from 9 October 2026.
