= Rakesh Thapliyal =

Indian judge (born 1969)

Justice Rakesh Thapliyal

Personal details
- Born: 15 November 1969 (age 56) Tehri Garhwal, Uttarakhand, India
- Education: B.Sc., LL.B.
- Alma mater: Garhwal University, Allahabad University
- Occupation: Judge
- Known for: Judge of Uttarakhand High Court

Justice Rakesh Thapliyal (born 15 November 1969) is an Indian judge serving on the bench of the Uttarakhand High Court.

== Early life and education ==
Justice Rakesh Thapliyal was born on 15 November 1969 in Tehri Garhwal, Uttarakhand. He comes from a very poor family dedicated to education. His father, the late Shri Chandi Prasad Thapliyal, was an Assistant Teacher in Physical Education, while his mother, Smt. Kamla Devi, was the daughter of late Shri Janardhan Prasad Joshi, a practicing advocate in the District Court of Chamoli.

He completed his early education at Saraswati Shishu Mandir in Srinagar Garhwal and continued his high school and intermediate studies at Government Inter College. He earned his Bachelor of Science (B.Sc.) degree from Garhwal University and later pursued his Bachelor of Laws (LL.B.) from Allahabad University.

== Controversies ==
=== The "Muhammad Deepak" case (2026) ===
In February 2026, Justice Thapliyal presided over a highly publicized case involving Deepak Kumar (known popularly as "Muhammad Deepak"), a gym trainer from Kotdwar who faced an FIR after intervening to protect a Muslim shopkeeper from right-wing activists. Kumar had approached the Uttarakhand High Court seeking to quash the FIR against him, request police protection due to death threats, and initiate an inquiry into the local police.

Justice Thapliyal rejected Kumar's petitions, stating that the court could not interfere with an ongoing criminal investigation. The court characterized Kumar's legal demands as an "abuse of process" aimed at pressuring the law enforcement machinery. Furthermore, Justice Thapliyal issued a strict gag order restraining Kumar from posting any statements or updates regarding the incident on social media, noting that the petitioner was actively engaging online rather than cooperating with the police investigation.

The ruling drew significant media attention and public debate. Legal commentators and civil rights groups criticized the decision for denying police protection to a citizen facing public threats and for ordering an inquiry into voluntary public donations received by Kumar. Conversely, legal analysts noted that the bench's decision strictly adhered to standard judicial procedures regarding active police investigations and the prevention of public trial by media.
