= Hima Kohli =

Indian judge (born 1959)

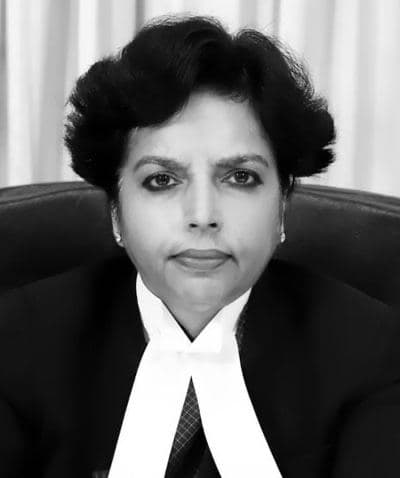

Judge of the Supreme Court of India
- In office 31 August 2021 – 1 September 2024
- Nominated by: N. V. Ramana
- Appointed by: Ram Nath Kovind

3rd Chief Justice of Telangana High Court
- In office 7 January 2021 – 30 August 2021
- Nominated by: Sharad Arvind Bobde
- Appointed by: Ram Nath Kovind
- Preceded by: Raghvendra Singh Chauhan
- Succeeded by: Satish Chandra Sharma; M. S. R. Rao (acting)

Judge of the Delhi High Court
- In office 29 May 2006 – 6 January 2021
- Nominated by: Yogesh Kumar Sabharwal
- Appointed by: A. P. J. Abdul Kalam

Personal details
- Born: 2 September 1959 (age 67) New Delhi
- Education: University of Delhi

Hima Kohli (born 2 September 1959) is a former judge of the Supreme Court of India from 2021 to 2024. Earlier, she served as a judge of the Delhi High Court and then the second chief justice of the Telangana High Court, being the first woman judge to hold that office.

== Early life and education ==
Kohli was born on 2 September 1959 in New Delhi. She did her schooling at St. Thomas' School. In 1979, she earned a Bachelor of Arts in history from St. Stephen's College, Delhi. She went on to earn a postgraduate degree in history from the University of Delhi, and a degree in law from the Campus Law Centre, University of Delhi.

== Career ==
Kohli enrolled with the Bar Council of Delhi in 1984. She practiced law in Delhi, acting as a counsel for the New Delhi Municipal Council between 1999 and 2004, as well as representing the Government of the National Capital Territory of Delhi. She was also appointed a legal advisor to several Delhi and central government bodies, including the Delhi Pollution Control committee, the National Agricultural Cooperative Marketing Federation of India, and the National Cooperative Development Corporation. She also provided legal aid services with the Delhi High Court Legal Services Committee.

On 29 May 2006, Kohli was appointed an additional judge on the Delhi High Court, and her appointment was made permanent on 29 August 2007. During her tenure on the Delhi High Court, she wrote several notable orders and judgments, including calling for inquiries into the detention of prisoners who had already been granted bail, protecting the identity of juveniles accused of crime, and the provision of facilities to enable visually-challenged people to study in government educational institutions.

In 2020, Kohli headed a judicial committee that monitored the Delhi Government's response to the COVID-19 pandemic in India. She rebuked the Central Government and the Indian Council for Medical Research (ICMR) for delaying approvals that would allow private laboratories to conduct testing in relation to the pandemic.

In 2021, Kohli was appointed the Chief Justice of the Telangana High Court, becoming the first woman to occupy that position since it was separated from the Andhra Pradesh High Court in 2019.

Kohli has also been involved with legal education and legal aid in India. From 2017, she has served on the general council of the West Bengal National University of Juridical Sciences, in Kolkata, and from 30 June 2020, she has served on the council for the National Law University, New Delhi. She became the chairperson of the Delhi State Legal Services Authority from 20 May 2020.

She was elevated as a judge of Supreme Court of India on 26 August 2021 and took oath on 31 August 2021. She retired on 1 September 2024. Over the course of her Supreme Court tenure, Kohli sat on 208 benches and authored 40 judgments. Kohli was a member of the benches that rejected a plea recognizing a right to marry for sexual minorities, upheld the powers of the National Capital Territory to control its administrative officers and civil servants, and held that celebrities could be liable for endorsing products through misleading information.

== See also ==
- Delhi High Court
- List of sitting judges of High Courts of India
