= Ramesh Ranganathan =

10th Chief Justice of Uttarakhand High Court

Hon'ble Retd. Chief Justice Ramesh Ranganathan
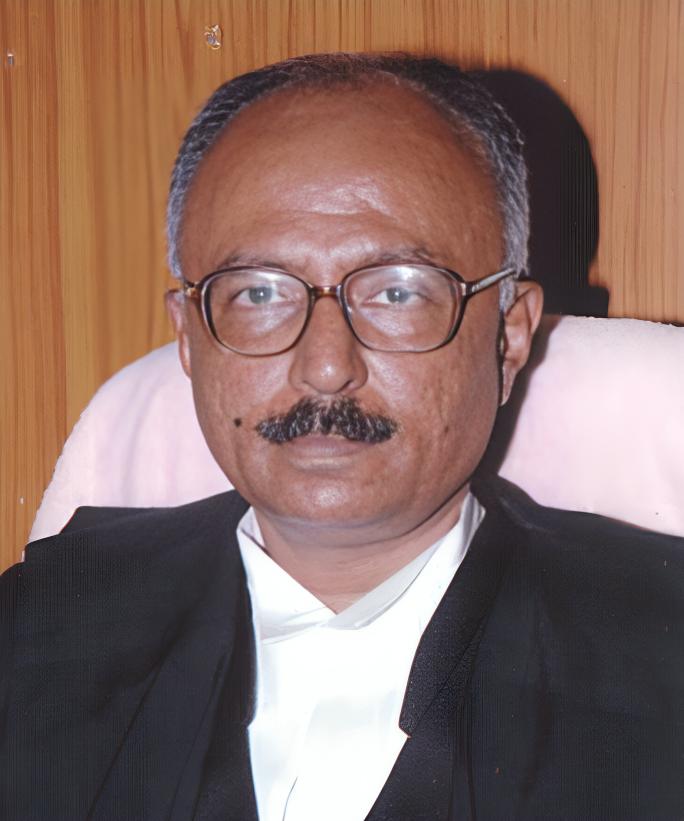
- Ranganathan in 2005

Chairman of Appellate Tribunal for Electricity
- In office 2 December 2022 – 27 February 2026
- Appointed by: Droupadi Murmu
- Preceded by: Manjula Chellur
- Succeeded by: Seema Gupta (acting)

10th Chief Justice of Uttarakhand High Court
- In office 2 November 2018 – 27 July 2020
- Nominated by: Ranjan Gogoi
- Appointed by: Ram Nath Kovind
- Preceded by: K. M. Joseph; Rajeev Sharma (acting)
- Succeeded by: R. S. Chauhan; Ravi Malimath (acting)

Judge of Andhra Pradesh High Court
- In office 26 May 2005 – 1 November 2018
- Nominated by: R. C. Lahoti
- Appointed by: A. P. J. Abdul Kalam

Acting Chief Justice of Hyderabad High Court
- In office 30 July 2016 – 6 July 2017
- Appointed by: Pranab Mukherjee
- Preceded by: K. J. Sengupta; D. B. Bhosale (acting)
- Succeeded by: T. B. Radhakrishnan

Personal details
- Born: 28 July 1958 (age 68) New Delhi, India
- Education: Bangalore University (LL.B)

Ramesh Ranganathan (born 28 July 1958) is a retired Indian judge and a former Chief Justice of the Uttarakhand High Court. He had earlier served as the Acting Chief Justice of Hyderabad High Court and judge of Andhra Pradesh High Court. Following his retirement from the High Court, he was appointed as the chairperson of the Indian Appellate Tribunal for Electricity where he served from the year 2022 till 2025.

== Life and career ==
Ranganathan was born on 28 July 1958 in New Delhi, he completed his B.Com and M.Com in 1977 and 1981 respectively and completed LL.B from Bangalore University. He launched his legal career with his enrolment as an advocate at the Andhra Pradesh High Court in November 1985. Over the next two decades, he established a distinguished track record in state legal service, working as a Government Pleader from 1996 to 2000 before escalating to the role of Additional Advocate General, which he held from July 2000 to May 2004. His judicial career formally began on 26 May 2005, when he was elevated to the bench as an additional judge of the Andhra Pradesh High Court, achieving permanent judge status in February of the following year. A decade later, on 30 July 2016, his seniority and leadership were called upon as he was appointed the Acting Chief Justice of the Hyderabad High Court. He successfully steered the institution in this interim capacity for two years, concluding his tenure when Justice T. B. Radhakrishnan took over as the permanent Chief Justice in July 2018.

He was appointed as Chief Justice of Uttarakhand High Court on 2 November 2018 and served as such till 27 July 2020.

== See also ==
- List of chief justices of the Uttarakhand High Court
- List of chief justices of India
