= Pankaj Purohit =

Indian judge (born 1968)

Justice Pankaj Purohit

Personal details
- Born: 28 July 1968 (age 57) Devalgarh, Tharali, Chamoli, Uttarakhand, India
- Education: LL.B.
- Alma mater: H.N.B. Garhwal University
- Occupation: Judge
- Known for: Judge of Uttarakhand High Court

Justice Pankaj Purohit (born 28 July 1968) is an Indian judge serving on the bench of the Uttarakhand High Court.

== Early life and education ==
Justice Purohit was born on 28 July 1968 in Village Dewalgwarh, Tharali, District Chamoli, Uttarakhand. He received his primary education in Lucknow and completed his LL.B. from Government P.G. College, Gopeshwar, under H.N.B. Garhwal University in 1991. Throughout his academic career, he secured top positions, achieving distinctions and ranking in merit lists during his High School and Intermediate examinations.

== Legal career ==
Enrolled as an advocate with the Bar Council of Uttar Pradesh on 24 February 1992, Justice Purohit began his practice under the guidance of his father, the late Prem Chandra Purohit, in the District and Sessions Court of Chamoli at Gopeshwar. He appeared in various lower judiciary courts, including revenue courts up to the level of Commissioner, Garhwal Division.

In 1997, he shifted his practice to the High Court of Judicature at Allahabad. Following the creation of the State of Uttarakhand on 9 November 2000, he returned to Uttarakhand and commenced practice at the High Court of Uttarakhand in Nainital. His practice encompassed constitutional, criminal, civil, service, and revenue matters. He represented several institutions, including United India Insurance Co. Ltd., Oriental Insurance Co. Ltd., Nagar Palika Parishad Chamoli, Zila Panchayat Chamoli, Uttarakhand Electricity Regulatory Commission, U.P. Avas Evam Vikas Parishad, and Uttarakhand Subordinate Service Selection Commission (UKSSSC).

In 2008-2009, he was appointed as a Central Government Counsel by the Union of India. On 29 May 2017, he was appointed as Deputy Advocate General for the State of Uttarakhand, a position from which he resigned on 19 July 2019 due to personal reasons.

== Judicial appointment ==
Justice Purohit was appointed as a Judge of the High Court of Uttarakhand via Notification No.K-13032/03/2022-US.I dated 27 April 2023. He took oath as a Permanent Judge of the Uttarakhand High Court on 28 April 2023.

== Personal life ==
Justice Purohit is married to Smt. Rameshwari Purohit, who serves as a government teacher.
