= Ashok Desai (judge) =

Indian judge (1942 - 2006)

Honourable Chief Justice Ashok Abhaiendra Desai

1st Chief Justice of Uttarakhand High Court
- In office 6 December 2000 – 31 March 2003; Acting CJ : 9 November 2000 - 5 December 2000
- Nominated by: A. S. Anand
- Appointed by: K. R. Narayanan
- Preceded by: Position established
- Succeeded by: S. H. Kapadia; Prakash Chandra Verma (acting)

Judge of the Allahabad High Court
- In office 8 March 1999 – 8 November 2000
- Nominated by: A. S. Anand
- Appointed by: K. R. Narayanan

Judge of the Bombay High Court
- In office 21 November 1986 – 7 March 1999
- Nominated by: P. N. Bhagwati
- Appointed by: Zail Singh

Personal details
- Born: 24 June 1942 Nagpur, Maharashtra, India
- Died: 9 February 2006 (aged 63)
- Children: Satyajit A. Deasi, Abhijeet A. Desai
- Education: Nagpur University

Ashok Abhaiendra Desai (24 June 1942 – 9 February 2006) was a former judge of the Bombay High Court and the Allahabad High Court. He also served as the first chief justice of the Uttarakhand High Court between 2000 and 2003.

== Career ==
Desai was born on 24 June 1942. He completed his law degree from Nagpur University in 1969 and in the very same year, he started practice as an advocate in December, 1969 before the Nagpur Bench of the Bombay High Court. He handled civil, criminal and constitutional matters and had experience in both Original Side and Appellate Side work. He was appointed a lecturer in the University College of Law at Nagpur from 1978 to 1980. Desai was elected as president of the District Bar Association of Nagpur from 1980 to 1982. In 1983, he was appointed dean of, Faculty of Law, Nagpur University. In 1985 he was executive councilor of Nagpur University and in 1985 he became a member of the Bar Council of Maharashtra.

Desai was elevated as an additional judge of the Bombay High Court on 21 November 1986 and was made a permanent judge on 15 June 1987. Desai was transferred to Allahabad High Court on 8 March 1999. He was appointed acting chief justice of Uttarakhand High Court on 9 November 2000. On 6 December 2000, Desai took oath as the first chief justice of the Uttarakhand High Court. Amidst a controversy where Justice Ashok Desai was superseded by a puisne judge for elevation to the Supreme Court of India, he resigned from his office on 1 April 2003. After his resignation, Desai started practicing in the Hon'ble Supreme Court of India and continued rendering services to the needy litigants. In August 2003, he was designated as a senior advocate, the Supreme Court of India. In April 2004, he was elected as a senior executive for the Supreme Court Bar Association.

Desai was keenly associated with many committees and institutions, such as the Indian Law Institute at New Delhi, Centre for Corporate Research & Training set up by the Institute of Company Secretaries of India, Legal Education Committee, Bar Council of India, and Committee for selection of Vice Chancellor, Amravati and Nagpur Universities. He was the founder president of the Global Jurist Foundation. He was chairman of the Preparatory Committee of the International Conferences of Chief Justices on Article 51 of the Constitution of India held in India. During his tenure as a judge of this court and as the chief justice of Uttarakhand High Court, Desai has rendered many landmark and thought-provoking judgments.

Desai had authored some well-read books, some of which are "Justice versus Justices", "Environmental Jurisprudence", "Justicing the People", and "Law of Contempt".

== Personal life ==
Justice Desai belonged to a very poor agriculturist family. He had a misfortune of losing his father at the age of 6. Despite his early setback, only by his sheer determination and hard work Justice Desai achieve prominence as an advocate and then as a Judge. He married Aruna Desai who was a teacher. Justice Desai has two sons, Satyajit A. Desai, and Abhijeet A. Desai, both of them are lawyers. Satyajit Desai practices in the Supreme Court of India and is married to Anagha Desai, who is an Advocate-on-Record in the Supreme Court of India. Abhijeet Desai practices in the Bombay High Court.
