= Rajeev Sharma (judge) =

Former Judge of Punjab and Haryana High Court

Hon'ble Justice (Retd.) Rajeev Sharma

Judge of Punjab and Haryana High Court
- In office 13 November 2018 – 7 October 2020
- Nominated by: Ranjan Gogoi
- Appointed by: Ram Nath Kovind
- Acting Chief Justice
- In office 23 September 2019 – 5 October 2019
- Appointed by: Ram Nath Kovind
- Preceded by: Krishna Murari
- Succeeded by: Ravi Shankar Jha

Judge of Uttarakhand High Court
- In office 26 September 2016 – 12 November 2018
- Nominated by: T. S. Thakur
- Appointed by: Pranab Mukherjee
- Acting Chief Justice
- In office 7 August 2018 – 2 November 2018
- Appointed by: Ram Nath Kovind
- Preceded by: K. M. Joseph
- Succeeded by: R. Ranganathan

Judge of Himachal Pradesh High Court
- In office 3 April 2007 – 25 September 2016
- Nominated by: K. G. Balakrishnan
- Appointed by: A. P. J. Abdul Kalam

Personal details
- Born: 8 October 1958 (age 67) Himachal Pradesh
- Education: Himachal Pradesh University, (LL.B)

Rajeev Sharma (born 8 October 1958) is a retired Indian judge who served as judge in Punjab and Haryana High Court, Uttarakhand High Court and Himachal Pradesh High Court. He also served as Acting Chief Justice of Uttarakhand High Court and Punjab and Haryana High Court.

== Education and career ==
Sharma was born on 8 October 1958, and launched his legal career in 1982 after earning his law degree from Himachal Pradesh University. Over the next twenty years, he built a highly successful practice centered primarily at the Himachal Pradesh High Court, where he specialized in constitutional law, administrative disputes, labour and employment matters, and environmental litigation. His exceptional expertise and standing in the legal community culminated in his designation as a Senior Advocate in 2002. Throughout his career, he also travelled extensively across dozens of nations—including the USA, UK, Germany, China, Russia, and New Zealand—to study and observe diverse international legal systems.

His transition to the judiciary began on 3 April 2007, when he was appointed as an Additional Judge of the Himachal Pradesh High Court, later becoming a permanent Judge on 31 March 2013. He was subsequently transferred to the Uttarakhand High Court, taking charge on 26 September 2016, where his seniority eventually led to his appointment as the Acting Chief Justice of the state on 7 August 2018 when the then chief justice K. M. Joseph was elevated to Supreme Court of India. Later that same year, he transitioned to the High Court of Punjab and Haryana, officially assuming his duties as a judge there on 13 November 2018, and here too he served as Acting Chief Justice in September 2019 when the then chief justice Krishna Murari was elevated to Supreme Court of India. He retired as judge of Punjab and Haryana High Court on 7 October 2020.
