= Sudhanshu Dhulia =

Indian judge (born 1960)

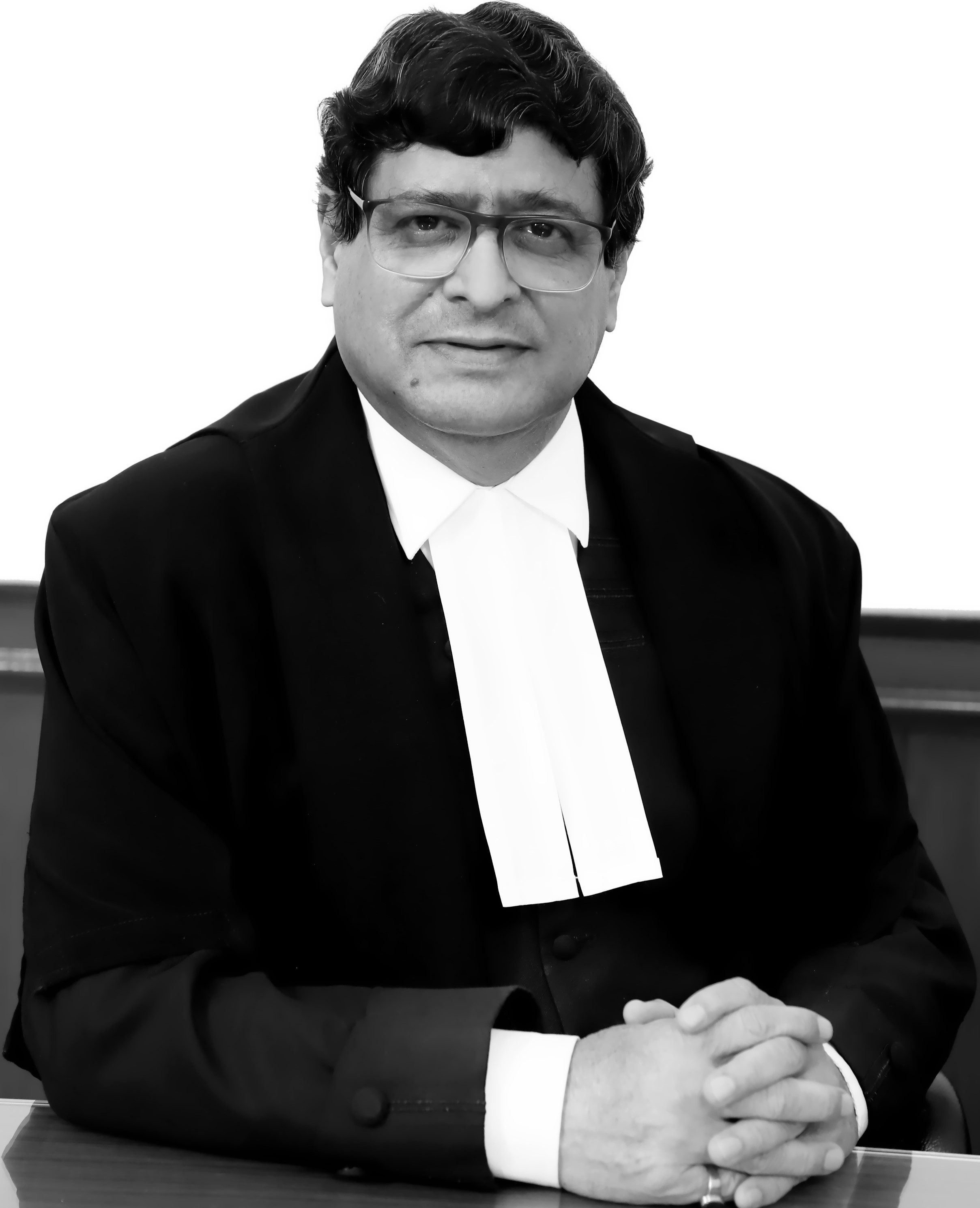
- Official portrait

Judge of the Supreme Court of India
- In office 9 May 2022 – 9 August 2025
- Nominated by: N. V. Ramana
- Appointed by: Ram Nath Kovind

39th Chief Justice of the Gauhati High Court
- In office 10 January 2021 – 8 May 2022
- Nominated by: Sharad Arvind Bobde
- Appointed by: Ram Nath Kovind
- Preceded by: Ajai Lamba; N. Kotiswar Singh (acting)
- Succeeded by: Rashmin Manharbhai Chhaya; N. Kotiswar Singh (acting)

Judge of the Uttarakhand High Court
- In office 1 November 2008 – 9 January 2021
- Nominated by: K. G. Balakrishnan
- Appointed by: Prathiba Patil

Personal details
- Born: 10 August 1960 (age 66) Lansdowne, Uttarakhand, India
- Relatives: Tigmanshu Dhulia (Brother)
- Education: Allahabad University

Sudhanshu Dhulia (born 10 August 1960) is a former judge of the Supreme Court of India. He is a former chief justice of the Gauhati High Court and judge of the Uttarakhand High Court.

== Early life ==
Dhulia was born in Lansdowne in Pauri Garhwal, Uttarakhand. His family hails from Pauri Garhwal district in Uttarakhand. He is the second son of K. C. Dhulia who was a judge of the Allahabad High Court and grandson of Bhairav Dutt Dhulia who was a freedom fighter and editor of Karmabhumi newspaper in Garhwal, Uttarakhand. Dhulia is an alumnus of Sainik School, Lucknow and Allahabad University. One of his brothers is the noted Indian film director Tigmanshu Dhulia.

== Career ==
Dhulia started his practice before the Allahabad High Court in 1986. As a part of the Bar, he was the legal counsel for Indian Institute of Technology Roorkee, State Industrial Development Corporation of Uttarakhand Limited, Bhagirathi River Valley Authority, amongst others.

Dhulia became the first Chief Standing Counsel of Uttarakhand state and later appointed the State Additional Advocate General. He was designated as a Senior Advocate by the Uttarakhand High Court in 2004.

He was also an honorary professor in the Uttarakhand Academy of Administration (ATI) Nainital.

=== Judicial career ===
Dhulia was elevated from the bar to the bench and appointed as judge of the Uttarakhand High Court on 1 November 2008. He was also appointed as the judge in-charge of education, Uttarakhand judicial and legal academy. He took oath of office of Chief Justice of Gauhati High Court on 10 January 2021 and served there until his elevation to the Supreme Court of India. He was elevated as judge of Supreme Court of India on 9 May 2022.
