= Government of Uttarakhand =

Indian State Government

- Seat of Government: Bhararisain (summer); Dehradun (winter)
- Website: uk.gov.in

Legislative branch
- Assembly: Uttarakhand Legislative Assembly
- Speaker: Ritu Khanduri Bhushan, BJP
- Members in Assembly: 70

Executive branch
- Governor: Dhal Singh Bisen
- Chief Minister: Pushkar Singh Dhami, BJP
- Chief Secretary: Anand Bardhan, IAS

Judiciary
- High Court: Uttarakhand High Court
- Chief Justice: Manoj Kumar Gupta
- District Courts: 13

The Government of Uttarakhand, also known as the State Government of Uttarakhand (earlier Uttaranchal), or locally as State Government, is the subnational government of the Indian state of Uttarakhand and its 13 Districts. It consists of an executive branch, led by the Governor of Uttarakhand, a legislative branch led by the Chief Minister of Uttarakhand and a judiciary branch, led by the Chief Justice of Uttarakhand. Uttarakhand was carved out of the Indian state Uttar Pradesh in the year 2000, separating the hilly region of Uttar Pradesh and the formation of the new state of Uttaranchal (now Uttarakhand).

Like other states in India, the head of state of Uttarakhand is the Governor, appointed by the President of India on the advice of the Union Government of India. The position of governor is largely ceremonial. The Chief Minister is the head of government and is vested the executive powers. Currently Bhararisain is the summer and Dehradun is the winter capital of Uttarakhand, and houses the Vidhan Sabha (Legislative Assembly) and the Secretariat in each capital. The Uttarakhand High Court, located in Nainital exercises jurisdiction over the whole state.

The present unicameral legislature of Uttarakhand is the Legislative Assembly of Uttarakhand. It comprises 70 Members of the Legislative Assembly (MLAs).

== See also ==
- Governor of Uttarakhand
- Chief Minister of Uttarakhand
- Uttarakhand Legislative Assembly
- Speaker of the Uttarakhand Legislative Assembly
- Leader of the Opposition in the Uttarakhand Legislative Assembly
- Cabinet of Uttarakhand
- List of Uttarakhand ministries
- List of agencies of the government of Uttarakhand
- List of departments of the government of Uttarakhand
- Chief Secretary of Uttarakhand
- Chief Justice of Uttarakhand
- List of judges of the Uttarakhand High Court
