= Sanjaya Kumar Mishra =

14th Chief Justice of Jharkhand High Court

Hon'ble Chief Justice (Retd.) Sanjaya Kumar Mishra
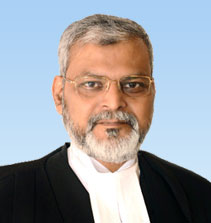

President of Goods & Services Tax Appellate Tribunal
- Incumbent
- Assumed office 5 May 2024
- Appointed by: Central Government of India
- Preceded by: Office established

14th Chief Justice of Jharkhand High Court
- In office 20 February 2023 – 28 December 2023
- Nominated by: D. Y. Chandrachud
- Appointed by: Droupadi Murmu
- Preceded by: Ravi Ranjan; A. K. Singh (acting)
- Succeeded by: B. R. Sarangi; Shree Chandrashekhar (acting)

Judge of Uttarakhand High Court
- In office 11 October 2021 – 19 February 2023
- Nominated by: N. V. Ramana
- Appointed by: Ram Nath Kovind
- Acting Chief Justice
- In office 24 December 2021 – 27 June 2022
- Appointed by: Ram Nath Kovind
- Preceded by: R. S. Chauhan
- Succeeded by: Vipin Sanghi

Judge of Orissa High Court
- In office 7 October 2009 – 10 October 2021
- Nominated by: K.G. Balakrishnan
- Appointed by: Pratibha Patil

Personal details
- Born: 29 December 1961 (age 64) Balangir, Orissa
- Parent(s): Markanda Mishra (father), Jyotirmayee Mishra (mother)
- Education: Rajendra College (B.Com), Delhi University (M.Com), Faculty of Law, University of Delhi (LL.B)

Sanjaya Kumar Mishra (born 29 December 1961) is a retired Indian judge, who is currently serving as the first President of the Goods & Services Tax Appellate Tribunal. He had served as the 14th Chief Justice of Jharkhand High Court. He was a judge and Acting Chief Justice of Uttarakhand High Court. He previously served judge of Orissa High Court.

== Education ==
Mishra was born on 29 December 1961 in Balangir, Odisha to Markanda Mishra and Jyotirmayee Mishra. His father was also a lawyer. He started his schooling at Tikra Upper Primary School and completed at Prithviraj High School, Bolangir, in 1977. He graduated with a B.Com. (Honours) degree from Rajendra College in 1982 and did his Master of Commerce from the University of Delhi in 1984. He completed his LL.B. at the university's Faculty of Law, University of Delhi in 1987. Mishra joined the legal profession in March 1988 and began practising at the Bolangir District Courts under the guidance of his father. He independently handled several sessions cases, civil suits and civil appeals, gaining experience in both criminal and civil litigation. He also served as an honorary law lecturer at Bolangir Law College.

== Career ==
Mishra secured first position in the District Judges recruitment examination for Bar quota. On 16 February 1999, he joined the judicial services as Additional District and Sessions Judge at Jeypore in Odisha. He subsequently served as District and Sessions Judge in Sundergarh and Dhenkanal and as Special Judge (CBI) in Bhubaneswar. He also served as Registrar General of the Orissa High Court.

He was elevated as a judge of the Orissa High Court on 7 October 2009. Mishra disposed of nearly fifty thousand cases during his 12 year tenure in Odisha. On 11 October 2021, he was transferred to the Uttarakhand High Court. He also served as Executive Chairman of the Uttarakhand State Legal Services Authority from October 2021 to February 2023. During his tenure in Uttarakhand, on 24 December 2021, he was appointed as acting chief Justice following the retirement of chief justice Raghvendra Singh Chauhan and served as such until appointment of Vipin Sanghi as new chief justice on 28 June 2022.

In February 2023, He was appointed as the 14th Chief Justice of Jharkhand High Court and took oath on 20 February 2023 and served for 10 months until his retirement on 28 December 2023.

== Post retirement ==
After retirement in December 2023, he was appointed as the first President of the newly constituted Goods and services Tax Appellate Tribunal at New Delhi, important appellate institution dealing with disputes arising under India's goods and services tax framework. He was sworn in as President on 5 May 2024 by the Union Finance Minister Nirmala Sitharaman.
