= Raghvendra Singh Chauhan =

Former Chief Justice of Uttarakhand High Court (2021)

Hon'ble Chief Justice (Retd.) Raghvendra Singh Chauhan
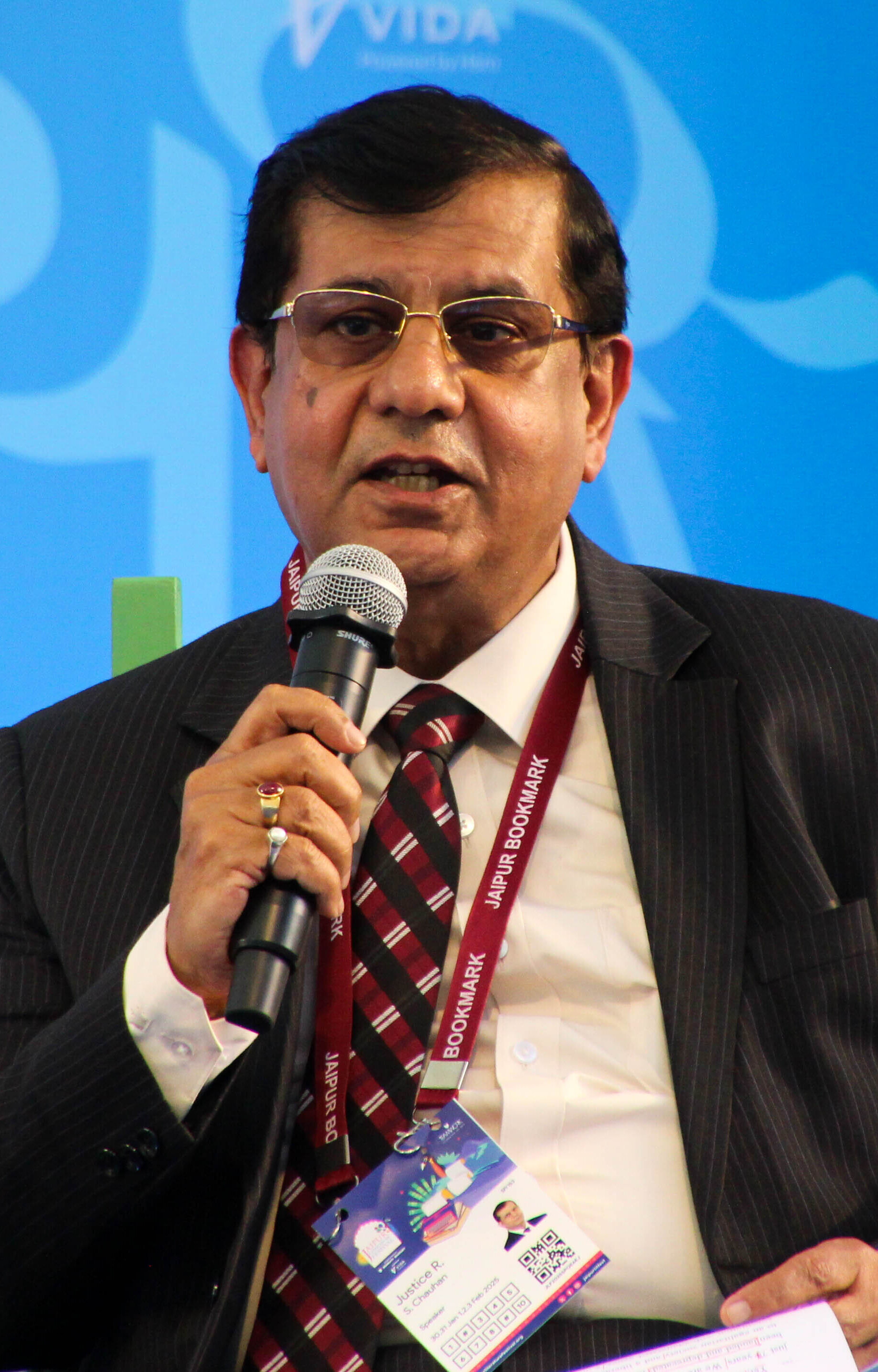
- Chauhan in 2025

14th Chief Justice of Uttarakhand High Court
- In office 7 January 2021 – 23 December 2021
- Nominated by: S. A. Bobde
- Appointed by: Ram Nath Kovind
- Preceded by: R. Ranganathan; Ravi Malimath (acting)
- Succeeded by: Vipin Sanghi; S. K. Mishra (acting)

2nd Chief Justice of Telangana High Court
- In office 22 June 2019 – 6 January 2021
- Nominated by: Ranjan Gogoi
- Appointed by: Ram Nath Kovind
- Preceded by: T. B. Radhakrishnan
- Succeeded by: Hima Kohli

Judge of Telangana High Court
- In office 23 November 2018 – 21 June 2019; Acting CJ : 3 April 2019 - 21 June 2019
- Nominated by: Ranjan Gogoi
- Appointed by: Ram Nath Kovind

Judge of Karnataka High Court
- In office 10 March 2015 – 22 November 2018
- Nominated by: H. L. Dattu
- Appointed by: Pranab Mukherjee

Judge of Rajasthan High Court
- In office 13 June 2005 – 9 March 2015
- Nominated by: R. C. Lahoti
- Appointed by: A. P. J. Abdul Kalam

Personal details
- Born: 24 December 1959 (age 66)
- Education: BA (History) and LL.B
- Alma mater: Delhi University, Arcadia University

Raghvendra Singh Chauhan (born on 24 December 1959) is a retired Indian judge. He is a former Chief Justice of Uttarakhand High Court and Telangana High Court. He has also served as judge of Telangana High Court, Karnataka High Court and Rajasthan High Court.

== Career ==
He was born on 24 December 1959. He completed his B.A. from Arcadia University and L.L.B from Delhi University. He started his career as an Advocate on 13 November 1983 in the Rajasthan High Court. His field of specialization is in criminal and service matters.

He was appointed an Additional Judge of the Rajasthan High Court on 13 June 2005 and was made Permanent on 24 January 2008. He was transferred as a Judge of Karnataka High Court on 10 March 2015. Again he was transferred as judge of Telangana High Court on 23 November 2018.

He was appointed Acting Chief Justice of the Telangana High Court on 3 April 2019. On 22 June 2019, he was appointed Chief Justice of Telangana High Court.

He was appointed Chief Justice of Uttarakhand High Court on 31 December 2020 and took oath on 7 January 2021.
