= Manoj Kumar Gupta =

15th Chief Justice of Uttarakhand High Court

Hon'ble Chief Justice (Retd.) Manoj Kumar Gupta

15th Chief Justice of Uttarakhand High Court
- In office 10 January 2026 – 8 October 2026
- Nominated by: Surya Kant
- Appointed by: Droupadi Murmu
- Preceded by: Guhanathan Narendar
- Succeeded by: M. K. Tiwari (acting)

Judge of Allahabad High Court
- In office 12 April 2013 – 9 January 2025
- Nominated by: Altamas Kabir
- Appointed by: Pranab Mukherjee
- Acting Chief Justice
- In office 22 November 2023 – 4 February 2024
- Appointed by: Droupadi Murmu
- Preceded by: Pritinker Diwaker
- Succeeded by: Arun Bhansali

Personal details
- Born: 9 October 1964 (age 61) Prayagraj, Uttar Pradesh
- Education: Lucknow University (LL.B)

Manoj Kumar Gupta (born 9 October 1964) is a retired Indian jurist, who has served as the 15th Chief Justice of Uttarakhand High Court in 2026. He previously served as a judge of the Allahabad High Court.

== Life and career ==
Gupta was born on 9 October 1964 at Prayagraj in Uttar Pradesh. He graduated in Law from Lucknow University in 1987 and enrolled as an advocate on 6 December 1987. He practised primarily on the civil, rent-control and constitutional sides, with his earlier practice also encompassing criminal, taxation, labour, company, service and revenue matters. He has recalled that during his academic years he had initially contemplated pursuing engineering before eventually choosing law as his career.

He was elevated as an Additional Judge of the Allahabad High Court on 12 April 2013 and became permanent on 10 April 2015. Following the retirement of Chief Justice Pritinker Diwaker, he served as Acting Chief Justice of the Allahabad High Court from 22 November 2023 to 4 February 2024.

In December 2025, the Supreme Court Collegium recommended him to be appointed as Chief Justice of the Uttarakhand High Court. The Government subsequently notified his appointment on 8 January 2026, and he took oath as Chief Justice on 10 January 2026, succeeding Chief Justice Guhanathan Narendar.

He retired from office of Chief Justice of Uttarakhand on 8 October 2026.
