= S. H. Kapadia =

38th Chief Justice of India

Sarosh Homi Kapadia
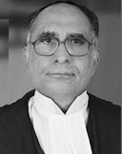
- Justice Sarosh Homi Kapadia

38th Chief Justice of India
- In office 12 May 2010 – 28 September 2012
- Appointed by: Pratibha Patil
- Preceded by: K. G. Balakrishnan
- Succeeded by: Altamas Kabir

Judge of Supreme Court of India
- In office 18 December 2003 – 11 May 2010
- Nominated by: V. N. Khare
- Appointed by: A. P. J. Abdul Kalam

2nd Chief Justice of Uttarakhand High Court
- In office 5 August 2003 – 17 December 2003
- Nominated by: V. N. Khare
- Appointed by: A. P. J. Abdul Kalam
- Preceded by: Ashok Desai; Prakash Chandra Verma (acting)
- Succeeded by: V. S. Sirpurkar; Prakash Chandra Verma (acting)

Judge of Bombay High Court
- In office 8 October 1991 – 4 August 2003
- Nominated by: Ranganath Misra
- Appointed by: R. Venkataraman

Personal details
- Born: 29 September 1947 Bombay, Bombay Province, India
- Died: 4 January 2016 (aged 68) Mumbai, Maharashtra, India
- Spouse: Shahnaz Kapadia

Sarosh Homi Kapadia (29 September 1947 – 4 January 2016) was the 38th Chief Justice of India. He was the first chief justice born after the partition of India (Dominion of India).

== Career ==
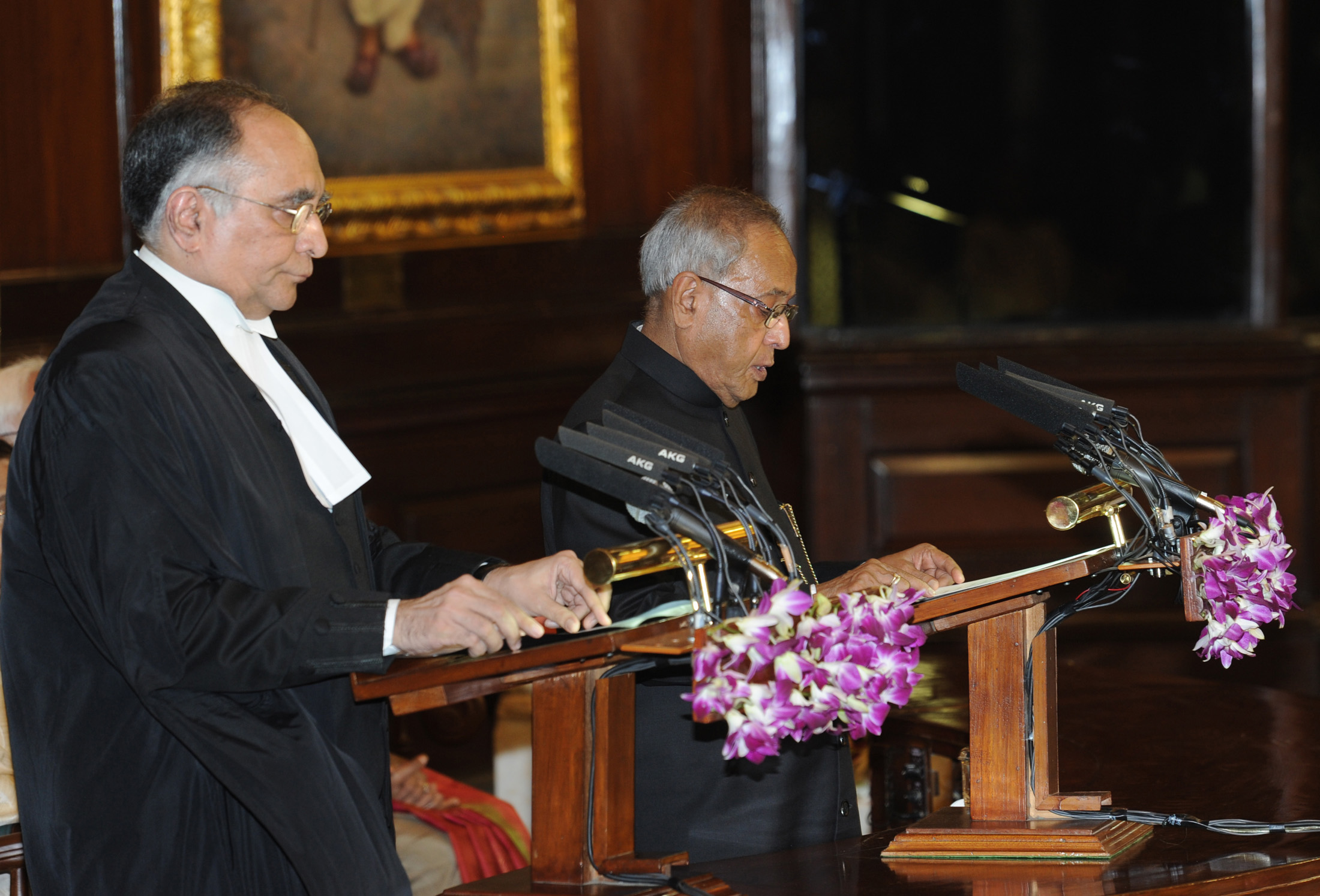
Justice Kapadia administering the oath of office to the President of India Pranab Mukherjee on 25 July 2012

S. H. Kapadia was born in Bombay in 1947. He graduated from Government Law College, Mumbai which is the oldest law college in Asia. Kapadia started his career as a class IV employee. He later became a law clerk in a lawyer's office in Mumbai. He joined Gagrat & Co., a law firm, as a clerk and later went on to work with Feroze Damania, a highly respected "firebrand" labour lawyer. He later joined as an advocate in the Bombay High Court on 10 September 1974.

Kapadia was appointed an additional judge of the Bombay High Court on 8 October 1991, and on 23 March 1993 his appointment was made permanent. On 5 August 2003, he became the Chief Justice of the Uttarakhand High Court. On 18 December 2003, he was appointed a judge of the Supreme Court. On 12 May 2010, he was sworn in as the Chief Justice of India by President Pratibha Patil. He retired on 29 September 2012. During his tenure as chief justice he was the chairman of the General Council of the Gujarat National Law University and the Visitor of the National Law School of India University. Over the course of his time on the Supreme Court, Kapadia authored 305 judgments and sat on 1,074 benches.

As Chief Justice of India, Kapadia administered oath of office to the 13th President of India, Pranab Mukherjee.

== Personal life ==
Kapadia was married to Shahnaz and has a son who is a chartered accountant and a daughter. Kapadia was a devout Zoroastrian. He was also interested in economics, public finance, theoretical physics, and Hindu and Buddhist philosophies. He died on 4 January 2016 in Mumbai.

== Notable judgments ==
=== Quashing of the appointment of Central Vigilance Commissioner ===
On 3 March 2011, a three-member bench headed by Kapadia, quashed the appointment of Chief Vigilance Commissioner, Polayil Joseph Thomas, made by the High Power Committee comprising Prime Minister Manmohan Singh, Home Minister P. Chidambaram and Leader of the Opposition Sushma Swaraj (dissenting). The judgment caused severe embarrassment for the government and made Manmohan Singh admit the error in appointment. While the judgement was welcomed by most media pundits, some experts have expressed their concerns of miscarriage of justice. Former IAS officer, S. M. Murshed writes, 'the ratio decidendi of the Hon’ble Supreme Court is a bit difficult to comprehend, for, in the last analysis, the entire case against Thomas rested on a solitary, misconceived FIR which was filed as an afterthought and which should never have been filed. Given the facts, Manmohan Singh did no substantive wrong and he did not commit any error (in appointing Thomas).'

=== Dissenting judgement in Lalu Prasad Yadav's bail cancellation case ===
Kapadia was part of the three-member Supreme Court bench that decided a PIL filed by two NDA leaders seeking the cancellation of bail of Rashtriya Janata Dal chief Lalu Prasad and his wife and former Bihar Chief Minister Rabri Devi for their interference in the judicial process in the disproportionate assets (DA) and Income Tax cases against them.

The verdict, by majority of 2:1, went in favour of Prasad, but Kapadia gave a dissenting judgement saying the income tax department should have filed an appeal against the Income Tax Appellate Tribunal (ITAT) order. On the issue of promotion of judge Munni Lal Paswan, he said, while competence and suitability of two other judges, who were promoted to the post of Special Judge along with Paswan, were determined on the basis of annual confidential report (ACRs) and inspecting the judges' reports, the criteria were not applied while promoting Paswan who had been found to be slow in disposing cases.

=== Vodafone judgment ===
The Vodafone judgment was among the most high-profile of Kapadia's tenure.

=== Others ===
Kapadia delivered a landmark judgement relating to succession of property on 30 April 2005 in which he ruled out the possibility of conducting the DNA test.

== Quotes ==
- "I am proud to be an Indian. India is the only country where a member of the minority Parsi community with a population of 1,67,000, like myself, can aspire to attain the post of the Chief Justice of India. These things do not happen in our neighbouring countries."
  - Chief Justice Kapadia speaking at the Independence Day celebrations in the Supreme Court.
- "I come from a poor family. I started my career as a class IV employee and the only asset I possess is integrity"
- "Right to life, we have said, includes environmental protection, right to live with dignity. Now we have included right to sleep, where are we going? It is not a criticism. Is it capable of being enforced? When you expand the right, the judge must explore the enforceability."
  - Chief Justice Kapadia during a lecture on "Jurisprudence of Constitutional Structure".
- "A day might come when the rule of law will stand reduced to a rope of sand."
  - Justice Kapadia reacting to a flood of Public Interest Litigations (PIL) being filed in the Supreme Court against corruption and non performing government authorities.

Legal offices
| Preceded by K. G. Balakrishnan | Chief Justice of India; 2010 –2012 | Succeeded by Altamas Kabir |
