= Uttarakhand High Court =

High Court of Uttarakhand, India

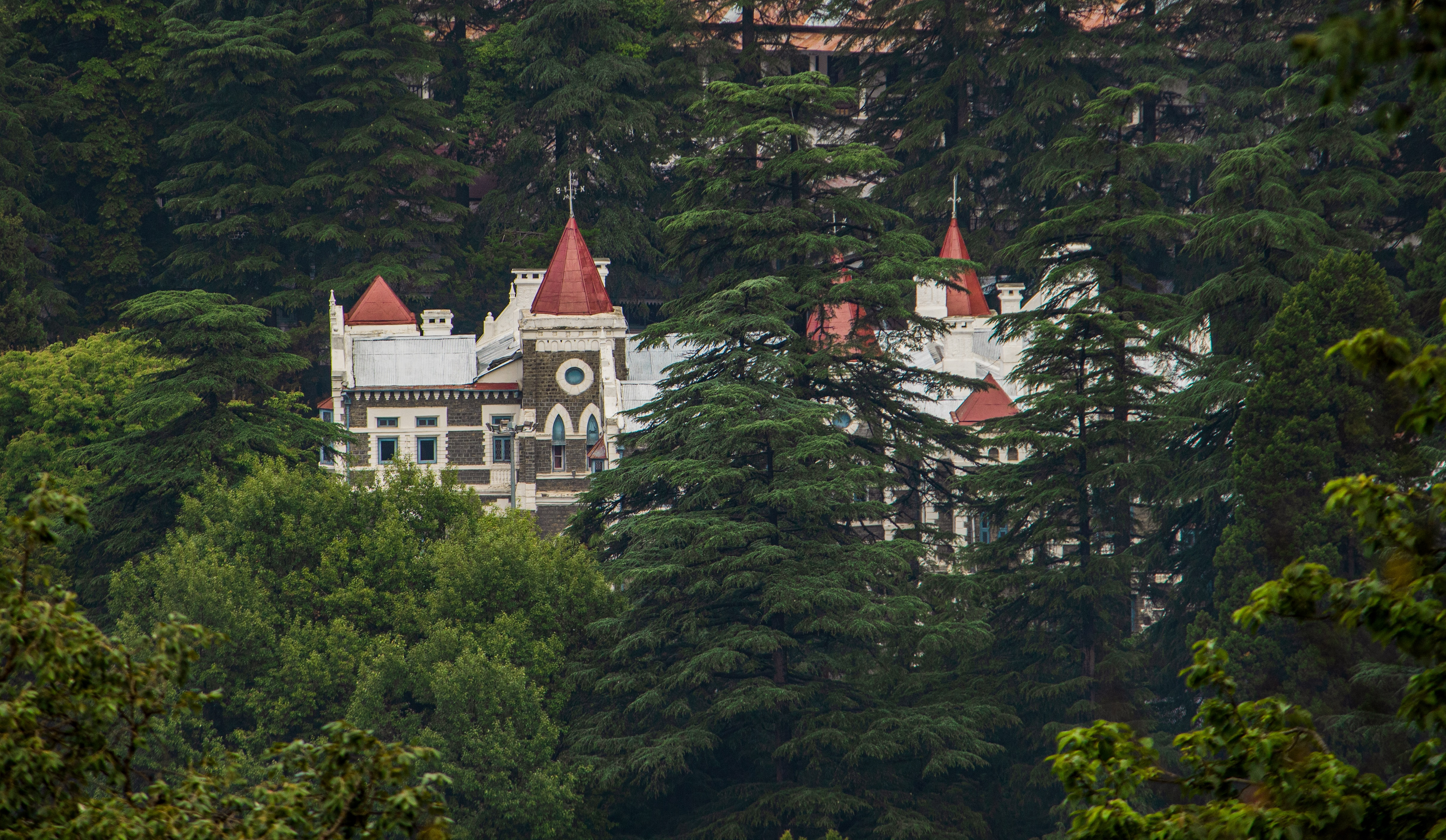
- The High court building
- Interactive map of Uttarakhand High Court
- 29.3958°N 79.4477°E
- Established: 9 November 2000; 25 years ago
- Jurisdiction: Uttarakhand
- Location: Nainital, Uttarakhand
- Coordinates: 29.3958°N 79.4477°E
- Composition method: Presidential with confirmation of Chief Justice of India and Governor of Uttarakhand
- Authorised by: Constitution of India
- Judge term length: mandatory retirement by age of 62
- Number of positions: 11 (9 Permanent Judges + 2 Additional Judges)
- Website: Uttarakhand High Court

Chief Justice
- Currently: Manoj Kumar Gupta
- Since: 10 January 2026

The Uttarakhand High Court is the High Court of the state of Uttarakhand in India. The Uttarakhand High Court was established on 9 November 2000 after the separation of the state of Uttarakhand from Uttar Pradesh.

The sanctioned judge strength at the time of creation in 2000 was 7; this was increased to 9 in 2003. Justice Ashok Desai was the inaugural holder of the office. Former Chief Justices of Uttarakhand Sarosh Homi Kapadia and Jagdish Singh Khehar later went on to become Chief Justice of India.

== History ==
The Uttarakhand High Court is a relatively new addition to India's judiciary system. The building of Uttarakhand High Court was constructed by Santoni MacDonald in 1900.

Uttarakhand was carved out from the state of Uttar Pradesh on 9 November 2000 under the Uttar Pradesh Reorganisation Act, 2000. The High Court of Uttarakhand was also established on the same day.

The Uttarakhand High Court is located in Nainital, a scenic hill station in the Kumaon region of the state.

The High Court initially consisted of just five court rooms but later more court rooms were added. A huge Chief Justice Court Block and a Block of Lawyers’ chambers were built in 2007.

== Landmark judgements ==
=== Status of rivers as legal persons ===
In March 2017, Uttarakhand High Court's single-judge bench presided by Justice Rajeev Sharma, mandated that the rivers Ganges and Yamuna as well as all water bodies are "living entities" i.e. "legal person", and appointed 3 persons as trustees to protect the rights of rivers against the pollution caused by the humans.

=== Rohit Sagar v. State of Uttarakhand ===
Rohit Sagar v. State of Uttarakhand (2021) is a case where Uttarakhand High Court's two-judges bench presided by Chief Justice Raghvendra Singh Chauhan and Justice Narayan Singh Dhanik, held that the legal adults have the fundamental right to choose their own partners, and directed the Uttarakhand Police to provide necessary protection for the individuals and their property.

== List of sitting judges of the Uttarakhand High Court ==
There are currently seven sitting judges including the Acting Chief Justice, with post of two permanent judges and two posts of additional judge lying vacant. Following is the list of the current serving judges of the Uttarakhand High Court, ordered by seniority.

| No. | Name | Date of Appointment | Date of Retirement | Type of Vacancy | Parent High Court |
|---|---|---|---|---|---|
Permanent Judges
| 1 | Manoj Kumar Tiwari (Acting Chief Justice) | 19 May 2017 | 18 September 2027 | Bar | Uttarakhand |
| 2 | Ravindra Maithani | 3 December 2018 | 24 June 2027 | Bench | Uttarakhand |
| 3 | Rakesh Thapliyal | 28 April 2023 | 14 November 2031 | Bar | Uttarakhand |
| 4 | Pankaj Purohit | 28 April 2023 | 27 July 2030 | Bar | Uttarakhand |
| 5 | Alok Mahra | 14 February 2025 | 31 January 2034 | Bar | Uttarakhand |
| 6 | Subhash Upadhyay | 30 May 2025 | 11 December 2034 | Bar | Uttarakhand |
| 7 | Siddharth Sah | 8 January 2026 | 3 September 2033 | Bar | Uttarakhand |
| 8 | Vacant | | | | |
| 9 | Vacant | | | | |
Additional Judges
| 10 | Vacant | | | | |
| 11 | Vacant | | | | |

=== Registrar General ===
Kaushal Kishore Shukla is the current Registrar General of the Uttarakhand High Court. He assumed office on 12 October 2026.

== Judges elevated as Chief Justices ==
This sections contains list of only those judges elevated as chief justices whose parent high court is Uttarakhand. This includes those judges who, at the time of appointment as chief justice, may not be serving in Uttarakhand High Court but this list does not include judges who at the time of appointment as chief justice were serving in Uttarakhand High Court but does not have Uttarakhand as their Parent High Court.

Colour Key

- Female Chief Justice
- Served as Chief Justice of India

Symbol Key

- ^{‡} Elevated to Supreme Court of India
- ^{RES} Resigned
- ^{†} Died in office

| Name | Image | Appointed Chief Justice in High Court | Date of appointment | | Date of retirement (Note: this includes date of resignation, death and elevation to supreme court) | Tenure | |
| Name | Image | Appointed Chief Justice in High Court | As Judge | As Chief Justice | Date of retirement | As Chief Justice | As Judge (Note: also includes tenure as Chief Justice) |
|---|---|---|---|---|---|---|---|
| Prafulla Chandra Pant | | Meghalaya | 29 June 2004 | 20 September 2013 | 12 August 2014^{[‡]} | 327 days | 10 years, 45 days |
| Vijay Kumar Bist | | Sikkim | 1 November 2008 | 30 October 2018 | 16 September 2019 | 322 days | 10 years, 320 days |
| Sudhanshu Dhulia | | Gauhati | 1 November 2008 | 10 January 2021 | 8 May 2022^{[‡]} | 1 year, 119 days | 13 years, 189 days |

=== Judges appointed as Acting Chief Justice ===
| Name | Appointed as Acting Chief Justice in High Court | Date of appointment as Judge | Period as Acting Chief Justice | Date of retirement | Tenure as Acting Chief Justice | Tenure as Judge | Ref.. |
|---|---|---|---|---|---|---|---|
| B. C. Kandapal | Uttarakhand | 29 June 2004 | 10 Sep 2009 – 25 Sep 2009 | 16 August 2010 | 16 days | 6 years, 49 days | |
| Vijay Kumar Bist | Uttarakhand | 1 November 2008 | 5 Jun 2014 – 30 Jul 2014 | 16 September 2019 | 56 days | 10 years, 320 days | |
| Manoj Kumar Tiwari | Uttarakhand | 19 May 2017 | 27 Oct 2023 – 3 Feb 2024 | Incumbent | 100 days | 9 years, 151 days | |
| Manoj Kumar Tiwari | Uttarakhand | 19 May 2017 | 11 Oct 2024 – 25 Dec 2024 | Incumbent | 76 days | 9 years, 151 days | |
| Manoj Kumar Tiwari | Uttarakhand | 19 May 2017 | 9 Oct 2026 – Incumbent | Incumbent | 8 days | 9 years, 151 days | |

== Judges elevated to Supreme Court ==
This section includes the list of only those judges whose parent high court was Uttarakhand. This includes those judges who, at the time of elevation to Supreme Court of India, may not be serving in Uttarakhand High Court but this list does not include judges who at the time of elevation were serving in Uttarakhand High Court but does not have Uttarakhand as their Parent High Court.

Colour Key

- Female Judge
- Served as Chief Justice of India

Symbol Key

- ^{RES} Resigned
- ^{†} Died in office

| # | Name of the Judge | Image | Date of Appointment | | Date of Retirement | Tenure | | | Immediately preceding office |
| # | Name of the Judge | Image | In Parent High Court | In Supreme Court | Date of Retirement | In High Court(s) | In Supreme Court | Total tenure (Note: Includes both tenure as High Court Judge as well as Supreme Court Judge) | Immediately preceding office |
|---|---|---|---|---|---|---|---|---|---|
| 1 | Prafulla Chandra Pant | | 29 June 2004 | 13 August 2014 | 29 August 2017 | 10 years, 45 days | 3 years, 17 days | 13 years, 62 days | 2nd Chief Justice of the Meghalaya High Court |
| 2 | Sudhanshu Dhulia | | 1 November 2008 | 9 May 2022 | 9 August 2025 | 13 years, 189 days | 3 years, 93 days | 16 years, 282 days | 39th Chief Justice of the Gauhati High Court |

== See also ==
- Chief Justice of Uttarakhand
- List of judges of the Uttarakhand High Court
- High courts of India
- List of sitting judges of the high courts of India
- Supreme Court of India
- List of sitting judges of the Supreme Court of India
- Bar Council of Uttarakhand
- District Courts of India
- Nyaya panchayat
- Uttarakhand Lok Adalat
- Uttarakhand Lokayukta
- Judiciary of India
