= List of former judges of the Supreme Court of India =

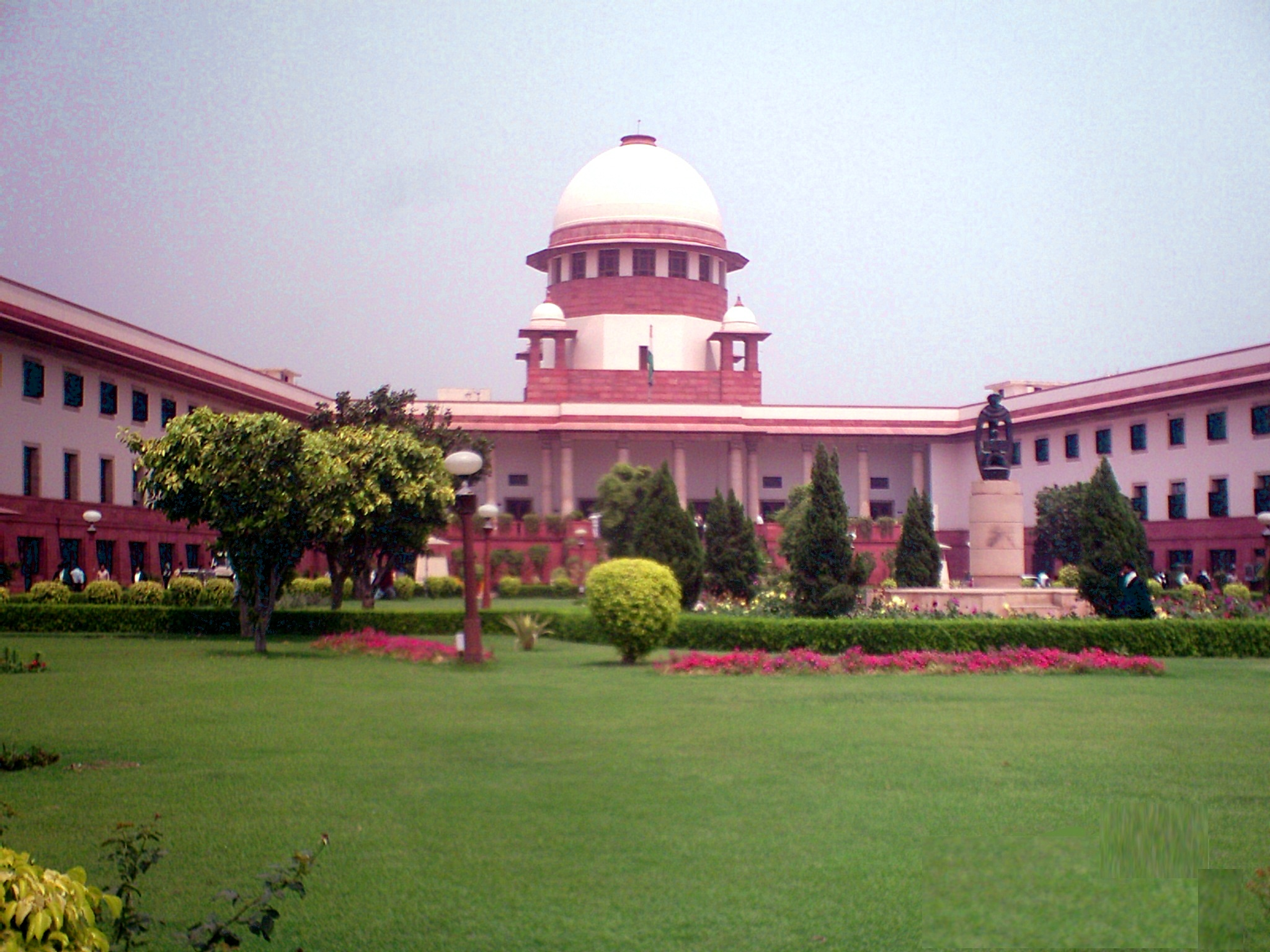
Supreme Court Building

The following is a list of former Judges of the Supreme Court of India since its inception on 26 January 1950. A total of 249 judges have served in the court (excluding sitting judges). The list has been arranged on the basis of date of appointment with Chief Justices mentioned first.

== Former chief justices ==
Sr.No.	Portrait	Name of the Chief Justice	Date of appointment	Date of appointment as CJI	Date of retirement	Tenure Length	Tenure Length as CJI
1		H. J. Kania	28 January 1950	28 January 1950	6 November 1951	1 year, 282 days	1 year, 282 days
2		M. Patanjali Sastri	28 January 1950	7 November 1951	3 January 1954	3 years, 341 days	2 years, 57 days
3		Mehr Chand Mahajan	28 January 1950	4 January 1954	22 December 1954	4 years, 329 days	352 days
4		Bijan Kumar Mukherjea	28 January 1950	23 December 1954	31 January 1956	6 years, 4 days	1 year, 39 days
5		Sudhi Ranjan Das	28 January 1950	1 February 1956	30 September 1959	9 years, 246 days	3 years, 241 days
6		Bhuvaneshwar Prasad Sinha	3 December 1954	1 October 1959	31 January 1964	9 years, 59 days	4 years, 122 days
7	Pralhad Balacharya Gajendragadkar	P. B. Gajendragadkar	17 January 1957	1 February 1964	15 March 1966	9 years, 57 days	2 years, 42 days
8		Amal Kumar Sarkar	4 March 1957	16 March 1966	29 June 1966	9 years, 117 days	105 days
9		Koka Subba Rao	31 January 1958	30 June 1966	11 April 1967^{‡}	9 years, 70 days	285 days
10		Kailas Nath Wanchoo	11 August 1958	12 April 1967	24 February 1968	9 years, 197 days	318 days
11		Mohammad Hidayatullah	1 December 1958	25 February 1968	16 December 1970	12 years, 15 days	2 years, 294 days
12		Jayantilal Chhotalal Shah	12 October 1959	17 December 1970	21 January 1971	11 years, 101 days	35 days
13		S. M. Sikri	3 February 1964	22 January 1971	25 April 1973	9 years, 81 days	2 years, 93 days
14		A. N. Ray	1 August 1969	26 April 1973	27 January 1977	7 years, 179 days	3 years, 276 days
15		Mirza Hameedullah Beg	10 December 1971	29 January 1977	21 February 1978	6 years, 73 days	1 year, 23 days
16		Y. V. Chandrachud	28 August 1972	22 February 1978	11 July 1985	12 years, 317 days	7 years, 139 days
17		P. N. Bhagwati	17 July 1973	12 July 1985	20 December 1986	13 years, 156 days	1 year, 161 days
18		Raghunandan Swarup Pathak	20 February 1978	21 December 1986	18 June 1989	11 years, 118 days	2 years, 179 days
19		Engalaguppe Seetharamiah Venkataramiah	8 March 1979	19 June 1989	17 December 1989	10 years, 284 days	181 days
20		Sabyasachi Mukherjee	15 March 1983	18 December 1989	25 September 1990	7 years, 194 days	281 days
21		Ranganath Misra	15 March 1983	26 September 1990	24 November 1991	8 years, 254 days	1 year, 59 days
22		Kamal Narain Singh	10 March 1986	25 November 1991	12 December 1991	5 years, 277 days	17 days
23		Madhukar Hiralal Kania	1 May 1987	13 December 1991	17 November 1992	5 years, 200 days	340 days
24		Lalit Mohan Sharma	5 October 1987	18 November 1992	11 February 1993	5 years, 129 days	85 days
25		M. N. Venkatachaliah	5 October 1987	12 February 1993	24 October 1994	7 years, 19 days	1 year, 254 days
26		Aziz Mushabber Ahmadi	14 December 1988	25 October 1994	24 March 1997	8 years, 100 days	2 years, 150 days
27		J. S. Verma	3 June 1989	25 March 1997	17 January 1998	8 years, 228 days	298 days
28		Madan Mohan Punchhi	6 October 1989	18 January 1998	9 October 1998	9 years, 3 days	264 days
29		Adarsh Sein Anand	18 November 1991	10 October 1998	31 October 2001	9 years, 347 days	3 years, 21 days
30		Sam Piroj Bharucha	1 July 1992	1 November 2001	5 May 2002	9 years, 308 days	185 days
31		Bhupinder Nath Kirpal	11 September 1995	6 May 2002	7 November 2002	7 years, 57 days	185 days
32	Gopal Ballav Pattanaik	Gopal Ballav Pattanaik	11 September 1995	8 November 2002	18 December 2002	7 years, 98 days	40 days
33		Vishweshwar Nath Khare	21 March 1997	19 December 2002	1 May 2004	7 years, 41 days	1 year, 134 days
34		S. Rajendra Babu	25 September 1997	2 May 2004	31 May 2004	6 years, 249 days	29 days
35		Ramesh Chandra Lahoti	9 December 1998	1 June 2004	31 October 2005	6 years, 326 days	1 year, 152 days
36		Yogesh Kumar Sabharwal	28 January 2000	1 November 2005	13 January 2007	6 years, 350 days	1 year, 73 days
37		K. G. Balakrishnan	8 June 2000	14 January 2007	12 May 2010	9 years, 338 days	3 years, 118 days
38		S. H. Kapadia	18 December 2003	12 May 2010	28 September 2012	8 years, 285 days	2 years, 139 days
39		Altamas Kabir	9 September 2005	29 September 2012	18 July 2013	7 years, 312 days	292 days
40		P. Sathasivam	21 August 2007	19 July 2013	26 April 2014	6 years, 248 days	281 days
41		Rajendra Mal Lodha	17 December 2008	27 April 2014	27 September 2014	5 years, 284 days	153 days
42	Ranjan Gogoi	H. L. Dattu	17 December 2008	28 September 2014	2 December 2015	6 years, 350 days	1 year, 65 days
43		T. S. Thakur	17 November 2009	3 December 2015	3 January 2017	7 years, 47 days	1 year, 31 days
44		Jagdish Singh Khehar	13 September 2011	4 January 2017	27 August 2017	5 years, 348 days	235 days
45		Dipak Misra	10 October 2011	28 August 2017	2 October 2018	6 years, 357 days	1 year, 35 days
46	Ranjan Gogoi	Ranjan Gogoi	23 April 2012	3 October 2018	17 November 2019	7 years, 208 days	1 year, 45 days
47		Sharad Arvind Bobde	12 April 2013	18 November 2019	23 April 2021	8 years, 11 days	1 year, 156 days
48		N. V. Ramana	17 February 2014	24 April 2021	26 August 2022	8 years, 190 days	1 year, 124 days
49		Uday Umesh Lalit	13 August 2014	27 August 2022	8 November 2022	8 years, 87 days	73 days
50		Dhananjaya Y. Chandrachud	13 May 2016	9 November 2022	10 November 2024	8 years, 181 days	2 years, 1 day
51		Sanjiv Khanna	18 January 2019	11 November 2024	13 May 2025	6 years, 115 days	183 days
52		Bhushan Ramkrishna Gavai	24 May 2019	14 May 2025	23 November 2025	6 years, 184 days	194 days

== Former judges including CJIs ==
Key

- ^{RES} Resigned
- ^{†} Died in office

Arranged according to seniority
Name	Image	Date of appointment	Date of retirement	Tenure length	Date of initial appointment as HC Judge	Tenure as HC Judge (Including as CJ)	Parent High Court	Nominated by CJI	Remarks
Harilal Jekisundas Kania (CJI)		28 January 1950	6 November 1951^{[†]}	1 year, 283 days	19 June 1933	13 years, 1 day	Bombay	--	
Saiyid Fazl Ali		28 January 1950	18 September 1951	1 year, 234 days	11 April 1928	18 years, 187 days	Patna	--	5th CJ of Patna HC
Mandakolathur Patanjali Sastri (CJI)		28 January 1950	3 January 1954	3 years, 341 days	15 March 1939	8 years, 266 days	Madras	--	
Mehr Chand Mahajan (CJI)		28 January 1950	22 December 1954	4 years, 329 days	27 September 1943	5 years, 5 days	Lahore	--	
Bijan Kumar Mukherjea (CJI)		28 January 1950	31 January 1956^{[RES]}	6 years, 4 days	8 July 1936	12 years, 98 days	Calcutta	--	
Sudhi Ranjan Das (CJI)		28 January 1950	30 September 1959	9 years, 246 days	1 December 1942	7 years, 50 days	Calcutta	--	2nd CJ of Punjab & Haryana HC
Nagapudi Chandrasekhara Aiyar		23 September 1950	24 January 1953	2 years, 124 days	16 July 1941	6 years, 194 days	Madras	1st CJI H. J. Kania	
Vivian Bose		5 March 1951	8 June 1956	5 years, 96 days	9 January 1936	15 years, 55 days	Nagpur	1st CJI H. J. Kania	CJ of erstwhile Nagpur HC
Ghulam Hasan		8 September 1952	5 November 1954^{[†]}	2 years, 59 days	25 July 1948	2 years, 344 days	Allahabad	2nd CJI M. Patanjali Sastri	
Natwarlal Harilal Bhagwati		8 September 1952	6 June 1959	6 years, 272 days	August 1944		Bombay	2nd CJI M. Patanjali Sastri	
Bachu Jagannadha Das		9 March 1953	26 July 1958	5 years, 140 days	26 July 1948	4 years, 226 days	Orissa	2nd CJI M. Patanjali Sastri	2nd CJ of Orissa HC
Tirunelveli Lakshmanasuri Venkatarama Iyer		4 January 1954	24 November 1958	4 years, 325 days	7 January 1951	2 years, 322 days	Madras	2nd CJI M. Patanjali Sastri	
Bhuvaneshwar Prasad Sinha (CJI)		3 December 1954	31 January 1964	9 years, 60 days	19 January 1943	11 years, 318 days	Patna	3rd CJI M. C. Mahajan	CJ of erstwhile Nagpur HC
Syed Jafar Imam		10 January 1955	31 January 1964^{[RES]}	9 years, 22 days	25 October 1943	11 years, 77 days	Patna	4th CJI B. K. Mukherjea	10th CJ of Patna HC
Sudhansu Kumar Das		30 April 1956	2 September 1963	7 years, 126 days	4 November 1944	11 years, 178 days	Patna	5th CJI Sudhi Ranjan Das	11th CJ of Patna HC
Parakulangara Govinda Menon		1 September 1956	16 October 1957^{[†]}	1 year, 46 days	28 July 1947	9 years, 35 days	Madras	5th CJI Sudhi Ranjan Das	
Jeevan Lal Kapur		14 January 1957	12 December 1962	5 years, 333 days	6 June 1949	7 years, 222 days	Punjab & Haryana	5th CJI Sudhi Ranjan Das	
Pralhad Balacharya Gajendragadkar (CJI)	Pralhad Balacharya Gajendragadkar	17 January 1957	15 March 1966	9 years, 58 days	6 March 1945	11 years, 317 days	Bombay	5th CJI Sudhi Ranjan Das	
Amal Kumar Sarkar (CJI)		4 March 1957	29 June 1966	9 years, 118 days	25 January 1949	8 years, 38 days	Calcutta	5th CJI Sudhi Ranjan Das	
Koka Subba Rao (CJI)		31 January 1958	11 April 1967^{[RES]}	9 years, 71 days	22 March 1948	9 years, 315 days	Madras	5th CJI Sudhi Ranjan Das	CJ of erstwhile Andhra Pradesh HC
Kailas Nath Wanchoo (CJI)		11 August 1958	24 February 1968	9 years, 198 days	17 February 1947	11 years, 175 days	Allahabad	5th CJI Sudhi Ranjan Das	2nd CJ of Rajasthan HC
Mohammad Hidayatullah (CJI)		1 December 1958	16 December 1970	12 years, 16 days	27 June 1946	12 years, 157 days	Nagpur	5th CJI Sudhi Ranjan Das	1st CJ of Madhya Pradesh HC
Kulada Charan Das Gupta		29 August 1959	2 January 1965	5 years, 132 days	June 1948		Calcutta	5th CJI Sudhi Ranjan Das	12th CJ of Calcutta HC
Jayantilal Chhotalal Shah (CJI)		12 October 1959	21 January 1971	11 years, 102 days	1 March 1949	10 years, 225 days	Bombay	5th CJI Sudhi Ranjan Das	
Raghubar Dayal		27 July 1960	25 October 1965	5 years, 91 days	22 July 1946	14 years, 5 days	Allahabad	6th CJI B. P. Sinha	
Narsimha Rajagopala Ayyangar		27 July 1960	14 December 1964	4 years, 141 days	16 November 1953	6 years, 29 days	Madras	6th CJI B. P. Sinha	
Janardan Raghunath Mudholkar		3 October 1960	3 July 1966^{[RES]}	5 years, 274 days	21 June 1948	12 years, 104 days	Nagpur	6th CJI B. P. Sinha	
Sarv Mittra Sikri (CJI)		3 February 1964	25 April 1973	9 years, 82 days	N/A	N/A	Bar Council	6th CJI B. P. Sinha	
Ranadhir Singh Bachawat		7 September 1964	31 July 1969	4 years, 328 days	23 January 1950	14 years, 228 days	Calcutta	7th CJI P. B. Gajendragadkar	
Vaidyanathier Ramaswami		4 January 1965	30 October 1969	4 years, 300 days	1 November 1947	17 years, 64 days	Patna	7th CJI P. B. Gajendragadkar	12th CJ of Patna HC
Penmetsa Satyanarayana Raju		20 October 1965	20 April 1966^{[†]}	183 days	1 January 1954	11 years, 292 days	Andhra Pradesh	7th CJI P. B. Gajendragadkar	CJ of erstwhile Andhra Pradesh HC
Jaishanker Manilal Shelat		24 February 1966	30 April 1973^{[RES]}	7 years, 66 days	6 January 1957	9 years, 49 days	Bombay	7th CJI P. B. Gajendragadkar	3rd CJ of Gujarat HC
Vashishtha Bhargava		8 August 1966	4 February 1971	4 years, 181 days	1 August 1949	17 years, 7 days	Allahabad	8th CJI A. K. Sarkar	17th CJ of Allahabad HC
Gopendra Krishna Mitter		29 August 1966	23 September 1971	5 years, 26 days	24 November 1952	13 years, 278 days	Calcutta	8th CJI A. K. Sarkar	
Chittur Anantakrishna Iyer Vaidyialingam		10 October 1966	29 June 1972	5 years, 264 days	27 March 1957	9 years, 197 days	Kerala	9th CJI K. Subba Rao	
Kowdoor Sadananda Hegde		17 July 1967	30 April 1973^{[RES]}	5 years, 288 days	26 August 1957	9 years, 325 days	Karnataka	10th CJI K. N. Wanchoo	1st CJ of Delhi HC
Amar Nath Grover		11 February 1968	31 May 1973^{[RES]}	5 years, 110 days	10 October 1957	10 years, 124 days	Punjab & Haryana	10th CJI K. N. Wanchoo	
Ajit Nath Ray (CJI)		1 August 1969	27 January 1977	7 years, 180 days	23 December 1957	11 years, 221 days	Calcutta	11th CJI M. Hidayatullah	
Pingle Jaganmohan Reddy		1 August 1969	22 January 1975	5 years, 175 days	16 February 1952	17 years, 166 days	Andhra Pradesh	11th CJI M. Hidayatullah	CJ of erstwhile Andhra Pradesh HC
Inder Dev Dua		1 August 1969	3 October 1972	3 years, 64 days	11 August 1958	10 years, 355 days	Punjab & Haryana	11th CJI M. Hidayatullah	2nd CJ of Delhi HC
Subimal Chandra Roy		19 July 1971	12 November 1971^{[†]}	117 days	N/A	N/A	Bar Council	13th CJI S. M. Sikri	
Devidas Ganpat Palekar		19 July 1971	3 September 1974	3 years, 47 days	14 October 1961	9 years, 278 days	Bombay	13th CJI S. M. Sikri	
Hans Raj Khanna		22 September 1971	11 March 1977^{[RES]}	5 years, 171 days	7 May 1962	9 years, 138 days	Punjab & Haryana	13th CJI S. M. Sikri	3rd CJ of Delhi HC
Kuttyil Kurien Mathew		4 October 1971	2 January 1976	4 years, 91 days	5 June 1962	9 years, 121 days	Kerala	13th CJI S. M. Sikri	
Mirza Hameedullah Beg (CJI)		10 December 1971	21 February 1978	6 years, 74 days	11 June 1963	8 years, 182 days	Allahabad	13th CJI S. M. Sikri	1st CJ of Himachal Pradesh HC
Surendra Narayan Dwivedi		14 August 1972	8 December 1974^{[†]}	2 years, 117 days	12 May 1959	13 years, 94 days	Allahabad	13th CJI S. M. Sikri	
Arun Kumar Mukherjea		14 August 1972	23 October 1973^{[†]}	1 year, 71 days	27 February 1962	10 years, 169 days	Calcutta	13th CJI S. M. Sikri	
Yeshwant Vishnu Chandrachud (CJI)		28 August 1972	11 July 1985	12 years, 318 days	19 March 1961	11 years, 162 days	Bombay	13th CJI S. M. Sikri	
Alwar Naicker Alagiriswami		17 October 1972	16 October 1975	3 years, 0 days	11 August 1966	6 years, 67 days	Madras	13th CJI S. M. Sikri	
Prafullachandra Natwarlal Bhagwati (CJI)		17 July 1973	20 December 1986	13 years, 157 days	21 July 1960	12 years, 361 days	Gujarat	14th CJI A. N. Ray	5th CJ of Gujarat HC
Vaidyanathapuram Rama Krishna Iyer		17 July 1973	14 November 1980	7 years, 121 days	12 July 1968	5 years, 5 days	Kerala	14th CJI A. N. Ray	
Parbati Kumar Goswami		10 September 1973	31 December 1977	4 years, 113 days	12 May 1967	6 years, 121 days	Gauhati	14th CJI A. N. Ray	9th CJ of Gauhati HC
Ranjit Singh Sarkaria		17 September 1973	15 January 1981	7 years, 121 days	12 June 1967	6 years, 97 days	Punjab & Haryana	14th CJI A. N. Ray	
Alak Chandra Gupta		2 September 1974	31 December 1981	7 years, 121 days	24 February 1964	10 years, 190 days	Calcutta	14th CJI A. N. Ray	
Nand Lall Untwalia		3 October 1974	31 July 1980	5 years, 303 days	2 January 1958	16 years, 274 days	Patna	14th CJI A. N. Ray	16th CJ of Patna HC
Syed Murtaza Fazl Ali		2 April 1975	20 August 1985^{[†]}	10 years, 141 days	9 April 1958	16 years, 358 days	Jammu & Kashmir	14th CJI A. N. Ray	8th CJ of Jammu & Kashmir HC
Prakash Narayan Shinghal		6 November 1975	14 October 1980	4 years, 344 days	21 June 1961	14 years, 138 days	Rajasthan	14th CJI A. N. Ray	9th CJ of Rajasthan HC
Jaswant Singh		23 January 1976	24 January 1979	3 years, 2 days	3 December 1967	8 years, 51 days	Jammu & Kashmir	14th CJI A. N. Ray	9th CJ of Jammu & Kashmir HC
Palapatti Sadaya Goundar Kailasam		3 January 1977	11 September 1980	3 years, 253 days	20 October 1960	16 years, 75 days	Madras	14th CJI A. N. Ray	17th CJ of Madras HC
Vidyaranya Dattatreya Tulzapurkar		30 September 1977	9 March 1986	8 years, 161 days	21 December 1963	13 years, 283 days	Bombay	15th CJI M. H. Beg	
Dhirajlal Ambelal Desai		30 September 1977	8 May 1985	7 years, 221 days	19 February 1968	9 years, 223 days	Gujarat	15th CJI M. H. Beg	
Raghunandan Swarup Pathak (CJI)		20 February 1978	18 June 1989^{[RES]}	11 years, 119 days	1 October 1962	15 years, 142 days	Allahabad	15th CJI M. H. Beg	2nd CJ of Himachal Pradesh HC
Anand Dev Koshal		17 July 1978	6 March 1982	3 years, 233 days	28 May 1968	10 years, 50 days	Punjab & Haryana	16th CJI Y. V. Chandrachud	11th CJ of Punjab & Haryana HC
Ontethupalli Chinnappa Reddy		17 July 1978	24 September 1987	9 years, 70 days	21 August 1967	10 years, 330 days	Andhra Pradesh	16th CJI Y. V. Chandrachud	
Ananda Prakash Sen		17 July 1978	19 September 1988	10 years, 65 days	7 November 1967	10 years, 252 days	Madhya Pradesh	16th CJI Y. V. Chandrachud	7th CJ of Madhya Pradesh HC
Engalaguppe Seetharamiah Venkataramiah (CJI)		8 March 1979	17 December 1989	10 years, 285 days	25 June 1970	8 years, 256 days	Karnataka	16th CJI Y. V. Chandrachud	
Baharul Islam		4 December 1980	12 January 1983^{[RES]}	2 years, 40 days	20 January 1972	8 years, 41 days	Gauhati	16th CJI Y. V. Chandrachud	13th CJ of Gauhati HC
Appajee Varadarajan		10 December 1980	16 August 1985	4 years, 250 days	15 February 1973	7 years, 299 days	Madras	16th CJI Y. V. Chandrachud	
Amarendra Nath Sen		28 January 1981	30 September 1985	4 years, 246 days	15 November 1965	15 years, 74 days	Calcutta	16th CJI Y. V. Chandrachud	18th CJ of Calcutta HC
Vettath Balakrishna Eradi		30 January 1981	18 June 1987	6 years, 140 days	5 April 1967	13 years, 300 days	Kerala	16th CJI Y. V. Chandrachud	9th CJ of Kerala HC
Ram Briksha Misra		30 January 1981	15 June 1986	5 years, 137 days	3 January 1968	13 years, 27 days	Allahabad	16th CJI Y. V. Chandrachud	
Dinshah Pirosha Madon		15 March 1983	6 April 1986	3 years, 23 days	25 September 1967	15 years, 171 days	Bombay	16th CJI Y. V. Chandrachud	21st CJ of Bombay HC
Sabyasachi Mukherjee (CJI)		15 March 1983	25 September 1990^{[†]}	7 years, 195 days	31 July 1968	14 years, 227 days	Calcutta	16th CJI Y. V. Chandrachud	
Manharlal Pranlal Thakkar		15 March 1983	3 November 1988	5 years, 234 days	2 July 1969	13 years, 256 days	Gujarat	16th CJI Y. V. Chandrachud	8th CJ of Gujarat HC
Ranganath Misra (CJI)		15 March 1983	24 November 1991	8 years, 255 days	4 July 1969	13 years, 254 days	Orissa	16th CJI Y. V. Chandrachud	10th CJ of Orissa HC
Vazhakkulangarayil Khalid		25 June 1984	30 June 1987	3 years, 6 days	7 March 1974	10 years, 110 days	Kerala	16th CJI Y. V. Chandrachud	13th CJ of Jammu & Kashmir HC
Goverdhan Lal Oza		29 October 1985	11 December 1989	4 years, 44 days	29 July 1968	17 years, 92 days	Madhya Pradesh	17th CJI P. N. Bhagwati	9th CJ of Madhya Pradesh HC
Bankim Chandra Ray		29 October 1985	31 October 1991	6 years, 3 days	10 June 1974	11 years, 141 days	Calcutta	17th CJI P. N. Bhagwati	
Murari Mohan Dutt		10 March 1986	29 October 1989	3 years, 234 days	18 September 1969	16 years, 173 days	Calcutta	17th CJI P. N. Bhagwati	
Kamal Narain Singh (CJI)		10 March 1986	12 December 1991	5 years, 278 days	25 August 1970	15 years, 197 days	Allahabad	17th CJI P. N. Bhagwati	
Sivasankar Natarajan		10 March 1986	28 October 1989	3 years, 233 days	15 February 1973	13 years, 23 days	Madras	17th CJI P. N. Bhagwati	
Madhukar Hiralal Kania (CJI)		1 May 1987	17 November 1992	5 years, 201 days	4 November 1969	17 years, 178 days	Bombay	18th CJI R. S. Pathak	24th CJ of Bombay HC
Kalmanje Jagannatha Shetty		1 May 1987	14 December 1991	4 years, 228 days	25 June 1970	16 years, 310 days	Karnataka	18th CJI R. S. Pathak	27th CJ of Allahabad HC
Lalit Mohan Sharma (CJI)		5 October 1987	11 February 1993	5 years, 130 days	12 April 1973	14 years, 176 days	Patna	18th CJI R. S. Pathak	
Manepalli Narayanarao Venkatachaliah (CJI)		5 October 1987	24 October 1994	7 years, 20 days	6 November 1975	11 years, 333 days	Karnataka	18th CJI R. S. Pathak	
Srinivasachar Ranganathan		5 October 1987	30 October 1992	5 years, 26 days	14 November 1977	9 years, 325 days	Delhi	18th CJI R. S. Pathak	
Narayan Dutta Ojha		18 January 1988	18 January 1991	3 years, 1 day	3 September 1971	16 years, 139 days	Allahabad	18th CJI R. S. Pathak	11th CJ of Madhya Pradesh HC
S. Ratnavel Pandian		14 December 1988	12 March 1994	5 years, 89 days	27 February 1974	14 years, 291 days	Madras	18th CJI R. S. Pathak	
Thamarappallil Kochu Thommen		14 December 1988	25 September 1993	4 years, 286 days	9 May 1975	13 years, 219 days	Kerala	18th CJI R. S. Pathak	
Aziz Mushabber Ahmadi (CJI)		14 December 1988	24 March 1997	8 years, 101 days	2 September 1976	12 years, 103 days	Gujarat	18th CJI R. S. Pathak	
Khagendra Nath Saika		14 December 1988	28 February 1991	2 years, 77 days	12 February 1979	9 years, 18 days	Gauhati	18th CJI R. S. Pathak	18th CJ of Gauhati HC
Kuldip Singh		14 December 1988	21 December 1996	8 years, 8 days	N/A	N/A	Bar Council	18th CJI R. S. Pathak	
Jagdish Sharan Verma (CJI)		3 June 1989	17 January 1998	8 years, 229 days	12 September 1972	16 years, 264 days	Madhya Pradesh	18th CJI R. S. Pathak	16th CJ of Rajasthan HC
Veeraswami Ramaswami		6 October 1989	14 February 1994	4 years, 132 days	31 January 1971	18 years, 248 days	Madras	19th CJI E. S. Venkataramiah	16th CJ of Punjab & Haryana HC
Parshuram Babaram Sawant		6 October 1989	29 June 1995	5 years, 267 days	29 March 1973	16 years, 191 days	Bombay	19th CJI E. S. Venkataramiah	
Narendra Mohan Kasliwal		6 October 1989	3 April 1993	3 years, 180 days	15 June 1978	11 years, 113 days	Rajasthan	19th CJI E. S. Venkataramiah	16th CJ of Himachal Pradesh HC
Madan Mohan Punchhi (CJI)		6 October 1989	9 October 1998	9 years, 4 days	24 October 1979	9 years, 347 days	Punjab & Haryana	19th CJI E. S. Venkataramiah	
Katikithala Ramaswamy		6 October 1989	12 July 1997	7 years, 280 days	29 September 1982	7 years, 7 days	Andhra Pradesh	19th CJI E. S. Venkataramiah	
Fathima Beevi		6 October 1989	29 April 1992	2 years, 207 days	4 August 1983	5 years, 264 days	Kerala	19th CJI E. S. Venkataramiah	
K. Jayachandra Reddy		11 January 1990	14 July 1994	4 years, 185 days	7 March 1975	14 years, 310 days	Andhra Pradesh	20th CJI Sabyasachi Mukherjee	
Suresh Chandra Agrawal		11 January 1990	4 September 1998	8 years, 237 days	15 June 1978	11 years, 210 days	Rajasthan	20th CJI Sabyasachi Mukherjee	
Ram Manohar Sahai		11 January 1990	24 June 1995	5 years, 165 days	27 January 1976	13 years, 349 days	Allahabad	20th CJI Sabyasachi Mukherjee	
Yogeshwar Dayal		22 March 1991	2 August 1994^{[†]}	3 years, 134 days	28 February 1974	17 years, 22 days	Delhi	21st CJI Ranganath Misra	13th CJ of Delhi HC
Shanmughasundaram Mohan		7 October 1991	10 February 1995	3 years, 127 days	27 February 1974	17 years, 222 days	Madras	21st CJI Ranganath Misra	12th CJ of Karnataka HC
Benjaram Pranaya Jeevan Reddy		7 October 1991	13 March 1997	5 years, 158 days	17 July 1975	16 years, 82 days	Andhra Pradesh	21st CJI Ranganath Misra	31st CJ of Allahabad HC
Ganendra Narayan Ray		7 October 1991	30 April 1998	6 years, 206 days	23 December 1976	14 years, 288 days	Calcutta	21st CJI Ranganath Misra	11th CJ of Gujarat HC
Adarsh Sein Anand (CJI)		18 November 1991	31 October 2001	9 years, 348 days	26 May 1975	16 years, 176 days	Jammu & Kashmir	21st CJI Ranganath Misra	24th CJ of Madras HC
Radha Charan Patnaik		3 December 1991	30 May 1992^{[†]}	180 days	18 September 1981	10 years, 76 days	Orissa	21st CJI Ranganath Misra	
Nagendra Prasad Singh		15 June 1992	24 December 1996	4 years, 193 days	12 April 1973	19 years, 64 days	Patna	23rd CJI M. H Kania	26th CJ of Calcutta HC
Sam Piroj Bharucha (CJI)		1 July 1992	5 May 2002	9 years, 309 days	19 September 1977	14 years, 286 days	Bombay	23rd CJI M. H Kania	13th CJ of Karnataka HC
Nanje Gowda Venkatachala		1 July 1992	2 July 1995	3 years, 2 days	28 November 1977	14 years, 216 days	Karnataka	23rd CJI M. H Kania	
Manoj Kumar Mukherjee		14 December 1993	30 November 1998	4 years, 352 days	17 June 1977	16 years, 180 days	Calcutta	25th CJI M. N. Venkatachaliah	27th CJ of Bombay HC
Faizanuddin		14 December 1993	4 February 1997	3 years, 53 days	27 November 1978	15 years, 17 days	Madhya Pradesh	25th CJI M. N. Venkatachaliah	
Banwari Lal Hansaria		14 December 1993	24 December 1996	3 years, 11 days	12 February 1979	14 years, 305 days	Gauhati	25th CJI M. N. Venkatachaliah	13th CJ of Orissa HC
Suhas Chandra Sen		11 June 1994	20 December 1997	3 years, 193 days	23 November 1981	12 years, 200 days	Calcutta	25th CJI M. N. Venkatachaliah	
Krishnaswami Sundara Paripoornan		11 June 1994	11 June 1997	3 years, 1 day	23 December 1982	11 years, 170 days	Kerala	25th CJI M. N. Venkatachaliah	25th CJ of Patna HC
Shailesh Bhadrayulal Majumdar		19 September 1994	19 August 2000	5 years, 336 days	3 October 1978	15 years, 351 days	Gujarat	25th CJI M. N. Venkatachaliah	14th CJ of Karnataka HC
Sujata Manohar		8 November 1994	27 August 1999	4 years, 293 days	23 January 1978	16 years, 289 days	Bombay	26th CJI A. M. Ahmadi	14th CJ of Kerala HC
Girish Thakorlal Nanavati		6 March 1995	16 February 2000	4 years, 348 days	19 July 1979	15 years, 230 days	Gujarat	26th CJI A. M. Ahmadi	15th CJ of Karnataka HC
Saiyed Saghir Ahmad		6 March 1995	30 June 2000	5 years, 117 days	2 November 1981	13 years, 124 days	Allahabad	26th CJI A. M. Ahmadi	17th CJ of Jammu & Kashmir HC
Konduswami Venkataswamy		6 March 1995	18 September 1999	4 years, 197 days	24 July 1983	11 years, 225 days	Madras	26th CJI A. M. Ahmadi	26th CJ of Patna HC
Bhupinder Nath Kirpal (CJI)		11 September 1995	7 November 2002	7 years, 58 days	20 November 1979	15 years, 295 days	Delhi	26th CJI A. M. Ahmadi	13th CJ of Gujarat HC
Gopal Ballav Pattanaik (CJI)		11 September 1995	18 December 2002	7 years, 99 days	1 June 1983	12 years, 102 days	Orissa	26th CJI A. M. Ahmadi	27th CJ of Patna HC
Sudhakar Panditrao Kurdukar		29 March 1996	15 January 2000	3 years, 293 days	25 April 1978	17 years, 339 days	Bombay	26th CJI A. M. Ahmadi	22nd CJ of Punjab & Haryana HC
Thomas Kallupurackal Thomas		29 March 1996	30 January 2002	5 years, 308 days	12 August 1985	10 years, 230 days	Kerala	26th CJI A. M. Ahmadi	
Mamidanna Jagannadha Rao		21 March 1997	1 December 2000	3 years, 256 days	29 November 1982	14 years, 112 days	Andhra Pradesh	26th CJI A. M. Ahmadi	17th CJ of Delhi HC
Vishweshwar Nath Khare (CJI)		21 March 1997	1 May 2004	7 years, 42 days	25 June 1983	13 years, 269 days	Allahabad	26th CJI A. M. Ahmadi	29th CJ of Calcutta HC
Devinder Pratap Wadhwa		21 March 1997	4 May 2000	3 years, 45 days	12 August 1983	13 years, 221 days	Delhi	26th CJI A. M. Ahmadi	28th CJ of Patna HC
Madhavachari Srinivasan		25 September 1997	25 February 2000^{[†]}	2 years, 154 days	2 June 1986	10 years, 292 days	Madras	27th CJI J. S. Verma	13th CJ of Himachal Pradesh HC
Sanjeevalu Rajendra Babu (CJI)		25 September 1997	31 May 2004	6 years, 250 days	19 February 1988	9 years, 218 days	Karnataka	27th CJI J. S. Verma	
Ajay Prakash Misra		4 December 1997	31 August 2001	3 years, 271 days	24 May 1984	13 years, 194 days	Allahabad	27th CJI J. S. Verma	18th CJ of Delhi HC
Syed Shah Mohammed Quadri		4 December 1997	5 April 2003	5 years, 123 days	11 July 1986	11 years, 146 days	Andhra Pradesh	27th CJI J. S. Verma	
Manharlal Bhikhalal Shah		9 December 1998	24 September 2003	4 years, 290 days	28 January 1983	15 years, 315 days	Gujarat	29th CJI A. S. Anand	30th CJ of Bombay HC
Deba Priya Mohapatra		9 December 1998	2 August 2002	3 years, 237 days	18 November 1983	15 years, 21 days	Orissa	29th CJI A. S. Anand	35th CJ of Allahabad HC
Umesh Chandra Banerjee		9 December 1998	17 November 2002	3 years, 344 days	9 January 1984	14 years, 334 days	Calcutta	29th CJI A. S. Anand	CJ of erstwhile Andhra Pradesh HC
Ramesh Chandra Lahoti (CJI)		9 December 1998	31 October 2005	6 years, 327 days	3 May 1988	10 years, 220 days	Madhya Pradesh	29th CJI A. S. Anand	
N. Santosh Hegde		8 January 1999	16 June 2005	6 years, 160 days	N/A	N/A	Bar Council	29th CJI A. S. Anand	
Ram Prakash Sethi		8 January 1999	6 July 2002	3 years, 180 days	30 May 1986	12 years, 223 days	Jammu & Kashmir	29th CJI A. S. Anand	18th CJ of Karnataka HC
Sailendu Nath Phukan		28 January 1999	31 March 2002	3 years, 63 days	11 October 1985	14 years, 109 days	Gauhati	29th CJI A. S. Anand	16th CJ of Orissa HC
Yogesh Kumar Sabharwal (CJI)		28 January 2000	13 January 2007	6 years, 351 days	17 November 1986	13 years, 72 days	Delhi	29th CJI A. S. Anand	31st CJ of Bombay HC
Doraiswamy Raju		28 January 2000	1 July 2004	4 years, 156 days	14 January 1990	10 years, 14 days	Madras	29th CJI A. S. Anand	15th CJ of Himachal Pradesh HC
Ruma Pal		28 January 2000	3 June 2006	6 years, 127 days	6 August 1990	9 years, 175 days	Calcutta	29th CJI A. S. Anand	
Sam Nariman Variava		15 March 2000	7 November 2005	5 years, 238 days	21 November 1986	13 years, 115 days	Bombay	29th CJI A. S. Anand	19th CJ of Delhi HC
Shivaraj Virupanna Patil		15 March 2000	11 January 2005	4 years, 303 days	29 March 1990	9 years, 352 days	Karnataka	29th CJI A. S. Anand	21st CJ of Rajasthan HC
Konakuppakatil Gopinathan Balakrishnan (CJI)		8 June 2000	12 May 2010	9 years, 339 days	26 September 1985	14 years, 256 days	Kerala	29th CJI A. S. Anand	29th CJ of Madras HC
Brijesh Kumar		19 October 2000	9 June 2004	3 years, 235 days	24 May 1984	16 years, 148 days	Allahabad	29th CJI A. S. Anand	25th CJ of Gauhati HC
Biswanath Agrawal		19 October 2000	15 October 2009	8 years, 362 days	17 November 1986	13 years, 337 days	Patna	29th CJI A. S. Anand	17th CJ of Orissa HC
Ponaka Venkatarama Reddi		17 August 2001	9 August 2005	3 years, 358 days	16 March 1990	11 years, 154 days	Andhra Pradesh	29th CJI A. S. Anand	20th CJ of Karnataka HC
Ashok Bhan		17 August 2001	2 October 2008	7 years, 108 days	15 June 1990	11 years, 63 days	Punjab & Haryana	29th CJI A. S. Anand	
Arijit Pasayat		19 October 2001	10 May 2009	7 years, 204 days	20 March 1989	12 years, 213 days	Orissa	29th CJI A. S. Anand	20th CJ of Delhi HC
Bisheshwar Prasad Singh		14 December 2001	8 July 2007	5 years, 207 days	9 March 1987	14 years, 280 days	Patna	30th CJI S. P. Bharucha	32nd CJ of Bombay HC
Devdatta Madhav Dharmadhikari		5 March 2002	13 August 2005	3 years, 162 days	24 March 1989	12 years, 346 days	Madhya Pradesh	30th CJI S. P. Bharucha	17th CJ of Gujarat HC
Hotoi Khetoho Sema		9 April 2002	1 June 2008	6 years, 54 days	24 May 1989	12 years, 320 days	Gauhati	30th CJI S. P. Bharucha	21st CJ of Jammu & Kashmir HC
Satyabrata Sinha		3 October 2002	8 August 2009	6 years, 310 days	9 March 1987	15 years, 208 days	Patna	31st CJI B. N. Kirpal	21st CJ of Delhi HC
Arun Kumar		3 October 2002	11 April 2006	5 years, 191 days	13 July 1990	12 years, 82 days	Delhi	31st CJI B. N. Kirpal	23rd CJ of Rajasthan HC
Bellur Narayanswamy Srikrishna		3 October 2002	20 May 2006	5 years, 230 days	30 July 1990	12 years, 65 days	Bombay	31st CJI B. N. Kirpal	21st CJ of Kerala HC
Arunachalam R. Lakshmanan		20 December 2002	21 March 2007	4 years, 92 days	14 June 1990	12 years, 189 days	Madras	32nd CJI G. B. Pattanaik	22nd CJ of Rajasthan HC
Govind Prasad Mathur		20 December 2002	19 January 2008	5 years, 31 days	6 July 1990	12 years, 167 days	Allahabad	32nd CJI G. B. Pattanaik	
Sarosh Homi Kapadia (CJI)		18 December 2003	28 September 2012	8 years, 286 days	8 October 1991	12 years, 71 days	Bombay	33rd CJI V. N. Khare	2nd CJ of Uttarakhand HC
Ashok Kumar Mathur		7 June 2004	7 August 2008	4 years, 62 days	13 July 1985	18 years, 330 days	Rajasthan	34th CJI S. Rajendra Babu	31st CJ of Calcutta HC
Chunilal Karsandas Thakker		7 June 2004	10 November 2008	4 years, 157 days	21 June 1990	13 years, 352 days	Gujarat	34th CJI S. Rajendra Babu	33rd CJ of Bombay HC
Tarun Chatterjee		27 August 2004	14 January 2010	5 years, 141 days	6 August 1990	14 years, 21 days	Calcutta	35th CJI R. C. Lahoti	38th CJ of Allahabad HC
Perubhemba Krishna Ayer Balasubramanyan		27 August 2004	27 August 2007	3 years, 1 day	4 June 1992	12 years, 84 days	Kerala	35th CJI R. C. Lahoti	2nd CJ of Jharkhand HC
Prakash Prabhakar Naolekar		27 August 2004	29 June 2008	3 years, 308 days	15 June 1992	12 years, 73 days	Madhya Pradesh	35th CJI R. C. Lahoti	28th CJ of Gauhati HC
Altamas Kabir (CJI)		9 September 2005	18 July 2013	7 years, 313 days	6 August 1990	15 years, 34 days	Calcutta	35th CJI R. C. Lahoti	3rd CJ of Jharkhand HC
Raju Varadarajulu Raveendran		9 September 2005	15 October 2011	6 years, 37 days	22 February 1993	12 years, 199 days	Karnataka	35th CJI R. C. Lahoti	18th CJ of Madhya Pradesh HC
Dalveer Bhandari		28 October 2005	27 April 2012^{[RES]}	6 years, 183 days	19 March 1991	14 years, 223 days	Delhi	35th CJI R. C. Lahoti	34th CJ of Bombay HC
Lokeshwar Singh Panta		3 February 2006	23 September 2009	3 years, 80 days	20 August 1991	14 years, 167 days	Himachal Pradesh	36th CJI Y. K. Sabharwal	
Devinder Kumar Jain		10 April 2006	24 January 2013	6 years, 290 days	19 March 1991	15 years, 22 days	Delhi	36th CJI Y. K. Sabharwal	26th CJ of Punjab & Haryana HC
Markandey Katju		10 April 2006	19 September 2011	5 years, 163 days	30 November 1991	14 years, 131 days	Allahabad	36th CJI Y. K. Sabharwal	23rd CJ of Delhi HC
Harjit Singh Bedi		12 January 2007	4 September 2011	4 years, 236 days	15 March 1991	15 years, 303 days	Punjab & Haryana	36th CJI Y. K. Sabharwal	36th CJ of Bombay HC
Vikas Sridhar Sirpurkar		12 January 2007	21 August 2011	4 years, 228 days	9 November 1992	14 years, 64 days	Bombay	36th CJI Y. K. Sabharwal	32nd CJ of Calcutta HC
Buchireddy Sudershan Reddy		12 January 2007	7 July 2011	4 years, 177 days	2 May 1995	11 years, 255 days	Andhra Pradesh	36th CJI Y. K. Sabharwal	30th CJ of Gauhati HC
Palanisamy Sathasivam (CJI)		21 August 2007	26 April 2014	6 years, 249 days	8 August 1996	11 years, 13 days	Madras	37th CJI K. G. Balakrishnan	
Ganpat Singh Singhvi		12 November 2007	12 December 2013	6 years, 31 days	20 July 1990	17 years, 115 days	Rajasthan	37th CJI K. G. Balakrishnan	CJ of erstwhile Andhra Pradesh HC
Aftab Alam		12 November 2007	18 April 2013	5 years, 158 days	27 July 1990	17 years, 108 days	Patna	37th CJI K. G. Balakrishnan	
Jagdish Madhurlal Panchal		12 November 2007	5 October 2011	3 years, 328 days	22 November 1990	16 years, 355 days	Gujarat	37th CJI K. G. Balakrishnan	26th CJ of Rajasthan HC
Mukundakam Sharma		9 April 2008	17 September 2011	3 years, 162 days	10 January 1994	14 years, 90 days	Gauhati	37th CJI K. G. Balakrishnan	24th CJ of Delhi HC
Cyriac Joseph		7 July 2008	27 January 2012	3 years, 205 days	6 July 1994	14 years, 1 day	Kerala	37th CJI K. G. Balakrishnan	23rd CJ of Karnataka HC
Asok Kumar Ganguly		17 December 2008	3 February 2012	3 years, 49 days	10 January 1994	14 years, 342 days	Calcutta	37th CJI K. G. Balakrishnan	34th CJ of Madras HC
Rajendra Mal Lodha (CJI)		17 December 2008	27 September 2014	5 years, 285 days	31 January 1994	14 years, 321 days	Rajasthan	37th CJI K. G. Balakrishnan	33rd CJ of Patna HC
Handyala Lakshminarayanaswamy Dattu (CJI)		17 December 2008	2 December 2015	6 years, 351 days	18 December 1995	12 years, 365 days	Karnataka	37th CJI K. G. Balakrishnan	27th CJ of Kerala HC
Deepak Verma		11 May 2009	28 August 2012	3 years, 110 days	15 December 1994	14 years, 147 days	Madhya Pradesh	37th CJI K. G. Balakrishnan	28th CJ of Rajasthan HC
Balbir Singh Chauhan		11 May 2009	1 July 2014	5 years, 52 days	5 April 1995	14 years, 36 days	Allahabad	37th CJI K. G. Balakrishnan	22nd CJ of Orissa HC
Ananga Kumar Patnaik		17 November 2009	2 June 2014	4 years, 198 days	13 January 1994	15 years, 308 days	Orissa	37th CJI K. G. Balakrishnan	19th CJ of Madhya Pradesh HC
Tirath Singh Thakur (CJI)		17 November 2009	3 January 2017	7 years, 48 days	16 February 1994	15 years, 274 days	Jammu & Kashmir	37th CJI K. G. Balakrishnan	28th CJ of Punjab & Haryana HC
Kalavamkodath Sivasankara Panicker Radhakrishnan		17 November 2009	14 May 2014	4 years, 179 days	17 May 1995	14 years, 184 days	Kerala	37th CJI K. G. Balakrishnan	21st CJ of Gujarat HC
Surinder Singh Nijjar		17 November 2009	6 June 2014	4 years, 202 days	8 April 1996	13 years, 223 days	Punjab & Haryana	37th CJI K. G. Balakrishnan	33rd CJ of Calcutta HC
Swatanter Kumar		18 December 2009	19 December 2012	3 years, 2 days	10 November 1994	15 years, 38 days	Delhi	37th CJI K. G. Balakrishnan	37th CJ of Bombay HC
Chandramauli Kumar Prasad		8 February 2010	14 July 2014	4 years, 157 days	8 November 1994	15 years, 92 days	Patna	37th CJI K. G. Balakrishnan	41st CJ of Allahabad HC
Hemant Laxman Gokhale		30 April 2010	10 March 2014	3 years, 315 days	20 January 1994	16 years, 100 days	Bombay	37th CJI K. G. Balakrishnan	35th CJ of Madras HC
Gyan Sudha Misra		30 April 2010	27 April 2014	3 years, 363 days	16 March 1994	16 years, 45 days	Patna	37th CJI K. G. Balakrishnan	6th CJ of Jharkhand HC
Anil Ramesh Dave		30 April 2010	18 November 2016	6 years, 203 days	18 September 1995	14 years, 224 days	Gujarat	37th CJI K. G. Balakrishnan	38th CJ of Bombay HC
Sudhanshu Joshi Mukhopadhaya		13 September 2011	14 March 2015	3 years, 183 days	8 November 1994	16 years, 309 days	Patna	38th CJI S. H. Kapadia	22nd CJ of Gujarat HC
Ranjana Prakash Desai		13 September 2011	29 October 2014	3 years, 47 days	15 April 1996	15 years, 151 days	Bombay	38th CJI S. H. Kapadia	
Jagdish Singh Khehar (CJI)		13 September 2011	27 August 2017	5 years, 349 days	8 February 1999	12 years, 217 days	Punjab & Haryana	38th CJI S. H. Kapadia	25th CJ of Karnataka HC
Dipak Misra (CJI)	Dipak Misra	10 October 2011	2 October 2018	6 years, 358 days	17 January 1996	15 years, 266 days	Orissa	38th CJI S. H. Kapadia	26th CJ of Delhi HC
Jasti Chelameswar		10 October 2011	22 June 2018	6 years, 256 days	23 June 1997	14 years, 109 days	Andhra Pradesh	38th CJI S. H. Kapadia	29th CJ of Kerala HC
Fakkir Mohamed Ibrahim Kalifulla		2 April 2012	22 July 2016	4 years, 112 days	2 March 2000	12 years, 31 days	Madras	38th CJI S. H. Kapadia	29th CJ of Jammu & Kashmir HC
Ranjan Gogoi (CJI)	Ranjan Gogoi	23 April 2012	17 November 2019	7 years, 209 days	28 February 2001	11 years, 55 days	Gauhati	38th CJI S. H. Kapadia	30th CJ of Punjab & Haryana HC
Madan Lokur		4 June 2012	30 December 2018	6 years, 210 days	19 February 1999	13 years, 106 days	Delhi	38th CJI S. H. Kapadia	33rd CJ of Gauhati HC
Mokhtarajama Yusuf Eqbal		24 December 2012	12 February 2016	3 years, 51 days	9 May 1996	16 years, 229 days	Jharkhand	39th CJI Altamas Kabir	36th CJ of Madras HC
Venkate Gopala Gowda		24 December 2012	5 October 2016	3 years, 287 days	11 June 1997	15 years, 196 days	Karnataka	39th CJI Altamas Kabir	24th CJ of Orissa HC
Vikramajit Sen		24 December 2012	30 December 2015	3 years, 7 days	7 July 1999	13 years, 170 days	Delhi	39th CJI Altamas Kabir	26th CJ of Karnataka HC
Pinaki Chandra Ghose		8 March 2013	27 May 2017	4 years, 81 days	17 July 1997	15 years, 234 days	Calcutta	39th CJI Altamas Kabir	CJ of erstwhile Andhra Pradesh HC
Kurian Joseph		8 March 2013	29 November 2018	5 years, 267 days	12 July 2000	12 years, 239 days	Kerala	39th CJI Altamas Kabir	20th CJ of Himachal Pradesh HC
Arjan Kumar Sikri		12 April 2013	6 March 2019	5 years, 329 days	7 July 1999	13 years, 279 days	Delhi	39th CJI Altamas Kabir	31st CJ of Punjab & Haryana HC
Sharad Arvind Bobde (CJI)		12 April 2013	23 April 2021	8 years, 12 days	29 March 2000	13 years, 14 days	Bombay	39th CJI Altamas Kabir	21st CJ of Madhya Pradesh HC
Shiva Kirti Singh		19 September 2013	11 November 2016	3 years, 54 days	29 December 1998	14 years, 264 days	Patna	40th CJI P. Sathasivam	44th CJ of Allahabad HC
Chokkalingam Nagappan		19 September 2013	3 October 2016	3 years, 15 days	27 September 2000	12 years, 357 days	Madras	40th CJI P. Sathasivam	25th CJ of Orissa HC
Rajesh Kumar Agrawal		17 February 2014	4 May 2018	4 years, 77 days	5 February 1999	15 years, 12 days	Allahabad	40th CJI P. Sathasivam	37th CJ of Madras HC
Nuthalapati Venkata Ramana (CJI)		17 February 2014	26 August 2022	8 years, 191 days	27 June 2000	13 years, 235 days	Andhra Pradesh	40th CJI P. Sathasivam	28th CJ of Delhi HC
Arun Kumar Mishra		7 July 2014	2 September 2020	6 years, 58 days	25 October 1999	14 years, 255 days	Madhya Pradesh	41st CJI R. M. Lodha	36th CJ of Calcutta HC
Adarsh Kumar Goel		7 July 2014	6 July 2018	4 years, 0 days	2 July 2001	13 years, 5 days	Punjab & Haryana	41st CJI R. M. Lodha	26th CJ of Orissa HC
Rohinton Fali Nariman		7 July 2014	12 August 2021	7 years, 37 days	N/A	N/A	Bar Council	41st CJI R. M. Lodha	
Abhay Manohar Sapre		13 August 2014	27 August 2019	5 years, 15 days	25 October 1999	14 years, 292 days	Madhya Pradesh	41st CJI R. M. Lodha	33rd CJ of Gauhati HC
R. Banumathi		13 August 2014	19 July 2020	5 years, 342 days	3 April 2003	11 years, 132 days	Madras	41st CJI R. M. Lodha	9th CJ of Jharkhand HC
Prafulla Chandra Pant		13 August 2014	29 August 2017	3 years, 17 days	29 June 2004	10 years, 45 days	Uttarakhand	41st CJI R. M. Lodha	2nd CJ of Meghalaya HC
Uday Umesh Lalit (CJI)		13 August 2014	8 November 2022	8 years, 88 days	N/A	N/A	Bar Council	41st CJI R. M. Lodha	
Amitava Roy		27 February 2015	1 March 2018	3 years, 3 days	4 February 2002	13 years, 23 days	Gauhati	42nd CJI H. L. Dattu	27tht CJ of Orissa HC
Ajay Manikrao Khanwilkar		13 May 2016	29 July 2022	6 years, 78 days	29 March 2000	16 years, 45 days	Bombay	43rd CJI T. S. Thakur	22nd CJ of Madhya Pradesh HC
Dhananjaya Yeshwant Chandrachud (CJI)		13 May 2016	10 November 2024	8 years, 182 days	29 March 2000	16 years, 45 days	Bombay	43rd CJI T. S. Thakur	45th CJ of Allahabad HC
Ashok Bhushan		13 May 2016	4 July 2021	5 years, 53 days	24 April 2001	15 years, 19 days	Allahabad	43rd CJI T. S. Thakur	31st CJ of Kerala HC
Lavu Nageswara Rao		13 May 2016	7 June 2022	6 years, 26 days	N/A	N/A	Bar Council	43rd CJI T. S. Thakur	
Sanjay Kishan Kaul		17 February 2017	25 December 2023	6 years, 312 days	3 May 2001	15 years, 290 days	Delhi	44th CJI J. S. Khehar	38th CJ of Madras HC
Mohan Shantanagoudar		17 February 2017	24 April 2021^{[†]}	4 years, 67 days	12 May 2003	13 years, 281 days	Karnataka	44th CJI J. S. Khehar	32nd CJ of Kerala HC
Syed Abdul Nazeer		17 February 2017	4 January 2023	5 years, 322 days	12 May 2003	13 years, 281 days	Karnataka	44th CJI J. S. Khehar	
Navin Sinha		17 February 2017	18 August 2021	4 years, 183 days	11 February 2004	13 years, 6 days	Patna	44th CJI J. S. Khehar	34th CJ of Rajasthan HC
Deepak Gupta		17 February 2017	6 May 2020	3 years, 80 days	4 October 2004	12 years, 136 days	Himachal Pradesh	44th CJI J. S. Khehar	10th CJ of Chhattisgarh HC
Indu Malhotra		27 April 2018	13 March 2021	2 years, 321 days	N/A	N/A	Bar Council	45th CJI Dipak Misra	
Indira Banerjee		7 August 2018	23 September 2022	4 years, 48 days	5 February 2002	16 years, 183 days	Calcutta	45th CJI Dipak Misra	39th CJ of Madras HC
Vineet Saran		7 August 2018	10 May 2022	3 years, 277 days	14 February 2002	16 years, 174 days	Allahabad	45th CJI Dipak Misra	29th CJ of Orissa HC
Kuttiyil Mathew Joseph		7 August 2018	16 June 2023	4 years, 314 days	14 October 2004	13 years, 297 days	Kerala	45th CJI Dipak Misra	9th CJ of Uttarakhand HC
Hemant Gupta		2 November 2018	16 October 2022	3 years, 349 days	2 July 2002	16 years, 123 days	Punjab & Haryana	46th CJI Ranjan Gogoi	23rd CJ of Madhya Pradesh HC
Ramayyagari Subhash Reddy		2 November 2018	4 January 2022	3 years, 64 days	2 December 2002	15 years, 335 days	Andhra Pradesh	46th CJI Ranjan Gogoi	24th CJ of Gujarat HC
Mukesh Rasikbhai Shah		2 November 2018	15 May 2023	4 years, 195 days	7 March 2004	14 years, 240 days	Gujarat	46th CJI Ranjan Gogoi	41st CJ of Patna HC
Ajay Rastogi		2 November 2018	17 June 2023	4 years, 228 days	2 September 2004	14 years, 61 days	Rajasthan	46th CJI Ranjan Gogoi	3rd CJ of Tripura HC
Dinesh Maheshwari		18 January 2019	14 May 2023	4 years, 117 days	2 September 2004	14 years, 138 days	Rajasthan	46th CJI Ranjan Gogoi	29th CJ of Karnataka HC
Sanjiv Khanna (CJI)		18 January 2019	13 May 2025	6 years, 116 days	24 June 2005	13 years, 208 days	Delhi	46th CJI Ranjan Gogoi	
Bhushan Ramkrishna Gavai (CJI)		24 May 2019	23 November 2025	6 years, 184 days	14 November 2003	15 years, 191 days	Bombay	46th CJI Ranjan Gogoi	
Aniruddha Bose		24 May 2019	10 April 2024	4 years, 323 days	19 January 2004	15 years, 125 days	Calcutta	46th CJI Ranjan Gogoi	12th CJ of Jharkhand HC
Ajjikuttira Somaiah Bopanna		24 May 2019	19 May 2024	4 years, 362 days	6 January 2006	13 years, 138 days	Karnataka	46th CJI Ranjan Gogoi	37th CJ of Gauhati HC
Krishna Murari		23 September 2019	8 July 2023	3 years, 289 days	7 January 2004	15 years, 259 days	Allahabad	46th CJI Ranjan Gogoi	34th CJ of Punjab & Haryana HC
Shripathi Ravindra Bhat		23 September 2019	20 October 2023	4 years, 28 days	16 July 2004	15 years, 69 days	Delhi	46th CJI Ranjan Gogoi	36th CJ of Rajasthan HC
V. Ramasubramanian		23 September 2019	29 June 2023	3 years, 280 days	31 July 2006	13 years, 54 days	Madras	46th CJI Ranjan Gogoi	24th CJ of Himachal Pradesh HC
Hrishikesh Roy		23 September 2019	31 January 2025	5 years, 251 days	12 October 2006	12 years, 346 days	Gauhati	46th CJI Ranjan Gogoi	35th CJ of Kerala HC
Abhay Shreeniwas Oka		31 August 2021	24 May 2025	3 years, 267 days	29 August 2003	18 years, 2 days	Bombay	48th CJI N. V. Ramana	30th CJ of Karnataka HC
Jitendra Kumar Maheshwari		31 August 2021	28 June 2026	4 years, 302 days	25 November 2005	15 years, 279 days	Madhya Pradesh	48th CJI N. V. Ramana	22nd CJ of Sikkim HC
Hima Kohli		31 August 2021	1 September 2024	3 years, 2 days	29 May 2006	15 years, 94 days	Delhi	48th CJI N. V. Ramana	3rd CJ of Telangana HC
Chudalayil Thevan Ravikumar		31 August 2021	5 January 2025	3 years, 128 days	5 January 2009	12 years, 238 days	Kerala	48th CJI N. V. Ramana	
Bela Trivedi		31 August 2021	9 June 2025	3 years, 283 days	17 February 2011	10 years, 195 days	Gujarat	48th CJI N. V. Ramana	
Sudhanshu Dhulia		9 May 2022	9 August 2025	3 years, 93 days	1 November 2008	13 years, 189 days	Uttarakhand	48th CJI N. V. Ramana	39th CJ of Gauhati HC
Pankaj Mithal		6 February 2023	16 June 2026	3 years, 131 days	7 July 2006	16 years, 214 days	Allahabad	50th CJI D. Y. Chandrachud	40th CJ of Rajasthan HC
Sanjay Karol		6 February 2023	22 August 2026	3 years, 198 days	8 March 2007	15 years, 335 days	Himachal Pradesh	50th CJI D. Y. Chandrachud	43rd CJ of Patna HC
Rajesh Bindal		13 February 2023	15 April 2026	3 years, 63 days	22 March 2006	16 years, 328 days	Punjab & Haryana	50th CJI D. Y. Chandrachud	49th CJ of Allahabad HC

== See also ==
- List of chief justices of India
- List of sitting judges of the Supreme Court of India
- List of female judges of the Supreme Court of India
