= Delimitation Commission of India =

Indian commission

Commission overview
- Formed: 1951 (75 years ago)
- Jurisdiction: India
- Headquarters: New Delhi, India
- Commission executive: Chairperson
- Parent department: Government of India

The Delimitation Commission of India is a commission established by the Government of India under the provisions of the Delimitation Commission Act, tasked with redrawing the boundaries of legislative assembly and Lok Sabha constituencies based on the last census. The present delimitation of constituencies is based on the 2001 census under the provisions of the Delimitation Act, 2002.

The Commission is an independent body whose orders cannot be challenged in any court of law. The orders are laid before the Lok Sabha and the respective State Legislative Assemblies. However, modifications are not permitted. The next delimitation cannot be held before 2026.

== History ==
Delimitation commissions have been set up in India four times in the past — 1952, 1962, 1972 and 2002 — under Delimitation Commission Acts of 1952, 1962, 1972 and 2002.

The central government had suspended delimitation in 1976 until after the 2001 census so that states' family planning programs would not affect their political representation in the Lok Sabha. This had led to wide discrepancies in the size of constituencies, with the largest having over three million electors, and the smallest less than 50,000.

Year	Details	Based on	Seats	
Year	Details	Based on	Lok Sabha	State assemblies
1952	First delimitation exercise post-independence.	1951 census	494	3,280
1963	First delimitation exercise after the reorganisation of states in 1956. Only single-seat constituencies	1961 census	522	3,771
1973	Increase in Lok Sabha seats from 522 to 543	1971 census	543	3,997
2002	No changes in Lok Sabha seats or their apportionment between the various states	2001 census	543	4,123
2026	Following the 84th amendment to the Constitution, in 2002, Delimitation is to be done after 2026, based on the first census conducted after 2026.	2027 census	TBA	TBA

== Delimitation Commissions ==
=== 1952 ===
The Delimitation Commission of 1952 was created due to the Delimitation of Parliamentary and Assembly Constituencies Order, 1951. Justice N. Chandrasekhara Aiyar, a retired justice of the Supreme Court, was its chairman in 1953. The commission recommended the increase of the seats in the Lok Sabha from 489 (Note: There were 489 seats during the 1951–52 Indian general election) to 494.

=== 1963 ===
The commission recommended the increase of the seats in the Lok Sabha from 494 to 522.

=== 1973 ===
The delimitation commission of 1973 was chaired by Justice J. L. Kapur, a retired justice of the Supreme Court. The commission recommended the increase of the seats in the Lok Sabha from 522 to 542 (later increased to 543 with the addition of one more seat for the new state of Sikkim). It also recommended an increase in the total number of assembly seats across all states and Union Territories in the country from 3771 to 3997 (including 32 for Sikkim's legislative assembly).

=== 2002 ===
The most recent delimitation commission was set up on 12 July 2002 after the 2001 census with Justice Kuldip Singh, a retired Judge of the Supreme Court as its Chairperson. The Commission has submitted its recommendations. In December 2007, the Supreme Court on a petition issued notice to the central government asking reasons for non implementation. On 4 January 2008, the Cabinet Committee on Political Affairs (CCPA) decided to implement the order from the Delimitation Commission. The recommendations of the Commission were approved by President Pratibha Patil on 19 February. This means that all future elections in India for states covered by the commission will be held under the newly formed constituencies.

The present delimitation of parliamentary constituencies has been done on the basis of 2001 census figures under the provisions of the Delimitation Act, 2002. The assembly election in Karnataka, conducted in three phases in May 2008, was the first to use the new boundaries as drawn by the 2002 delimitation commission.

The tenure of the Delimitation Commission lasted until 31 May 2008. The delimitation orders issued by the Commission were given effect from 19 February 2008 for most states and union territories and 20 March 2008 for Tripura and Meghalaya, by a presidential order. The orders regarding Jharkhand were nullified till 2026 by inserting section 10B into the Delimitation Act, 2002.

The delimitation of four north-eastern states was deferred due to security risks, by four separate presidential orders, all issued on 8 February 2008, for Assam, Arunachal Pradesh, Nagaland and Manipur. The order regarding Assam was rescinded on 28 February 2020. Subsequently, the Government of India has reconstituted the Delimitation Commission for these four states as well as the union territory of Jammu and Kashmir on 6 March 2020, under the chairpersonship of former Supreme Court judge Ranjana Prakash Desai. In March 2021, the four north-eastern states were removed from the purview of the reconstituted Commission.

=== Next Delimitation Commission ===
The present delimitation of parliamentary constituencies within states has been done on the basis of the 2001 census, under the provisions of the Delimitation Act of 2002. However, the Constitution of India was specifically amended in 2002, not to have interstate delimitation of constituencies till the "first census conducted after the year 2026". Thus, the present constituencies carved out on the basis of the 2001 census shall continue to be in operation till then.

== Delimitation Orders ==
Delimitation Act	Year	Delimitation Order	Ref
Representation of the People Act, 1950	1951	Delimitation of Parliamentary and Assembly Constituencies Order, 1951	
Delimitation Commission Act, 1952	1953–1955	Final Orders for the Delimitation of Constituencies, 1953–1955	
Delimitation Commission Act, 1952	1956	Delimitation of Parliamentary and Assembly Constituencies Order, 1956	
Delimitation Commission Act, 1952	1961	Delimitation of Parliamentary and Assembly Constituencies Order, 1961	
Delimitation Commission Act, 1962	1964	Delimitation Orders, 1964	
Delimitation Commission Act, 1962	1967	Delimitation Orders, 1967	
Delimitation Act, 1972	1976	Delimitation of Parliamentary and Assembly Constituencies Order, 1976	
Delimitation Act, 1972	1986	Delimitation of Mizoram	
Delimitation Act, 1972	1988	Delimitation of Arunachal Pradesh	
Delimitation Act, 1972	1988	Delimitation of Goa	
Delimitation Act, 2002	2008	Delimitation of Parliamentary and Assembly Constituencies Order, 2008	
Delimitation Act, 2002	2022	Delimitation Commission Final Order– Jammu and Kashmir	
Delimitation Act, 2002	2023	Delimitation of Assam, 2023	

== Apportionment of Parliamentary and Assembly seats ==
Up until 1976, after every Indian Census the seats of Lok Sabha, Rajya Sabha and State legislative assemblies of India were re-distributed respectively throughout the country so as to have equal population representation from every seat. The apportionment was done thrice as per 1951, 1961 and 1971 population census. However, during The Emergency, through Forty-second Amendment the government froze the total Parliamentary and Assembly seats in each state till 2001 Census. This was done, mainly, due to wide discrepancies in family planning among the states. Thus, it gives time to states with higher fertility rates to implement family planning to bring the fertility rates down.

Even though the boundaries of constituencies were altered in 2001 to equate population among the parliamentary and assembly seats; the number of Lok Sabha seats that each state has and those of legislative assemblies has remained unaltered since 1971 census and may only be changed after 2026 as the constitution was again amended (84th amendment to Indian Constitution) in 2002 to continue the freeze on the total number of seats in each state till 2026. This was mainly done as states which had implemented family planning widely like Kerala, Tamil Nadu and Punjab would stand to lose many parliamentary seats and states with poor family planning programs and higher fertility rates like Uttar Pradesh, Bihar and Rajasthan would gain many of the seats transferred from better-performing states.

== See also ==
- Delimitation Act, 2002
- Boundary commissions (United Kingdom)
