= Sarjoo Prasad =

3rd Chief Justice of Rajasthan High Court

Hon'ble Chief Justice Sarjoo Prasad

3rd Chief Justice of Rajasthan High Court
- In office 28 February 1959 – 10 October 1961
- Nominated by: Sudhi Ranjan Das
- Appointed by: Rajendra Prasad
- Preceded by: K. N. Wanchoo; Kanwar Lal Bapna (acting)
- Succeeded by: Jawan Singh Ranawat

3rd Chief Justice of Gauhati High Court
- In office 10 February 1953 – 20 February 1959
- Appointed by: Rajendra Prasad
- Preceded by: T. V. Thadani; Ram Labhaya (acting)
- Succeeded by: C. P. Sinha

Judge of Patna High Court
- In office 13 January 1950 – 10 February 1953
- Appointed by: Rajendra Prasad

Personal details
- Profession: Lawyer, Judge

Sarjoo Prasad was an Indian judge and the Chief Justice of High Courts of Rajasthan and Gauhati. He was also former judge of Patna High Court.

== Career ==
Prasad began his legal practice at the Patna High Court in 1924. Over the following two decades he established himself as one of the leaders of the Patna Bar, which can be seen from his 8 year long membership at the Bar Council. He was appointed as the Government pleader in 1943. Alongside his practice, he maintained a strong connection with legal education. He served as a professor at Patna Law College for ten years, from 1939 to 1949.

His judicial career began on 13 January 1950, when he became a judge of the Patna High Court. His tenure at Patna was, however, relatively brief. On 10 February 1953, he was elevated as the 3rd Chief Justice of the Assam High Court, the institution that subsequently became Gauhati High Court. His long tenure of six years also provided continuity during the formative period of the court. On 28 February 1959 Prasad was transferred again, this time as the 3rd Chief Justice of the Rajasthan High Court, succeeding K. N. Wanchoo, who was then elevated to Supreme Court of India. His tenure in Rajasthan lasted for more than two and a half years, until his retirement on 10 October 1961.
