= Ronald Lodge =

British judge (1889-1960)

Sir Ronald Francis Lodge

1st Chief Justice of Gauhati High Court
- In office 5 April 1948 – 7 April 1949
- Appointed by: Lord Mountbatten
- Preceded by: Office established
- Succeeded by: T. V. Thadani

Judge of Calcutta High Court
- In office 17 November 1938 – 4 April 1948
- Appointed by: George VI

Personal details
- Born: 8 April 1889
- Died: 3 March 1960 (aged 70)
- Occupation: Civil servant, Judge

Sir Ronald Francis Lodge (8 April 1889 – 3 March 1960) was a British judge and member of the Indian Civil Service who had a long judicial career in British India as judge of the Calcutta High Court before becoming the first Chief Justice of the newly established High Court of Assam.

== Early life and career ==
Lodge was born on 8 April 1889. He subsequently entered the Indian Civil Service (ICS), the elite administrative service of British India. Lodge served in the judicial and administrative establishment of British India, such as a Sessions Judge in Assam and subsequently in important judicial positions like Registrar, Calcutta High Court and judge in Charge of the English Department connected with the Calcutta High Court. His experience in Assam before becoming head of its High Court is significant because it meant that his appointment in 1948 was not that of a completely unfamiliar outsider to the province's judicial administration.

Lodge was appointed a puisne judge of the Calcutta High Court on 17 November 1938. He remained a judge of that court until his appointment as the first Chief Justice of the newly constituted Assam High Court in 1948.

His period on the Calcutta High Court is particularly notable because of his participation in the famous Bhawal Sanyasi litigation. In 1938–1939, Lodge sat on the three-judge appellate Bench that heard the litigation concerning the identity of the claimant who asserted that he was the surviving Kumar of Bhawal. The other judges on the Bench were Justice Costello and Justice Charu Chandra Biswas. Lodge delivered a dissenting judgment, while the majority accepted the claimant's case.

== First Chief Justice of the Assam High Court ==
Lodge's most historically significant judicial appointment came in 1948, immediately after India's independence. The High Court of Assam was constituted in the final phase of the constitutional arrangements inherited from the Government of India Act, 1935. Lodge was appointed its first Chief Justice and assumed office on 5 April 1948. His appointment therefore has a special institutional significance: unlike later Chief Justices, he did not succeed another Chief Justice; he inaugurated the office itself.

His appointment also placed him at the head of a completely new High Court at a particularly important point in India's constitutional transition. The Assam High Court was one of the new institutional arrangements through which the judicial administration of the northeastern region was reorganised after independence. Lodge thus became the first person to exercise the constitutional and administrative responsibilities of Chief Justice of that court.

The importance of his appointment is also reflected in the subsequent history of the institution: the court that he headed in 1948 ultimately developed into the present Gauhati High Court. His name consequently stands at the beginning of the court's institutional lineage.

He made legal history as Chief Justice by authoring the Assam High Court's very first ruling, which was delivered in the 1948 civil revision matter, Ali Laskar vs Arabjan Bibi.

His tenure lasted only about one year, from 5 April 1948 until his resignation on 7 April 1949, but this short period was institutionally important because he presided over the court during its establishment and first year of operation.

== Governor of Assam ==
Following the death of Governor of Assam, Muhammad Saleh Akbar Hydari on 28 December 1948, Lodge became Acting Governor of Assam. The official historical list maintained by the Assam Legislative Assembly records "Sir Ronald Francis Lodge (acting)" as Governor from 30 December 1948 to 16 February 1949. His acting governorship lasted until 16 February 1949, when Sri Prakasa assumed the governorship.
