= Kuldip Singh (judge) =

Indian judge (1932–2024)

Judge of the Supreme Court of India
- In office 14 December 1988 – 21 December 1996

Chairperson of Delimitation Commission of India
- In office 12 July 2002 – 2003
- Appointed by: Avul Pakir Jainulabdeen Abdul Kalam
- Preceded by: J. L. Kapur (1973)
- Succeeded by: Ranjana Prakash Desai (2020)

Personal details
- Born: 1 January 1932 Jhelum, Punjab Province, British India (now Punjab, Pakistan)
- Died: 25 November 2024 (aged 92) Chandigarh, India
- Education: Punjab University; University College London; Lincoln's Inn

Kuldip Singh (1 January 1932 – 25 November 2024) was an Indian attorney and judge of the Supreme Court of India. Following his retirement from the Supreme Court, he headed the Delimitation Commission of 2002 that was tasked with redrawing the boundaries of the various state assemblies and Lok Sabha constituencies based on the 2001 census.

Singh received his education from Col. Brown Cambridge School, followed by his first law degree from Punjab University in 1955 and a second one from the University of London in 1958. He served as a barrister-at-law at Lincoln's Inn in London before returning to India in 1959.

Singh was appointed to the Supreme Court on 14 December 1988 and retired on 21 December 1996.

Singh died on 25 November 2024, at the age of 92.
