= DAV College, Kanpur =

College in Kanpur, Uttar Pradesh, India

Coordinates: 26.480676°N 80.347352°E

D.A.V. College, Kanpur
- Type: Public
- Established: 1919; 107 years ago
- Affiliations: Chhatrapati Shahu Ji Maharaj University (1968–present); Dr. Bhimrao Ambedkar University (1919–1968)
- Religious affiliation: Arya Samaj
- Principal: Dr. Prem Singh
- Location: 15/64, Civil Lines, Kanpur 208001 Kanpur, Uttar Pradesh, India
- Campus: Urban
- Website: davcollegekanpur.ac.in

Dayanand Anglo Vaidik Mahavidyalaya (D.A.V. College) is a college in Kanpur, Uttar Pradesh, India. Established in 1919 by Lala Diwan Chand, it is the second oldest college in the city. The college is situated in Civil Lines, opposite the Green Park Stadium. It is affiliated with Chhatrapati Sahu Ji Maharaj University (formerly Kanpur University), formerly with the University of Agra. The college is accredited by the NAAC. Manas Pandey is the present principal of the college. It is managed by the Dayanand Anglo-Vedic College Trust and Management Society.

== History ==
In 1928, Mahatma Gandhi visited DAV College. Former President of India Ram Nath Kovind and former Prime Minister of India Atal Bihari Vajpayee are notable alumni of the college.

== Notable alumni ==
Notable alumni of this college include:

- Atal Bihari Vajpayee, former Prime Minister of India
- Ram Nath Kovind, former President of India
- Awadhesh Prasad, Member of parliament, former Cabinet minister of Uttar Pradesh
- Mahavir Singh (revolutionary), Indian revolutionary
- Vallabhdas Aidan Mohta, former Chief Justice of Orissa High Court
- Rakesh Sachan, Cabinet minister of Uttar Pradesh
- Shiv Verma, Indian revolutionary
- Ajay Mishra Teni, Former Union Minister of State for Home Affairs

== See also ==
- Arya Samaj
