= Thakurdas Vasanmal Thadani =

2nd Chief Justice of Gauhati High Court

Hon'ble Chief Justice Thakurdas Vasanmal Thadani

2nd Chief Justice of Gauhati High Court
- In office 28 May 1951 – 21 November 1952; Acting CJ :8 April 1949 - 27 May 1951
- Appointed by: Rajendra Prasad
- Preceded by: Ronald Lodge
- Succeeded by: Sarjoo Prasad; Ram Labhaya (acting)

Judge of Gauhati High Court
- In office 1948 – 27 May 1951
- Appointed by: C. Rajagopalachari

Personal details
- Born: 22 November 1892 Hyderabad, British India
- Died: 1955 (aged 62–63)
- Profession: Barrister, Judge

Thakurdas Vasanmal Thadani (1892–1955) was an Indian judge and 2nd Chief Justice of the Gauhati High Court.

== Career ==
Thadani was born in 1892 in Hyderabad, British India. After graduation he went to London and qualified as a Barrister-at-law. He joined the Provincial Judicial Service and was appointed as a judge of Sindh High Court in Karachi prior to the Partition of India in 1947. Due to political unrest, Justice Thadani resigned from the post and moved to Bombay. By 1948, Thadani was re-appointed to the bench in independent India as a Judge of the erstwhile Assam High Court. After Sir Ronald Francis Lodge, Justice Thadani became the acting and thereafter permanent Chief Justice of the Gauhati High Court. He died in the summer of 1955.
