= Vallabhdas Aidan Mohta =

Indian Judge

Justice Vallabhdas Aidan Mohta

15th Chief justice of Odisha High Court
- In office 28 September 1994 – 25 April 1995
- Preceded by: G. T. Nanavati
- Succeeded by: Sailendu Nath Phukan

Personal details
- Born: 26 April 1933
- Died: 3 July 2018

Vallabhdas Aidan Mohta (26 April 1933 – 3 July 2018) was an Indian judge and former Chief Justice of Orissa High Court.

== Career ==
Mohta was born in 1933 at Akola. He studied in New English High School, Akola and passed from DAV College, Kanpur. He completed his LL.B. from Nagpur. Besides legal practice he was involved with various social welfare works. Mohta's autobiography is titled Time and Chance. He became the founder president of Radhadevi Goenka Mahila Mahavidyalaya. In 1974, Mohta was elected as Vice Chairman of the Bar Council of Maharashtra. On 27 April 1979 he was appointed a judge of the Bombay High Court and on 28 September 1994 Mohta was elevated to the post of Chief Justice of Orissa High Court. During his tenure of judgeship he recommended the name of Justice Dipak Mishra, Hon'ble Chief Justice of India.
