= Sailendu Nath Phukan =

Former judge of Supreme Court of India (1999-2002)

Hon'ble Justice Sailendu Nath Phukan
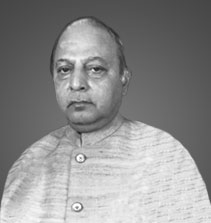

Judge of Supreme Court of India
- In office 28 January 1999 – 31 March 2002
- Nominated by: Adarsh Sein Anand
- Appointed by: K. R. Narayanan

16th Chief Justice of Orissa High Court
- In office 2 August 1996 – 27 January 1999
- Nominated by: A. M. Ahmadi
- Appointed by: S. D. Sharma
- Preceded by: V. A. Mohta; G. B. Pattanaik (acting); D. P. Mohapatra (acting); Susanta Chatterjee (acting)
- Succeeded by: Biswanath Agrawal; Susanta Chatterjee (acting); A. Pasayat (acting); R. K. Patra (acting)

12th Chief Justice of Himachal Pradesh High Court
- In office 1 March 1995 – 1 August 1996
- Nominated by: A. M. Ahmadi
- Appointed by: S. D. Sharma
- Preceded by: Gulab Chand Gupta
- Succeeded by: M. Srinivasan; Kamlesh Sharma (acting)

Judge of Himachal Pradesh High Court
- In office 30 September 1994 – 28 February 1995
- Nominated by: M. N. Venkatachaliah
- Appointed by: S. D. Sharma

Judge of Gauhati High Court
- In office 11 October 1985 – 29 September 1994
- Nominated by: P. N. Bhagwati
- Appointed by: Zail Singh
- Acting Chief Justice
- In office 2 February 1994 – 23 April 1994
- Appointed by: S. D. Sharma
- Preceded by: R. K. Manisana Singh
- Succeeded by: Viney Krishna Khanna

Personal details
- Born: 1 April 1937
- Died: 11 November 2018 (aged 81)
- Education: B.Sc and LL.B

Sailendu Nath Phukan (1 April 1937 – 11 November 2018) also known as S. N. Phukan was an Indian jurist who served as former judge of the Supreme Court of India and Chief Justice of Himachal Pradesh High Court and Orissa High Court.

== Education and career ==
Phukan was born on 1 April 1937. He completed his Bachelor of Science and Bachelor of Laws degrees before beginning his legal career in Assam. In 1960, he joined the Jorhat District Bar as a pleader. He enrolled as an advocate in 1962 and joined the Gauhati High Court Bar in the same year. In 1963, Phukan entered the Assam Judicial Service, beginning a career in the judiciary that continued until May 1976. From July 1970, he also served on deputation to the Government of Meghalaya, where he held several positions in the Law Department, including Under Secretary, Deputy Secretary and Secretary. In January 1976, he became Law Secretary and Legal Remembrancer. His other responsibilities included serving as a part-time member of the Meghalaya Board of Revenue, a part-time lecturer at Shillong Law College, a commissioner for departmental inquiries and a legal adviser to government corporations.

== As judge ==
On 11 October 1985, Phukan was appointed a permanent judge of the Gauhati High Court. Here he also served as Acting Chief Justice for over three month. He served there until his transfer to the Himachal Pradesh High Court in 1994. He subsequently became Chief Justice of the Himachal Pradesh High Court on 1 March 1995. On 2 August 1996, he was transferred to the Orissa High Court as its Chief Justice, a position he held until January 1999.

On 28 January 1999, Phukan was elevated to the Supreme Court of India. He retired from the Supreme Court on 31 March 2002, upon reaching the retirement age for Supreme Court judges. After a prolonged illness he died at age 81 on 11 November 2018. He also served as Chairman of Assam Human Rights Commission.
