= A. S. Bopanna =

Indian judge (born 1959)

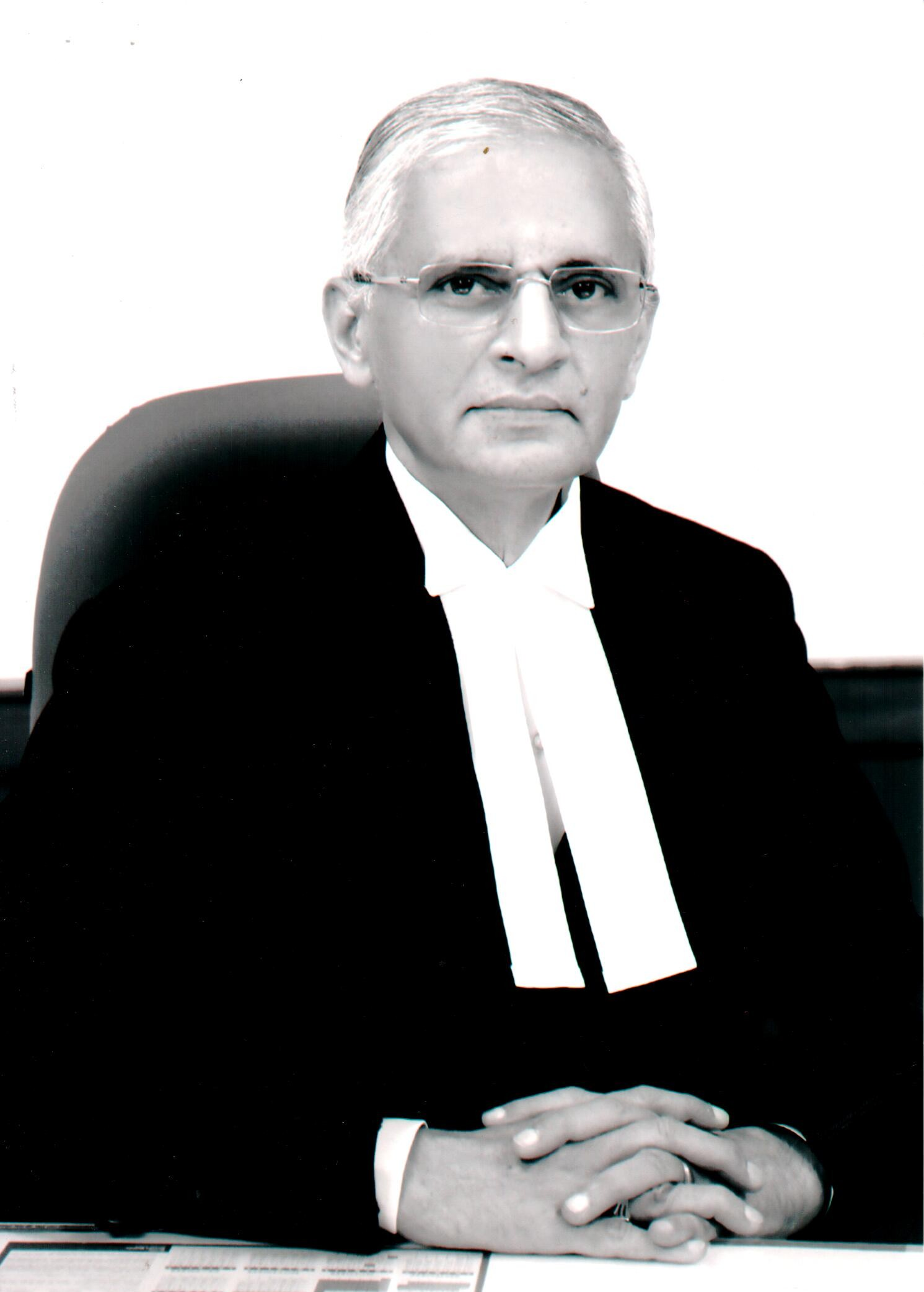

Judge of Supreme Court of India
- In office 24 May 2019 – 19 May 2024
- Nominated by: Ranjan Gogoi
- Appointed by: Ram Nath Kovind

Chief Justice of Gauhati High Court
- In office 29 October 2018 – 23 May 2019
- Nominated by: Ranjan Gogoi
- Appointed by: Ram Nath Kovind

Judge of Karnataka High Court
- In office 6 January 2006 – 28 October 2018
- Nominated by: Yogesh Kumar Sabharwal
- Appointed by: A. P. J. Abdul Kalam

Personal details
- Born: 20 May 1959 (age 66) Madikeri, Kodagu, Karnataka
- Website: https://www.sci.gov.in

Ajjikuttira Somaiah Bopanna (born 20 May 1959) is a former judge of Supreme Court of India. He was the former chief justice of the Gauhati High Court. He was also a judge of Karnataka High Court.

Over the course of his tenure on the Supreme Court, Bopanna authored 91 judgments and sat on 518 benches. Bopanna was a part of benches that upheld the 2016 Demonetization Policy, determined the scope of Article 19(1)(a) of the Constitution, approved the use of circumstantial evidence in bribery cases, and determined that members of Parliament did not have immunity from criminal proceedings over bribery charges.
