= Banwari Lal Hansaria =

Indian judge

Justice Banwari Lal Hansaria

13th Chief justice of Odisha High Court
- In office 22 February 1990 – 13 December 1993
- Preceded by: Hari Lal Agrawal
- Succeeded by: G. T. Nanavati

Personal details
- Born: 25 December 1931
- Died: 3 November 1997

Banwari Lal Hansaria (25 December 1931 ― 3 November 1997) was a judge of the Supreme Court of India.

== Career ==
Hansaria completed his schooling in Sardarshahar and studied at Birla Arts College, Pilani. He passed M.A. from the Calcutta University and M.Sc. from the London School of Economics. After passing LL.B., he started practice and was engaged in JB Law College of Guwahati as a lecturer. Hansaria was appointed District and Sessions Judge in 1971. From 15 July 1976 to 9 February 1979, he served as the Legal Remembrancer and Judicial Department Secretary to the Government of Assam. In 1979, Hansaria was elevated as Judge of Gauhati High Court. He became the Chief Justice of Orissa High Court on 22 February 1990. Justice Hansaria was appointed Judge of the Supreme Court of India on 14 December 1993 and retired from the service in 1996. He is the author of number of law books and articles.
