= Baharul Islam =

Indian judge (1918–1993)

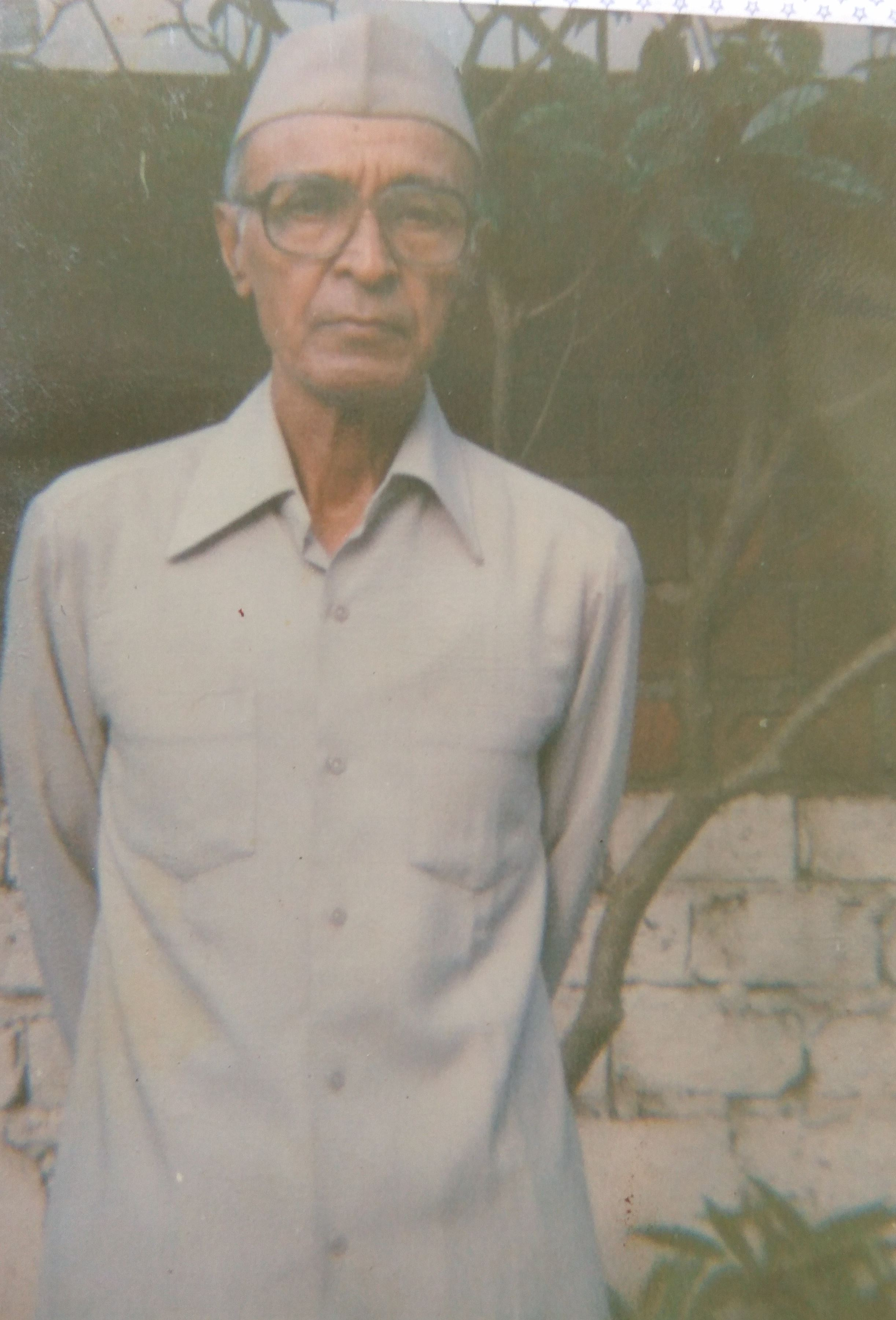

Member of Parliament, Rajya Sabha
- In office 15 June 1983 – 14 June 1989

Judge of the Supreme Court of India
- In office 4 December 1980 – 12 January 1983
- Nominated by: Y. V. Chandrachud
- Appointed by: Indira Gandhi

13th Chief Justice of Gauhati High Court
- In office 7 July 1979 – 1 March 1980
- Nominated by: Y. V. Chandrachud
- Appointed by: Indira Gandhi
- Preceded by: Chand Mal Lodha
- Succeeded by: Dambarudhar Pathak

Judge of Gauhati High Court
- In office 20 January 1972 – 6 July 1979
- Appointed by: Indira Gandhi

Member of Parliament, Rajya Sabha
- In office 3 April 1962 – 20 January 1972

Personal details
- Born: 1 March 1918
- Died: 5 February 1993 (aged 74)
- Party: Indian National Congress
- Education: Faculty of Law, Aligarh Muslim University

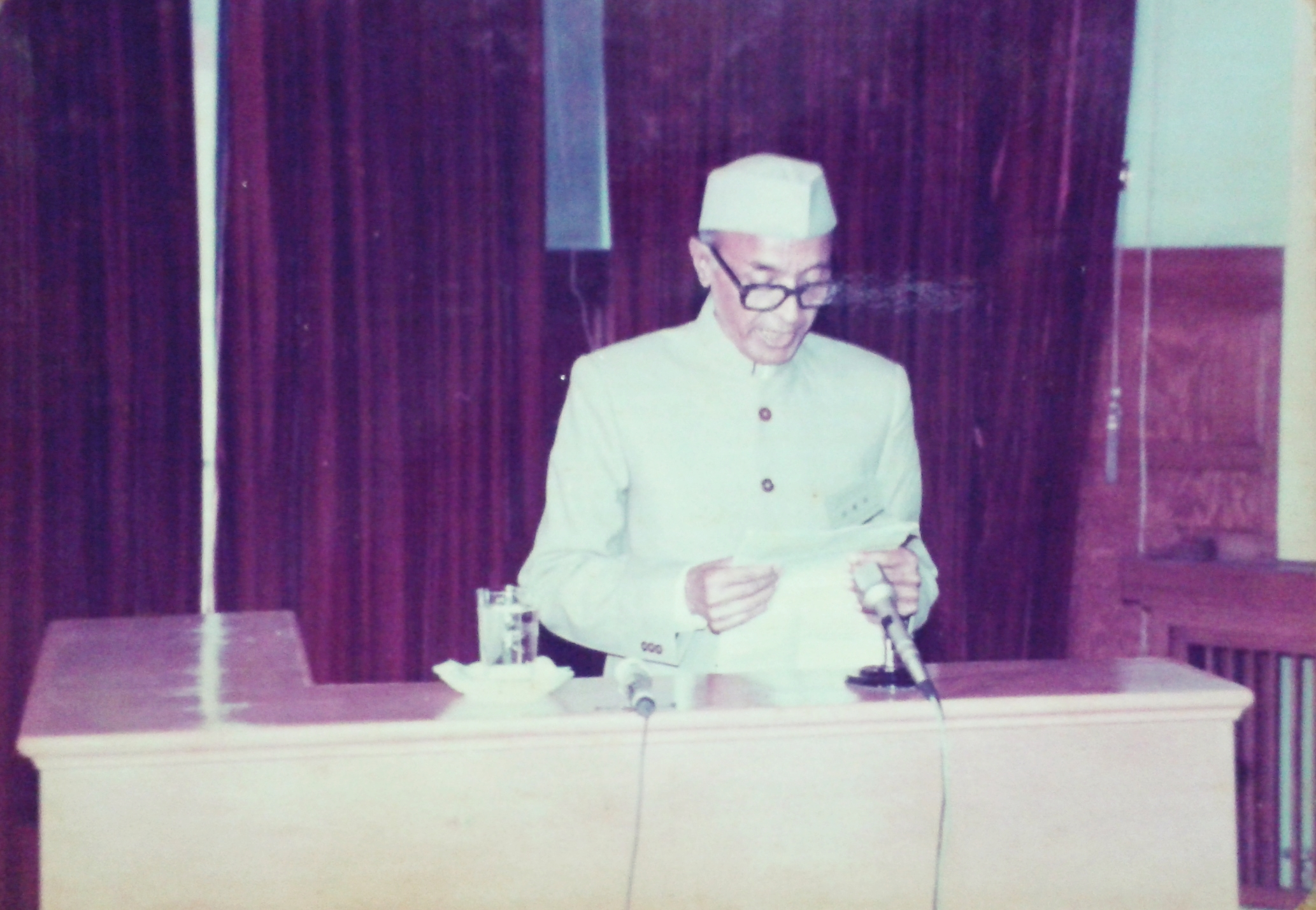
Islam in Beijing, China, attending the Forum for Safeguarding World Peace (June 1985).

Baharul Islam (1 March 1918 – 5 February 1993) was an Indian politician and judge of the Supreme Court of India. He was elected to the Rajya Sabha, the upper house of the Parliament of India, as a member of the Indian National Congress. In 1972, he resigned from the Rajya Sabha to become a judge in the Gauhati High Court, where he eventually retired as Chief Justice. He was later recalled and appointed as a judge of the Supreme Court, where he delivered a judgment absolving the then-Chief Minister of Bihar, Jagannath Mishra, in the urban cooperative bank scandal. He subsequently resigned from the Supreme Court to contest elections as a Congress party candidate and was re-elected to the Rajya Sabha. He was the one and only Justice in the entire History of India who has been elevated to Supreme Court of India 9 months after the retirement from any of the High courts of India.

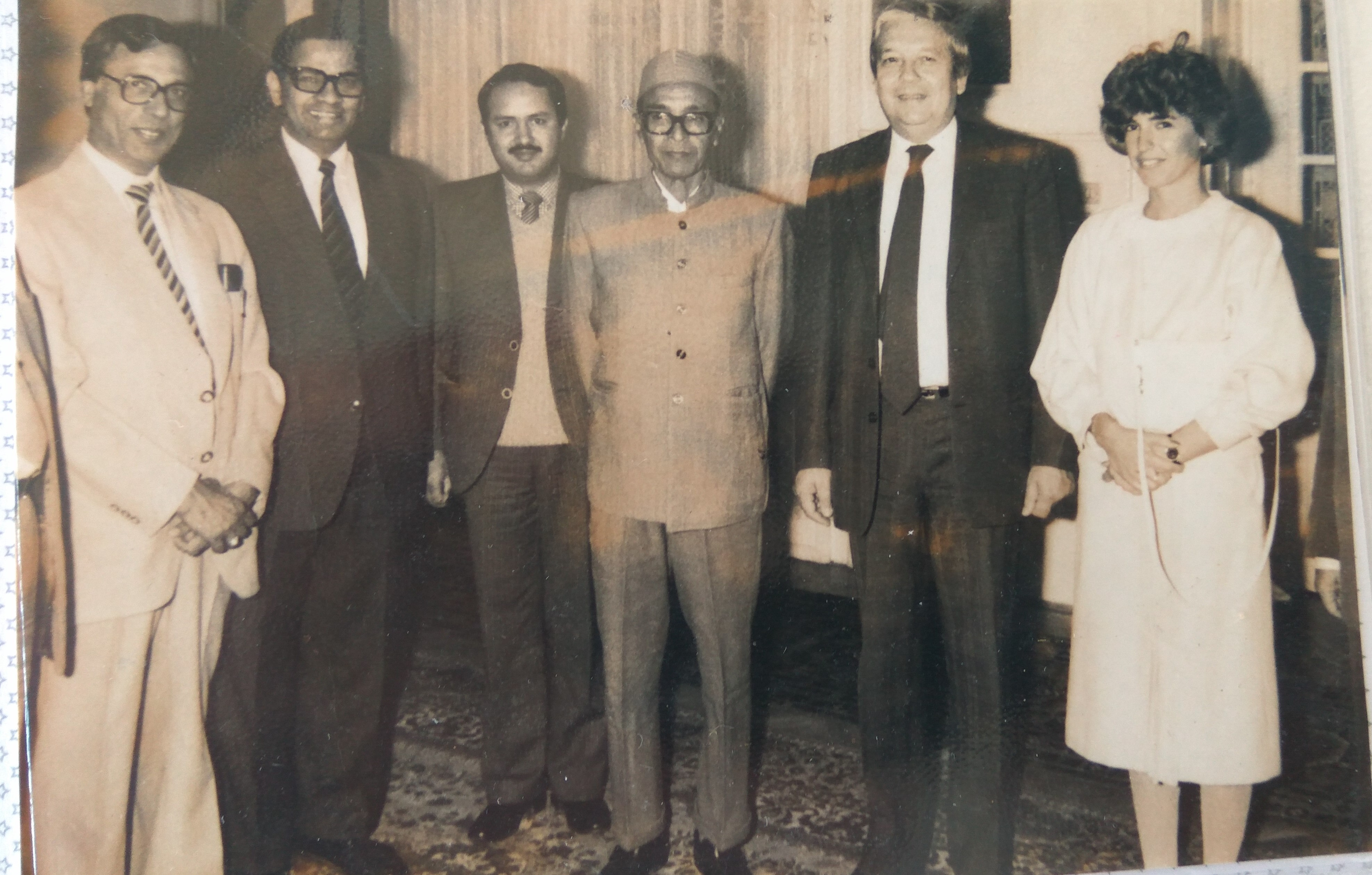
Islam in Hungary as a Member of Parliament, September 1985.

== Early life ==
He was born in the village of Udiana in Kamrup district, Assam. Islam attended Gurdon High School in Nalbari, followed by Cotton University in Guwahati and Aligarh Muslim University.

== Career ==
Islam enrolled as an advocate of the Assam High Court in 1951 and of the Supreme Court in 1958. He joined the Indian National Congress in 1956. In 1962 and again in 1968, he was elected to the Rajya Sabha, resigning in 1972 to be appointed a judge of the then Assam and Nagaland High Court (now Gauhati High Court) on 20 January 1972. Islam was appointed acting chief justice of the Gauhati High Court on 11 March 1979 and became chief justice on 7 July 1979. He retired from this role on 1 March 1980.

On 4 December 1980, Islam was appointed to the Supreme Court of India in an unprecedented move, as retired judges were not typically reappointed. He resigned from the Supreme Court on 12 January 1983 to contest from Barpeta, Assam, for the Lok Sabha as a Congress candidate. However, as elections in Assam were postponed in the 1984 Indian general election, he was re-elected to the Rajya Sabha.

He was also a member of the Gauhati High Court Bar Association.

=== Committees ===
In 1987, the Islam Committee was appointed to draft legislation focused on the rights, equal opportunities, and full participation of disabled persons.
