= Gauhati High Court =

Indian High Court jurisdiction

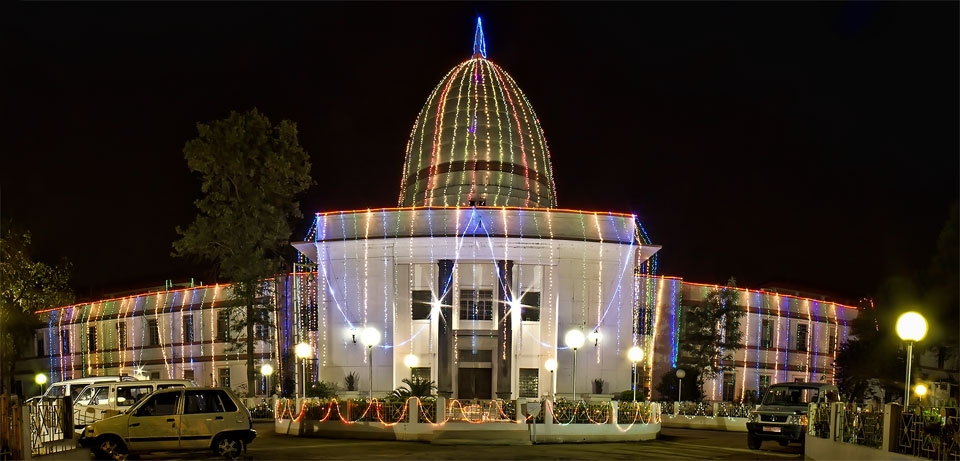
- Guwahati High Court Building

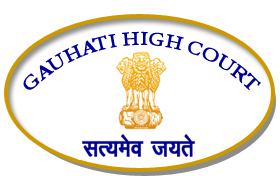
- Interactive map of Gauhati High Court
- 26.1913°N 91.7514°E
- Established: 5 April 1948; 78 years ago
- Jurisdiction: Assam, Arunachal Pradesh, Nagaland, and Mizoram
- Location: Principal Seat: Guwahati, Assam; Permanent Benches: Kohima, Aizawl & Itanagar
- Coordinates: 26.1913°N 91.7514°E
- Composition method: Presidential with confirmation of Chief Justice of India and Governor of respective state.
- Authorised by: Constitution of India
- Appeals to: Supreme Court of India
- Judge term length: mandatory retirement by age of 62
- Number of positions: 30 (Permanent 22; Additional 8)
- Website: www.ghconline.gov.in

Chief Justice
- Currently: Ashutosh Kumar
- Since: 21 July 2025

The Gauhati High Court was promulgated by the governor general of India on 1 March 1948 after the Government of India Act 1935 was passed, establishing the high court with effect from 5 April 1948, for the then-province of Assam. It was originally known as the High Court of Assam and Nagaland, but renamed as Gauhati High Court in 1971 by the North-Eastern Areas (Reorganisation) Act, 1971.

It has the largest jurisdiction in terms of states, with its area covering the states of Assam, Arunachal Pradesh, Nagaland, and Mizoram.

== History ==
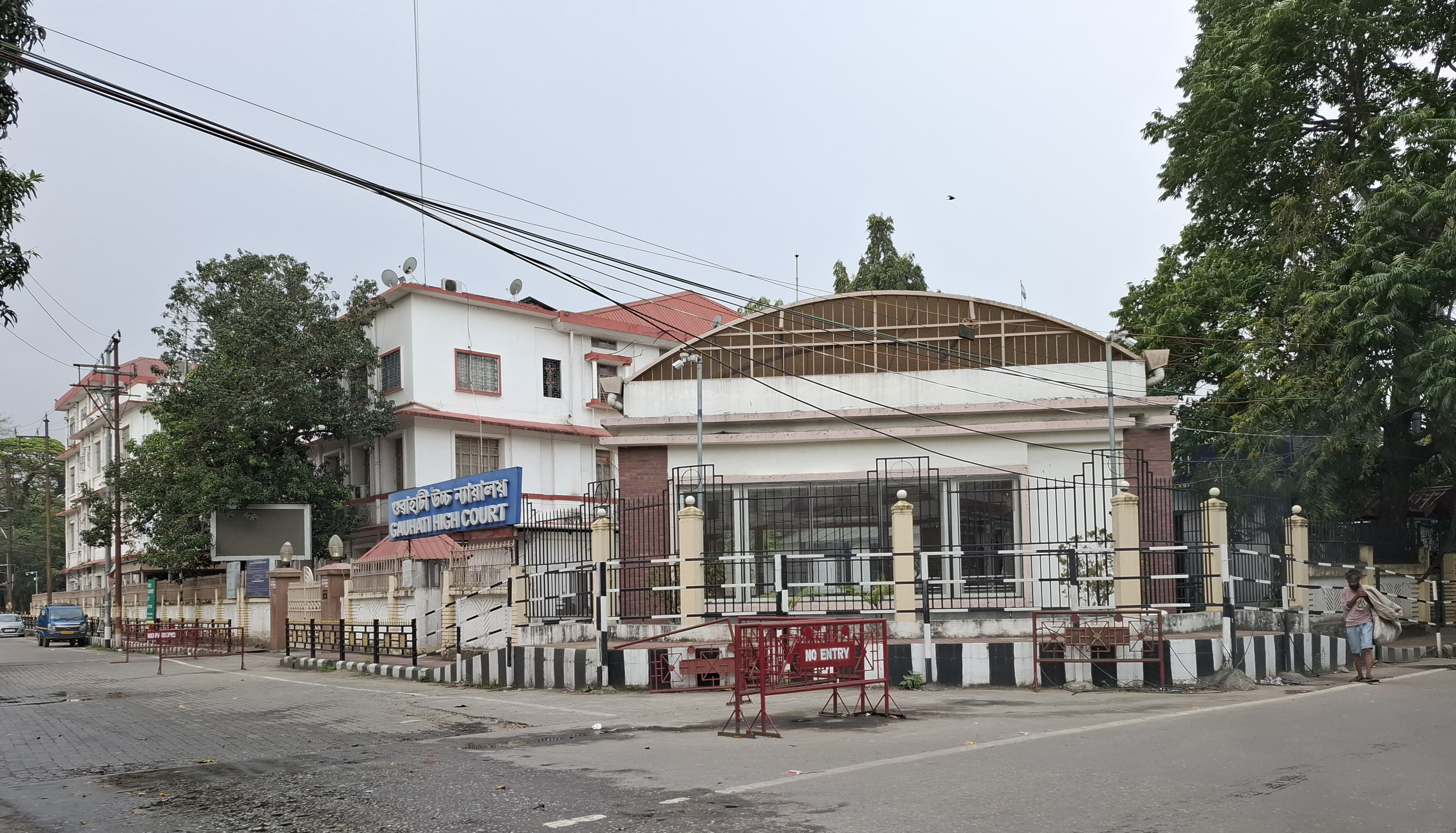
Gauhati High Court building in Guwahati

After Indian independence, the Assam Legislative Assembly adopted a resolution on 9 September 1947 that a High Court be established for the province of Assam. In exercise of power conferred by the Government of India Act 1935, the Governor General of India on 1 March 1948 promulgated the Assam High Court Order, 1948, establishing the High Court of Assam. It was inaugurated on 5 April 1948 by H. J. Kania, the chief justice of India. Sir R.F. Lodge was sworn in as the first Chief Justice of the Assam High Court on the same day. The Assam High Court initially had its sittings at Shillong but shifted to Guwahati on 14 August 1948.

Later, when Nagaland state was created on 1 December 1963, the Assam High Court was renamed as the High Court of Assam and Nagaland.

On re-organization of the northeastern region of India by the North-Eastern Areas (Reorganisation) Act, 1971, the High Court of Assam and Nagaland was abolished with effect from 21 January 1972 by section 28(1)(a) of the Act. The Courts of Judicial Commissioners for Manipur and Tripura, which were functioning as high courts, were also abolished by section 30(1) of the Act. In place of these three entities, a common high court for five states, named Gauhati High Court, was established by section 28(1)(b) of the Act. This High Court was given jurisdiction over the then union territories of Arunachal Pradesh and Mizoram by section 32 of the Act.

After Meghalaya, Manipur and Tripura got a high court, the Gauhati High Court ceased its jurisdiction in these three states.

== Principal seat and benches ==
The principal seat of the Gauhati High Court is at Guwahati in Assam. The court has 3 outlying benches. These are:

=== The Kohima bench for Nagaland state ===
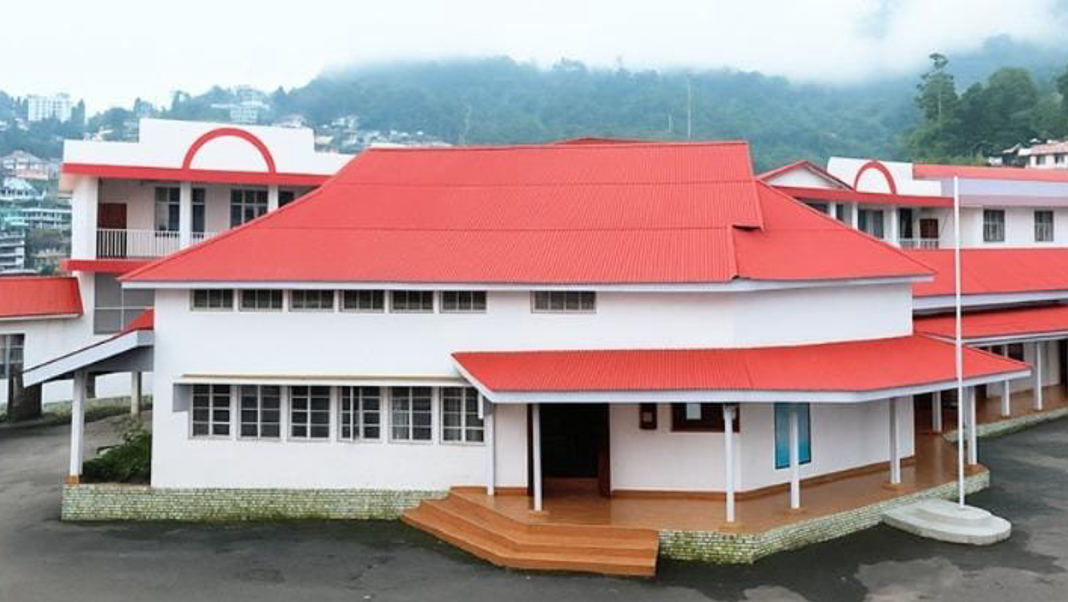
New Building of Kohima Bench, Gauhati High Court.

The bench of the High Court in Nagaland is located on the eastern slope of the Ministers' Hill in the capital city of Nagaland, Kohima. The building housing the Kohima bench was earlier a hostel, which was renovated for the Kohima bench. The bench was inaugurated on 1 December 1972, by the Honorable Mr. Justice M.C. Pathak.

The permanent judge for the state of Nagaland is Lanusungkum Jamir. Elevated as Additional Judge on 22 May 2013.

=== The Itanagar bench for Arunachal Pradesh state ===
The bench of the High Court in Arunachal Pradesh is located at Itanagar more specified at Naharlagun, which is located about 13 km from the capital town, Itanagar. The Itanagar permanent bench of the Gauhati High Court was inaugurated on 12 August 2000 by A.S. Anand. The permanent judge is Pranoy Kumar Musahary.

=== The Aizawl bench for Mizoram state ===
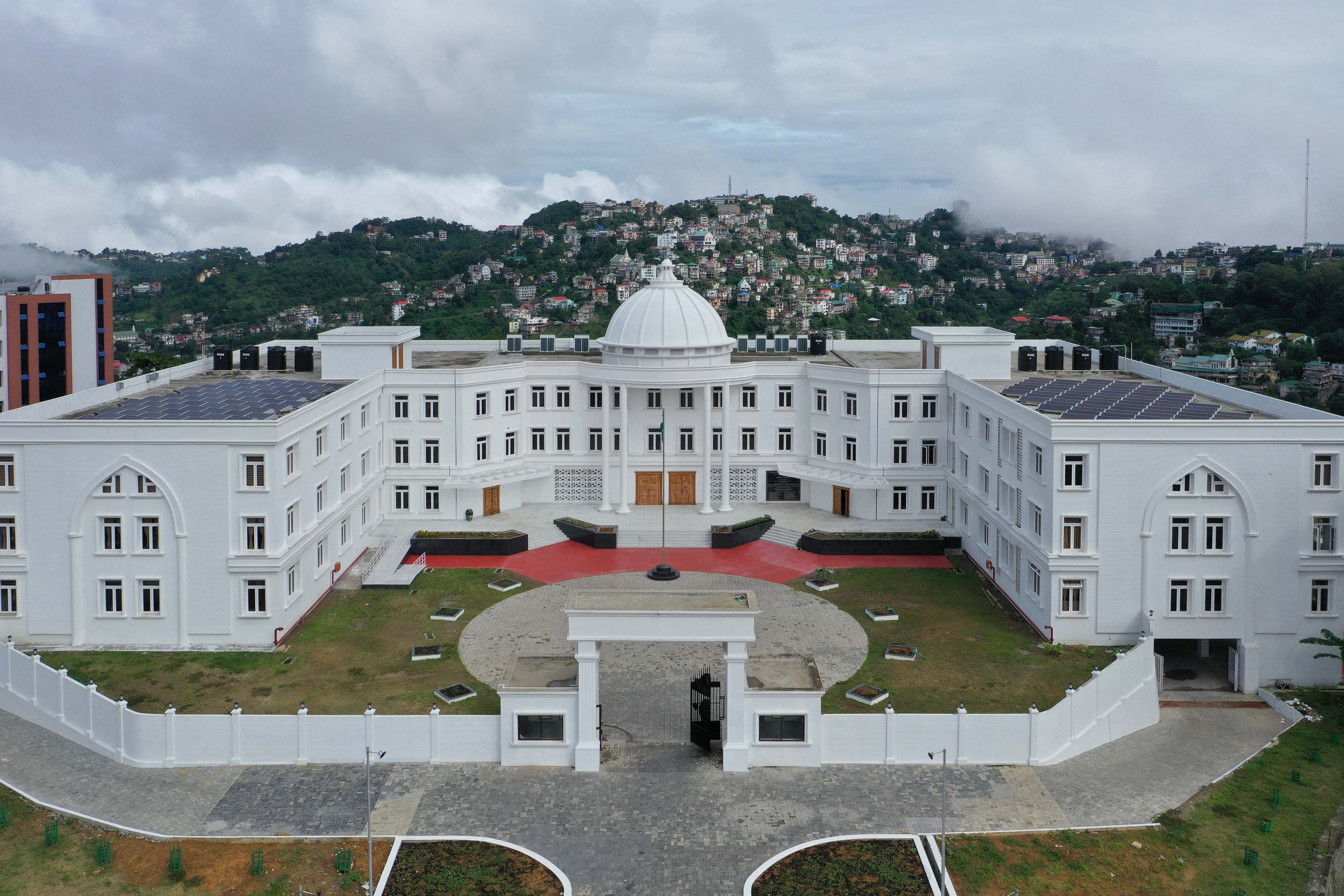
New Building of Aizawl Bench, Gauhati High Court.

The Aizawl bench of the High Court in Mizoram is situated at the capital city of Mizoram, Aizawl. On 5 July 1990, the Aizawl permanent bench of the Gauhati High Court was established and inaugurated by the then-chief justice of India, S.B. Mukherjee. The permanent judge is M. R. Pathak. Elevated as additional judge on 22 May 2013 is Michael Zothankhuma.

== Chief Justice and Judges ==
The Judges of Gauhati High Court (other than the Chief Justice of the Gauhati High Court) are appointed by the President by warrant under his hand and seal after consultation with the Chief Justice of India, and on the recommendation of the Chief Justice of the Gauhati High Court. The Chief Justice of India is required to consult with two senior-most judges of the Supreme Court. The Chief Justice of the High Court is also required to consult his two senior-most puisne Judges before recommending a name for appointment to the High Court.

Currently, the sanctioned strength of Judges of the Gauhati High Court is 22 permanent Judges and 8 Additional Judges. Following is the list of sitting Judges of the High Court of Delhi

== List of chief justices ==
#	Portrait	Chief justice	Tenure	
#	Portrait	Chief justice	Start	End
1		Ronald Francis Lodge	5 April 1948	7 April 1949
2		Thakurdas Vasanmal Thadani	28 May 1951	21 November 1952
3		Sarjoo Prasad	10 February 1953	20 February 1959
4		Chandreswar Prasad Sinha	21 February 1959	31 January 1961
5		Holiram Deka	1 February 1961	29 June 1961
6		Gopalji Mehrotra	30 June 1961	6 February 1967
7		Canakapalli Sanjeevrow Nayudu	7 February 1967	7 March 1968
8		Sarat Kumar Dutta	8 March 1968	30 January 1970
9		Parbati Kumar Goswami	31 January 1970	9 September 1973
10		Mahendra Chandra Pathak	9 January 1974	30 June 1977
11		Mahadevayya Sadanand Swami	1 October 1977	5 July 1978
12		Chand Mal Lodha	6 July 1978	10 March 1979
13		Baharul Islam	7 July 1979	1 March 1980
14		Dambarudhar Pathak	18 April 1983	8 August 1983
15		Tribeni Sahai Misra	12 August 1983	14 November 1984
16		Palem Chennakesava Reddy	30 September 1985	2 November 1986
17		Kiranmoy Lahiri	3 November 1986	19 December 1986
18		Khagendra Nath Saikia	14 June 1987	29 February 1988
19		Guman Mal Lodha	1 March 1988	15 March 1988
20		Anisetti Raghuvir	6 May 1988	21 March 1991
21		Ullal Lakshminarayana Bhat	20 August 1991	12 December 1993
22		Rajkumar Manisana Singh	27 January 1994	1 February 1994
23		Viney Krishna Khanna	24 April 1994	14 February 1997
24		Muniyallapa Ramakrishna	18 June 1997	12 April 1998
25		Brijesh Kumar	12 February 1999	18 October 2000
26		Naresh Chandra Jain	19 October 2000	5 April 2001
27		Ravinder Singh Mongia	21 September 2001	9 June 2002
28		Prakash Prabhakar Naolekar	10 June 2002	26 August 2004
29		Binod Kumar Roy	21 May 2005	29 September 2005
30		Buchireddy Sudershan Reddy	5 December 2005	11 January 2007
31		Jasti Chelameswar	3 May 2007	16 March 2010
32		Ramesh Surajmal Garg	17 April 2010	18 June 2010
33		Madan Lokur	24 June 2010	14 November 2011
34		Adarsh Kumar Goel	20 December 2011	11 October 2013
35		Abhay Manohar Sapre	19 October 2013	12 August 2014
36		Ajit Singh	5 March 2016	5 September 2018
37		Ajjikuttira Somaiah Bopanna	29 October 2018	23 May 2019
38		Ajai Lamba	7 October 2019	20 September 2020
39		Sudhanshu Dhulia	10 January 2021	8 May 2022
40		Rashmin Manharbhai Chhaya	23 June 2022	11 January 2023
41		Sandeep Mehta	15 February 2023	8 November 2023
42		Vijay Bishnoi	5 February 2024	29 May 2025
43		Ashutosh Kumar	21 July 2025	Incumbent

== Judges elevated as Chief Justices ==
This sections contains list of only those judges elevated as chief justices whose parent high court is Gauhati. This includes those judges who, at the time of appointment as chief justice, may not be serving in Gauhati High Court but this list does not include judges who at the time of appointment as chief justice were serving in Gauhati High but does not have Gauhati as their parent High Court.

Justice N. Kotiswar Singh and Subhasis Talapatra were originally appointed as judges of Gauhati High Court but opted for High courts of Manipur and Tripura respectively as their parent high courts when they were established, thus they are not included in this list.

Colour Key

- Female Chief Justice
- Served as Chief Justice of India

Symbol Key

- ^{‡} Elevated to Supreme Court of India
- ^{RES} Resigned
- ^{†} Died in office

Name	Image	Appointed as CJ in HC of	Date of appointment		Date of retirement (Note: this includes date of resignation, death and elevation to supreme court)	Tenure	
Name	Image	Appointed as CJ in HC of	As Judge	As Chief Justice	Date of retirement	As Chief Justice	As Judge (Note: also includes tenure as Chief Justice)
Thakurdas Vasanmal Thadani		Gauhati	1948	28 May 1951	21 November 1952	1 year, 178 days	
Holiram Deka		Gauhati	5 June 1951	1 February 1961	29 June 1961	149 days	10 years, 25 days
Sarat Kumar Dutta		Gauhati	25 February 1961	8 March 1968	30 January 1970	1 year, 329 days	8 years, 340 days
Parbati Kumar Goswami		Gauhati	12 May 1967	31 January 1970	9 September 1973^{[‡]}	3 years, 222 days	6 years, 121 days
Mahendra Chandra Pathak		Gauhati	23 August 1967	9 January 1974	30 June 1977	3 years, 173 days	9 years, 312 days
Baharul Islam		Gauhati	20 January 1972	7 July 1979	1 March 1980^{[†]} (Note: Elevated to Supreme Court of India on 4 December 1980 after retiring as High Court Judge on 1 March 1980)	239 days	8 years, 42 days
Dambarudhar Pathak		Gauhati, transferred to Orissa	8 August 1973	18 April 1983	28 February 1986	2 years, 317 days	12 years, 205 days
Kiranmoy Lahiri		Gauhati	19 November 1975	3 November 1986	19 December 1986	47 days	11 years, 31 days
Khagendra Nath Saikia		Gauhati	12 February 1979	14 June 1987	29 February 1988^{[‡]} (Note: Elevated to Supreme Court of India on 14 December 1988 after retiring as High Court Judge on 29 February 1988)	261 days	9 years, 18 days
Banwari Lal Hansaria		Orissa	12 February 1979	22 February 1990	13 December 1993^{[‡]}	3 years, 295 days	14 years, 305 days
Rajkumar Manisana Singh		Gauhati	21 November 1984	27 January 1994	1 February 1994	6 days	9 years, 73 days
Sailendu Nath Phukan		Himachal Pradesh, transferred to Orissa	11 October 1985	1 March 1995	27 January 1999^{[‡]}	3 years, 333 days	13 years, 109 days
Bhagwati Prasad Saraf		Jammu & Kashmir	2 January 1989	21 February 2000	22 August 2001	1 year, 183 days	12 years, 233 days
Wungazan Awungshi Shishak		Chhattisgarh, transferred to Himachal Pradesh	2 January 1989	5 December 2000	31 December 2002	2 years, 27 days	13 years, 364 days
Hotoi Khetoho Sema		Jammu & Kashmir	24 May 1989	12 September 2001	8 April 2002^{[‡]}	209 days	12 years, 320 days
Sujit Barman Roy		Orissa	14 November 1991	10 March 2003	21 January 2007	3 years, 325 days	15 years, 69 days
Mukundakam Sharma		Delhi	10 January 1994	4 December 2006	8 April 2008^{[‡]}	1 year, 127 days	14 years, 90 days
Aftab Hussain Saikia		Sikkim, transferred to Jammu & Kashmir	15 November 2000	7 March 2009	6 April 2011	2 years, 31 days	10 years, 143 days
Ranjan Gogoi		Punjab & Haryana	28 February 2001	12 February 2011	22 April 2012^{[‡]}	1 year, 71 days	11 years, 55 days
Amitava Roy		Rajasthan, transferred to Orissa	4 February 2002	2 January 2013	26 February 2015^{[‡]}	2 years, 56 days	13 years, 23 days
Iqbal Ahmed Ansari		Patna	4 March 2002	29 July 2016	28 October 2016	92 days	14 years, 239 days
Tinilanthang Vaiphei		Tripura	17 July 2003	21 September 2016	28 February 2018	1 year, 161 days	14 years, 227 days
Hrishikesh Roy		Kerala	12 October 2006	8 August 2018	21 September 2019^{[‡]}	1 year, 45 days	12 years, 345 days
Arup Kumar Goswami		Sikkim, transferred to Andhra Pradesh then to Chhattisgarh	24 January 2011	15 October 2019	10 March 2023	3 years, 147 days	12 years, 46 days
Ujjal Bhuyan		Telangana	17 October 2011	28 June 2022	13 July 2023^{[‡]}	1 year, 16 days	11 years, 270 days

=== Judges appointed as Acting Chief Justice ===
Name	Appointed as ACJ in HC of	Date of appointment as Judge	Period as Acting Chief Justice	Date of retirement	Tenure as ACJ	Tenure as Judge	Remarks	Ref..
T. V. Thadani	Gauhati	1948	8 Apr 1949 – 27 May 1951	21 November 1952	2 years, 50 days		Became permanent	
Ram Labhaya	Gauhati	3 January 1949	22 Nov 1952 – 9 Feb 1953	21 January 1957	80 days	8 years, 19 days	--	
M. C. Pathak	Gauhati	23 August 1967	10 Sep 1973 – 8 Jan 1974	30 June 1977	121 days	9 years, 312 days	Became permanent	
Baharul Islam	Gauhati	20 January 1972	11 Mar 1979 – 6 Jul 1979	1 March 1980	118 days	8 years, 42 days	Became permanent	
D. Pathak	Gauhati	8 August 1973	2 Mar 1980 – 17 Apr 1983	28 February 1986	3 years, 47 days	12 years, 205 days	Became permanent	
Kiranmoy Lahiri	Gauhati	19 November 1975	15 Nov 1984 – 29 Sep 1985	19 December 1986	319 days	11 years, 31 days	Became permanent	
K. N. Saikia	Gauhati	12 February 1979	20 Dec 1986 – 13 Jun 1987	29 February 1988	176 days	9 years, 18 days	Became permanent	
B. L. Hansaria	Gauhati	12 February 1979	16 Mar 1988 – 5 May 1988	13 December 1993^{[‡]}	51 days	14 years, 305 days	--	
Shafiqul Haque	Gauhati	10 January 1984	22 Mar 1991 – 19 Aug 1991	1 March 1992	151 days	8 years, 52 days	--	
R. K. Manisana Singh	Gauhati	21 November 1984	12 Dec 1993 – 26 Jan 1994	1 February 1994	46 days	9 years, 73 days	Became permanent	
S. N. Phukan	Gauhati	11 October 1985	2 Feb 1994 – 23 Apr 1994	27 January 1999^{[‡]}	81 days	13 years, 109 days	--	
Bhagwati Prasad Saraf	Bombay	2 January 1989	14 Feb 2000 – 20 Feb 2000	22 August 2001	1 year, 183 days	12 years, 233 days	Elevated as CJ of Jammu & Kashmir	
H. K. Sema	Gauhati	24 May 1989	5 Apr 2001 – 6 Jun 2001	8 April 2002^{[‡]}	63 days	12 years, 320 days	Transferred to Jammu & Kashmir	
H. K. Sema	Jammu & Kashmir	24 May 1989	23 Aug 2001 – 11 Sep 2001	8 April 2002^{[‡]}	20 days	12 years, 320 days	Became permanent	
M. K. Sharma	Delhi	10 January 1994	28 Nov 2006 – 3 Dec 2006	8 April 2008^{[‡]}	6 days	14 years, 90 days	Became permanent	
Nongthomban Surajmani Singh	Sikkim	29 January 1996	18 May 2003 – 8 Jul 2003	1 March 2008	52 days	12 years, 33 days	--	
Nongthomban Surajmani Singh	Sikkim	29 January 1996	24 Nov 2004 – 29 Sep 2005	1 March 2008	310 days	12 years, 33 days	--	
Nongthomban Surajmani Singh	Sikkim	29 January 1996	27 Dec 2006 – 26 Jan 2007	1 March 2008	31 days	12 years, 33 days	--	
Dinendra Biswas	Gauhati	31 October 1997	27 Aug 2004 – 20 May 2005	31 August 2007	267 days	9 years, 305 days	--	
Dinendra Biswas	Gauhati	31 October 1997	30 Sep 2005 – 4 Dec 2005	31 August 2007	66 days	9 years, 305 days	--	
Dinendra Biswas	Gauhati	31 October 1997	12 Jan 2007 – 2 May 2007	31 August 2007	111 days	9 years, 305 days	--	
Ranjan Gogoi	Gauhati	28 February 2001	17 Mar 2010 – 16 Apr 2010	22 April 2012^{[‡]}	31 days	11 years, 55 days	--	
Ranjan Gogoi	Gauhati	28 February 2001	18 Jun 2010 – 23 Jun 2010	22 April 2012^{[‡]}	6 days	11 years, 55 days	--	
Ranjan Gogoi	Punjab & Haryana	28 February 2001	4 Jan 2011 – 11 Feb 2011	22 April 2012^{[‡]}	39 days	11 years, 55 days	Became permanent	
Iqbal Ahmed Ansari	Patna	4 March 2002	13 Dec 2014 – 1 Jan 2015	28 October 2016	20 days	14 years, 239 days	--	
Iqbal Ahmed Ansari	Patna	4 March 2002	1 Aug 2015 – 28 Jul 2016	28 October 2016	363 days	14 years, 239 days	Became permanent	
T. Vaiphei	Gauhati	17 July 2003	21 Oct 2015 – 4 Mar 2016	28 February 2018	136 days	14 years, 227 days	--	
T. Vaiphei	Tripura	17 July 2003	16 May 2016 – 20 Sep 2016	28 February 2018	128 days	14 years, 227 days	Became permanent	
T. Nandakumar Singh	Meghalaya	25 November 2004	4 Aug 2013 – 19 Sep 2013	31 January 2016	47 days	11 years, 68 days	--	
T. Nandakumar Singh	Meghalaya	25 November 2004	13 Aug 2014 – 26 Aug 2014	31 January 2016	14 days	11 years, 68 days	--	
T. Nandakumar Singh	Meghalaya	25 November 2004	15 Jan 2016 – 31 Jan 2016	31 January 2016	17 days	11 years, 68 days	Retired as ACJ	
Hrishikesh Roy	Kerala	12 October 2006	30 May 2018 – 7 Aug 2018	21 September 2019^{[‡]}	70 days	12 years, 345 days	Became permanent	
A. K. Goswami	Gauhati	24 January 2011	6 Sep 2018 – 28 Oct 2018	10 March 2023	53 days	12 years, 46 days	--	
A. K. Goswami	Gauhati	24 January 2011	24 May 2019 – 6 Oct 2019	10 March 2023	136 days	12 years, 46 days	--	
Sudip Ranjan Sen	Meghalaya	6 February 2012	1 Feb 2016 – 23 Feb 2016	8 March 2019	24 days	7 years, 31 days	--	
Sudip Ranjan Sen	Meghalaya	6 February 2012	3 Mar 2018 – 20 May 2018	8 March 2019	79 days	7 years, 31 days	--	
L. Jamir	Gauhati	22 May 2013	9 Nov 2023 – 4 Feb 2024	28 February 2026	88 days	12 years, 283 days	--	
L. Jamir	Gauhati	22 May 2013	30 May 2025 – 20 Jul 2025	28 February 2026	52 days	12 years, 283 days	Transferred to Calcutta	
M. R. Pathak	Gujarat	22 May 2013	6 Oct 2026 – Incumbent	Incumbent	33 days	13 years, 170 days		

== Judges elevated to Supreme Court ==
This section includes the list of only those judges whose parent high court was Gauhati. This includes those judges who, at the time of elevation to Supreme Court of India, may not be serving in Gauhati High Court but this list does not include judges who at the time of elevation were serving in Gauhati High Court but does not have Gauhati as their Parent High Court.

Colour Key

- Female Judge
- Served as Chief Justice of India

Key

- ^{RES} Resigned
- ^{†} Died in office

#	Name of the Judge	Image	Date of Appointment		Date of Retirement	Tenure			Immediately preceding office
#	Name of the Judge	Image	In Parent High Court	In Supreme Court	Date of Retirement	In High Court(s)	In Supreme Court	Total tenure (Note: Includes both tenure as High Court Judge as well as Supreme Court Judge)	Immediately preceding office
1	Parbati Kumar Goswami		12 May 1967	10 September 1973	31 December 1977	6 years, 121 days	4 years, 113 days	10 years, 234 days	9th CJ of Gauhati HC
2	Baharul Islam		20 January 1972	4 December 1980 (Note: Retired as High Court Judge on 1 March 1980 before being elevated to Supreme Court of India)	12 January 1983^{[RES]}	8 years, 41 days	2 years, 40 days	10 years, 81 days	--
3	Khagendra Nath Saika		12 February 1979	14 December 1988 (Note: Retired as High Court Judge on 29 February 1988 before being elevated to Supreme Court of India)	28 February 1991	9 years, 18 days	2 years, 77 days	11 years, 95 days	--
4	Banwari Lal Hansaria		12 February 1979	14 December 1993	24 December 1996	14 years, 305 days	3 years, 11 days	17 years, 317 days	13th CJ of Orissa HC
5	Sailendu Nath Phukan		11 October 1985	28 January 1999	31 March 2002	13 years, 109 days	3 years, 63 days	16 years, 172 days	16th CJ of Orissa HC
6	Hotoi Khetoho Sema		24 May 1989	9 April 2002	1 June 2008	12 years, 320 days	6 years, 54 days	19 years, 9 days	21st CJ of Jammu & Kashmir HC
7	Mukundakam Sharma		10 January 1994	9 April 2008	17 September 2011	14 years, 90 days	3 years, 162 days	17 years, 251 days	24th CJ of Delhi HC
8	Ranjan Gogoi	Ranjan Gogoi	28 February 2001	23 April 2012	17 November 2019	11 years, 55 days	7 years, 209 days	18 years, 263 days	30th CJ of Punjab & Haryana HC
9	Amitava Roy		4 February 2002	27 February 2015	1 March 2018	13 years, 23 days	3 years, 3 days	16 years, 26 days	27tht CJ of Orissa HC
10	Hrishikesh Roy		12 October 2006	23 September 2019	31 January 2025	12 years, 346 days	5 years, 251 days	18 years, 112 days	35th CJ of Kerala HC
11	Ujjal Bhuyan		17 October 2011	14 July 2023	Incumbent	11 years, 270 days	3 years, 117 days	15 years, 22 days	5th CJ of Telangana HC

== See also ==
- High Courts of India
