= Parbati Kumar Goswami =

Indian judge (1913–1992)

Hon'ble Justice (Retd.) Parbati Kumar Goswami

Judge of Supreme Court of India
- In office 10 September 1973 – 31 December 1977
- Nominated by: Ajit Nath Ray
- Appointed by: V. V. Giri

9th Chief Justice of Gauhati High Court
- In office 31 January 1970 – 9 September 1973
- Nominated by: M. Hidayatullah
- Appointed by: V. V. Giri
- Preceded by: Sarat Kumar Datta
- Succeeded by: Mahendra Chandra Pathak

Judge of Gauhati High Court
- In office 12 May 1967 – 30 January 1970
- Nominated by: K. Subba Rao
- Appointed by: S. Radhakrishnan

Personal details
- Born: 1 January 1913 Dibrugarh, Assam
- Died: 1992 (aged 79)
- Education: B.A. and LL.B
- Alma mater: Cotton University, Earle Law College

Parbati Kumar Goswami (1 January 1913 – 1992) was an Indian jurist, who served as judge in Supreme Court of India. He also served as judge and later as the 9th Chief Justice of Gauhati High Court. He was the first Assamese judge on the bench of the Supreme Court of India.

== Early life ==
Goswami was born in 1913 in Assam, British India. His father was Bamdeb Goswami and mother's name Jogada Devi. He studied in English School at Sivasagar, passed B.A.(Hons.) from Cotton University with First Class and Gunabhiram Barooah Silver Medal and completed B.L from Earle Law College (now BRM Law College) of Gauhati.

== Career ==
Goswami joined bar and first started practise at Dibrugarh in 1938 then came to the Calcutta High Court and enrolled as advocate in 1943. He served as government pleader from 1947 to 1949. He was designated as senior advocate of the Supreme Court in 1953. He was the member of the State Law Commission. On 12 May 1967 Goswami was appointed as the Judge of the Assam and Nagaland High Court and thereafter became the chief justice of the same court. From December 1970 to January 1971 he took over the charge of the Governor of Assam and Nagaland. He was also an active member of World Association of Judges in Geneva. On 10 October 1973 Justice Goswami was elevated as justice of the Supreme Court of India and retired on 31 December 1977.
