= Mukundakam Sharma =

Indian judge (born 1946)

Judge of the Supreme Court of India
- In office 9 April 2008 – 17 September 2011
- Appointed by: Pratibha Patil

Chief Justice of the Delhi High Court
- In office 4 December 2006 – 9 April 2008
- Preceded by: Markandey Katju
- Succeeded by: Ajit Prakash Shah

Acting Chief Justice of the Delhi High Court
- In office 28 November 2006 – 4 December 2006

Judge of the Delhi High Court
- In office 12 February 1994 – 28 November 2006

Judge of the Patna High Court
- In office 14 February 1994 – 12 December 1994

Judge of the Gauhati High Court
- In office 10 January 1994 – 14 February 1994

Personal details
- Born: 18 September 1946 (age 80) Calcutta, Bengal Province, British India (Present-day West Bengal, India
- Education: Cotton College (pre-university); Ramjas College (BA); Gauhati University (MA, LLB, PhD)

Mukundakam Sharma (born 18 September 1946) is an Indian attorney and former judge. He served on the Supreme Court of India from 9 April 2008 till his retirement on 17 September 2011.

== Career ==
Sharma was enrolled as an advocate on 16 June 1970, and practiced in the Gauhati High Court in constitutional, service, civil, and taxation matters. He also worked as a panel and government advocate for the states of Assam and Manipur. He was the standing counsel for the state of Mizoram from 1981 to 1988 and Advocate General there from April 1988 to February 1989. He was designated as a senior advocate on the first day of 1988 and worked as Advocate General for Nagaland from April 1992 to January 1994. Throughout 1979 to 1992, he was a part-time law lecturer at University Law College, Gauhati University.

He was appointed a permanent judge of the Gauhati High Court on 10 January 1994, before transferring to the Patna High Court, on 14 February 1994, and then to the Delhi High Court, on 12 December 1994. Sharma served as acting Chief Justice of Delhi High Court, on 28 November 2006, and was assigned the position of the Chief Justice of Delhi High Court, on 4 December 2006.

He was appointed a judge of the Supreme Court of India on 9 April 2008, a post that he held until his retirement in 2011.
