= Hrishikesh Roy =

Indian judge (born 1960)

Hon'ble Justice (Retd.) Hrishikesh Roy
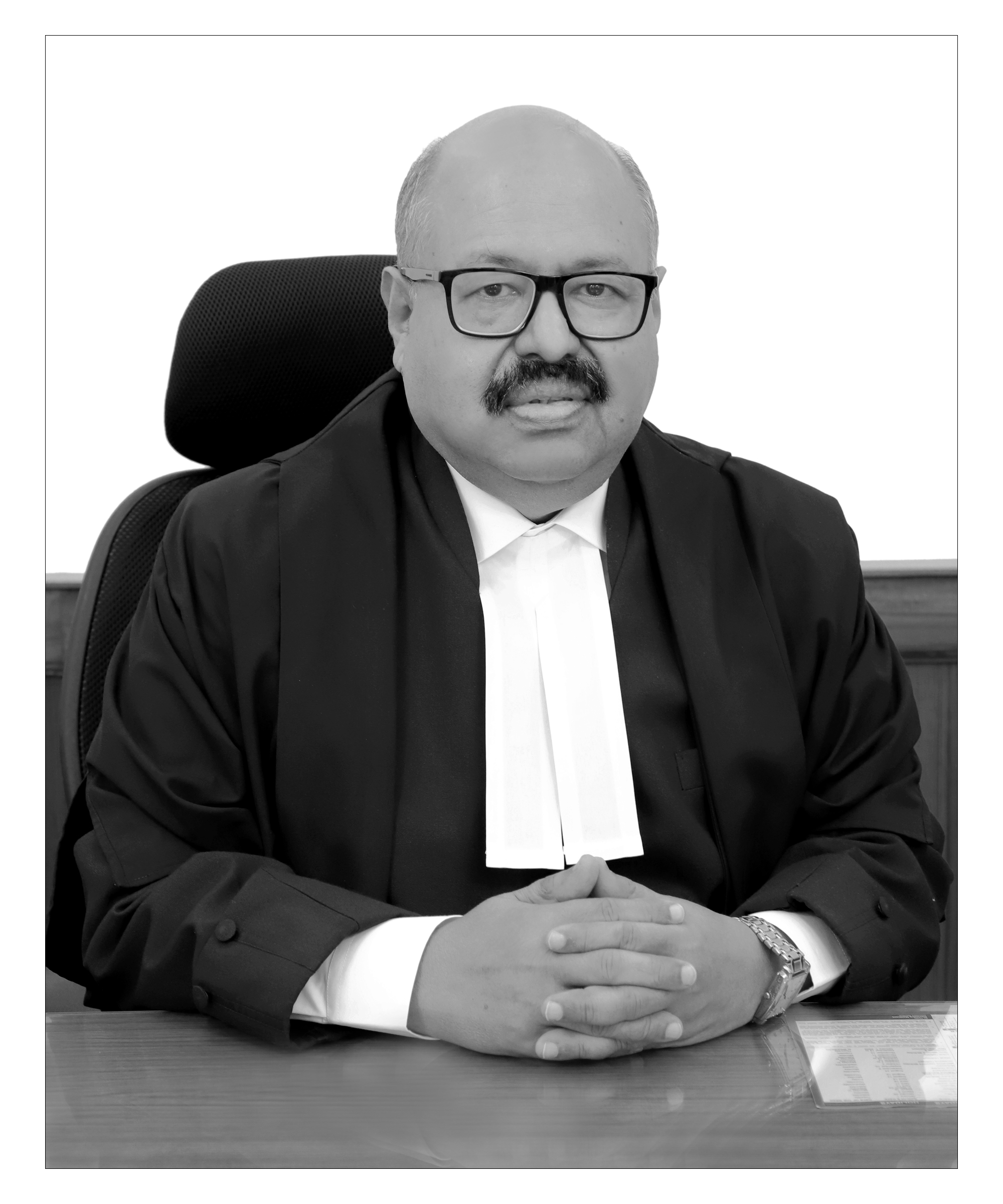

Judge of the Supreme Court of India
- In office 23 September 2019 – 31 January 2025
- Nominated by: Ranjan Gogoi
- Appointed by: Ram Nath Kovind

35th Chief Justice of the Kerala High Court
- In office 8 August 2018 – 22 September 2019; Acting CJ: 30 May 2018 – 7 August 2018
- Nominated by: Dipak Misra
- Appointed by: Ram Nath Kovind
- Preceded by: Antony Dominic
- Succeeded by: S. Manikumar

Judge of the Gauhati High Court
- In office 12 October 2006 – 29 May 2018
- Nominated by: Yogesh Kumar Sabharwal
- Appointed by: A. P. J. Abdul Kalam

Personal details
- Born: 1 February 1960 (age 66) Guwahati, Assam, India
- Education: University of Delhi
- Website: www.sci.gov.in

Hrishikesh Roy (born 1 February 1960) is a former judge of the Supreme Court of India. He is a former Chief Justice of the Kerala High Court and former judge of the Gauhati High Court.

== Career ==
In 1982, Roy earned a Bachelor of Arts from the University of Delhi. He was initially enrolled with the Bar Council of Delhi thereafter shifted to Guwahati. He served as the senior government advocate for the State of Arunachal Pradesh, standing counsel for the Assam State Electricity Board and Karbi Anglong Autonomous Council. He was designated as senior advocate of Gauhati High Court on 21 December 2004. Roy became an additional judge of Gauhati High Court on 12 October 2006 and permanent judge on 15 July 2008. In his career he was the Executive Head of the Assam State Legal Services Authority and nominated as a member of the National Judicial Academic Council presided by the Chief Justice of India.

== Chief justice of High Court ==
On 29 May 2018, Roy was transferred from the Gauhati High Court to Kerala High Court as the acting chief justice. He became the permanent chief justice of the High Court on 8 August 2018 after the retirement of Justice Antony Dominic.

== Supreme Court of India ==
He was elevated to the Supreme Court of India on 23 September 2019 and retired on 31 January 2025.
