= H. K. Sema =

Indian judge (born 1943)

Judge of the Supreme Court of India
- In office 2002–2008

Judge of the Gauhati High Court, Kohima Bench
- In office 1992–2001

Personal details
- Born: 1 June 1943 (age 83) Nagaland, India
- Education: St Joseph's College, Darjeeling (1967); Government Law College, Mumbai (1970)

Hotoi Khetoho Sema (born 1 June 1943) is an Indian jurist and former judge of the Supreme Court of India. He has also served as the chairperson of Uttar Pradesh Human Rights Commission. He is, till date, the only Supreme Court judge to be appointed from among the Scheduled Tribes, and the only Christian judge to be elevated to the top court from the North-Eastern states.

== Early life ==
Sema was born on 1 June 1943. He completed his graduation from St Joseph's College, Darjeeling in 1967 and a Bachelor of Laws from Government Law College, Mumbai in 1970.

== Posts held ==
- Junior Government Advocate, Nagaland in 1971-1975.
- Assistant Advocate General, Nagaland from 16 November 1985.
- Judge of Guwahati High Court, Kohima Bench, 1992-2001
- Judge of High Court of Jammu and Kashmir, 7 June 2001. Appointed Chief Justice of High Court of Jammu and Kashmir on 12 September 2001.
- Appointed as Chief Justice of Gujarat High Court on 25 January 2000.
- Elevated as Judge of the Supreme Court of India, 2002 to 2008.
- Chairperson of Uttar Pradesh Human Rights Commission.
