= Arindam Lodh =

Judge of Tripura High Court

Hon'ble Mr. Justice Arindam Lodh

Judge of Tripura High Court
- Incumbent
- Assumed office 7 May 2018
- Nominated by: Dipak Misra
- Appointed by: Ram Nath Kovind

Personal details
- Born: 25 March 1963 (age 63)

Justice Arindam Lodh (born 25 March 1963) is a retired Indian judge of the High Court of Tripura. He retired in March 2025.

== Career ==
Lodh enrolled with the Bar in 1988 and practised at the Agartala Bench of the Gauhati High Court. After the establishment of the full-fledged Tripura High Court in 2013, he continued to appear there till his elevation to the Bench. Lodh represented the Indian Oil Corporation, Khadi and Village Industries Commission, Northeast Frontier Railways and Prasar Bharati as their Standing Counsel at different times in his legal journey. He was also on the panel of lawyers for the Union Public Service Commission for Tripura region. In 2009, Government of India appointed him as Assistant Solicitor General for the Agartala Bench of the Gauhati High Court and a senior panel Counsel. He specializes in Civil, Constitutional, Criminal, Intellectual Property, Labour, Service and Tax law.

A Supreme Court Collegium consisting of Justices Dipak Misra CJI, Jasti Chelameswar and Ranjan Gogoi recommended to the President of India in November 2017 that Lodh be made a Judge of the Tripura High Court. This was done overruling the Indian Intelligence Bureau's seemingly adverse comments about his professional competence. Lodh assumed charge of his office on 7 May 2018. The oath was administered to him by the then Chief Justice Ajay Rastogi.

== Notable judgements ==
- In January 2020, a division bench with Chief Justice Akil Kureshi and Lodh on it declared that the heritage building Neermahal at Melaghar belongs to the Government of Tripura and not the erstwhile royal Manikya family.
- A division bench consisting of Chief Justice Sanjay Karol and Lodh ruled in October 2019 that the practice of offering animal sacrifices in temples of Tripura is unconstitutional. This verdict came in a petition focussing on the tradition of sacrificing buffaloes, goats and pigeons in the Tripureswari temple.
