= S. Vaidyanathan =

12th Chief Justice of Meghalaya High Court

Hon'ble Chief Justice (Retd.) S. Vaidyanathan
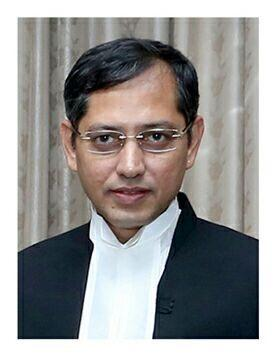

12th Chief Justice of Meghalaya High Court
- In office 11 February 2024 – 16 August 2024
- Nominated by: D. Y. Chandrachud
- Appointed by: Droupadi Murmu
- Preceded by: Sanjib Banerjee; H. S. Thangkhiew (acting)
- Succeeded by: I. P. Mukerji; H. S. Thangkhiew (acting)

Judge of Madras High Court
- In office 25 October 2013 – 10 February 2024
- Nominated by: P. Sathasivam
- Appointed by: Pranab Mukherjee
- Acting Chief Justice
- In office 25 May 2023 – 27 May 2023
- Appointed by: Droupadi Murmu
- Preceded by: M. N. Bhandari; M. Duraiswamy (acting); T. Raja (acting)
- Succeeded by: S. V. Gangapurwala

Personal details
- Born: 17 August 1962 (age 64) Coimbatore, Tamil Nadu
- Education: DG Vaishnav College, (B.A.), Madras Law College (LL.B)

S. Vaidyanathan (born 17 August 1962) is a retired Indian Judge, who served as the 12th Chief Justice of Meghalaya High Court in 2024. He has previously served as a Judge and Acting Chief Justice of the Madras High Court.

== Family ==
S. Vaidyanathan was born on 17 August 1962 in Coimbatore, Tamil Nadu. His father, V. Subramanian, began his working life as a shoe-polish seller and later became trade unionist. He was a founding member of the Madras Commercial Employees Union, established in 1946, by Ramaswamy Venkataraman. He also served as an editor of labour-law books published by Madras Book Agency. His paternal grandfather, L. S. Vaidyanathan, worked as a Superintendent in the Copyist Section of the Madras High Court and retired in 1952.

== Education ==
Vaidyanathan completed his schooling at Singaram Pillai High School in Villivakkam, Chennai. He graduated with B.A. in economics from DG Vaishnav College in 1982 and completed his LL.B from Madras Law College in 1985. He also did Post Graduate Diploma in Personal Management, Labour Welfare and Industrial Relations in 1986. Vaidyanathan enrolled as an advocate on 27 August 1986. He practised before the Madras High Court and various tribunals. He practiced mainly in labour, service, criminal and company matters.

== Career ==
Vaidyanathan was elevated as an Additional Judge of the Madras High Court on 25 October 2013 along with R. Mahadevan, who later became judge of Supreme Court of India. On 14 April 2015, he was appointed a permanent Judge of the Court. During his ten years tenure in Madras High Court, he authored 1,219 reported judgments. In May 2023, he was appointed as Acting Chief Justice of Madras High Court for a brief period of three days between retirement of Acting Chief Justice T. Raja and appointment of Sanjay V. Gangapurwala.

In November 2023, Supreme Court collegium led by CJI Dhananjaya Y. Chandrachud recommended his elevation as Chief Justice of Meghalaya High Court and government cleared his appointment in February 2024. He was sworn in as Chief Justice of Meghalaya High Court on 11 February 2024. He retired in August 2024.

In July 2023, Supreme Court collegium recommended elevation of R. Mahadevan to Supreme Court of India by superseding two senior judges of Madras High Court including Vaidyanathan and T. S. Sivagnanam. This fact was acknowledged by collegium in its resolution.
