= P. Sam Koshy =

Indian judge (born 1967)

Hon'ble Justice Puthichira Sam Koshy

35th Chief Justice of Delhi High Court
- Nominee
- Assuming office TBD
- Nominated by: Surya Kant
- Succeeding: D. K. Upadhyaya; N. W. Sambre (acting)

Judge of Telangana High Court
- Incumbent
- Assumed office 27 July 2023
- Nominated by: D. Y. Chandrachud
- Appointed by: Droupadi Murmu
- Acting Chief Justice
- Assumed office 6 October 2026
- Appointed by: Droupadi Murmu
- Preceded by: Aparesh Kumar Singh
- Succeeded by: Tapabrata Chakraborty
- In office 18 July 2025 – 19 July 2025
- Appointed by: Droupadi Murmu
- Preceded by: Alok Aradhe; Sujoy Paul (acting)
- Succeeded by: Aparesh Kumar Singh

Judge of Chhattisgarh High Court
- In office 16 Septemeber 2013 – 26 July 2023
- Nominated by: P. Sathasivam
- Appointed by: Pranab Mukherjee

Personal details
- Born: 30 April 1967 (age 59)
- Education: G. S. College of Commerce and Economics (B.Com), Rani Durgavati Vishwavidyalaya (LL.B)

Hon'ble Sri Justice Puthichira Sam Koshy is an Indian jurist presently serving as Acting Chief Justice of the High Court for the State of Telangana. He previously served as a Judge of the Chhattisgarh High Court from September 2013 to July 2023. On 27 July 2023, he took oath as a Judge of the High Court for the State of Telangana. He was appointed Acting Chief Justice of the High Court for the State of Telangana by the President of India for two days, from 18 July 2025 to 19 July 2025.

Justice Koshy serves as the Executive Chairman of the Telangana State Legal Services Authority (TGSLSA), having been nominated to the post by the Governor of Telangana from 27 July 2023 to 25 March 2024, and again from 1 July 2025 onwards.

In December 2025, he was appointed as a Member of the Central Authority of the National Legal Services Authority (NALSA) by the Ministry of Law and Justice.

In March 2026, the Chief Justice of India, the Patron-in-Chief of NALSA, in consultation with the Executive Chairman of NALSA, nominated Justice Koshy as Chairman of a high-level NALSA committee constituted to revisit the Legal Aid Defense Counsel System (LADCS) Scheme.

== Early life and education ==
Justice Koshy was born on 30 April 1967. He completed his schooling at St. Aloysius Senior Secondary School, Jabalpur. He pursued undergraduate studies in commerce and earned a Bachelor of Commerce (B.Com.) degree in 1987 from G. S. College of Commerce and Economics, Jabalpur. He subsequently studied law at Rani Durgavati Vishwavidyalaya, Jabalpur (formerly the University of Jabalpur), Madhya Pradesh, graduating with a Bachelor of Laws (LL.B.) degree in 1990.

== Legal career ==
=== Practice at the Bar ===
Justice Koshy enrolled as an advocate on 9 March 1991. He practised civil, constitutional, service and labour law before the Madhya Pradesh High Court at Jabalpur until October 2000. Following the formation of the state of Chhattisgarh in November 2000, he shifted his practice to the Chhattisgarh High Court at Bilaspur, where he practised until his elevation to the bench in September 2013.

During his legal practice, he served in various state law officer positions, including Government Advocate at the Chhattisgarh High Court from 2002 to 2004 and Deputy Advocate General for the state of Chhattisgarh from 2005 to 2006. He also served as standing counsel and legal adviser to several statutory boards, financial institutions and public sector undertakings (PSUs).

== Judicial career ==
He was elevated as an Additional Judge of the Chhattisgarh High Court on 16 September 2013 and was appointed as a Permanent Judge on 8 March 2016.

On 10 July 2023, the Supreme Court Collegium recommended his transfer to the Telangana High Court, stating that his appointment would enrich the composition of the High Court. He took oath as a Judge of the High Court for the State of Telangana on 27 July 2023.

In July 2025, the President of India, exercising powers under Article 223 of the Constitution of India, appointed Justice Koshy as Acting Chief Justice of the High Court for the State of Telangana.

He was again appointed Acting Chief Justice of the High Court for the State of Telangana on 6 October 2026 and continues to hold the position.

== Academic and university governing bodies ==
Justice Koshy has been associated with academic governance and institutional administration at various legal educational institutions.

=== NALSAR University of Law ===
He serves as a member of the General Council and the Academic Council of NALSAR University of Law, Hyderabad.

=== Hidayatullah National Law University ===
He previously served as a member of the Academic Council of Hidayatullah National Law University (HNLU), Raipur, and currently serves as a member of its General Council.

=== Mahindra University School of Law ===
He serves as a member of the Board of Studies of the Mahindra University School of Law, Hyderabad.

== Legal services and institutional leadership ==
=== Telangana State Legal Services Authority ===
Justice Koshy was nominated by the Governor of Telangana as Executive Chairman of the Telangana State Legal Services Authority (TGSLSA). He served his first term from 27 July 2023 to 25 March 2024 and was subsequently nominated for a second term with effect from 1 July 2025.

=== National Legal Services Authority ===
==== Central Authority ====
In December 2025, Justice Koshy was appointed by the Ministry of Law and Justice as a member of the Central Authority of the National Legal Services Authority (NALSA).

==== Committee on the Legal Aid Defense Counsel System ====
In March 2026, the Chief Justice of India, in his capacity as Patron-in-Chief of NALSA, in consultation with the Executive Chairman of NALSA, nominated Justice Koshy as chairman of a high-level committee constituted to review and revisit the Legal Aid Defense Counsel System (LADCS) Scheme.

Alma Mater : St. Aloysius Senior Secondary School, Jabalpur; G.S. College of Commerce and Economics, Jabalpur; Rani Durgavati Vishwavidyalaya, Jabalpur

== Education ==
- St. Aloysius Senior Secondary School, Jabalpur
- G. S. College of Commerce and Economics, Jabalpur
- Rani Durgavati Vishwavidyalaya, Jabalpur

In July 2025, he was appointed as Acting Chief Justice from 18 July 2025. On 6 October 2026, he was again appointed as Acting Chief Justice of Telangana High Court following elevation of Chief Justice Aparesh Kumar Singh to Supreme Court of India.

On 26 October 2026, Supreme Court collegium recommended his elevation as Chief Justice of Delhi High Court.

== Outreach and lectures ==
He is a frequent visitor to the National Judicial Academy at Bhopal as a “Resource Person” addressing the Hon’ble Judges from across the country as also the District Judges from across the country on various topics and subjects.

Delivered the guest lecture on “Access to Justice: Impact and Challenges" organized by the Legal Aid Society of ICFAI Law School (IFHE), Hyderabad on 7th February, 2026.

Restorative Justice & Prison Welfare: Spearheaded institutional support for under trial legal aid, review of bail compliances, and rehabilitation infrastructure, including specialized de-addiction facilities for inmates at Chanchalguda Central Jail.

He presided over constitutional and administrative law matters, deciding various writ petitions and other legal proceedings.
