= Indrajit Mahanty =

6th Chief Justice of Tripura High Court

Hon'ble Chief Justice (Retd.) Indrajit Mahanty
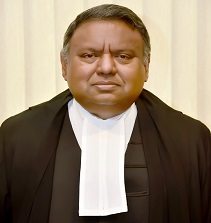

6th Chief Justice of Tripura High Court
- In office 12 October 2021 – 10 November 2022
- Nominated by: N. V. Ramana
- Appointed by: Ram Nath Kovind
- Preceded by: Akil Kureshi
- Succeeded by: Jaswant Singh; T. A. Goud (acting)

37th Chief Justice of Rajasthan High Court
- In office 6 October 2019 – 11 October 2021
- Nominated by: Ranjan Gogoi
- Appointed by: Ram Nath Kovind
- Preceded by: S. Ravindra Bhat; Mohammad Rafiq (acting)
- Succeeded by: Akil Kureshi

Judge of Bombay High Court
- In office 14 November 2018 – 5 October 2019
- Nominated by: Ranjan Gogoi
- Appointed by: Ram Nath Kovind

Judge of Orissa High Court
- In office 31 March 2006 – 13 November 2018
- Nominated by: Y. K. Sabharwal
- Appointed by: A. P. J. Abdul Kalam
- Acting Chief Justice
- In office 7 August 2018 – 11 August 2018
- Appointed by: Ram Nath Kovind
- Preceded by: Vineet Saran
- Succeeded by: K. S. Jhaveri

Personal details
- Born: 11 November 1960 (age 65) Cuttack, Odisha, India
- Education: B.Com, LL.B and LL.M
- Alma mater: Ravenshaw College, Delhi University, Cambridge University

Indrajit Mahanty (born 11 November 1960) is a retired Indian judge. He is a former Chief Justice of Tripura High Court and Rajasthan High Court and judge of Bombay High Court and Orissa High Court.

== Early life and education ==
He was born on 11 November 1960 at Cuttack, Orissa to late Ranjit Mahanty, Barrister at Law and advocate Shakuntala Mahanty. He completed his schooling from Mount Hermon School, Darjeeling, and graduation in B.Com (Hons.) from Ravenshaw College, Cuttack. He did his LL.B. from Campus Law Center, Delhi University, and LL.M. from the University of Cambridge.

== Career ==
He enrolled as an advocate with Orissa State Council in 1984, and started legal practice under his father late Barrister Ranjit Mahanty till his death in the year 1989. After death of his father he started independent practice in the field of Commercial Law, Arbitration, Taxation, Civil and Criminal, Writs & Service Law in the Civil Court, Orissa High Court and the Supreme Court of India, he even conducted few arbitration proceedings at London.

He was elevated as Judge of Orissa High Court on 31 March 2006 and served as its acting chief justice in 2018. Thereafter, transferred to Bombay High Court and took oath as a Judge of the Bombay High Court on 14 November 2018.

He was elevated and appointed as Chief Justice of Rajasthan High Court on 6 October 2019 while serving as its chief justice he was tested positive for covid-19 which led to suspension of work in high court. He was transferred to Tripura High Court and took oath as the Chief Justice of High Court of Tripura on 12 October 2021.

== Corruption charges ==
In September 2016, RTI activist Jayant Kumar Das made allegation of corruption and abuse of office against justice Mahanty and Sangam Kumar Sahoo, both sitting judges of Orissa High Court and made formal complaint to the then CJI T. S. Thakur. Allegation against Mahanty was that he engaged in hotel business while being sitting judge of high court violating code of conduct for judges as well as using his office to secure loan of 2.5 crores from State Bank of India and other charges of conflict of interest when he had passed orders to allow women to be employed in bars and restaurant while allegedly owning a bar which employed women.

Based on complaint, then CJI Thakur constituted an in-house committee consisting of the then Punjab and Haryana chief justice Shiavax Jal Vazifdar, Tripura High Court chief justice T. Vaiphei and Karnataka High Court judge Syed Abdul Nazeer. the panel was reconstituted several times on account of elevation and retirement of members. In 2017, panel halted its proceedings when the name of sitting senior judge of Supreme Court of India cropped up in enquiry proceedings resumed again after Dipak Misra took over as CJI in August 2017. Panel was reconstituted final time when the then Madras High Court chief justice Indira Banerjee was appointed as chairperson and the panel closed its enquiry in August 2018.
