= Sanjib Banerjee =

11th Chief Justice of Meghalaya High Court

Hon'ble Chief Justice (Retd.) Sanjib Banerjee

11th Chief Justice of Meghalaya High Court
- In office 24 November 2021 – 1 November 2023
- Nominated by: N. V. Ramana
- Appointed by: Ram Nath Kovind
- Preceded by: R. V. More; H. S. Thangkhiew (acting)
- Succeeded by: S. Vaidyanathan; H. S. Thangkhiew (acting)

42nd Chief Justice of Madras High Court
- In office 4 January 2021 – 16 November 2021
- Nominated by: Sharad Arvind Bobde
- Appointed by: Ram Nath Kovind
- Preceded by: A. P. Sahi; Vineet Kothari (acting)
- Succeeded by: M. N. Bhandari; M. Duraiswamy (acting)

Judge of Calcutta High Court
- In office 22 June 2006 – 3 January 2021
- Nominated by: Y. K. Sabharwal
- Appointed by: A. P. J. Abdul Kalam

Personal details
- Born: 2 November 1961 (age 64)
- Education: St. Paul's School, Darjeeling; University of Calcutta (B.Sc Honours and LL.B)

Sanjib Banerjee (born 2 November 1961) is a retired Indian judge who served as the Chief Justice of Meghalaya High Court and of Madras High Court. He is also a former judge of the Calcutta High Court.

== Education and career ==
Banerjee was born on 2 November 1961. He received his early education at St. Xavier’s Collegiate School in Calcutta and St. Paul’s School in Darjeeling. He completed a Bachelor of Science degree with Honours in Economics from the University of Calcutta in 1983 and obtained his Bachelor of Laws degree from the same university in 1986–87. Before becoming a judge, he also reportedly worked as a sports journalist at The Telegraph. Banerjee enrolled as an advocate on 21 November 1990 and practised primarily before the Calcutta High Court, while also appearing before the Supreme Court of India, other High Courts and tribunals. His principal areas of practice included civil law, company law, arbitration and constitutional law, with particular specialisation in corporate and intellectual property matters. On 22 June 2006, he was appointed a permanent judge of the Calcutta High Court. During his long tenure there, he dealt with cases across numerous branches of law, including significant public-interest litigation.

== Chief justiceship ==
Banerjee assumed office as the 42nd Chief Justice of the Madras High Court on 4 January 2021 succeeding Amreshwar Pratap Sahi. His tenure coincided with the second wave of the COVID-19 pandemic, when courts faced urgent questions concerning public health, government preparedness, electoral accountability and access to essential resources. He headed proceedings in which the court scrutinised the Union and state governments' handling of the pandemic, including the availability and equitable distribution of oxygen, vaccines and medicines. The court also examined the Election Commission of India's failure to ensure compliance with COVID-19 protocols during election rallies. In April 2021, Banerjee made the widely reported observation that election officials might face murder charges for their role in permitting rallies amid the pandemic. The Supreme Court subsequently described the remarks as harsh and the metaphor as inappropriate, while noting that the observations were not part of the formal order under challenge.

His tenure also involved significant questions concerning freedom of expression, secularism, privacy and the accountability of public authorities. A bench led by him directed an inquiry into allegations that Aadhaar-related information had been used for political campaign messaging in Puducherry. The court also stayed the operation of certain provisions of the Information Technology Rules, 2021, concerning the regulation of digital news publishers and online content platforms, in proceedings addressing freedom of speech and media independence. In another matter, the court emphasised secularism and religious tolerance while rejecting a petition seeking to require the Tamil Nadu Chief Minister to profess Hindu faith to head committees under the Hindu Religious and Charitable Endowments Act.

== Transfer and controversy ==
In September 2021, the Supreme Court Collegium recommended Banerjee's transfer from the Madras High Court to the Meghalaya High Court. The recommendation became public in November, and the Union government notified the transfer on 15 November 2021. He assumed office as Chief Justice of the Meghalaya High Court on 24 November 2021. The timing of the transfer prompted concern that it might have been connected to Banerjee's judicial interventions in matters involving the government and public institutions. During the COVID-19 crisis, his court scrutinised the handling of oxygen, medicines and vaccines. He also made forceful observations about the Election Commission of India's responsibility for allowing large election rallies during the pandemic. These interventions had brought his judicial approach to public attention shortly before the transfer recommendation became public.

The response from the legal community was unusually strong. The Madras Bar Association passed a resolution expressing concern about the opacity surrounding the transfer and urged the Collegium to reconsider its recommendation. Thirty-one senior advocates submitted a representation stating that they could not understand the reasons for the sudden transfer. Separately, 237 advocates from the Madras High Court wrote to the Collegium, raising concerns about the implications of such transfers for judicial independence. Lawyers also staged a silent protest in Chennai. Retired Madras High Court judge K. Chandru argued that, without an explanation from the Collegium, the transfer could reasonably be perceived as punitive.

== Retirement ==
Banerjee retired on 1 November 2023, having served as a High Court judge for approximately seventeen years. His time in Meghalaya was considerably less controversial in public discussion than his transfer from Madras, but it included substantive work on road connectivity, sanitation, environmental protection, the jurisdiction of criminal courts and the interpretation of the POCSO Act. On 16 March 2024, in an interview with Bar & Bench, he made a much more explicit allegation about why he believed he had been transferred. He said that he had reported allegedly corrupt judges to the Chief Justice of India, supported by evidence, and that those judges had influential connections. According to him, this was the real reason for his transfer, rather than his controversial remarks about the Election Commission during the COVID-19 pandemic. He described corruption in the higher judiciary as a serious institutional problem and argued that removing a judge through a transfer would not, by itself, adequately address judicial corruption.
