= Wildlife First v. Union of India =

Case examining the constitutional validity of the Forest Rights Act 2006.

- Court: Supreme Court of India
- Full case name: Wildlife First & Ors v. Ministry Of Forest And Environment & Ors.
- Started: 19 February 2019
- Citation: WP (C) 109/2008

Court membership
- Judges sitting: Arun Mishra, Navin Sinha, Indira Banerjee

Wildlife First v. Union of India., WP (C) 109/2008, is an ongoing Supreme Court of India case examining the constitutional validity of the Forest Rights Act 2006. The case was brought by Wildlife First, Nature Conservation Society and the Tiger Research and Conservation Trust in 2008 contending that the Act had led to deforestation and encroachment in conflict with other forest and wildlife protection legislations like the Wildlife (Protection) Act of 1972 and the Forest Conservation Act of 1980. The case has attracted wide attention for its potential impact on the rights of tribal and forest-dwelling communities across the country.
