= Priyadarshini free travel scheme =

Free bus travel scheme for women in Kerala, India

- Type of project: Free public transport
- Country: India
- Ministry: Transport Department, Government of Kerala
- Launched: 15 June 2026; 3 months ago
- Budget: ₹600 crore (US$62 million) (2026–27)
- Status: Active

Priyadarshini is a scheme of the Government of Kerala, India, under which women and transgender persons travel free on ordinary-class buses operated by the Kerala State Road Transport Corporation (KSRTC). The state Transport Department issued the order on 11 June 2026 and the scheme took effect on 15 June. It applies to all women and transgender persons irrespective of age, and the state meets the cost.

There is no application, registration or identity document. A conductor issues a zero-fare ticket on request, recording the boarding and destination points.

Chief Minister V. D. Satheesan inaugurated the scheme on 15 June 2026, and a revised state budget presented four days later set aside ₹600 crore for it. KSRTC recorded 3.81 crore free journeys in the first month.

== Background ==
Free bus travel for women was among the promises the United Democratic Front called the Indira Guarantees in its manifesto for the 2026 Kerala Legislative Assembly election, which the alliance won. In the revised budget speech of 19 June 2026, Satheesan said the government had already implemented two of the six guarantees, free travel for women and transgender persons and the creation of a department for the welfare of the elderly, and that the travel order had been issued at the first cabinet meeting after the government took office.

== Provisions ==
Under this scheme, travel is free on every category of KSRTC ordinary service, with no limit on distance. City Fast and Fast Passenger services, higher classes, festival specials, weekend additional services and chartered trips fall outside the scheme. Eligibility does not depend on age, income, social status or place of residence, and no card or prior enrolment is needed.

At the launch the government put the revenue foregone at ₹65 crore to ₹70 crore a month, or roughly ₹800 crore a year, and said it would set up a dedicated cash-transfer and financial-management mechanism so that KSRTC could meet its operating costs.

== Usage ==
Transport Minister C. P. John released figures when the scheme completed a month. KSRTC had carried 3.81 crore passengers free of charge, and the share of women among passengers on ordinary services had risen from 50.9 per cent to 66 per cent.

== Legal challenge ==
A public interest petition argued that the scheme breached Articles 14 and 15 of the Constitution of India, on the ground that affluent women travelled free while poorer male passengers continued to pay fares. A bench of Chief Justice Soumen Sen and Justice Syam Kumar V. M. of the Kerala High Court dismissed the petition on 22 June 2026, holding that there was nothing to show the government order was contrary to statutory norms, perverse or illegal.

== Reception ==
Priyanka Gandhi said the Congress-led UDF government had turned an Indira Guarantee into reality, and that the scheme was "more than a bus pass. It is the freedom to travel, the confidence to pursue opportunities, and greater independence for women across Keralam."

Private bus operators protested that this scheme would cause loss of their revenue. On 13 July 2026 the government constituted a committee under the former Transport Commissioner K. Padmakumar, with B. G. Sreedevi, formerly of the National Transportation Planning and Research Centre, as vice-chairperson, to assess the operators' complaints and report within six weeks.

== See also ==
- Free public transport
- Kerala State Road Transport Corporation
- Satheesan ministry
