= Satya Gopal Chattopadhyay =

Judge of Tripura High Court

Hon'ble Mr. Justice (Retd.) Satya Gopal Chattopadhyay

Judge of Tripura High Court
- In office 6 March 2020 – 31 December 2022
- Nominated by: Sharad Arvind Bobde
- Appointed by: Ram Nath Kovind

Personal details
- Born: 1 January 1961 (age 65)

Justice Satya Gopal Chattopadhyay (born 25 March 1963) is an Indian former judge of the High Court of Tripura from March 2020 until his retirement on 31 December 2022.

== Career ==
Chattopadhyay obtained a law degree from the University College of Law, Calcutta in 1988 and enrolled with the Bar in the same year. He joined the Judicial Service of Tripura state as a Munsiff Magistrate in July 1991. Prior to his elevation to the High Court Bench, Chattopadhyay had also been the Member Secretary of Tripura State Legal Services Authority, Registrar (Vigilance) as well as the Registrar General of the Court. In February 2020, the Collegium of the Supreme Court of India recommended his name to the President of India for appointment as a Judge of the Tripura High Court. Chattopadhyay took his oath of office on 6 March 2020 which was administered to him by Chief Justice Akil Kureshi.

== Notable judgements ==
- In March 2021, a division bench consisting of Justices Akil Kureshi and Chattopadhyay reminded the Tripura State police of their duty to notify the informants of action taken when their investigation in a case is complete.
- A single bench with Chattopadhyay on it ruled in January 2021 that a man cannot be absolved of his duty to provide for the maintenance of his ex-wife and children on the sole grounds of his financial inability to pay.
