= Nagaland Lokayukta =

Parliamentary ombudsman in India

Agency overview
- Formed: 2017

Jurisdictional structure
- Federal agency: India
- Operations jurisdiction: India
- General nature: Federal law enforcement

Operational structure
- Headquarters: Nagaland Lokayukta, New Secretariat Road, Thizama, Nagaland 797003.
- Agency executive: Mayang Lima., Upa-Lokayukta.

Website
- https://lokayukta.nagaland.gov.in/

Nagaland Lokayukta is the Parliamentary Ombudsman for the state of Nagaland (India). It is a high level statutory functionary, created to address grievances of the public against ministers, legislators, administration and public servants in issues related to misuse of power, mal-administration and corruption. It was first formed under the Nagaland Lokayukta and Deputy Lokayukta Act-2014 and approved by the president of India. The Lokpal and Lokayuktas Act, 2013 adopted by Parliament had come into force on 16 January 2014 and required each state to appoint its Lokayukta within a year. As per the law, the Lokayukta bench should consist of judicial and non-judicial members. An Upa-Lokayukta is a deputy to the Lokayukta and assists in her or his work and acts as the in-charge Lokayukta if the position falls vacant before time.

A Lokayukta of the state is appointed to office by the state Governor after consulting the committee consisting of State Chief Minister, Speaker of Legislative Assembly, Leader of Opposition, or leader of largest opposition party in State Legislature, Chairman of Legislative Council and Leader of Opposition of Legislative Council and cannot be removed from office except for reasons specified in the Act and will serve the period of five years.

== History and administration ==
The Nagaland Lokayukta Bill, 2017 was passed in the Nagaland Assembly and was effective from 2017. Nagaland Government was recommended by the Supreme Court of India to appoint its first Lokayukta within three months in February 2019. In September 2021, Nagaland Lokayukta (Amendment No.2) Bill, 2021 was returned by Nagaland Governor RN Ravi to the state Legislative Assembly extending the time frame to appoint State Lokayukta after the resignation of first Lokayukta for the state Mr.Uma Nath Singh. Provision regarding filling the post in Nagaland Lokayukta says that "The Nagaland Lokayukta Act, 2017": "A vacancy occurring in the office of the Lokayukta or Upa-Lokayukta by reason of his/her death, resignation, retirement or removal shall be filled in as soon as possible, but not later than six months from the date of occurrence of such vacancy."

== Oath or affirmation ==
"I, <name>, having been appointed Lokayukta (or Upa-Lokayukta) do swear in the name of God (or solemnly affirm) that I will bear faith and allegiance to the Constitution of India as by law established and I will duly and faithfully and to the best of my ability, knowledge and judgment perform the duties of my office without fear or favour, affection or ill-will."

— First Schedule, Nagaland Lokayukta and Deputy Lokayukta Act-2014

== Powers ==
Nagaland Lokayukta has complete and exclusive authority for enquiring into allegations or complaints against the State Chief Minister, State Deputy Chief Minister, Ministers of the state Government, Leader of Opposition and Government officials. Lokayukta Act of the state which serves as its tool against corruption covers Chief Ministers, ex-Chief Ministers, Government officials, Ministers, IAS officers and all public servants including from local administration, police, customs and heads of companies, and societies, trusts which are partly funded by state or centre.

== Appointment and tenure ==
Nagaland Lokayukta got its first Lokayukta as Justice Uma Nath Singh, a former Chief Justice of Meghalaya High Court from 13 March 2019 and will hold office for a term of five years or attaining the age of 70 years whichever is earlier. In January 2021, the Lokayukta offered to resign. Mr. Uma Nath Singh resigned the position of Nagaland Lokayukta in Feb'2021. The Supreme Court of India subsequent to the resignation of Nagaland Lokayukta transferred the duties and powers of latter to Nagaland Upa-Lokayukta Mayang Lima.

== Notable cases ==
In 2020, Nagaland Lokayukta, in a complaint relating to abuse of power in manipulating the results of Nagaland Public Service Commission (NPSC) examination against Deputy Chief Minister Y Patton filed by a former student union leader, had dismissed the case.

In 2020, Nagaland Lokayukta in a complaint relating to issue of work order for a project missing technical approval and hurried sanction of funds in short time, issued prosecution orders against two retired Indian Administrative Service (IAS) officers, who were former managing director (MD) of SFAC-N and former agriculture production commissioner and chairman of Small Farmers Agri-business Consortium-Nagaland (SFAC-N).

== See also ==
- Lokpal and Lokayukta Act 2013
