= Jaswant Singh (judge) =

7th Chief Justice of Tripura High Court

Hon'ble Chief Justice (Retd.) Jaswant Singh
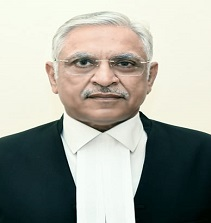

7th Chief Justice of Tripura High Court
- In office 15 February 2023 – 22 February 2023
- Nominated by: D. Y. Chandrachud
- Appointed by: Droupadi Murmu
- Preceded by: Indrajit Mahanty; T. A. Goud (acting)
- Succeeded by: Aparesh Kumar Singh; T. A. Goud (acting)

Judge of Orissa High Court
- In office 8 October 2021 – 14 February 2023
- Nominated by: N. V. Ramana
- Appointed by: Ram Nath Kovind

Judge of Punjab & Haryana High Court
- In office 5 December 2007 – 7 October 2021
- Nominated by: K. G. Balakrishnan
- Appointed by: Pratibha Patil

Personal details
- Born: 23 February 1961 (age 65) Rohtak, Haryana
- Education: LL.B and MBA
- Alma mater: Maharshi Dayanand University

Jaswant Singh (born 23 February 1961) is an Indian judge. He is a former Chief Justice of Tripura High Court and Judge of Orissa High Court and Punjab and Haryana High Court.

== Career ==
Born on 23 February 1961 at Rohtak, Haryana. He graduated in arts in 1980. He took his Law degree and Master of Business Administration from Maharshi Dayanand University. He was enrolled as an Advocate in the year 1986. In 1988, he started his practice in Punjab and Haryana High Court. He has served as the Additional Advocate General in the office of Advocate General, Haryana. He was elevated as Judge of Punjab and Haryana High Court on 5 December 2007. He was transferred as Judge of Orissa High Court on 8 October 2021.

In September 2022, Supreme court collegium led by CJI Uday Umesh Lalit recommended him to be appointed as chief justice of Orissa High Court but government did not clear this recommendation and subsequently collegium withdrew this recommendation in January 2023. In February 2023 fresh recommendation was made to appoint him as chief justice of Tripura High Court and he was finally appointed as Chief Justice of Tripura High Court on 15 February 2023 and retired on 22 February 2023 after serving brief tenure of merely 8 days.
