= Subhasis Talapatra =

33rd Chief Justice of Orissa High Court

Hon'ble Chief Justice (Retd.) Subhasis Talapatra
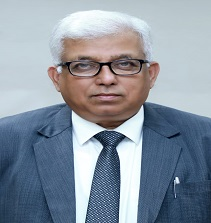

33rd Chief Justice of Orissa High Court
- In office 8 August 2023 – 3 October 2023
- Nominated by: D. Y. Chandrachud
- Appointed by: Droupadi Murmu
- Preceded by: S. Muralidhar
- Succeeded by: C. S. Singh; B. R. Sarangi (acting)

Judge of Orissa High Court
- In office 10 June 2022 – 7 August 2023
- Nominated by: N. V. Ramana
- Appointed by: Ram Nath Kovind

Judge of Tripura High Court
- In office 13 September 2013 – 9 June 2022
- Nominated by: P. Sathasivam
- Appointed by: Pranab Mukherjee
- Acting Chief Justice
- In office 11 November 2019 – 15 November 2019
- Appointed by: Ram Nath Kovind
- Preceded by: Sanjay Karol
- Succeeded by: Akil Kureshi
- In office 2 November 2018 – 13 November 2018
- Appointed by: Ram Nath Kovind
- Preceded by: Ajay Rastogi
- Succeeded by: Sanjay Karol

Judge of Gauhati High Court
- In office 15 November 2011 – 12 September 2013
- Nominated by: S. H. Kapadia
- Appointed by: Pratibha Patil

Personal details
- Born: 4 October 1961 (age 65) Udaipur, Tripura
- Education: University of Calcutta

Subhasis Talapatra (born 4 October 1961) is a retired Indian judge. He is a former Chief Justice of Orissa High Court. He has also served as judge of Orissa High Court and Tripura High Court and as Acting Chief Justice of Tripura High Court. In September 2020 Justice Talapatra, was selected as a member of the Telangana Krishna Water Disputes Tribunal.

== Career ==
Talapatra was born in 1961 at Udaipur in Tripura. He passed LL.B. from Department of Law, University of Calcutta and enrolled with Bar Council of Assam, Nagaland, Meghalaya, Manipur, Tripura, Mizoram and Arunachal Pradesh on 12 September 1990. He started practice in the High Courts of North East India since 1990. Talapatra worked on Civil, Criminal and Constitutional issues in Agartala Bench of Gauhati High Court. He became the Senior Advocate on 21 December 2004.

He was elevated as an Additional Judge of Gauhati High Court on 15 November 2011. On 13 September 2013 he was appointed as the permanent Judge of Tripura High Court. Talapatra has also served as Acting Chief Justice of Tripura High Court twice. He was transferred as Judge of Orissa High Court on 10 June 2022. He was elevated as Chief Justice of Orissa High Court on 8 August 2023. He retired on 3 October 2023.
