= Aparesh Kumar Singh =

Judge of Supreme Court of India

Hon’ble Justice Aparesh Kumar Singh
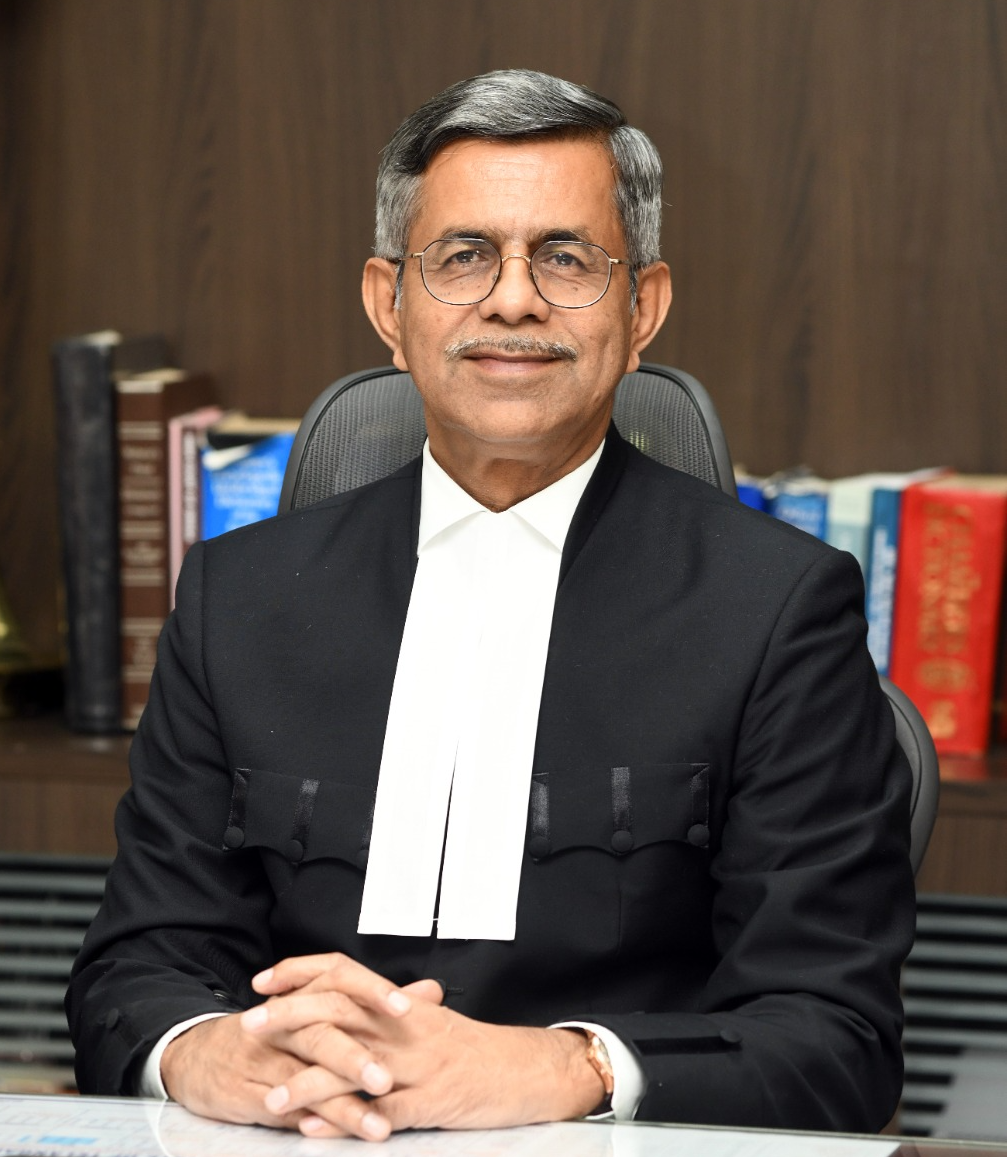

Judge of Supreme Court of India
- Incumbent
- Assumed office 6 October 2026
- Nominated by: Surya Kant
- Appointed by: Droupadi Murmu

7th Chief Justice of Telangana High Court
- In office 19 July 2025 – 5 October 2026
- Nominated by: B. R. Gavai
- Appointed by: Droupadi Murmu
- Preceded by: Alok Aradhe; Sujoy Paul (acting); P. Sam Koshy (acting)
- Succeeded by: T. Chakraborty; P. Sam Koshy (acting)

8th Chief Justice of Tripura High Court
- In office 17 April 2023 – 18 July 2025
- Nominated by: D. Y. Chandrachud
- Appointed by: Droupadi Murmu
- Preceded by: Jaswant Singh; T. A. Goud (acting)
- Succeeded by: M. S. R. Rao; T. A. Goud (acting)

Judge of Jharkhand High Court
- In office 24 January 2012 – 16 April 2023
- Nominated by: S. H. Kapadia
- Appointed by: Pratibha Patil
- Acting Chief Justice
- In office 20 December 2022 – 19 February 2023
- Appointed by: Droupadi Murmu
- Preceded by: Ravi Ranjan
- Succeeded by: S. K. Mishra

Personal details
- Born: 7 July 1965 (age 61)
- Relations: B. P. Sinha (maternal great grandfather); S. K. Singh and B. P. Singh (maternal uncle)
- Education: B. A. (Hons.), L.L.B
- Alma mater: University of Delhi

Aparesh Kumar Singh (born 7 July 1965) is an Indian judge who is currently serving as Judge of the Supreme Court of India. He has served as Chief Justice of Telangana High Court and Tripura High Court. He was former judge of the Jharkhand High Court where he also served as Acting Chief Justice.

== Early life and family background ==
Singh was born on 7 July 1965 and hails from Chandchora village in the Karon block of Deoghar district, Jharkhand. He completed his schooling in Deoghar, studying at St. Francis School up to Class V, R.K. Mission Vidyapith from Classes VI to X and Deoghar College for Classes XI and XII. He studied at the University of Delhi, where he completed his B.A. (Honours) and LL.B., and enrolled as an advocate in 1990.

His background was closely connected with the legal profession. His maternal great-grandfather was Justice Bhuvaneshwar Prasad Sinha, who served as the sixth Chief Justice of India from 1959 to 1964. His maternal grandfather, Justice Shambhu Prasad Singh, was a former Acting Chief Justice of the Patna High Court. Singh's mother was the maternal grand daughter of former CJI Sinha and sister of former supreme court judge Shiva Kirti Singh and cousin of B. P. Singh also a Supreme court judge. The Supreme Court's own profile of Justice Shiva Kirti Singh records B.P. Sinha as his maternal grandfather and Shambhu Prasad Singh as his father, while contemporary judicial profiles identify the same family relationships in relation to Aparesh Kumar Singh. Thus, Singh entered the profession with an unusually strong family association with the judiciary, although his own professional career developed through practice at the Bar and subsequently through the High Courts.

His practice before the Patna and Jharkhand High Courts covered constitutional, civil, criminal, service, arbitration and labour matters. He also appeared before the Central Administrative Tribunal and represented institutions including the Chancellor of Jharkhand State Universities and the Mineral Area Development Authority, Dhanbad. He appeared for the Mineral Area Development Authority in Mineral Area Development Authority v. Steel Authority of India Ltd., (2011) 4 SCC 450, a case concerning the legal character of royalty and the constitutional questions surrounding the earlier decisions in India Cement and Kesoram Industries. His work also included public-interest litigation concerning the eradication of leprosy in Jharkhand, and he was appointed amicus curiae in a number of matters by the Jharkhand High Court. He was associated with the Jharkhand State Legal Services Authority from the early years of the State's High Court and was involved in legal-awareness programmes and Lok Adalats. In 2006, he prepared a status report on the subordinate judiciary in Jharkhand which was subsequently published by the Judicial Academy, Jharkhand.

== Career ==
Singh was appointed an Additional Judge of the Jharkhand High Court on 24 January 2012 and became a permanent judge on 16 January 2014. His judicial work in Jharkhand included a substantial number of service, taxation, employment and public-law cases. In Jitram Manjhi v. Bharat Coking Coal Ltd., for example, a bench of which he was the single judge held that a person could not claim a right under a scheme which had itself been declared unconstitutional. In Vijay Kumar Paswan v. State of Jharkhand, he dealt with the question of appointments made on the basis of hereditary succession to the post of chowkidar and applied the Supreme Court's ruling in Surendra Paswan v. State of Bihar. In Shroff Enterprises v. State of Jharkhand, a Division Bench comprising Singh and Justice Anubha Rawat Choudhary considered the meaning of "bulk supply" under the applicable electricity notifications and held that, after the relevant amendment, the expression was confined to supplies to industrial and mining consumers. These cases illustrate the range of his work on service law, public employment and regulatory questions rather than a single specialised area of jurisprudence.

From April 2021, Singh served as Executive Chairman of the Jharkhand State Legal Services Authority. He subsequently became Acting Chief Justice of the Jharkhand High Court on 20 December 2022 and remained in that position until 19 February 2023. His period as Acting Chief Justice came after more than a decade as a judge of the court and immediately preceded his movement into the Chief Justiceship of another High Court which was initiated by supreme court collegium recommendation in February 2023.

== Chief justiceship ==
=== At Tripura ===
Singh took oath as the 8th Chief Justice of the Tripura High Court on 17 April 2023. His tenure there included both judicial work and the administrative responsibilities associated with heading a relatively small High Court. One of the matters decided by a bench headed by him was Sri Sujoy Paul v. Sri Niranjan Paul, decided on 11 December 2024. The case concerned the respective jurisdiction of the Family Court and District Court under the Family Courts Act, 1984 and the Guardians and Wards Act, 1890. The court held that the Family Court had exclusive jurisdiction over custody and guardianship of the person of a minor, but that the later legislation had not transferred jurisdiction over guardianship of the minor's property. The Tripura High Court itself included the decision in its 2024–25 collection of reportable judgments.

=== Transfer to Telangana ===
The Supreme Court Collegium recommended on 26 May 2025 that Singh be transferred from the Tripura High Court to the Telangana High Court as Chief Justice. The transfer formed part of a wider set of changes involving Chief Justices of several High Courts. He took oath as Chief Justice of the Telangana High Court on 19 July 2025. The Telangana State Legal Services Authority subsequently recorded him as its Patron-in-Chief.

Justice Singh in Supreme Court of India

His Telangana tenure has so far combined judicial work with the administration of the High Court and the State Legal Services Authority. His benches have dealt with constitutional, service, taxation, commercial and criminal matters. His Telangana tenure has therefore been relatively short in comparison with his long association with Jharkhand, but it has added another Chief Justiceship to his career immediately before the consideration of his name for the Supreme Court.

On 28 September 2026, the Supreme Court Collegium recommended Justice Aparesh Kumar Singh, along with Gujarat Chief Justice Sunita Agarwal and Delhi Chief Justice Devendra Kumar Upadhyaya, for appointment as judges of the Supreme Court. Singh's career at the time of the recommendation therefore comprised more than three decades at the Bar and Bench, a judgeship of the Jharkhand High Court, a period as its Acting Chief Justice, and Chief Justiceships of Tripura and Telangana.

This recommendation came after his initial suppression by Justice Shree Chandrashekhar, who was junior to Singh in Jharkhand High Court but elevated to Supreme Court before him in June 2026.

He was appointed on 5 October 2026 and took oath as judge of the Supreme Court of India on 6 October 2026.
