= Hamarsan Singh Thangkhiew =

Judge of Meghalaya High Court

Hon'ble Justice Hamarsan Singh Thangkhiew

Judge of Meghalaya High Court
- Incumbent
- Assumed office 19 November 2018
- Nominated by: Ranjan Gogoi
- Appointed by: Ram Nath Kovind
- Acting Chief Justice
- In office 6 September 2025 – 7 October 2025
- Appointed by: Droupadi Murmu
- Preceded by: I. P. Mukerji
- Succeeded by: Soumen Sen
- In office 17 August 2024 – 2 October 2024
- Appointed by: Droupadi Murmu
- Preceded by: S. Vaidyanathan
- Succeeded by: I. P. Mukerji
- In office 2 November 2023 – 10 February 2024
- Appointed by: Droupadi Murmu
- Preceded by: Sanjib Banerjee
- Succeeded by: S. Vaidyanathan
- In office 4 November 2021 – 23 November 2021
- Appointed by: Ram Nath Kovind
- Preceded by: Ranjit Vasantrao More
- Succeeded by: Sanjib Banerjee
- In office 3 November 2019 – 12 November 2019
- Appointed by: Ram Nath Kovind
- Preceded by: Ajay Kumar Mittal
- Succeeded by: Mohammad Rafiq

Personal details
- Born: 24 December 1966 (age 59) Shillong, Meghalaya India
- Education: LL. B.
- Alma mater: St. Edmund's College, Shillong; Delhi University

Hamarsan Singh Thangkhiew (born 24 December 1966) is an Indian judge. Presently, he is judge of Meghalaya High Court. He has also served as Acting Chief Justice of Meghalaya High Court.

== Early life and career ==
Justice Thangkhiew was born on 24 December 1966 at Shillong, Meghalaya. He completed his initial schooling and college from St. Edmund’s College, Shillong. He did his LLB from Delhi University in 1990. He was enrolled as an Advocate with the Bar Council of Assam, Nagaland, Meghalaya, Manipur, Tripura, Mizoram and Arunachal Pradesh in 1990-1991.

He practiced in areas such as civil, constitutional, customary and company law. He had also undertaken pro bono work for indigent persons apart from mediation activities under the auspices of Meghalaya State Legal Services Authority. He was designated Senior Advocate by the Gauhati High Court in August 2010. He was an elected member of the Bar Council of Assam, Nagaland, Meghalaya, Manipur, Tripura, Mizoram, Arunachal Pradesh and Sikkim and also a member of the Meghalaya State Bar Council under Section 58 of Advocates Act, 1961. He was also member of Meghalaya State Law Commission.

He was appointed as Judge of the High Court of Meghalaya on 17 November 2018 and took oath as same on 19 November 2018. He was appointed subsequent to the recommendations of the Chief Justice of Meghalaya to the Supreme Court collegium on 26 February 2018. He was the first tribal Khasi Advocate to be sworn in as a Judge of the Meghalaya High Court, thus making history.

He has since then served as Acting Chief Justice of Meghalaya High Court on five different occasions.
