= St. Edward's School, Shimla =

Convent school in India

St. Edward's School
- Latin: Schola S. Eduardi
- School crest

Location
- Milsington Estate, Cart Road; Shimla, Himachal Pradesh 171001; India; 31.095321°N 77.172021°E

Information
- Type: Convent school
- Motto: Latin: Lumen Sequere ("Follow the Light")
- Religious affiliation: Roman Catholic
- Patron saint: St. Edward
- Established: 9 March 1925; 101 years ago
- Founders: Irish Christian Brothers
- School district: Shimla
- Oversight: Simla Chandigarh Diocese
- President: Ignatius Loyola Mascarenhas
- Principal: Fr. Anil Wilson Sequeira
- Staff: 75
- Grades: Nursery - Class XII
- Gender: Boys
- Enrollment: Approx. 2000
- Language: English
- Campus size: 15,909 m^{2} (171,240 sq ft)
- Campus type: Urban
- Houses: St. Luke's House; St. Mathew's House; St. John's House; St. Mark's House
- Colours: Navy blue, green & yellow
- Rival: Bishop Cotton School
- Accreditation: AISSCE; AISSE
- Yearbook: The Edwardian Voices
- Tuition: ₹52,660 - ₹58,200
- Affiliation: CBSE 2008 onwards CISCE until 2008
- Alumni: Old Edwardians
- Website: stedwardsshimla.org

St. Edward's School is a convent school at Milsington Estate, Shimla, Himachal Pradesh, India. It is a boys'-only day school. St. Edward's has been ranked among the top schools in India. It was initially affiliated to CISCE but was changed over to the Central Board of Secondary Education (CBSE) system in 2008. Today the School is managed by Simla Chandigarh Educational Society, under the Bishop of Simla Chandigarh Diocese. The school offers education from Nursery to Class XII.

== House Club System ==
House name and Colours
House	Motto	Colour	Swatch
St. John's	Sure and Steadfast	Yellow	
St. Matthew's	To Dare is to Do	Blue	
St. Mark's	Learn Leap Lead	Red	
St. Luke's	Deeds not Words	Green	

All students are placed in one of the four houses named after the Four Evangelists: St. Mark's House, St. Luke's House, St. Matthew's House and St. John's House. Each house is led by a captain and a vice-captain, who are responsible for organizing and conducting various co-curricular activities in the school. They are usually chosen on the basis of their academic performance in addition to their participation in sports and cultural activities. Apart from the house captains, there are also a school captain and a vice-captain. Other members of the school cabinet includes school reporter, sports captain and vice-captain, activity captain and vice-captain and school editors.

Various clubs form a central part of holistic learning in the school, namely the cultural club, science and maths club, literary club, sports club, eco club and yoga.

== Controversy ==
The school landed itself in a controversy in 2012 by not allowing a Sikh student to wear a turban in school. The issue was settled after the intervention of the government.

== Notable alumni ==
- Mohammad Hamid Ansari, former Vice President, India
- Bipin Rawat, former Chief of Defence Staff, Indian Armed Forces & former Chief of Army Staff, Indian Army
- Ajay Banga, President, World Bank & ex-CEO, Mastercard
- Virbhadra Singh, former Chief Minister, Himachal Pradesh
- Kanwar Pal Singh Gill, ex-DGP, Punjab Police
- Deepak Gupta, former Judge, Supreme Court of India
- Sanjay Karol, Judge, Supreme Court of India
- Sudhir Kakar, psychoanalyst and author
- Ashok Sukumaran, media artist
- Anil Wilson, former Vice-Chancellor, Himachal Pradesh University
- Vijay Kumar Berry, Maha Vir Chakra recipient
- Raj Mohan Vohra, Maha Vir Chakra recipient & Commander of the Eastern Command, Indian Army
- Antony Jameson, Professor of Engineering in the Department of Aeronautics & Astronautics, Stanford University
- Pratap Bhanu Mehta, former Vice Chancellor, Ashoka University & former President, Centre for Policy Research
- Ashok Chopra, journalist and author
- Anirudh Singh, Cabinet Minister, Government of Himachal Pradesh
- Harsh Mahajan, Member of Parliament, Rajya Sabha
- Sanjay Chauhan, ex-Mayor, Shimla Municipal Corporation

== See also ==
- Bishop Cotton School, Shimla (1859)
- Auckland House School, Shimla (1868)
- Convent of Jesus and Mary, Chelsea, Shimla (1864)
- Loreto Convent, Tara Hall, Shimla (1892)
- St. Bede's College, Shimla (1904)
