= Ranjit Vasantrao More =

10th Chief Justice of Meghalaya High Court

Hon'ble Chief Justice (Retd.) Ranjit Vasantrao More

Chairman, Central Administrative Tribunal
- Incumbent
- Assumed office 30 July 2022
- Appointed by: Droupadi Murmu
- Preceded by: L. Narasimha Reddy

10th Chief Justice of Meghalaya High Court
- In office 12 October 2021 – 3 November 2021
- Nominated by: N. V. Ramana
- Appointed by: Ram Nath Kovind
- Preceded by: Biswanath Somadder
- Succeeded by: Sanjib Banerjee; H. S. Thangkhiew (acting)

Judge of Meghalaya High Court
- In office 9 March 2020 – 11 October 2021
- Nominated by: S. A. Bobde
- Appointed by: Ram Nath Kovind

Judge of Bombay High Court
- In office 8 September 2006 – 8 March 2020
- Nominated by: Y. K. Sabharwal
- Appointed by: A. P. J. Abdul Kalam

Personal details
- Born: 4 November 1959 (age 66) Satara district, Maharashtra
- Education: B.A. (Hons.), LL.B and LL.M
- Alma mater: Shivaji University, Mumbai University

Ranjit Vasantrao More (born 4 November 1959) is a retired Indian Judge who is currently serving as the Chairman of Central Administrative Tribunal since 30 July 2022. He is former Chief Justice of Meghalaya High Court. He is also former Judge of Meghalaya High Court and Bombay High Court.

== Early life and education ==
More was born on 4 November 1959 in Satara district. He completed his schooling in Satara, and B.A. (Hons.) from Kolhapur. He completed his LL.B from Shivaji University, Kolhapur where he was second in order of merit. He did his LL.M. from Mumbai University.

== Career ==
He was enrolled as advocate on 15 September 1983 and joined chambers of Ajit Prakash Shah, who later went on to serve as judge in Bombay High Court as well as chief justice in Madras and Delhi High Courts. As an advocate, his practice was rooted deeply in the Bombay High Court's appellate side. He became a trusted counsel for vital public institutions, successfully arguing constitutional, civil, and criminal matters on behalf of local municipal administrations, district central cooperative banks, agricultural sugar factories, and premier state bodies like the Election Commission and the Maharashtra Public Service Commission. His extensive courtroom experience also included arguing pivotal public interest litigations and high-stakes legal battles.

On 8 September 2006 he was appointed as judge of Bombay High Court and served as such till his transfer as judge of Meghalaya High Court on 9 March 2020. On 12 October 2021 he was elevated as Chief Justice of Meghalaya High Court and served for less than month before retiring on 3 November 2021.

== Post retirement ==
After his retirement as Meghalaya High Court's chief justice he was appointed as chairman of Central Administrative Tribunal on 30 July 2022. His tenure was scheduled to end on 30 July 2026 but in May 2026, Supreme Court of India extended tenure of all serving chairmen and members of all the tribunals till 8 September 2026.
