= Prakash Shrivastava =

Former Chief Justice of Calcutta High Court

Hon'ble Chief Justice (Retd.) Prakash Shrivastava

Chief Justice of Calcutta High Court
- In office 11 October 2021 – 30 March 2023
- Nominated by: N. V. Ramana
- Appointed by: Ram Nath Kovind
- Preceded by: Rajesh Bindal (acting)
- Succeeded by: T. S. Sivagnanam (acting)

Chairperson of National Green Tribunal
- Incumbent
- Assumed office 23 August 2023
- Appointed by: Appointments Committee of the Cabinet
- Preceded by: Sheo Kumar Singh (acting)

Judge of Madhya Pradesh High Court
- In office 18 January 2008 – 10 October 2021
- Nominated by: K. G. Balakrishnan
- Appointed by: Pratibha Patil

Personal details
- Born: 31 March 1961 (age 65)

Prakash Shrivastava (born 31 March 1961) is a retired Indian judge, who served as the Chief Justice of Calcutta High Court from October 2021 to March 2023. He is currently serving as Chairperson of National Green Tribunal since 21-08-2023.

== Career ==
He was born on 31 March 1961. He was enrolled as an Advocate on 2 February 1987. He has practised in Civil, Tax and Constitutional sides in Supreme Court of India. He was elevated as an Additional Judge of Madhya Pradesh High Court on 18 January 2008 and took oath as Permanent Judge on 15 January 2010. He was elevated as Chief Justice of Calcutta High Court on 9 October 2021 and took oath on 11 October 2021.
