= Vijay Kumar Berry =

Indian Army Officer

Brigadier Vijay Kumar Berry MVC
- Born: June 26, 1938 (age 88); Amritsar, British Punjab
- Military career
- Allegiance: India
- Branch: Indian Army
- Rank: Brigadier
- Service number: IC-11567
- Unit: 4 PARA
- Conflicts: Indo-Pakistani War of 1971
- Awards: Maha Vir Chakra

Brigadier Vijay Kumar Berry, MVC is a retired officer of the Indian Army who served with the Parachute Regiment, and was awarded the Maha Vir Chakra, India's second highest award for gallantry in the face of the enemy. The award was made for his actions immediately after the Indo-Pakistani War of 1971, for his conspicuous gallantry and outstanding leadership while leading a company of the 4th Battalion, Parachute Regiment in an assault on a Pakistani defensive position that remained inside Indian territory. He retired from the army as a brigadier and lives in New Delhi.

== Early life and family ==
Vijay Kumar Berry was born on 26 June 1938 in Amritsar, in the British province of Punjab, the son of Shri Om Prakash Berry. He attended Sherwood College in Nainital, Uttarakhand, and St. Edward's School, Shimla before entering the National Defence Academy from which he went on to attend the Indian Military Academy. His wife's name is Klran, and they have two daughters: Manika, born in 1969; and Rashmi, born in 1972.

== Military career ==
Berry was commissioned into the Parachute Regiment of the Indian Army on 7 June 1959. At the time of the Indo-Pakistani War of 1971, Berry was a major commanding C Company of the 4th Battalion, Parachute Regiment (4 PARA). The battalion had been deployed into the Ganganagar district of Rajasthan to secure the area from Pakistani incursions. On 26 December a Pakistani encroachment was located 550 m (600 yd) inside the Indian border at an area known as the "Sand Dunes". Pakistani troops had developed a defensive position including artillery emplacements, and had protected it with minefields. Other strong Pakistani positions across the border dominated this position. On 28 December, Berry's C Company was given the mission of clearing the Pakistani position.

The assault commenced at 03:00, and was quickly pinned down by medium machine gun fire. Berry then led his men forward with great determination and without any regard for his personal safety, although the company suffered casualties and one platoon became separated from the rest of the company due to dust created by artillery fire. Berry then led his company through the minefield surrounding the Pakistani position, which caused further casualties. A threat from nearby tanks emerged, but by 05:30 C Company had captured about half of the Pakistani position. Another medium machine gun held up the assault, but was silenced single-handedly by Lance Havildar Tek Bahadur who was killed in the effort. C Company then captured the remainder of the objective. After losing the position, the Pakistanis subjected the position to heavy artillery and mortar fire for over twelve hours. Undeterred, Berry moved among his company, motivating and inspiring his troops, who held onto the captured position.

For his actions during this operation, Berry was commended by the Indian government for conspicuous gallantry and outstanding leadership, for which he was awarded the Maha Vir Chakra, the second-highest award for gallantry available to members of the Indian Armed Forces. The award was promulgated on Independence Day in 1972. 4 PARA was awarded the battle honour "Sadiqia Sand Dune 1971" for their actions in capturing the position, known as the Battle of Nagi.

== Later life ==
Berry retired from the army as a brigadier, and now lives in New Delhi.
