= Federal Ministry of Justice =

Federal Ministry of Justice may refer to:

- Ministry of Justice (Austria)
- Federal Ministry of Justice (Germany)
- Federal Ministry of Justice (Nigeria)

== See also ==
- Ministry of Justice
- Ministry of Law (disambiguation)
