= Deepak Gupta (judge) =

Former judge of Supreme Court of India (2017-2020)

Hon'ble Justice (Retd.) Deepak Gupta
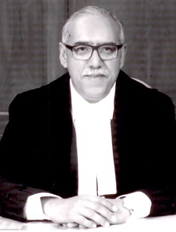

Judge of the Supreme Court of India
- In office 15 February 2017 – 6 May 2020
- Nominated by: J. S. Khehar
- Appointed by: Pranab Mukherjee

10th Chief Justice of Chhattisgarh High Court
- In office 16 May 2016 – 14 February 2017
- Nominated by: T. S. Thakur
- Appointed by: Pranab Mukherjee
- Preceded by: Navin Sinha
- Succeeded by: T. B. Radhakrishnan; Pritinker Diwaker (acting)

1st Chief Justice of Tripura High Court
- In office 23 March 2013 – 15 May 2016
- Nominated by: Altamas Kabir
- Appointed by: Pranab Mukherjee
- Preceded by: Position established
- Succeeded by: T. Vaiphei

Judge of Himachal Pradesh High Court
- In office 4 October 2004 – 22 March 2013
- Nominated by: R. C. Lahoti
- Appointed by: A. P. J. Abdul Kalam

Personal details
- Born: 7 May 1955 (age 71) Nurpur, Himachal Pradesh
- Education: Faculty of Law, University of Delhi (LL.B)

Deepak Gupta (born 7 May 1955) is a former judge of the Supreme Court of India and former chief justice of the Tripura High Court and Chhattisgarh High Court. He has also served as a judge of the Himachal Pradesh High Court, serving as the head of its green bench.

== Early life ==
Gupta was born into a family of lawyers hailing from Shimla, Himachal Pradesh. He did his schooling from St. Edward's School, Shimla. He started practicing in the Himachal Pradesh High Court in 1978 after completing a Bachelor of Laws. from the Faculty of Law, University of Delhi.

== Career ==
He served as an advocate at the Himachal Pradesh High Court and was also the president of the Himachal Pradesh High Court Bar Association between 2002 and 2003. He took oath as a judge at the Himachal Pradesh High Court on 4 October 2004. Gupta served as the head of the court's green bench and twice as the acting chief justice of the Himachal High Court in 2007. He was also the president of the Himachal Pradesh Judicial Academy and the executive chairman of the Himachal Pradesh State Legal Services Authority.

He took oath as the first chief justice of the newly formed Tripura High Court on 23 March 2013, in the process becoming the first judge from Himachal Pradesh to be directly appointed the chief justice of another state. He was transferred to the Chhattisgarh High Court and was sworn in as the chief justice on 16 May 2016.

He was elevated as a judge of the Supreme Court of India and sworn in on 17 February 2017. On 5 June 2017, he heard and disposed of 33 cases on a single day; he held the court alone as his colleague Mohan Shantanagoudar, who was to head the bench reported unwell. He retired on 6 May 2020.
