= Revati Mohite Dere =

15th Chief Justice of Meghalaya High Court

Hon'ble Chief Justice Revati Mohite Dere
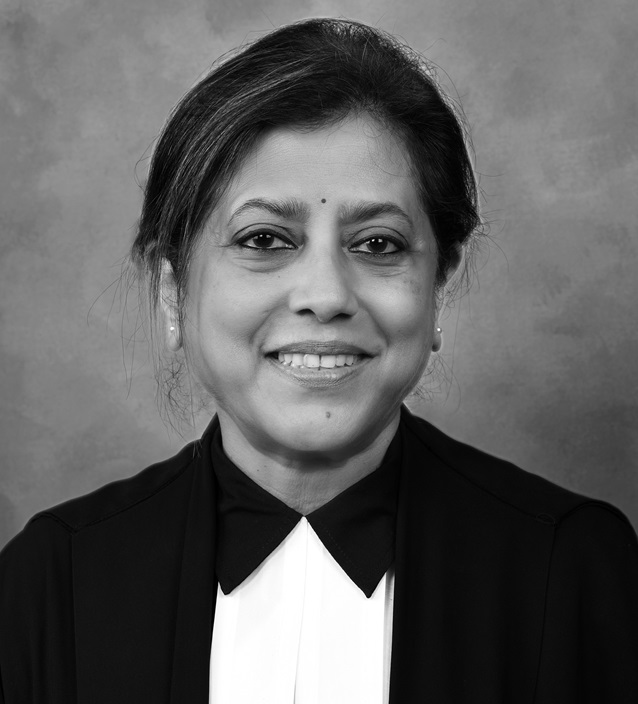
- Official portrait

15th Chief Justice of Meghalaya High Court
- Incumbent
- Assumed office 10 January 2026
- Nominated by: Surya Kant
- Appointed by: Droupadi Murmu
- Preceded by: Soumen Sen

Judge of Bombay High Court
- In office 21 June 2013 – 9 January 2026
- Nominated by: Altamas Kabir
- Appointed by: Pranab Mukherjee

Personal details
- Born: 17 April 1965 (age 61) Pune, Maharashtra
- Parent: Vijayrao A. Mohite
- Education: Symbiosis Law College, Fergusson College, Cambridge University,

Revati Mohite Dere is the Chief Justice of the Meghalaya High Court, India. She has written a number of significant judgments in relation to criminal procedure and police investigations in India, including cases concerning press freedom to report on criminal trials, death penalty sentences for repeated offences and police accountability for false and improper investigations.

== Life ==
Justice Dere was born and educated in Pune, Maharashtra, and studied law at the Symbiosis Law College. She obtained an LL.M. from Cambridge University, on a Commonwealth Trust Scholarship.

== Career ==
Dere practiced law at the Bombay High Court and also served as a prosecutor for the Government of Maharashtra. She was appointed an additional judge of the Bombay High Court on 21 June 2013 and made a permanent judge on 2 March 2016. She is currently still serving on the Bombay High Court.

On 18 December 2025, Supreme court collegium headed by CJI Surya Kant recommended her to be appointed as chief justice of Meghalaya High Court. Central government cleared her elevation as Chief Justice on 1 January 2026 and she took oath as second women chief justice of Meghalaya High Court on 10 January 2026.

== Notable judgments ==
Dere has been a part of several benches, and has also independently passed several orders relating to police accountability and corruption, as well as concerning women's rights, and public welfare.

In 2015, Dere and another judge, V.M. Kanade ordered the Government of Maharashtra to take strict action against custodial deaths, and to investigate and suspend policemen responsible for any such deaths.

In 2016, she was part of a bench holding that the prohibition on allowing women to enter the inner sanctum of the Haji Ali Dargah (a mosque in Bombay) was unconstitutional, and directed the managing trust of the mosque to allow women to enter and worship.

Dere and V.M. Kanade also recommended in a separate case in 2016, that corporations should utilize their mandatory corporate social responsibility allocations to helping pay hospital bills for impoverished persons.

In 2017, Dere and another judge, Mridula Bhatkar, led a judicial investigation into the conditions of children who were held in detainment with their mothers, in prisons in Maharashtra.

In 2018, Dere lifted a previously imposed gag order on press reporting in the case concerning the death of Sohrabuddin Sheikh and Tulsiram Prajapati reiterating the importance of a free press. Dere also questioned the Central Bureau of Investigation regarding their work on the case, and particularly on the discharge of police officers, including D.G. Vanzara, in the case. Dere was subsequently reassigned, despite having been assigned to the case just two weeks prior to her reassignment. Following her reassignment, Dere went on leave. The reassignment led lawyers' associations in Mumbai to approach the Chief Justice of the Bombay High Court, Vijaya Tahilramani. Citing the political connections to the case, including the discharge of BJP leader Amit Shah (now India's Home Minister), the association's letter to the Chief Justice argued that her transfer undermined "...the faith of the people in the institution of Judiciary as such." The transfer was also considered by the Supreme Court of India in a case concerning the death of another judge associated with the case, Brijgopal Harkishan Loya. A bench of the Chief Justice Dipak Misra, Justice D.Y. Chandrachud, and A.M. Khanwilkar rejected the concerns raised, describing the transfer of Dere as a "routine affair".

In 2019, Dere and another judge, B.P. Dharmadhikari, dismissed a challenge to provisions in the Indian Penal Code 1908 which allowed the imposition of the death penalty for repeated convictions for rape, in the case of the Shakti Mills gang rape. Dere and Dharmadhikari also rejected an attempt by the Government of Maharashtra to secure the early release of 11 policemen who had been convicted and sentenced to life imprisonment for the extrajudicial killing of noted gangster, Ramnarayan Gupta.

In 2019, Dere and another judge allowed a 14-year-old child to abort a fetus conceived as a consequence of rape, making an exception to the prohibition of termination of pregnancies beyond 20 weeks of conception under the Medical Termination of Pregnancy Act.

In August 2019, Dere directed the Navi Mumbai Police Commissioner to take action against officers who had framed and falsely accused a person in a case concerning prostitution. The man had been detained since 2017 without any evidence of an offence being committed. Dere granted bail, describing the case as "disturbing". In May 2020, Dere ruled that the police had acted unlawfully in detaining K. Narayanan, a trade union leader who was providing aid to displaced migrant workers during the COVID-19 pandemic in India. The Bombay Police had detained Narayanan in a quarantine center, claiming that he was suspected of having COVID-19, but had withheld his test results from him. Dere held that quarantine centers could not be used by the Bombay Police for "preventive detention or punitive measures."
