= Sujoy Paul =

44th Chief Justice of Calcutta High Court

Hon'ble Chief Justice Sujoy Paul
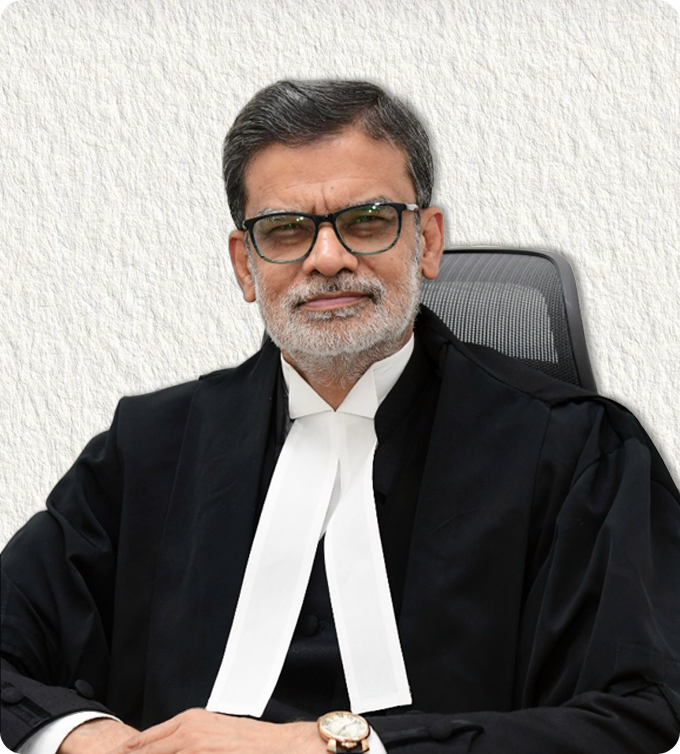

44th Chief Justice of Calcutta High Court
- In office 16 January 2026 – 20 June 2026
- Nominated by: Surya Kant
- Appointed by: Droupadi Murmu
- Preceded by: T. S. Sivagnanam; Soumen Sen (acting)
- Succeeded by: R. V. Ghuge; T. Chakraborty (acting)

Judge of Calcutta High Court
- In office 18 July 2025 – 15 January 2026; Acting CJ: 8 October 2025 – 15 January 2026
- Nominated by: B. R. Gavai
- Appointed by: Droupadi Murmu

Judge of Telangana High Court
- In office 26 March 2024 – 17 July 2025
- Nominated by: D. Y. Chandrachud
- Appointed by: Droupadi Murmu
- Acting Chief Justice
- In office 21 January 2025 – 17 July 2025
- Appointed by: Droupadi Murmu
- Preceded by: Alok Aradhe
- Succeeded by: A. K. Singh; P. Sam Koshy (acting)

Judge of Madhya Pradesh High Court
- In office 27 May 2011 – 25 March 2024
- Nominated by: S. H. Kapadia
- Appointed by: Pratibha Patil

Personal details
- Born: 21 June 1964 (age 62)
- Education: L.L.B
- Alma mater: Rani Durgavati University

Sujoy Paul (born 21 June 1964) is a retired Indian judge, who served as 44th Chief Justice of Calcutta High Court in 2026. He is former judge of High courts of Calcutta, Telangana and Madhya Pradesh. He also served as acting Chief Justice of Calcutta and Telangana High Courts.

== Early life ==
Justice Paul was born on 21 June 1964 to Late Noni Gopal Paul and Manjushri Paul. He completed his school education in Pandit L.S. Jha Model Higher Secondary School and did his Graduation, Post Graduation and LL.B from Rani Durgavati University at Jabalpur in Madhya Pradesh.

He enrolled as Advocate with the Bar Council of Madhya Pradesh in 1990 and actively practiced in civil, constitutional, industrial and service and other branches of Law and appeared before various courts.

== Career ==
He was elevated as Additional Judge of Madhya Pradesh High Court at Jabalpur on 27 May 2011 and was confirmed as permanent Judge on 14 April 2014.

He was transferred to Telangana High Court on his request to get transferred from Madhya Pradesh High Court as his son was practising in the Madhya Pradesh High Court. He took oath as Judge of Telangana High Court on 26 March 2024. He was appointed as Acting Chief Justice of Telangana High Court on 21 January 2025 consequent upon the transfer of the then chief justice Alok Aradhe to Bombay High Court.

He was transferred to Calcutta High Court on 18 July 2025 and became its acting chief justice on 8 October 2025.

=== As Calcutta Chief justice ===
On 9 January 2026, Supreme court collegium led by CJI Surya Kant recommended him to be appointed as chief justice of Calcutta High Court. Government cleared his appointment on 14 January 2026 and he took oath as chief justice on 16 January 2026.

His tenure as chief justice of Calcutta High court coincided with Special Intensive Revision of electoral rolls in West Bengal. Due to alleged mistrust between Election Commission of India and Government of West Bengal, Supreme court has directed deployment of judicial officers to complete the process of SIR in the state; for this purpose role of Justice Paul as Chief justice of Calcutta became instrumental in completing the ongoing rolls revision. He cancelled the leaves of all judicial officers in the state as well as also requested services of judicial officers from neighbouring states such as Odisha and Jharkhand for this purpose. He also constituted appellate tribunal comprising former Calcutta HC chief justice T. S. Sivagnanam for hearing appeals related to names deletion from electoral rolls.

In March 2026, 7 judicial officers (including 2 women) engaged in SIR work were gheraoed at BDO office at Malda, West Bengal and made hostages by angry mob, it was reported that during this incident Chief justice Paul repeatedly tried to contact West Bengal's chief secretary but his calls went unanswered and situation was reportedly brought under control after midnight intervention of Chief Justice of India Surya Kant. Supreme court rapped Bengal's chief secretary by reportedly asking him to lower his security a little bit so that minions like Calcutta HC chief justice can speak to him.

He retired as Calcutta High Court chief justice on 20 June 2026 after serving brief tenure of six months.
