= Uma Nath Singh =

Indian Judge (born 1954)

Hon'ble Justice (Retd.) Uma Nath Singh

Lokayukta of Nagaland
- In office 13 March 2019 – 1 February 2021
- Appointed by: Padmanabha Acharya
- Preceded by: Position established
- Succeeded by: Mayang Lima (acting)

3rd Chief Justice of Meghalaya High Court
- In office 19 March 2015 – 14 January 2016; Acting CJ : 27 August 2014 - 18 March 2015
- Nominated by: H. L. Dattu
- Appointed by: Pranab Mukherjee
- Preceded by: Prafulla Chandra Pant; T. Nanda Kumar Singh (acting)
- Succeeded by: Dinesh Maheshwari; T. Nanda Kumar Singh (acting); Sudip Ranjan Sen (acting)

Judge of Allahabad High Court
- In office 30 June 2009 – 26 August 2014
- Nominated by: K. G. Balakrishnan
- Appointed by: Pratibha Patil

Judge of Punjab & Haryana High Court
- In office 2 December 2004 – 29 June 2009
- Nominated by: R. C. Lahoti
- Appointed by: A. P. J. Abdul Kalam

Judge of Madhya Pradesh High Court
- In office 22 October 2001 – 1 December 2004
- Nominated by: A. S. Anand
- Appointed by: K. R. Narayanan

Personal details
- Born: 15 January 1954 (age 72)
- Education: Ewing Christian College University of Allahabad
- Occupation: Judge

Uma Nath Singh (born 15 January 1954) is a retired Indian judge who served as Lokayukta of Nagaland and Chief Justice of Meghalaya High Court.

== Career ==
Justice Singh passed from Ewing Christian College and completed a law degree from the Allahabad University in 1980. He was enrolled as advocate with Bar Council of Delhi on 23 April 1982. He started practice in Delhi High Court as well as in the Supreme Court of India. He was registered as advocate-on-record of the Supreme Court of India in March 1987. He also worked as Central Government advocate in Bhopal Gas Leak Disaster case.

Singh became an Additional Judge in Madhya Pradesh High Court on 22 October 2001. In 2004 he was transferred to Punjab and Haryana High Court. Thereafter Singh was appointed a judge of Allahabad High Court on 30 June 2009. He took oath as the acting Chief Justice of Meghalaya High Court on 27 August 2014. On 19 March 2015 Justice Singh became the Chief Justice of Meghalaya High Court. After his retirement, he was appointed Lokayukta of the state of Nagaland on 19 March 2015. However he had to resign from his post in 2021 after controversy arose from his unjust and arbitrary demands.
