= Amreshwar Pratap Sahi =

Former Chief Justice of Madras High Court

Hon'ble Chief Justice Retd. Amreshwar Pratap Sahi

41st Chief Justice of Madras High Court
- In office 11 November 2019 – 31 December 2020
- Nominated by: Ranjan Gogoi
- Appointed by: Ram Nath Kovind
- Governor: Banwarilal Purohit
- Preceded by: Vineet Kothari (acting)
- Succeeded by: Sanjib Banerjee

42nd Chief Justice of Patna High Court
- In office 17 November 2018 – 10 November 2019
- Nominated by: Ranjan Gogoi
- Appointed by: Ram Nath Kovind
- Governor: Lalji Tandon
- Preceded by: Mukesh Shah
- Succeeded by: Sanjay Karol

Judge of Allahabad High Court
- In office 24 September 2004 – 16 November 2018
- Nominated by: Ramesh Chandra Lahoti
- Appointed by: A.P.J. Abdul Kalam

Personal details
- Born: 1 January 1959 (age 67)

Amreshwar Pratap Sahi (born 1 January 1959) is an Indian retired judge. He is a former Chief Justice of Madras High Court, and Patna High Court and Judge of Allahabad High Court.

== Career ==
Sahi graduated in law in 1985, and enrolled as an advocate of the Allahabad high court on September 6, 1985, where he practiced civil and constitutional matters. He became an additional judge of the Allahabad high court on September 24, 2004 and was confirmed as permanent judge on August 18, 2005.

On 23 October, he was appointed senior most judge of Allahabad High Court. On 10 November 2018, he was appointed chief justice of Patna High Court, and was sworn in on 17 November 2018.

On 11 November 2019, he took oath as chief justice of Madras High Court. He retired on 31 December 2020.
