= Ashok Chopra =

Indian journalist and autobiographer

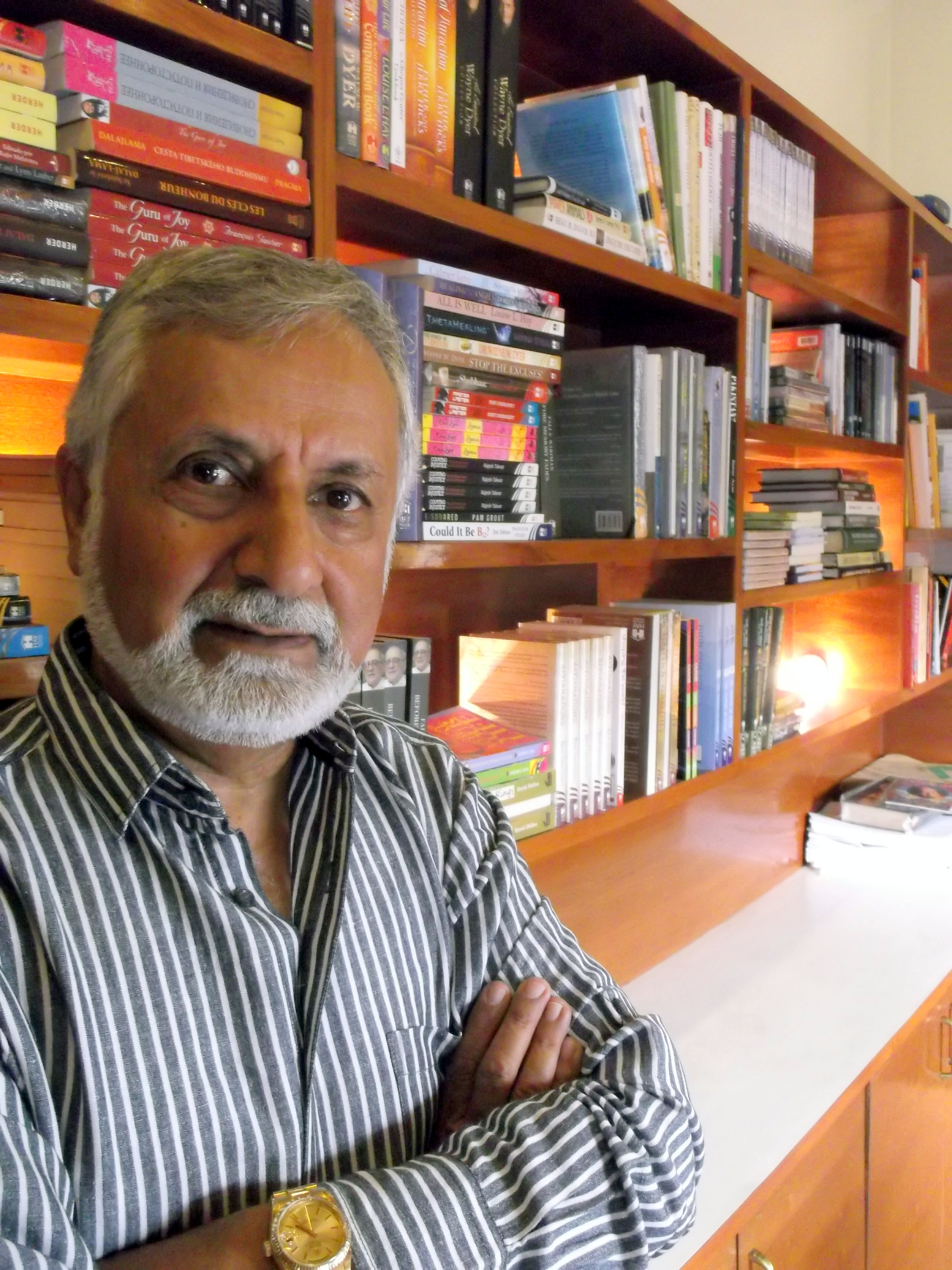
- Ashok Chopra
- Born: 26 February 1949 (age 77); Shimla, Himachal Pradesh, India
- Education: Panjab University; Mass communication
- Occupations: Writer, author, publisher, editor
- Writing career
- Language: English, Hindi
- Genre: Journalism
- Notable work: A Grain Of Sand In The Hourglass of Time: An Autobiography
- Website: Ashok Chopra

Ashok Chopra (born 26 February 1949) is a publisher, author, editor, and literary columnist. Author of Memories of Fire: A Novel, A Scrapbook of Memories: My Life with the Rich, the Famous and the Scandalous and Of Love and Other Sorrows, he has co-authored Agnostic Khushwant: There Is No God with the Indian author-columnist Khushwant Singh and A Grain of Sand in the Hourglass of Time with Arjun Singh, which he completed after his death on March 4, 2011, in 2012. He was executive editor with Vikas Publishing House, vice-president Macmillan India, publishing director UBS Publishers, executive director and publisher of the India Today Book Club and Books Today, as well as chief executive and publisher of HarperCollins Publishers India. Presently, he is the chief executive of Hay House Publishers in India.

== Early life and journalistic career ==
Ashok Chopra was born in Shimla, Himachal Pradesh, the son of an artist, B. R. Chopra. He did his schooling from St. Edward's School, Shimla and went on to do his undergraduate studies from S. D. Bhargava College later. He joined the diploma course in Mass Communication and Journalism in 1971, of the Panjab University in Chandigarh, and further worked with theatre historian Balwant Gargi, for a year, at the Department of Indian Theatre in Chandigarh. From here he embarked to his career in Journalism, in 1973, as a sub-editor with The Tribune (Chandigarh). Besides contributing articles and features regularly he also acted as the paper's film and theatre critic.

In June 1975, he joined the Indian Express Limited as its Himachal Pradesh correspondent based in Shimla. He left journalism for book publishing in April 1978. Chopra also wrote book reviews, features and opinion pieces regularly for India Today.

Presently he lives in Gurgaon.
