= T. Amarnath Goud =

Judge of Tripura High Court

Hon'ble Justice Todupunuri Amarnath Goud

Judge of Tripura High Court
- Incumbent
- Assumed office 28 October 2021
- Nominated by: N. V. Ramana
- Appointed by: Ram Nath Kovind
- Acting Chief Justice
- In office 18 July 2025 – 21 July 2025
- Appointed by: Droupadi Murmu
- Preceded by: Aparesh Kumar Singh
- Succeeded by: M. S. R. Rao
- In office 23 February 2023 – 16 April 2023
- Appointed by: Droupadi Murmu
- Preceded by: Jaswant Singh
- Succeeded by: Aparesh Kumar Singh
- In office 11 November 2022 – 14 February 2023
- Appointed by: Droupadi Murmu
- Preceded by: Indrajit Mahanty
- Succeeded by: Jaswant Singh

Judge of Telangana High Court
- In office 21 September 2017 – 27 October 2021
- Nominated by: Dipak Misra
- Appointed by: Ram Nath Kovind

Personal details
- Born: 1 March 1965 (age 61) Secunderabad
- Education: B.Sc and LL.B
- Alma mater: Shivaji Law College

Todupunuri Amarnath Goud (born 1 March 1965) is an Indian judge. Presently, he is a judge of Tripura High Court and a former judge of Telangana High Court.

== Early life and education ==
He was born on 1 March 1965 in Secunderabad, Telangana. He belongs to the family of philanthropist T.Anjaiah Goud (owner of Paradise Theatre, Secunderabad), who was hid grand father, donated land for burial ground at Kavadiguda, Hyderabad and also statue of Mahatma Gandhi at M. G. Road, Secunderabad, which was unveiled by the then Prime Minister of India Pandit Jawaharlal Nehru in the year 1951. He studied at the St. Patrick's High School, Secunderabad. He obtained B.Sc from Arts and Science College, Secunderabad and LL.B from Shivaji Law College under Marathwada University.

== Career ==
He began his legal journey in 1990 by enrolling as advocate with the Bar Council of Andhra Pradesh on 22 September 1990. He was appointed as a judge of the Telangana High Court on 21 September 2017 and transferred to the Tripura High Court on 28 October 2021. In Tripura he served as executive chairman of Tripura State Legal Services Authority since 30 June 2022 and also served as acting chief justice on three occasions in 2022, 2023 and in 2025.

Justice Goud received Honorary Doctorate from Maharaja Bir Bikram (MBB) University on 29 May 2025 in recognition of his “achievements in exemplary judicial service.”
