= Indra Prasanna Mukerji =

Indian judge (born 1963)

Hon'ble Chief Justice (Retd.) Indra Prasanna Mukerji

13th Chief Justice of Meghalaya High Court
- In office 3 October 2024 – 5 September 2025
- Nominated by: Dhananjaya Y. Chandrachud
- Appointed by: Droupadi Murmu
- Preceded by: S. Vaidyanathan; H. S. Thangkhiew (Acting)
- Succeeded by: Soumen Sen; H. S. Thangkhiew (Acting)

Judge of Calcutta High Court
- In office 18 May 2009 – 2 October 2024
- Nominated by: K. G. Balakrishnan
- Appointed by: Pratibha Patil

Personal details
- Born: 6 September 1963 (age 63) Kolkata, West Bengal, India
- Education: University of Calcutta; University of London

Indra Prasanna Mukerji (born 6 September 1963) is a retired Indian judge who served as 13th Chief Justice of the Meghalaya High Court. He also served as judge of the Calcutta High Court.

== Early life and career ==
Justice Mukerji was born in 1963 into a family of lawyers in Kolkata. His father Deba Prasanna Mukerji and paternal grandfather Iswar Prasanna Mukerji were barristers and Senior Barristers of the Calcutta High Court (equivalent to Queen's Counsel in England). He studied at St. Xavier's School and College, Kolkata and passed law at the University of Calcutta. He was also educated in University of London. After his enrolment as a lawyer on 2 July 1990, Mukerji practised in the Calcutta High Court on the civil side. He became the senior advocate in the panel of Government of India as well as Damodar Valley Corporation. He was appointed as a permanent judge on 18 May 2009 in the Calcutta High Court. On 21 September 2024, Mukerji was made Chief Justice of Meghalaya High Court. He was retired on 5 September 2025 as Chief Justice of Meghalaya High Court. He was ranked 3rd on the All India seniority list of High Court Judges on the date of his retirement. Presently he is serving as the Chairperson of the West Bengal Human Rights Commission.
