= Tapabrata Chakraborty =

Indian Judge (born 1967)

Hon'ble Justice Tapabrata Chakraborty

8th Chief Justice of Telangana High Court
- Nominee
- Assuming office TBD
- Nominated by: Surya Kant
- Succeeding: Aparesh Kumar Singh; P. Sam Koshy (acting)

Judge of Calcutta High Court
- Incumbent
- Assumed office 30 October 2013
- Nominated by: P. Sathasivam
- Appointed by: Pranab Mukherjee
- Acting Chief Justice
- In office 21 June 2026 – 8 September 2026
- Appointed by: Droupadi Murmu
- Preceded by: Sujoy Paul
- Succeeded by: R. V. Ghuge

Personal details
- Born: 27 November 1967 (age 58) Kolkata, West Bengal
- Education: L.L.B, LL.M

Tapabrata Chakraborty (born 27 November 1967) is an Indian judge who is currently judge of the Calcutta High Court. He also served as Acting Chief Justice of Calcutta High Court from June to September 2026.

== Career ==
Chakraborty was born in 1967 into a lawyer family of Kolkata. He obtained LL.B degree and enrolled as Advocate on 29 January 1991. He practised for approximately 22 years, principally before the Calcutta High Court. He practised in Constitutional, Civil, Educational and Service related litigation in the Calcutta High Court. On 30 October 2013, Chakraborty was elevated as Additional Judge of the Calcutta High Court and became permanent on 14 March 2016.

After the retirement of Chief Justice Sujoy Paul, he was appointed as the acting Chief Justice of the Calcutta High Court on 21 June 2026 and held the charge till 7 September 2026 when Ravindra Vithalrao Ghuge was appointed as new permanent chief justice.

On 26 October 2026, Supreme Court collegium recommended his elevation as Chief Justice of Telangana High Court.
