= Ravindra Vithalrao Ghuge =

45th Chief Justice of Calcutta High Court

Hon'ble Chief Justice Ravindra Vithalrao Ghuge
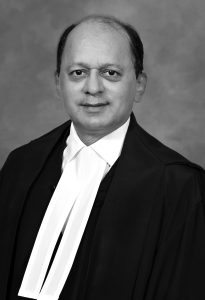

45th Chief Justice of Calcutta High Court
- Incumbent
- Assumed office 9 September 2026
- Nominated by: Surya Kant
- Appointed by: Droupadi Murmu
- Preceding: Sujoy Paul; T. Chakraborty (acting)

Judge of Bombay High Court
- In office 21 June 2013 – 8 September 2026
- Nominated by: Altamas Kabir
- Appointed by: Pranab Mukherjee
- Acting Chief Justice
- In office 2 June 2026 – 8 September 2026
- Appointed by: Droupadi Murmu
- Preceded by: Shree Chandrashekhar
- Succeeded by: Mahesh Chandra Tripathi

Personal details
- Born: 9 July 1966 (age 60)
- Parent: Vithalrao B. Ghuge
- Education: Shahaji Law College, Kolhapur (LL.B)

Ravindra Vithalrao Ghuge (born 9 July 1966) is an Indian judge who is currently serving as the Chief Justice of the Calcutta High Court since 9 September 2026. He is former judge of Bombay High Court where he also served as Acting Chief Justice.

== Early life and education ==
Ghuge was born to Mrs. Meena and Prof. Vithalrao Ghuge, former vice chancellor of Dr. Babasaheb Ambedkar Marathwada University. His early life was shaped in an academically driven environment in Maharashtra. He completed his foundational schooling at St. Xavier’s High School in Kolhapur before pursuing his legal education. He earned his law degree in 1990 after studying at both Chhatrapati Shahaji Law College in Kolhapur and M.P. Law College in Chhatrapati Sambhajinagar (formerly Aurangabad).

== Career ==
He enrolled as advocate in 1990. He built a versatile practice, initially specializing in labour law with over 2,000 cases for workers, before expanding into corporate law, representing multinational entities and the Bar Council of India. Alongside his litigation career, he served as contributory professor for the PG LL.M course in Dr. Babasaheb Ambedkar Marathwada University from 2005 to 2008. He also served as secretary of the Bar Association of Industrial Lawyers, Aurangabad for five years, as well as its president from July 2010 to December 2011.

His judicial career began on 21 June 2013, with his appointment as an Additional Judge of the Bombay High Court, becoming a permanent judge on 2 March 2016. Known for advocating technology in the judiciary, he was appointed Acting Chief Justice of the Bombay High Court on 2 June 2026 following elevation of the then Chief Justice Shree Chandrashekhar to Supreme Court of India. On 6 August 2026, the Supreme Court Collegium recommended his elevation as the permanent Chief Justice of the Calcutta High Court and his appointment has been cleared by government on 5 September 2026. Governor of West Bengal, R. N. Ravi administered oath of office to him on 9 September 2026.

== See also ==
- List of chief justices of the Bombay High Court
