= Sudhir Kakar =

Indian psychologist and writer (1938–2024)

- Born: 25 July 1938; Nainital, United Provinces, British India (now in Uttarakhand, India)
- Died: 22 April 2024 (aged 85)
- Education: University of Mannheim
- Occupations: Novelist, Psychoanalyst, Academician
- Writing career
- Subject: Psychology of religion

Sudhir Kakar (25 July 1938 – 22 April 2024) was an Indian psychoanalyst, novelist and author in the fields of cultural psychology and the psychology of religion.

== Biography ==
Kakar was born on 25 July 1938 in Nainital, a town in present-day Uttarakhand, India. He spent his early childhood near Sargodha, now in Pakistan and also in Rohtak, where his father was an additional district magistrate during the British Raj and during the partition of India, and the family moved quite a bit from city to city. At age eight he was enrolled as a boarder in Modern School, New Delhi; he would later write about homosexual encounters in the school dormitories.

He next attended St. Edward's School, Shimla. He began his Intermediate Studies at Maharaja's College, Jaipur, in 1953 after which his family sent him to Ahmedabad, where Kakar lived with his aunt, Kamla Chowdhry, and attended engineering college. After his B.E. degree in mechanical engineering from Gujarat University 1958, Kakar obtained a master's equivalent in business administration (Dipl.-Kfm.) at the University of Mannheim (1960–64), and a doctor's degree in economics at the University of Vienna. When he returned to India, he encountered psychoanalyst Erik Erikson, who inspired Kakar to train in Freudian psychoanalysis and continued to influence him throughout his career. He began his training in psychoanalysis at the University of Frankfurt's Sigmund Freud Institute in 1971.

In 1975, Sudhir Kakar moved to Delhi with his aunt, Kamla. Kakar resided in Goa and was married to Katharina (born 1967), a German writer and a scholar of comparative religions.

Kakar died on 22 April 2024, at the age of 85. Kakar is survived by his son Rahul Kakar and daughter Shveta Kakar, as well as his partner Katharina Poggendorf-Kakar.

== Career ==
After returning to India in 1975, Sudhir Kakar set up a practice as a psychoanalyst in New Delhi. There, for a short period of time, he was the Head of Department of Humanities and Social Sciences at Indian Institute of Technology (1976–77). He was the 40th Anniversary Senior Fellow at the Center for Study of World Religions at Harvard (2001–02) and a visiting professor at the universities of Chicago (1988–90), McGill (1976–77), Melbourne (1981), Hawaii (1998) and Vienna (1974–75), and at INSEAD, France (1994–2013). He had been a Fellow at the Institute of Advanced Study, Princeton, Wissenschaftskolleg (Institute of Advanced Study), Berlin, Centre for Advanced Study of Humanities, University of Cologne.

Kakar was in private psychoanalytic practice in New Delhi for 25 years before moving in 2003 to his place of residence in Goa, India. Since then he had his practice in Benaulim, a village in Goa. He was a visiting professor at Goa University. He created controversy in a symposium regarding the Death Penalty for Child Rape in 2018 by advocating leniency towards perpetrators of child rape, emphasizing protection of the family reputation and the family bond over the child's safety.

== Psychoanalysis and mysticism ==
A portion of Sudhir Kakar's work involves the relationship between psychoanalysis and mysticism. His analyses of personages include that of Swami Vivekananda in The Inner World (1978), Mohandas Gandhi in Intimate Relations (1989), and Ramakrishna in The Analyst and the Mystic (1991).

Kakar's novel Ecstasy (2003) was "written exclusively for the senses of the skeptic and the mind of the mystic" and "is the beginning of a journey through the soulscape of spiritual India". The story is set in Rajasthan of 1940s or 1960s.

Psychoanalyst Alan Roland (2009) writes that when Kakar applies his psychoanalytic understanding to these "three spiritual figures [Swami Vivekananda, Gandhi, Ramakrishna]", his analyses are as "fully reductionistic as those of Jeffrey Masson". Roland also disputes the Kakar's theoretical understanding of mysticism from a psychoanalytic standpoint, and writes that it is "highly questionable whether spiritual aspirations, practices, and experiences essentially involve regression."

At a personal level, Kakar felt that spirituality for him consists of moments of profound connection with a person, nature, art, music, and for those who believe in God, with the Divine. His spiritual beliefs have been influenced by a combination of a rationalistic, agonistic father and a religious, ritualistic mother.

Some of his general observations on Indian psychology and attitudes are mentioned in V. S. Naipaul's India - A Wounded Civilization.

== Awards and honours ==
- The Boyer Prize for Psychological Anthropology of the American Anthropological Association, 1987
  - For his essay, Sudhir Kakar: “Psychotherapy and Culture: Healing in the Indian Tradition.” in Merry I. White and Susan Pollack, eds., The Cultural Transition: Human Experience and Social Transformation in the Third World and Japan, pp. 9-23, Routledge & Kegan Paul, 1986.
- Order of Merit, Federal Republic of Germany, Feb. 2012
- Distinguished Service Award, Indo-American Psychiatric Association, 2007
- Fellow, National Academy of Psychology, India, 2007
- Member, Academie Universelle des Cultures, France, 2003
- Abraham Kardiner Award, Columbia University, 2002
- Rockefeller Residency, Bellagio. April–May 1999
- Goethe Medal of Goethe Institute, Germany, 1998
- Watumull Distinguished Scholar, University of Hawaii, Spring Semester, 1998
- National Fellow in Psychology, Indian Council of Social Science Research, 1992–94
- MacArthur Research Fellowship, 1993–94
- Jawaharlal Nehru Fellow, 1986–88
  - For a project titled, "The Psychology of Family Relationships in India."
- Homi Bhabha Fellow, 1979-80
- Karolyi Foundation Award for Young Writers, 1963

The French weekly Le Nouvel Observateur profiled Kakar as one of 25 major thinkers of the world.

== Selected Works ==
Non-fiction

- Mad and Divine: Spirit and Psyche in the Modern World
- Inner World: A Psycho-Analytic Study of Childhood and Society in India: Psychoanalytic Study of Childhood and Society in India
- Shamans, Mystics, And Doctors
- Tales Of Love, Sex And Danger
- Intimate Relations
- The Colors Of Violence
- The Indians Die Inder. Porträt einer Gesellschaft (2006)
- Kamasutra (Co-translated with Wendy Doniger)
- Frederick Taylor: A Study in Personality and Innovation
- Understanding Organizational Behavior: Cases and Concepts (co-edited with Kamla Chowdhry)
- Conflict And Choice
- Identity And Adulthood
- The Analyst And The Mystic
- La Folle Et Le Saint
- Culture And Psyche
- The Indian Psyche
- The Essential Writings Of Sudhir Kakar
- A Book of Memory, 2011

Fiction

- The Ascetic Of Desire
- Indian Love Stories (editor)
- Ecstasy
- Mira And The Mahatma
- The Crimson Throne
- The Devil Take Love
- The Kipling File

Posthumous Publication:

Oxford University Press India posthumously published Mind in the World, Selected Writing by Sudhir Kakar, a four-volume collection of Kakar's work and thought, in November 2024. The volumes cover the following topics:

- Volume 1: Sculpting Psychoanalysis in India (Jhuma Basak, ed.)
- Volume 2: Religion and Spirituality (Daniel Meckel, ed.)
- Volume 3: Culture, Mind, and Being (Manasi Kumar, ed.)
- Volume 4: Biography and Psychology (Dinesh Sharma, ed.)

== See also ==
- Girindrasekhar Bose

== Notes ==
- Singh, Khushwant (25 April 2011), "Me and my couch: A review of A Book of Memory—Confessions and Reflections By Sudhir Kakar, Penguin/Viking, Pages: 318, Rs. 499", Outlook, archived from the original on 23 April 2011
