= Sanjay Karol =

Retired Judge of Supreme Court of India (2023-2026)

Hon'ble Justice (Retd.) Sanjay Karol
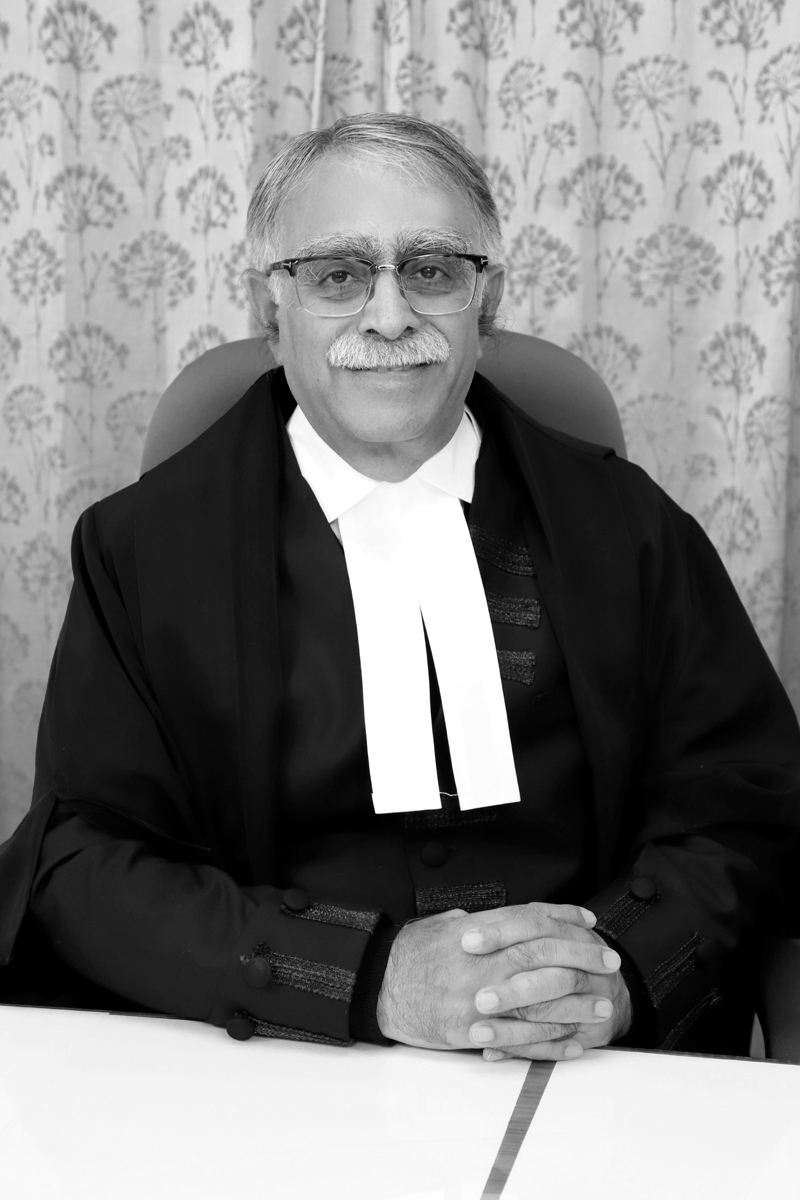

Judge of Supreme Court of India
- In office 6 February 2023 – 22 August 2026
- Nominated by: D. Y. Chandrachud
- Appointed by: Droupadi Murmu

43rd Chief Justice of Patna High Court
- In office 11 November 2019 – 5 February 2023
- Nominated by: Ranjan Gogoi
- Appointed by: Ram Nath Kovind
- Preceded by: Amreshwar Pratap Sahi
- Succeeded by: K. Vinod Chandran; C. S. Singh (acting)

4th Chief Justice of Tripura High Court
- In office 14 November 2018 – 10 November 2019
- Nominated by: Ranjan Gogoi
- Appointed by: Ram Nath Kovind
- Preceded by: Ajay Rastogi; Subhasis Talapatra (acting)
- Succeeded by: Akil Kureshi; Subhasis Talapatra (acting)

Judge of Himachal Pradesh High Court
- In office 8 March 2007 – 13 November 2018
- Nominated by: K. G. Balakrishnan
- Appointed by: A. P. J. Abdul Kalam
- Acting Chief Justice
- In office 25 April 2017 – 4 October 2018
- Appointed by: Pranab Mukherjee
- Preceded by: Mansoor Ahmad Mir
- Succeeded by: Surya Kant

Advocate General of Himachal Pradesh
- In office 30 March 1998 – 1 March 2003
- Appointed by: V. S. Ramadevi
- Chief Minister: Prem Kumar Dhumal
- Preceded by: Chhabil Dass
- Succeeded by: M. S. Chandel

Personal details
- Born: 23 August 1961 (age 65) Shimla
- Education: St. Edward's School, Shimla; Himachal Pradesh University

Sanjay Karol (born 23 August 1961) is a retired judge of the Supreme Court of India. He is a former chief justice of the Patna High Court and Tripura High Court. He has also served as judge and acting chief justice of the Himachal Pradesh High Court. He also served as Advocate General of Himachal Pradesh.

== Early life and background ==
Karol was born in Shimla in 1961. He hails from Garli, a historic village in the Kangra district of Himachal Pradesh. He spent his foundational years in Shimla, completing his schooling at St. Edward's School, Shimla and graduation with History Honours from Government College, Sanjauli. He earned his law degree from Faculty of law, Himachal Pradesh University and in 1986 he was enrolled as an advocate transitioning into legal practice, he quickly built a reputation for excellence, handling diverse matters ranging from constitutional law to corporate and criminal cases. His prowess led to his appointment as the Advocate General of Himachal Pradesh from 1998 to 2003, when Prem Kumar Dhumal became chief minister following 1998 Himachal Pradesh Legislative Assembly election. In 1999 he was designated as senior advocate of Himachal Pradesh High Court.

== Career ==
His judicial trajectory began on 8 March 2007, when he was elevated as a judge of the Himachal Pradesh High Court, where he also served as the Acting Chief Justice from 25 April 2017 till appointment of Surya Kant as permanent chief justice on 5 October 2018. A pivotal chapter of his leadership unfolded when he was appointed Chief Justice of the Tripura High Court on 14 November 2018. During his brief yet transformative tenure there, Justice Karol gained national attention by dramatically cutting the High Court's case pendency by more than half, streamlining judicial administration, and actively visiting remote regions to improve legal access. On 11 November 2019, he took charge as the Chief Justice of the Patna High Court, one of the oldest and busiest high courts in India. There, he navigated complex administrative challenges and oversaw a massive push toward digitization and infrastructure upgrades during the COVID-19 pandemic.

Recognising his experience, the Supreme Court Collegium recommended his elevation to the Supreme Court of India on 13 December 2022. However central government cleared his appointment only in February 2023 and he took oath on 6 February 2023. At the apex court, Justice Karol established himself, authoring 273 judgments during his tenure. Beyond the volume of his output, he was celebrated for his compassionate, human-centric courtroom approach. He avoided using harsh or abrupt legal language, ensuring that a litigant walked away feeling fully heard. His judgments frequently began with narrative summaries and prose, reflecting a sense of empathy for the marginalized and vulnerable segments of society.

Justice Karol’s legal legacy is marked by landmark rulings that structurally advanced social and economic equity in India. In a progressive step for gender justice, he co-authored a judgment establishing a new monetary compensation framework for the "loss of domestic care" under the Motor Vehicles Act, legally recognizing and quantifying the unpaid labour of homemakers as vital "nation-builders." He strongly championed the rights of tribal women by ruling that they are entitled to an equal share of ancestral property, dismantling historical succession bars. Furthermore, he vigorously defended elder welfare, upholding the right of senior citizens to reclaim properties gifted to their children if they are subsequently neglected. His retirement on 22 August 2026 marked the conclusion of nearly two decades of exemplary judicial service that bridged rigorous legal orthodoxy with compassionate social engineering.
