= T. Vaiphei =

Former Chief Justice of Tripura High Court

Hon'ble Chief Justice (Retd.) Tinilangthang Vaiphei

2nd Chief Justice of Tripura High Court
- In office 21 September 2016 – 28 February 2018; Acting CJ : 16 May 2016 - 20 September 2016
- Nominated by: T. S. Thakur
- Appointed by: Pranab Mukherjee
- Preceded by: Deepak Gupta
- Succeeded by: Ajay Rastogi

Judge of Gauhati High Court
- In office 17 July 2003 – 15 May 2016
- Nominated by: V. N. Khare
- Appointed by: A. P. J. Abdul Kalam
- Acting Chief Justice
- In office 21 October 2015 – 4 March 2016
- Appointed by: Pranab Mukherjee
- Preceded by: A. M. Sapre; K. Sreedhar Rao (acting)
- Succeeded by: Ajit Singh

Personal details
- Born: 1 March 1956 (age 70)
- Education: B.A., LL.B
- Alma mater: Nowrosjee Wadia College; Faculty of Law, University of Delhi

Tinilangthang Vaiphei (born 1 March 1956) is a retired Indian judge and former Chief Justice of the High Court of Tripura. He is the judge from the Kuki-Vaiphei community to be elevated to the position of Chief Justice of High Courts of India.

== Early life ==
Vaiphei was born in 1956. He passed B.A. in 1976 from Nowrosjee Wadia College of University of Poona and in 1979 he passed LL.B. from Faculty of Law, University of Delhi.

== Career ==
Vaiphei became enrolled in the Bar Council of Assam in 1980 and started practice in the lower courts of Manipur in Criminal and Civil side. He also worked in Constitutional and Service Matters in the Imphal Bench of the Gauhati High Court in 1990. In 1997 he shifted to Mizoram and was appointed Assistant Advocate General of Mizoram on 12 February 1999. On 15 September 2000, Vaiphei became Additional Advocate General of Mizoram. He was elevated as Additional Judge of the Gauhati High Court on 17 July 2003. Justice Vaiphei also took charge of the acting Chief Justice of the High Court. He was appointed the Chief Justice of the Tripura High Court on 21 September 2016 and retired on 28 February 2018. After the retirement he was appointed the Chairperson of Assam Human Rights Commission in 2018.
