= Tripura High Court =

High Court for the Indian State Tripura

- Established: 23 March 2013; 13 years ago
- Jurisdiction: Tripura
- Location: Agartala, Tripura
- Composition method: Presidential with confirmation of Chief Justice of India and Governor of respective state.
- Authorised by: Constitution of India
- Appeals to: Supreme Court of India
- Judge term length: Mandatory retirement by age of 62
- Number of positions: 4
- Website: thc.nic.in

Chief Justice
- Currently: M. S. Ramachandra Rao
- Since: 22 July 2025

The Tripura High Court is the High Court of the state of Tripura. It was established on 23 March 2013, after making suitable amendments in the Constitution of India and North-Eastern Areas (Reorganisation) Act, 1971. The seat of the High Court is at Agartala, the capital of Tripura. The first Chief Justice was Justice Deepak Gupta (23 March 2013 to 16 May 2016) Earlier, the state of Tripura along with the other six states of the North - East of India was under the Guwahati High Court, a permanent bench of the Guwahati High Court was established in Agartala in the year 1992 having territorial jurisdiction of the state of Tripura.

The current chief justice is M.S. Ramachandra Rao. He took oath on 22 April 2025.

== List of chief justices ==
#	Portrait	Chief justice	Tenure	
#	Portrait	Chief justice	Start	End
1		Leonard Stone (judge)	1947	1947
2		Ronald Francis Lodge	1947	1948
3		T V Thadani	1948	1949
4		Sarjoo Prasad	1949	1950
5		Chandreswar Prasad Sinha	1950	1952
6		Holiram Deka	1952	1952
7		G. Mehrotra	1952	1953
(6)		Holiram Deka	1954	1957
(7)		G. Mehrotra	1957	1958
(6)		Holiram Deka	1958	1960
(7)		G. Mehrotra	1960	1965
8		C. S. Row Nayudu	1965	1970
(7)		G. Mehrotra	1970	1973
9		S. K. Dutta	1973	1973
(8)		C. S. Row Nayudu	1973	1974
(9)		S. K. Dutta	1974	1975
10		M. C. Pathak	1975	1976
11		M. S. Swamy	1976	1977
(10)		M. C. Pathak	1977	1978
(11)		M. S. Swamy	1978	1978
12		C. M. Lodha	6 July 1978	10 March 1979
13		Debi Singh Tewatia	10 March 1979	30 September 1985
14		P. C. Reddy	30 September 1985	2 November 1986
15		K. M. Lahiri	1986	1986
16		T. S. Misra	1986	1988
17		G. M. Lodha	1 March 1988	15 March 1988
18		A. S. Raghuvir	6 May 1988	21 March 1991
19		R. K. Manisana Singh	27 January 1994	1 February 1994
20		V. K. Khanna	1 February 1994	14 February 1997
21		M. Ramakrishna	18 June 1997	12 February 1999
22		Brijesh Kumar	12 February 1999	19 October 2000
23		N. C. Jain	20 October 2000	5 April 2001
24		R. S. Mongia	5 April 2001	10 June 2002
25		P. P. Naolekar	10 June 2002	27 August 2004
26		Binod Kumar Roy	27 August 2004	5 December 2005
27		B. S. Reddy	5 December 2005	12 January 2007
28		Jasti Chelameswar	12 January 2007	17 March 2010
29		Ramesh Surajmal Garg	17 April 2010	18 June 2010
30		Madan Lokur	18 June 2010	20 December 2011
31		Adarsh Kumar Goel	20 December 2011	23 March 2013
32		Deepak Gupta	23 March 2013	15 May 2016
33		T. Vaiphei	21 September 2016	28 February 2018
34		Ajay Rastogi	1 March 2018	1 November 2018
35		Sanjay Karol	14 November 2018	10 November 2019
36		Akil Abdulhamid Kureshi	16 November 2019	11 October 2021
37		Indrajit Mahanty	12 October 2021	10 November 2022
38		Jaswant Singh	15 February 2023	22 February 2023
39		Aparesh Kumar Singh	13 April 2023	15 July 2025
40		Justice Ramachandra Rao	13 April 2025	—

== Chief Justices ==
#	Chief Justice	Parent high court	Assumed office	Left office	Term length	Appointer
1	Justice Deepak Gupta	Himachal Pradesh High Court	23 March 2013	15 May 2016	3 years, 53 days	Pranab Mukherjee
–	Justice T. Vaiphei (acting)	Gauhati High Court	16 May 2016	20 September 2016	127 days	Pranab Mukherjee
2	Justice T. Vaiphei	Gauhati High Court	21 September 2016	28 February 2018	1 year, 160 days	Pranab Mukherjee
3	Justice Ajay Rastogi	Rajasthan High Court	1 March 2018	1 November 2018	245 days	Ram Nath Kovind
–	Justice Subhasis Talapatra (acting)	Gauhati High Court	2 November 2018	13 November 2018	11 days	Ram Nath Kovind
4	Justice Sanjay Karol	Himachal Pradesh High Court	14 November 2018	10 November 2019	361 days	Ram Nath Kovind
–	Justice Subhasis Talapatra (acting)	Gauhati High Court	11 November 2019	15 November 2019	4 days	Ram Nath Kovind
5	Justice Akil Kureshi	Gujarat High Court	16 November 2019	11 October 2021	1 year, 329 days	Ram Nath Kovind
6	Justice Indrajit Mahanty	Orissa High Court	12 October 2021	10 November 2022	1 year, 29 days	Ram Nath Kovind
–	Justice T. Amarnath Goud (acting)	Telangana High Court	11 November 2022	14 February 2023	95 days	Droupadi Murmu
7	Justice Jaswant Singh	Punjab and Haryana High Court	15 February 2023	22 February 2023	7 days	Droupadi Murmu
–	Justice T. Amarnath Goud (acting)	Telangana High Court	23 February 2023	16 April 2023	52 days	Droupadi Murmu
8	Justice Aparesh Kumar Singh	Jharkhand High Court	17 April 2023	15 July 2025	2 years, 89 days	Droupadi Murmu
9	Justice M. S. Ramachandra Rao	Telangana High Court	22 July 2025	Incumbent		Droupadi Murmu

== Judges elevated as Chief Justices ==
This sections contains list of only those judges elevated as chief justices whose parent high court is Tripura. This includes those judges who, at the time of appointment as chief justice, may not be serving in Tripura High Court but this list does not include judges who at the time of appointment as chief justice were serving in Tripura High Court but does not have Tripura as their Parent High Court.

Colour Key

- Female Chief Justice
- Served as Chief Justice of India

Symbol Key

- ^{‡} Elevated to Supreme Court of India
- ^{RES} Resigned
- ^{†} Died in office

Name	Image	Appointed as CJ in HC of	Date of appointment		Date of retirement (Note: this includes date of resignation, death and elevation to supreme court)	Tenure	
Name	Image	Appointed as CJ in HC of	As Judge	As Chief Justice	Date of retirement	As Chief Justice	As Judge (Note: also includes tenure as Chief Justice)
Subhasis Talapatra		Orissa	15 November 2011	8 August 2023	3 October 2023	57 days	11 years, 323 days

== Notable people ==
- Satya Gopal Chattopadhyay (born 1963), High Court judge (2020–2022)
