= Ministry of Law =

Ministry of Law may refer to:

- Ministry of Justice and Law (Colombia)
- Ministry of Law and Justice (India)
- Ministry of Law and Human Rights (Indonesia)
- Ministry of Security and Justice (Netherlands)
- Ministry of Law (Singapore)
- Ministry of Justice (Sri Lanka)
- Ministry of Law, Justice and Parliamentary Affairs for Bangladesh
- Ministry of Law and Justice (Pakistan)
  - Minister for Law and Justice (Pakistan)

== See also ==
- Law ministry (United Kingdom), the British government led by Bonar Law from 1922 to 1923
- Ministry of Justice
- Federal Ministry of Justice (disambiguation)
