= Soumen Sen =

40th Chief Justice of Kerala High Court

Hon'ble Chief Justice Soumen Sen

40th Chief Justice of Kerala High Court
- Incumbent
- Assumed office 10 January 2026
- Nominated by: Surya Kant
- Appointed by: Droupadi Murmu
- Preceded by: N. M. Jamdar

14th Chief Justice of Meghalaya High Court
- In office 8 October 2025 – 9 January 2026
- Nominated by: B. R. Gavai
- Appointed by: Droupadi Murmu
- Preceded by: I. P. Mukerji; H. S. Thangkhiew (acting)
- Succeeded by: Revati Prashant Mohite Dere

Judge of Calcutta High Court
- In office 13 April 2011 – 7 October 2025
- Nominated by: S. H. Kapadia
- Appointed by: Pratibha Patil
- Acting Chief Justice
- In office 16 September 2025 – 7 October 2025
- Appointed by: Droupadi Murmu
- Preceded by: T. S. Sivagnanam
- Succeeded by: Sujoy Paul (acting)

Personal details
- Born: 27 July 1965 (age 60) Kolkata, West Bengal, India
- Education: LL. B.
- Alma mater: University of Calcutta

Soumen Sen (born 27 July 1965) is an Indian judge, who is currently serving as Chief Justice of the Kerala High Court. Previously, he has also served as chief justice of Meghalaya High Court. He is a former judge of Calcutta High Court, where he also served as its Acting Chief Justice.

== Early life and career ==
Justice Soumen Sen was born in Kolkata, West Bengal. He studied at St. Lawrence High School, Kolkata, and passed the LL.B. Examination from the University of Calcutta in 1990 and stood first in the said examination by securing the highest marks. He was enrolled as an advocate with the Bar Council of West Bengal in 1991.

He practiced as an advocate in the Calcutta High Court for 20 years on both original and appellate side and also before other courts and tribunals. He appeared in a wide range of matters, including civil, constitutional, banking, and arbitration cases, representing authorities such as the RBI, SEBI, SIDBI and was also designated as Senior Advocate.

He was as appointed as Judge of Calcutta High Court on 13 April 2011 and was appointed as the acting Chief Justice of Calcutta High Court consequent upon the retirement of the then Chief Justice T. S. Sivagnanam on 15 September 2025.

On 11 September 2025 Supreme Court Collegium led by CJI B. R. Gavai recommended him to be appointed as Chief Justice of Meghalaya High Court. He was appointed as Chief Justice of Meghalaya High Court 26 September 2025 and took oath on 8 October 2025 in ceremony held at Raj Bhavan, Shillong.

On 18 December 2025, Supreme court collegium headed by CJI Surya Kant recommended his transfer as chief justice of Kerala High Court this was cleared by government on 1 January 2026 and he was sworn in on 10 January 2026.
