= Navin Sinha =

Retired judge of Supreme Court of India

Hon'ble Justice (Retd.) Navin Sinha
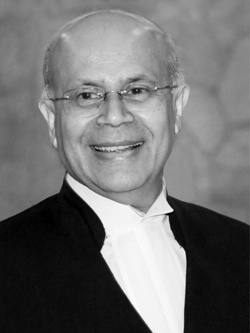

Judge of Supreme Court of India
- In office 17 February 2017 – 18 August 2021
- Nominated by: J. S. Khehar
- Appointed by: Pranab Mukherjee

34th Chief Justice of Rajasthan High Court
- In office 14 May 2016 – 16 February 2017
- Nominated by: T. S. Thakur
- Appointed by: Pranab Mukherjee
- Preceded by: Satish Kumar Mittal; Ajay Rastogi (acting)
- Succeeded by: Pradeep Nandrajog; K. S. Jhaveri (acting)

9th Chief Justice of Chhattisgarh High Court
- In office 9 April 2015 – 13 May 2016
- Nominated by: H. L. Dattu
- Appointed by: Pranab Mukherjee
- Preceded by: Yatindra Singh
- Succeeded by: Deepak Gupta

Judge of Chhattisgarh High Court
- In office 9 July 2014 – 8 April 2015; Acting CJ : 9 October 2014 - 8 April 2015
- Nominated by: R. M. Lodha
- Appointed by: Pranab Mukherjee

Judge of Patna High Court
- In office 4 February 2004 – 8 July 2014
- Nominated by: V. N. Khare
- Appointed by: A. P. J. Abdul Kalam

Personal details
- Born: 19 August 1956 (age 70)
- Education: LL.B
- Alma mater: Hindu College, Delhi, Faculty of Law, University of Delhi

Navin Sinha (born 19 August 1957) is a former judge of the Supreme Court of India. He had served as chief justice of Rajasthan High Court and Chhattisgarh High Court. He is also former judge of the Patna High Court.

== Early life and education ==
Sinha was born on 19 August 1957 in a Kayastha family of lawyers/administrators. His grandfather Babu Baldev Sahay was the first Advocate general of Bihar and his father Benoy Sinha retired as Additional secretary in Ministry of Power. Sinha did his schooling at St. Xavier's High School, Patna, and passed out in 1972. He did his graduation from Hindu College, Delhi and his Bachelor of Laws from the Campus Law Centre of the Faculty of Law, University of Delhi, in 1979.

== Career ==
Sinha joined bar on 26 July 1979 and practised for 23 years primarily at Patna High Court and specialised in civil, constitutional, labour, service, commercial, company, criminal laws. He was elevated as a judge there. He was made a permanent judge of Patna High Court on 4 February 2004. He was transferred to the Chhattisgarh High Court on 9 July 2014 and was made its acting chief justice in October 2014 upon retirement of the then chief justice Yatindra Singh. He was made permanent chief justice on 9 April 2015. In May 2016 he was transferred to Rajasthan High Court and was sworn in as the new chief justice of the Rajasthan High Court on 14 May 2016. He was administered the oath as the 34th chief justice of the Rajasthan High Court by Governor Kalyan Singh.

In February 2017, he was elevated to Supreme Court of India along with four other judges. and retired in August 2021 after successful tenure of more than 4.5 years.
