= T. S. Sivagnanam =

Former Chief Justice of Calcutta High Court

Hon'ble Chief Justice (Retd.) Tirunelveli Subbiah Sivagnanam

43rd Chief Justice of Calcutta High Court
- In office 11 May 2023 – 15 September 2025; Acting: 31 March 2023 — 10 May 2023
- Nominated by: D. Y. Chandrachud
- Appointed by: Droupadi Murmu
- Preceded by: Prakash Shrivastava
- Succeeded by: Soumen Sen (acting); Sujoy Paul

Judge of Calcutta High Court
- In office 25 October 2021 – 10 May 2023
- Nominated by: N. V. Ramana
- Appointed by: Ram Nath Kovind

Judge of Madras High Court
- In office 31 March 2009 – 24 October 2021
- Nominated by: K. G. Balakrishnan
- Appointed by: Pratibha Patil

Personal details
- Born: 16 September 1963 (age 63) Madras, Madras State (now Chennai, Tamil Nadu), India
- Parent(s): Dr. T. S. Subbiah; Nalini Subbiah
- Education: Loyola College, Chennai (B.Sc.); Dr. Ambedkar Government Law College, Chennai (L.L.B.)

Tirunelveli Subbiah Sivagnanam (born 16 September 1963) is a retired Indian judge who served as the 43rd Chief Justice of Calcutta High Court. He is a former judge of Calcutta High Court and Madras High Court.

== Early life ==
Sivagnanam was born to Dr. T. S. Subbiah and Nalini Subbiah. He was born on 16 September 1963. He completed his B.Sc. degree at Loyola College, Chennai, obtained his L.L.B degree from Dr. Ambedkar Government Law College, Chennai and enrolled in the Bar Council of Tamil Nadu on 10 September 1986.

== As an advocate ==
After enrollment, Justice Sivagnanam joined the chamber of Mr. R. Gandhi, Senior Advocate. Justice Sivagnanam was appointed Additional Central Government Standing Counsel during 2000.

== As judge of high court ==
Justice Sivagnanam was appointed Additional Judge, of the High Court of Madras on 31 March 2009 and later he was appointed Permanent Judge on 29 March 2011. He is the Chairman for the Computer Committee of the High Court of Madras. He was transferred as a Judge of Calcutta High Court and took oath on 25 October 2021. On 11 May 2023, he took oath as the Chief Justice of Calcutta High Court. He retired as Calcutta Chief Justice on 15 September 2025 after serving a tenure of over 2 years. He was at the 2nd rank in the all India seniority list of high court judges on the date of his retirement.

== TNSJA ==
Justice T. S. Sivagnanam is one of the Members of the Board of Governors of the TNSJA (Tamil Nadu State Judicial Academy).

== Virtual hearings ==
During the COVID - 19 pandemic, the Computer Committee of the High Court of Madras, headed by Justice T.S. Sivagnanam had decided to purchase 100 Licences of "MicrosoftTeam" for conducting Virtual Hearing of the Cases by all Judicial Officers in the State of Tamil Nadu.

== Electronic processes ==
Another important step taken by the Computer Committee of the High Court of Madras, headed by Justice T. S. Sivagnanam, was to introduce NSTEP (National Service and Tracking of Electronic Process). By purchasing 1200 Smart Phones for the Process Servers, the Service of the Court Processes was made easy, simple within a short span of time.

== Important cases ==
=== Mines case ===
In an Important case, Justices T. S. Sivagnanam and G. Jayachandran passed an order of winding up the commission headed by IAS officer U. Sagayam. This case was relating to the appointment of former Madurai District Collector Sagayam as Special Officer/Legal Commissioner to conduct probe into all granite mining contracts and licences given to various private companies in Tamil Nadu.

Sterlite Plant Case

Justices T. S. Sivagnanam and V. Bhavani Subbaroyan in a judgement dismissed a batch of 10 petitions filed by Vedanta on behalf of the Sterlite Copper Plant at Thoothukudi.

Income Tax Notice case

Justice T. S. Sivagnanam had allowed writ petitions filed by P. Chidambaram (former Finance Minister of India) and his family members, challenging the demand notices saying there was reason to believe that income chargeable to tax had escaped assessment. Mr. Chidambaram submitted that he and his family grow coffee and after pulping and drying, sell the raw coffee. Proceeds of its sale are agricultural income exempted from the applicability of Section 10(1) of the Income Tax Act.
