= Ajay Rastogi =

Indian judge (born 1958)

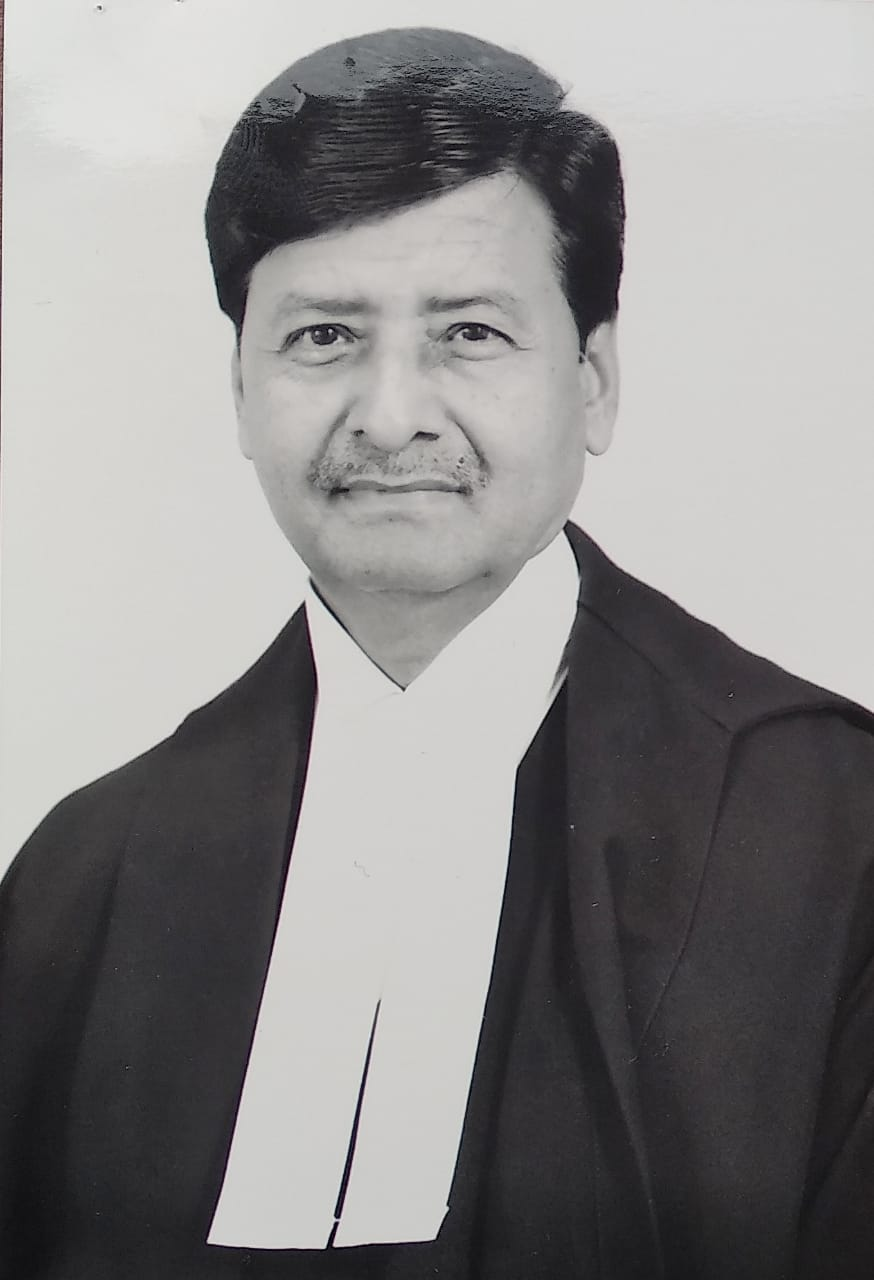

Judge of Supreme Court of India
- In office 2 November 2018 – 17 June 2023
- Nominated by: Ranjan Gogoi
- Appointed by: Ramnath Kovind

3rd Chief Justice of Tripura High Court
- In office 1 March 2018 – 1 November 2018
- Nominated by: Dipak Misra
- Appointed by: Ramnath Kovind
- Preceded by: T. Vaiphei
- Succeeded by: Sanjay Karol; Subhasis Talapatra (acting)

Judge of Rajasthan High Court
- In office 4 September 2004 – 28 February 2018
- Nominated by: R. C. Lahoti
- Appointed by: A. P. J. Abdul Kalam
- Acting Chief Justice
- In office 15 April 2016 – 13 May 2016
- Appointed by: Pranab Mukherjee
- Preceded by: Satish Kumar Mittal
- Succeeded by: Navin Sinha

Personal details
- Born: 18 June 1958 (age 68) Jaipur, Rajasthan, India

Ajay Rastogi (born 18 June 1958) is a former judge of Supreme Court of India. He is also former chief justice of Tripura High Court and judge of Rajasthan High Court.

== Career ==
Justice Ajay Rastogi, B.Com., LL.B., was born in 1958. He was enrolled as an Advocate in 1982 and practiced in the Rajasthan High Court in Constitutional, Civil Service and Labour matters. His field of specialization is service and labour law. He was appointed an additional judge of the Rajasthan High Court on 2 September 2004 and permanent judge on 29 May 2006. He was appointed as acting chief justice of Rajasthan High Court in 2016. He was appointed chief justice of the Tripura High Court on 1 March 2018. He was appointed judge of Supreme Court of India on 2 November 2018. He retired on 17 June 2023.

Over the course of his tenure on the Supreme Court, Rastogi authored 158 judgments. Rastogi was a member of benches that heard arguments on challenges to the practice of Jallikattu, decriminalising adultery, and a right to euthanasia.
