= Meghalaya High Court =

High Court for Indian State of Meghalaya

- Established: 23 March 2013; 13 years ago
- Jurisdiction: Meghalaya
- Location: Shillong, Meghalaya
- Composition method: Presidential with confirmation of Chief Justice of India and Governor of respective state.
- Authorised by: Constitution of India
- Appeals to: Supreme Court of India
- Judge term length: Till 62 years of age
- Number of positions: 4
- Website: meghalayahighcourt.nic.in

Chief Justice
- Currently: Revati Prashant Mohite Dere
- Since: 10 January 2026

The Meghalaya High Court is the High Court of the state of Meghalaya, India. It was established in March 2013, after making suitable amendments in the Constitution of India and North-Eastern Areas (Re-organisation) Act of 1971. Earlier, a bench of the Gauhati High Court had jurisdiction over the state of Meghalaya. The seat of the High Court is at Shillong, the capital of Meghalaya. This court has four permanent judges, including the Hon'ble Chief Justice and three Hon'ble Judges.

== List of Chief Justices ==
#	Chief Justice	Parent high court	Assumed office	Left office	Term length	Appointer
1	T. Meena Kumari	Andhra Pradesh	23 March 2013	3 August 2013	133 days	Pranab Mukherjee
–	T. Nandakumar Singh (acting)	Gauhati	4 August 2013	19 September 2013	46 days	Pranab Mukherjee
2	Prafulla Chandra Pant	Uttarakhand	20 September 2013	12 August 2014	326 days	Pranab Mukherjee
–	T. Nandakumar Singh (acting)	Gauhati	13 August 2014	26 August 2014	13 days	Pranab Mukherjee
–	Uma Nath Singh (acting)	Madhya Pradesh	27 August 2014	18 March 2015	203 days	Pranab Mukherjee
3	Uma Nath Singh	Madhya Pradesh	19 March 2015	14 January 2016	301 days	Pranab Mukherjee
–	T. Nandakumar Singh (acting)	Gauhati	15 January 2016	23 February 2016	39 days	Pranab Mukherjee
4	Dinesh Maheshwari	Rajasthan	24 February 2016	12 February 2018	1 year, 353 days	Pranab Mukherjee
5	Tarun Agarwala	Allahabad	12 February 2018	2 March 2018	18 days	Ram Nath Kovind
–	Sudip Ranjan Sen (acting)	Gauhati	3 March 2018	20 May 2018	78 days	Ram Nath Kovind
6	Mohammad Yaqoob Mir	Jammu and Kashmir	21 May 2018	27 May 2019	1 year, 6 days	Ram Nath Kovind
7	Ajay Kumar Mittal	Punjab and Haryana	28 May 2019	2 November 2019	158 days	Ram Nath Kovind
8	Mohammad Rafiq	Rajasthan	13 November 2019	26 April 2020	165 days	Ram Nath Kovind
9	Biswanath Somadder	Calcutta	27 April 2020	11 October 2021	1 year, 167 days	Ram Nath Kovind
10	Ranjit Vasantrao More	Bombay	12 October 2021	3 November 2021	22 days	Ram Nath Kovind
–	Hamarsan Singh Thangkhiew (acting)	Meghalaya	4 November 2021	23 November 2021	19 days	Ram Nath Kovind
11	Sanjib Banerjee	Calcutta	24 November 2021	1 November 2023	1 year, 342 days	Ram Nath Kovind
–	Hamarsan Singh Thangkhiew (acting)	Meghalaya	2 November 2023	10 February 2024	100 days	Droupadi Murmu
12	S. Vaidyanathan	Madras	11 February 2024	16 August 2024	196 days	Droupadi Murmu
–	Hamarsan Singh Thangkhiew (acting)	Meghalaya	17 August 2024	2 October 2024	46 days	Droupadi Murmu
13	Indra Prasanna Mukerji	Calcutta	3 October 2024	5 September 2025	337 days	Droupadi Murmu
–	Hamarsan Singh Thangkhiew (acting)	Meghalaya	6 September 2025	7 October 2025	31 days	Droupadi Murmu
14	Soumen Sen	Calcutta	8 October 2025	9 January 2026	93 days	Droupadi Murmu
15	Revati Prashant Mohite Dere	Bombay	10 January 2026	Incumbent	191 days	Droupadi Murmu
