= Akil Kureshi =

38th Chief Justice of Rajasthan High Court

Hon'ble Chief Justice (Retd.) Akil Kureshi
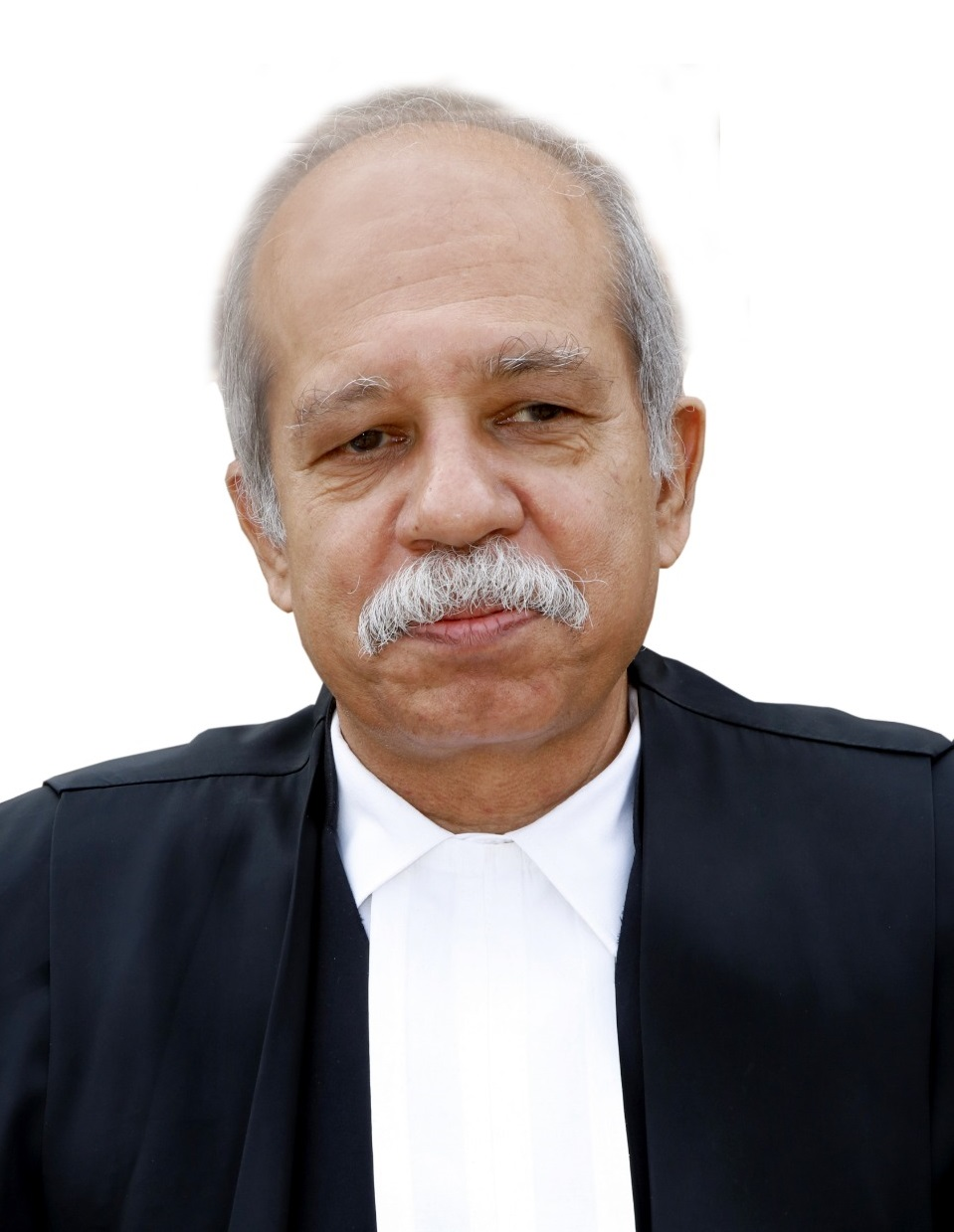

38th Chief Justice of Rajasthan High Court
- In office 12 October 2021 – 6 March 2022
- Nominated by: N. V. Ramana
- Appointed by: Ram Nath Kovind
- Preceded by: Indrajit Mahanty
- Succeeded by: S. S. Shinde; M. M. Shrivastava (acting)

5th Chief Justice of Tripura High Court
- In office 16 November 2019 – 11 October 2021
- Nominated by: Ranjan Gogoi
- Appointed by: Ram Nath Kovind
- Preceded by: Sanjay Karol; Subhasis Talapatra (acting)
- Succeeded by: Indrajit Mahanty

Judge of Bombay High Court
- In office 14 November 2018 – 15 November 2019
- Nominated by: Ranjan Gogoi
- Appointed by: Ram Nath Kovind

Judge of Gujarat High Court
- In office 7 March 2004 – 13 November 2018
- Nominated by: V. N. Khare
- Appointed by: A. P. J. Abdul Kalam
- Acting Chief Justice
- In office 2 November 2018 – 13 November 2018
- Appointed by: Ram Nath Kovind
- Preceded by: R. Subhash Reddy
- Succeeded by: Vikram Nath; A. S. Dave (acting)

Personal details
- Born: Akil Abdul Hamid Kureshi; 7 March 1960 (age 66)
- Education: B.Sc. (Mathematics) and LL.B

Akil Abdul Hamid Kureshi (born 7 March 1960) is an Indian retired judge. He is a former Chief Justice of Rajasthan High Court and Tripura High Court. He has also served as a judge of Bombay High Court and Gujarat High Court, and as an Acting Chief Justice of the latter.

== Career ==
Justice Kureshi passed B.Sc. (Mathematics) in 1980 and LL.B. in 1983. He joined the Bar and started his legal practice in the Gujarat High Court from July 1983. He was appointed the Additional Central Government Standing Counsel from March 1992 to March 1998 and the Additional Counsel for the Income-tax Department in January 2000 where he represented Income Tax Department in the Gujarat High Court up to December 2001. He was appointed an additional judge of the Gujarat High Court on 7 March 2004 and became a permanent judge on 12 August 2005.

Kureshi was appointed Acting Chief Justice of the High Court of Gujarat on 2 November 2018. He was transferred to the Bombay High Court on 14 November 2018. He took oath as the Chief Justice of Tripura High Court on 16 November 2019.

On 9 October 2021, he was appointed the Chief Justice of the Rajasthan High Court and took oath on 12 October 2021 and retired on 7 March 2022 without being elevated to Supreme Court of India. His non elevation to supreme court was matter of great debate as he was denied elevation in spite of year long tussle in supreme court collegium, whose member Justice Rohinton Fali Nariman, blocked all collegium appointments until his retirement in August 2021 for want of Justice Kureshi's elevation to supreme court.
