= M. Duraiswamy =

Former Acting Chief Justice of Madras High Court

Hon'ble Justice (Retd.) M. Duraiswamy

Acting Chief Justice of Madras High Court
- In office 13 September 2022 – 21 September 2022
- Appointed by: Droupadi Murmu
- In office 17 November 2021 – 22 November 2021
- Appointed by: Ram Nath Kovind

Judge of Madras High Court
- In office 31 March 2009 – 21 September 2022
- Nominated by: K. G. Balakrishnan
- Appointed by: Pratibha Patil

Personal details
- Born: 22 September 1960 (age 65)

M. Duraiswamy (born 22 September 1960) is an Indian Judge. He is former Acting Chief Justice of Madras High Court.
