= Khallikote Unitary University =

Public unitary university in Odisha, India

Coordinates: 19.3075°N 84.7944°E

- Motto: Tamso Ma Jyotirgamaya
- Motto in English: From darkness, lead me to light
- Type: Public
- Established: 1878; 148 years ago (as College); 2021; 5 years ago (as University)
- Academic affiliations: UGC
- Chancellor: Governor of Odisha
- Vice-Chancellor: Asima Sahu
- Faculty: 112
- Location: Brahmapur, Odisha, 760001, India
- Campus: 16.72 acres (6.77 ha); Urban
- Website: kuu.ac.in

Khallikote Unitary University, formerly known as Khallikote Autonomous College, is a co-educational state university situated in Brahmapur, Odisha on the eastern coast of India. One of the oldest educational institutes in Odisha, it was founded as Union College in 1878, and became a university in 2021. The university has a student enrolment of nearly 5,000.

== History ==
The present university began as a Government Zilla School in 1856 and later upgraded for Intermediate classes (F.A. classes) with the name of Union College in 1878. And subsequently changed its name to Native College. With major financial crisis in around 1893, for the survival of the institution the District Magistrate of Ganjam (A.W.B. Higgins, ICS) approached the Raja Saheb Harihar Mardaraj Deo of Khallikote who donated a lakh of rupees for the endowment fund. It was renamed in 1893 as Khallikote College in the honor of the late Raja.

The college was affiliated to Madras University until 1936, when it was affiliated to Patna University. In 1944, Khallikote College started degree classes in Arts, Science and Commerce streams under Utkal University affiliation. Postgraduate programmes were introduced in four subjects in 1963. Then in 1967 this college became affiliated to Berhampur University after its establishment. The college management was handed over to Government of Odisha from 1971. The college has given autonomy since 1990 and renamed it as Khallikote Autonomous College.

=== Journey to University ===
The Khallikote Cluster University was established as the first cluster university in Odisha on 30 May 2015, under the RUSA scheme. It was started to give affiliation, resource distribution and to tackle staff crunch among age old Khallikote (Autonomous) College, Berhampur; Sashi Bhusan Rath Government Women's College, Berhampur; Binayak Acharya College, Berhampur; Government Science College, Chhatrapur; and Gopalpur College, Gopalpur. The cluster headquarter was in the Khallikote College campus. By 2021, the cluster university has ceased its operations and merged with Berhampur University.

With major amendments, Khallikote Autonomous College has been upgraded and has given the status of a new Unitary University in the state of Odisha from 1 August 2021.

== Academics ==
The university currently has twenty-two departments which are listed as follows.

=== Departments ===
- Anthropology
- BBA
- Bachelor of Education
- Botany & Biotech
- Chemistry
- Commerce
- Computer Science
- Economics
- Education
- Electronics & Telecommunications
- English
- Geology
- Hindi
- History
- MFA
- Mathematics
- Master of Computer Application
- Odia
- Philosophy
- Physics
- Political Science
- Zoology

== Facilities ==
- Central Bank of India with ATM
- Sub-Post Office
- Khallikote University Stadium

== Alumni ==
- V. V. Giri, former President of India
- Bishwanath Das, Ex-Governor
- Chief Justice Lingaraj Panigrahi
- Justice B. Jagannadha Das
- Vice Admiral S. H. Sarma
- Nityananda Pradhan
- Ladu Kishore Swain
- Sisir Mishra
- Celina Jaitly
- Tamanna Vyas
