= Lingaraj Panigrahi =

Indian Judge and politician

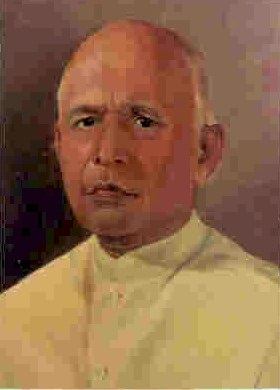

3rd Speaker of Odisha Legislative Assembly
- In office 1 July 1961 – 18 March 1967
- Deputy: Lokanath Mishra
- Preceded by: Nilakantha Das
- Succeeded by: Nandakishore Mishra

Home Minister of Odisha
- In office 6 April 1957 – 22 May 1959
- Chief Minister: Harekrushna Mahatab
- Succeeded by: Harekrushna Mahatab

Law Minister of Odisha
- In office 6 April 1957 – 22 May 1959
- Chief Minister: Harekrushna Mahatab
- Succeeded by: Rajendra Narayan Singh Deo

Education Minister of Odisha
- In office 6 April 1957 – 22 May 1959
- Chief Minister: Harekrushna Mahatab

Member of Odisha Legislative Assembly
- In office 1961–1967
- Speaker: Himself
- Preceded by: Ramchandro Mardaraj Dev
- Succeeded by: Constituency abolished
- Constituency: Kodala East
- In office 1957–1961
- Speaker: Nilakantha Das
- Preceded by: Brundaban Nayak
- Succeeded by: Sisir Kumar Narendra Deb
- Constituency: Berhampur

3rd Chief Justice of Orissa High Court
- In office 4 March 1953 – 20 March 1956
- Appointed by: Rajendra Prasad
- Preceded by: B. Jagannadha Das
- Succeeded by: R. L. Narasimham

Judge of Orissa High Court
- In office 26 July 1948 – 3 March 1953
- Appointed by: C. Rajagopalachari

2nd Advocate General of Odisha
- In office 1945–1948
- Preceded by: Bira Kishore Ray
- Succeeded by: Bichitra Nanda Das

Personal details
- Born: 21 March 1896 Ganjam, Orissa
- Died: 23 August 1969 (aged 73)
- Spouse: Swarnamoyee Panigrahi
- Children: 5 (including Pramod Panigrahi)
- Parent: Gopinath Panigrahi
- Education: Khallikote College; Ravenshaw College; Madras Presidency College; Madras Law College

Lingaraj Panigrahi (21 March 1896 - 23 August 1969) was an Indian politician and former Chief Justice of Orissa High Court. He also served as speaker of the third Odisha Legislative Assembly.

== Career ==
Panigrahi was born in Ganjam District. He initially studied in Khallikote Autonomous College, passed I.Sc. from Ravenshaw College of Cuttack and enrolled in the Presidency College, Madras. He completed his B.L. degree from Madras Law College. Panigrahi practiced at Berhampur. He became the Government Pleader in 1930. Panigrahi was appointed the Advocate General of Odisha in 1945. On 26 July 1948 he was appointed judge of Orissa High Court and in 1953 became the Chief Justice of this High Court. After his retirement in 1956 he joined the Indian National Congress and contested from the Berhampur Vidhan Sabha constituency. Panigrahi became a member of Odisha Legislative Assembly in 1952 and became the speaker of the Assembly from 1961 to 1967.

He served as cabinet minister in the cabinet of Harekrushna Mahatab, Chief Minister of Odisha, holding important portfolios like Home, Law and Education.

He is the father of Pramod Panigrahi, a former Law Secretary of Government of Odisha.
