= Siba Narain Sankar =

Indian judge (1915–?)

Chief Justice (Retd.) Siba Narain Sankar
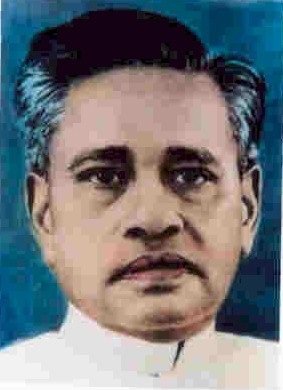

8th Chief justice of Orissa High Court
- In office 1 November 1975 – 12 October 1977
- Nominated by: A. N. Ray
- Appointed by: Fakhruddin Ali Ahmed
- Preceded by: Gati Krushna Misra
- Succeeded by: Sukanta Kishore Ray

Judge of Delhi High Court
- In office 25 May 1967 – 31 October 1975
- Nominated by: K. Subba Rao
- Appointed by: V. V. Giri (Acting President of India)

Personal details
- Born: 13 October 1915 New Delhi
- Died: Unknown
- Education: M.A. and LL.B
- Alma mater: Delhi University

Siba Narain Sankar (born 13 October 1915 – unknown) was an Indian judge who served as the 8th Chief Justice of Orissa High Court.

== Career ==
Sankar was born on 13 October 1915 in New Delhi. He completed his educational career in Delhi University and joined the Bar in 1937. In 1960 he was appointed as the Additional Counsel of Central Government and later on became the Central Government Counsel in Delhi High Court. He was also the President of the Delhi Bar Association.

He was elevated to the Bench of Delhi High Court on 25 May 1967 and became the Chief Justice of Orissa High Court from 1 November 1975 to 12 October 1977.
