= Gobind Das =

Indian lawyer and writer (1929–2008)

Gobind Chandra Das
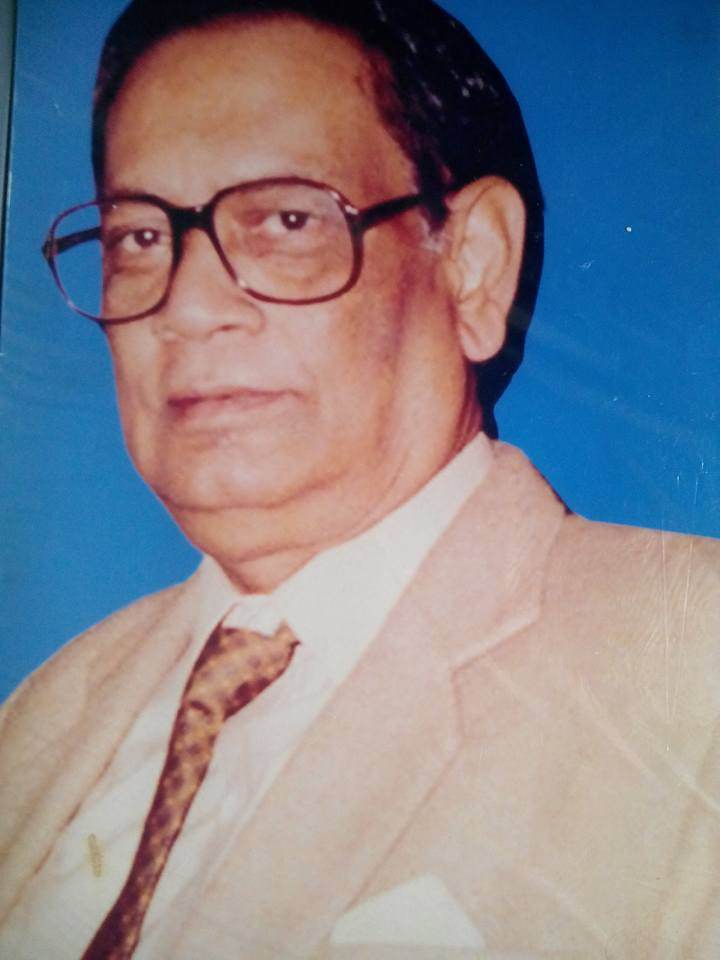

Advocate General of Odisha
- In office 1981–1983

Advocate General, Odisha
- In office 1998–1999

President, Odisha Bar Association.
- In office 3 April 2006 – 6 August 2007

Personal details
- Born: 30 June 1929 Kalyanpur Village, Jajpur District, Odisha
- Died: 17 October 2008 (aged 79)
- Spouse: Smt. Shanti Das
- Children: Jyoti Prakash Das & Mrinalini Das.
- Parent(s): Late Shri Gopal Chandra Das and Uma Devi
- Education: Lincoln's Inn, England Presidency College Kolkata Ravenshaw College, Cuttack M.S. Law College, Cuttack
- Occupation: Barrister, Writer
- Known for: Legal acumen, Literary contributions

Gobind Chandra Das (30 June 1929 – 17 October 2008) was an Indian lawyer and writer.

== Legal career ==
Das served as an Advocate General of the Odisha High Court from 10 August 1998 to 15 March 1999.

== Literary contributions ==
Das wrote extensively in Odia, his mother tongue, and authored novels, poetry, and articles. His debut novel, Amabasya Ra Chandra, achieved remarkable success and was translated into various languages, including Hindi. Some of his other notable literary works include Deshe Deshe, Jatak, Misra Raga, Bhagnansa, and his autobiography Sana Gotiye Jibana.

Das' most prominent literary works were centred around the Supreme Court, with books like Justice in India and Supreme Court in Quest Of Identity, which provided a comprehensive analysis of the Supreme Court.

== Publications ==
- Supreme Court In Quest of Identity ISBN 81-7012-690-8
- Supreme But Not Infallible ISBN 0195653793
- Amabasya Ra Chandra. ISBN 8174000879
- Deshe Deshe ISBN 81-7400-468-8
- Sana Gotie Jibana ISBN 8174004998
- Kete Katha O Kichhi Kabita |Ekatra Sankalana | ISBN 8174004289
- Justice In India.
- Misraraga ମିଶ୍ରରାଗ (Short Stories)
- Jataka - ଜାତକ (book of Poems)
- Lassu - ଲାସୁ (Novel)
- Bhagannsa ଭଗ୍ନାଂଶ (Novel)
- Surjiyasta - ସୂର୍ଯ୍ୟାସ୍ତ (Novel)
