= Satya Bhusan Burman =

Indian judge

Hon'ble Chief Justice Satya Bhusan Burman
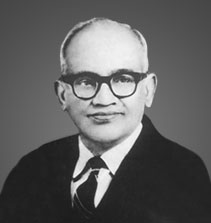

6th Chief justice of Orissa High Court
- In office 6 April 1967 – 30 April 1969
- Appointed by: S. Radhakrishnan
- Preceded by: Khaleel Ahmed
- Succeeded by: Gati Krushna Misra

Judge of Orissa High Court
- In office 3 February 1958 – 5 April 1967
- Nominated by: Sudhi Ranjan Das
- Appointed by: Rajendra Prasad
- Acting Chief Justice
- In office 28 December 1964 – 17 January 1965
- Appointed by: S. Radhakrishnan
- Preceded by: R. L. Narasimham
- Succeeded by: Khaleel Ahmed

Personal details
- Born: 1 May 1907
- Died: not known
- Education: LL.B
- Alma mater: Mitra Institution, Presidency College, Calcutta, Calcutta University

Satya Bhusan Burman (born 1 May 1907, date of death unknown) was an Indian judge and former Chief Justice of Orissa High Court.

== Career ==
Burman was born in 1907. He studied at Mitra Institution, Kolkata and Presidency College. He passed Law from Hazra Law College, University of Calcutta. Burman became Bar at Law from the Lincoln’s Inn, London. In 1932 he was called to the English Bar. Burman was appointed additional Judge of the Orissa High Court on 3 February 1958. He was elevated to bench of Orissa High Court in 1958 according to the proposal of Sudhi Ranjan Das, Chief Justice of India. In a rare precedent Burman's elevation was made from the Calcutta Bar to the Honourable Orissa High Court with recommendations supporting the proposal for the elevation to judgeship of Burman by then Chief Minister of Orissa Rajendra Narayan Singhdeo and Chief Justice of Orissa Khaleel Ahmed. He served as Acting Chief Justice of Orissa High Court after transfer of Chief Justice Ramaswamy Laxman Narasimham to Patna High Court on 27 December 1964. Justice Burman retired from the judgeship on 30 April 1969.
