= Hari Lal Agrawal =

12th Chief Justice of Orissa High Court

Justice Hari Lal Agrawal
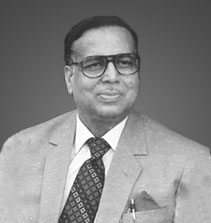

12th Chief justice of Orissa High Court
- In office 1 May 1986 – 31 July 1989
- Nominated by: P. N. Bhagwati
- Appointed by: Zail Singh
- Preceded by: Dambarudhar Pathak; B. N. Misra (acting)
- Succeeded by: Banwari Lal Hansaria; R. C. Pattnaik (acting)

Judge of Patna High Court
- In office 12 April 1973 – 30 April 1986
- Nominated by: Sarv Mittra Sikri
- Appointed by: V. V. Giri

Personal details
- Born: 1 August 1927
- Died: Not known
- Education: LL.B

Hari Lal Agrawal (born 1 August 1927) was an Indian judge and 12th chief Justice of the Orissa High Court from 1 May 1986 to 31 July 1989. He also served as judge of the Patna High Court.

== Education and career ==
Agrawal was born on 1 August 1927. He was enrolled as an advocate of the Patna High Court on 19 December 1955. He practised primarily in civil cases. On 19 May 1972, he was designated a Senior Advocate of the Patna High Court. He was appointed an Additional Judge of the Patna High Court on 12 April 1973 along with several notable judges including Bhagwati Prasad Jha, shortest serving chief justice of Patna High Court, Lalit Mohan Sharma, 24th Chief Justice of India, Shushil Kumar Jha, Chief Justice of Patna and Madhya Pradesh High Court and Nagendra Prasad Singh, former judge of Supreme Court of India. He became a permanent judge on 1 January 1974.

Agrawal was elevated as the Chief Justice of the Orissa High Court on 1 May 1986. He held the office until 31 July 1989, when he superannuated. He succeeded Justice Dambarudhar Pathak and was succeeded by Justice Banwari Lal Hansaria.
