= Harish Tandon =

35th Chief Justice of Orissa High Court

Hon'ble Chief Justice (Retd.) Harish Tandon
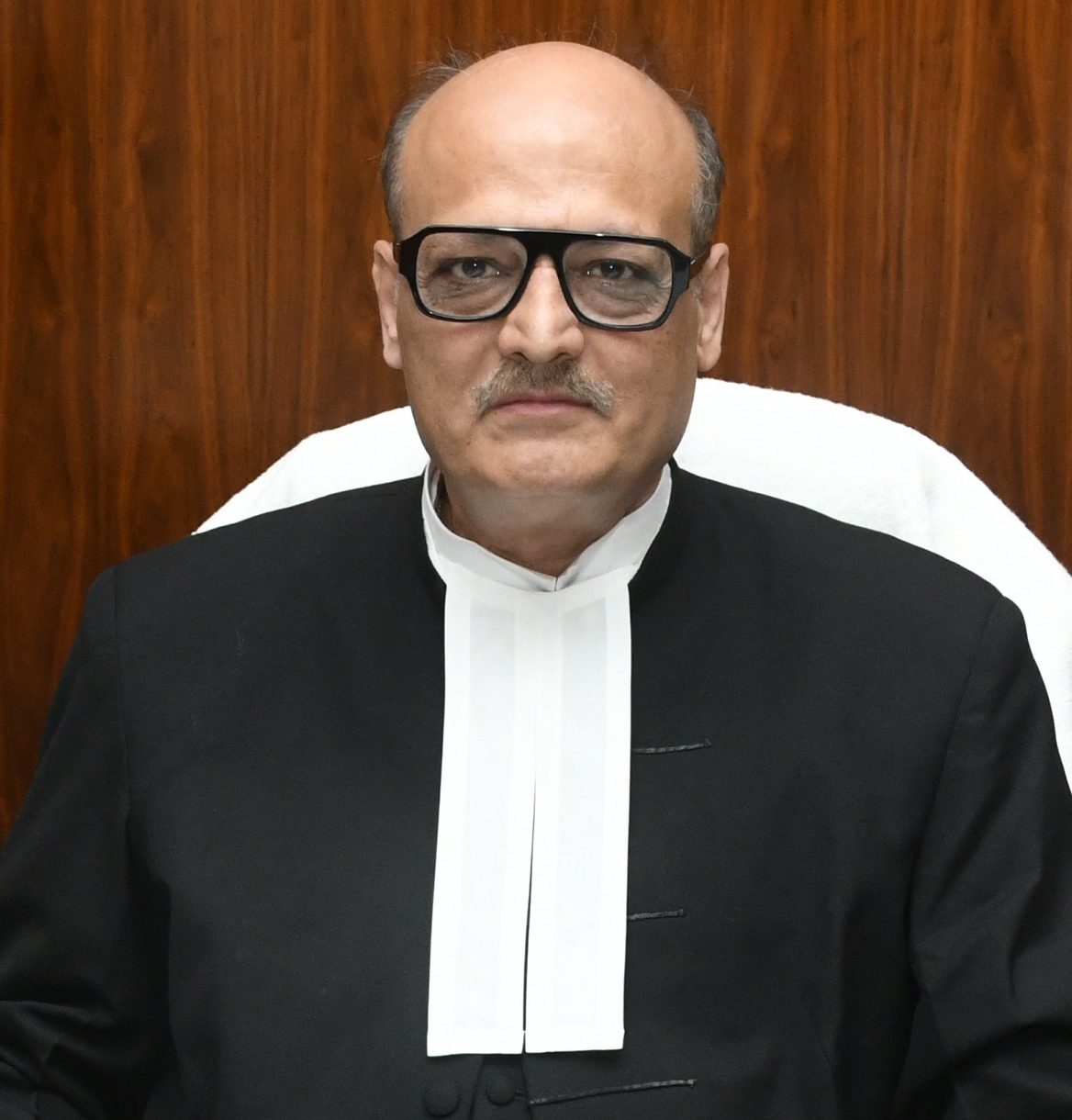

35th Chief Justice of Orissa High Court
- In office 26 March 2025 – 15 November 2026
- Nominated by: Sanjiv Khanna
- Appointed by: Droupadi Murmu
- Preceded by: C. S. Singh; Arindam Sinha (acting)
- Succeeded by: Bibhu Prasad Routray (acting)

Judge of Calcutta High Court
- In office 13 April 2010 – 25 March 2025
- Nominated by: K. G. Balakrishnan
- Appointed by: Pratibha Patil

Personal details
- Born: 16 November 1964 (age 62)
- Education: Calcutta University (LL.B)

Harish Tandon (born 16 November 1964) is a retired Indian judge, who served as the 35th Chief Justice of the Orissa High Court from 26 March 2025 to 15 November 2026. He is also a former judge of the Calcutta High Court.

== Education ==
Tandon was born on 16 November 1964. He graduated from the University of Calcutta in 1983. He completed his LL.B. from the same university in 1989. On 26 September 1989, he enrolled as an advocate and began practicing law at Calcutta High Court. During his legal practice, he primarily handled civil and appellate matters, practicing in the Calcutta High Court, city civil courts of Calcutta, Debt Recovery Tribunal and the Supreme Court of India.

== Career ==
On 13 April 2010, Tandon was appointed as permanent judge of the Calcutta High Court. He served in that high court for almost 15 years when, on 6 March 2025, Supreme Court collegium led by CJI Sanjiv Khanna recommended his name for appointment as Chief Justice of the Orissa High Court. The office had been vacant from the retirement of Chief Justice Chakradhari Sharan Singh and Justice Arindam Sinha had served as Acting Chief Justice.

Government cleared his appointment on 21 March 2025 and Justice Tandon took oath as the 35th Chief Justice of Orissa High Court on 26 March 2025. He served in that position until his retirement on 15 November 2026. Notably he was the senior most high court judge in the country when he retired.
