= Sanju Panda =

Former Judge of Orissa High Court

Hon'ble Mrs. Justice (Retd.) Sanju Panda

Judge of Orissa High Court
- In office 1 March 2007 – 9 July 2021
- Nominated by: K. G. Balakrishnan
- Appointed by: A. P. J. Abdul Kalam

Acting Chief Justice of Orissa High Court
- In office 5 January 2020 – 26 April 2020
- Appointed by: Ram Nath Kovind

Personal details
- Born: 10 July 1959 (age 66) Parlakhemundi

Ms. Justice Sanju Panda (born 10 July 1959) is a retired Indian judge. She is a former judge of Orissa High Court and also served as acting chief justice of that high court.

== Career ==
She was born on 10 July 1959 at Paralakhemundi in Odisha. She was enrolled in the Bar in 1985. She was elevated as Judge of Orissa High Court on 1 March 2007. She was appointed Acting Chief Justice of Orissa High Court on 5 January 2020 after retirement of Chief Justice Kalpesh Satyendra Jhaveri till 24 April 2020. She retired on 9 July 2021.
