= Dambarudhar Pathak =

11th Chief Justice of Orissa High Court

Chief Justice Dambarudhar Pathak
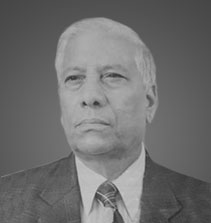

Vice Chairman of Central Administrative Tribunal
- In office 3 March 1986 – 28 February 1989
- Appointed by: Zail Singh
- Chairman: K. Madhava Reddy; Amitav Banerji

11th Chief justice of Orissa High Court
- In office 11 August 1983 – 28 February 1986
- Nominated by: Y. V. Chandrachud
- Appointed by: Zail Singh
- Preceded by: Ranganath Misra; P. K. Mohanti (acting)
- Succeeded by: Hari Lal Agrawal; B. N. Misra (acting)

14th Chief justice of Gauhati High Court
- In office 18 April 1983 – 8 August 1983
- Nominated by: Y. V. Chandrachud
- Appointed by: Zail Singh
- Preceded by: Baharul Islam
- Succeeded by: Tribeni Sahai Misra

Judge of Gauhati High Court
- In office 8 August 1973 – 17 April 1983; Acting CJ : 2 March 1980 – 17 April 1983
- Nominated by: Ajit Nath Ray
- Appointed by: V. V. Giri

Personal details
- Born: 1 March 1924
- Died: 10 August 2005 (aged 81) Guwahati, India
- Education: Calcutta University (B.A.), Gauhati University (LL.B), London University (LL.M)

Dambarudhar Pathak (1 March 1924 – 10 August 2005) was an Indian judge who served as the Chief Justice of the Odisha High Court and Gauhati High Court. He also served as judge and acting chief justice of the Gauhati High Court.

== Life and career ==
Pathak was born on 1 March 1924. He obtained B.A. degree from the Calcutta University in 1946 and LL.B. degree from the Gauhati University in 1953. In order to prosecute further studies in law, he went to United Kingdom. From London University, he obtained LL.M. degree in 1957. Prior to obtaining the post graduate degree, he became Bar at law from Lincoln’s Inn in 1956 and on completion of the advanced studies, he returned to India. He was enrolled as an Advocate in the Gauhati High Court in April 1958. From 1961, he also started to conduct cases before the Supreme Court of India.

Pathak served as a part-time law lecturer of the Law College of Gauhati University from 1958 and became the part time Principal of the said college for 3 years before his elevation to the Gauhati High Court Bench. He contributed immensely to the legal literature by writing articles and books.

== As judge ==
On 8 August 1973, Pathak was elevated to the Bench of the Gauhati High Court. On 1 March 1980, he began serving as Acting Chief Justice of the Gauhati High Court, a position he held until 17 April 1983. He was appointed Chief Justice on 18 April 1983. Pathak's tenure as Chief Justice of the Gauhati High Court was brief. On 11 August 1983, he was transferred as Chief Justice of the Orissa High Court, where he served until his retirement on 28 February 1986. He became the 11th Chief Justice of that court, succeeding Justice Ranganath Misra, who later became Chief Justice of India.

After retirement as chief justice of the Orissa High Court, Pathak was appointed as Vice Chairman of Central Administrative Tribunal for 3 years and retired in 1989.

Pathak died at his residence in Guwahati on 10 August 2005, at the age of 81.
