= Bira Kishore Ray =

Indian judge (1891 - 1958)

Hon'ble Chief Justice (Retd.) Bira Kishore Ray
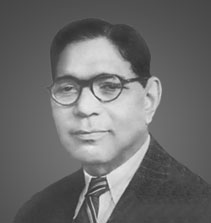

1st Chief Justice of Orissa High Court
- In office 26 July 1948 – 30 October 1951
- Appointed by: C. Rajagopalachari
- Preceded by: Position established
- Succeeded by: B. Jagannadha Das

Judge of Patna High Court
- In office 23 July 1945 – 25 July 1948
- Appointed by: Lord Wavell

1st Advocate General of Odisha
- In office 1937–1945
- Preceded by: Position established
- Succeeded by: Lingaraj Panigrahi

Personal details
- Born: 21 October 1891 Cuttack district, Bagalgarh village
- Died: 26 July 1958 (aged 66)
- Children: Sukanta Kishore Ray
- Education: Ravenshaw college, University of Calcutta

Bira Kishore Ray (21 October 1891 – 26 July 1958) was an Indian judge who was the first Chief Justice of Orissa High Court.

== Early life and career ==
Bira Kishore Ray was born on 21 October 1891 in an aristocratic landholding Karan family at Bagalgarh village of Niali, Cuttack district. He was educated in Ravenshaw college and later obtained a degree in law from the University of Calcutta.

On April 1, 1936, Orissa was made a separate province but no separate High Court was provided for it. Bira Kishore assumed the role of the first Advocate General of Orissa Province on 1 April 1937 during the tenure of Prime Minister Krushna Chandra Gajapati of Paralakhemundi. Ray's prominence at the bar positioned him as a key authority on legal matters in the province, though specific cases from his advocacy period remain sparsely documented in available records.

On July 26, 1938, the High Court Bar Association at Cuttack adopted a Resolution demanding a separate High Court for Orissa and on February 11, 1939, a Resolution was moved in the Legislative Assembly situated at Cuttack requesting the Government to constitute a committee to examine the question of establishing a separate High Court in Orissa. Following this action by the Odisha legislature a resolution was passed on August 19, 1942 by the Law Department of the Government of Odisha where Bira was made Chairman of the Orissa High Court Committee along with Rai Bahadur Chinta Mani Acharya, President of High Court Bar Association at Cuttack, Bichitrananda Das, and Advocate, D.N. Narasingha Rao Berhampur as Members and J.E. Maher, Superintendent and Remembrancer of Legal Affairs, Odisha as the Secretary during the second tenure of Prime Minister Krushna Chandra Gajapati under the Governorship of Sir Hawthorne Lewis.

Later he was elevated to the Bench of Patna High Court in 1945. He was also the first Odia to become the Judge of Patna High Court.

On July 26, 1948, Orissa High Court with Bira Kishore Ray as the Chief Justice and B. Jagannadha Das, Lingaraj Panigrahi and Ramaswamy Lakshmi Narasingham as Puisne Judges was inaugurated by H.J.Kania, the then Chief Justice of the Federal Court of India and practice of holding Circuit Court at Cuttack was discontinued. To mark the 75th anniversary of the formation of High Court of Orissa a commemorative stamp and first day cover and information brochure published by the India Post.

Bira Kishore Ray was married to Latika. He was also the editor of a short-lived English language newspaper called the Orissa Times and was associated with the Orissa state formation movement and would be a host to Pandit Jawaharlal Nehru during his visits to Cuttack.

His son Sukanta Kishore Ray also served as Chief Justice of Orissa High Court and his younger son Nikunja Kishore Ray later on became the Deputy Director of Intelligence Bureau (IB) expertising in wireless communications and intelligence expert(COMINT).

Bira Kishore Ray died on 26 July 1958, at the age of 66, coinciding precisely with the 10th foundation day of the Orissa High Court.

== Legacy ==
Ray is remembered by the legal fraternity of Odisha and his work and efforts are conserved through the Justice Bira Kishore Ray Memorial Committee and the High Court Bar Association to honor his foundational role as the court's first Chief Justice and an advocate of judicial principles including impartiality, conscience-driven decisions, fairness in justice delivery, and collaborative Bench-Bar relations for effective adjudication.These observances underscore his lasting recognition as a pioneering Odia judicial figure whose leadership shaped the institution's early ethos.
