= Chokkalingam Nagappan =

Indian judge (born 1951)

C Nagappan

Judge of the Supreme Court of India
- In office 19 September 2013 – 3 October 2016
- Appointed by: Pranab Mukherjee

25th Chief Justice of the Odisha High Court
- In office 27 February 2013 – 18 September 2013
- Preceded by: Venkate Gopala Gowda
- Succeeded by: Adarsh Kumar Goel

Personal details
- Born: 4 October 1951 (age 74) Karur, Tamil Nadu

Chokkalingam Nagappan (born 4 October 1951) is a former judge of the Supreme Court of India who served from September 2013 till his retirement in October 2016.

== Education ==
Nagappan hails from Karur in Tamil Nadu and had his initial schooling there. He did his pre-university course in St. Joseph's College, Tiruchirappalli and completed his Bachelor of Science in chemistry at Madura College, Madurai. He studied law at Madras Law College and secured third rank in the Final University Examination in April, 1974. He did his M.L. course in criminal law and secured first rank in 1977.

== Career ==
He practiced as a junior advocate under K. Parasaran, former Attorney General of India. He was a part-time professor at Madras Law College for 7 years. He was directly recruited as district and sessions judge in 1987 and worked as district and sessions judge at Cuddalore, Salem and Coimbatore. Thereafter, he worked as the special officer, Vigilance Cell, Madras High Court. He was elevated as an acting judge of the Madras High Court on 27 September 2000 and appointed a permanent judge on 20 September 2002. He was then further elevated as the Chief Justice of the Orissa High Court and sworn in on 27 February 2013. He was sworn in as a judge of the Supreme Court of India on 19 September 2013.

Nagappan, who held a relatively short tenure, retired as a judge of the Supreme Court on 3 October 2016.

== Notable decision ==
=== Aadhar ===
A three judge bench of the Supreme Court, comprising Nagappan, Jasti Chelameswar, and Sharad Arvind Bobde ratified an earlier order of the Supreme Court and clarified that no Indian citizen without an Aadhaar card can be deprived of basic services and government subsidies.
