= Khaleel Ahmed (judge) =

Indian judge

Hon'ble Chief Justice Khaleel Ahmed
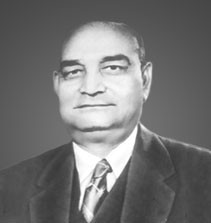

5th Chief justice of Orissa High Court
- In office 18 January 1965 – 5 April 1967
- Appointed by: S. Radhakrishnan
- Preceded by: R. L. Narasimham
- Succeeded by: Satya Bhusan Burman

Judge of Patna High Court
- In office 23 April 1951 – 17 January 1965
- Appointed by: Rajendra Prasad

Personal details
- Born: 4 April 1907 Patna
- Education: LL.B and Post Graduation in Mathematics

Khaleel Ahmed (born 4 April 1907 - death date unknown) was an Indian judge and former Chief Justice of Orissa High Court.

== Career ==
Ahmed was born as the eldest son of his parents on 4 April 1907, in Patna. He got his preliminary education from Patna High School. In the year 1928, he was enrolled for reading Law and the Post Graduation Course in Mathematics. After obtaining a law degree in 1930, he joined the profession in 1931 in District Civil Court, Patna. On 23 April 1951, he was elevated to the Bench of Patna High Court.

He also served as the Chief Justice of Orissa High Court from 18 January 1965 to 5 April 1967.
