= Arijit Pasayat =

Indian judge (born 1944)

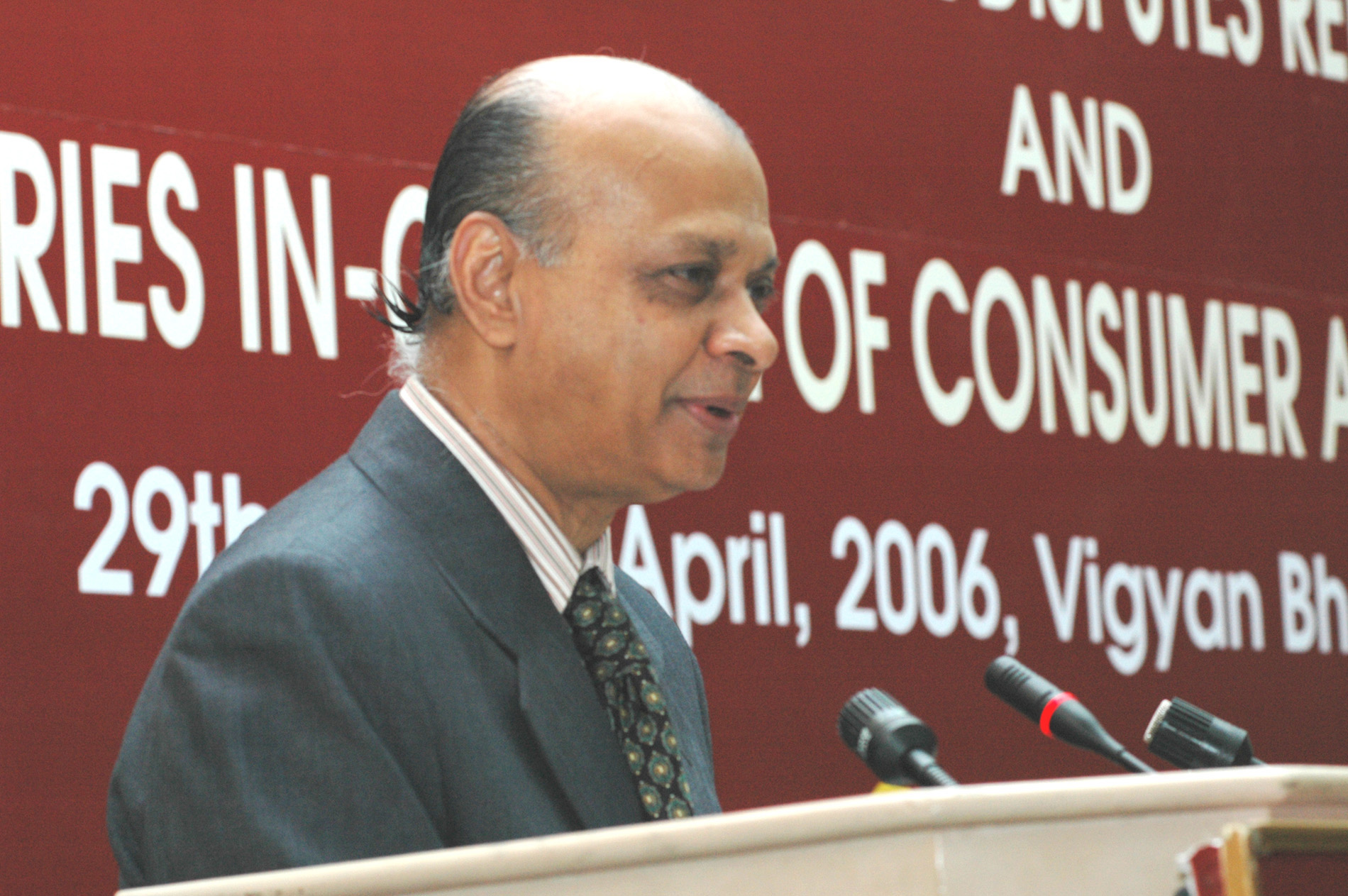

Judge of the Supreme court of India
- In office 20 October 2001 – 10 May 2009

Chief Justice of the Delhi High Court
- In office 10 May 2000 – 19 October 2001

Chief Justice of the Kerala High Court
- In office 20 September 1999 – 9 May 2000

Judge of the Orissa High Court
- In office 20 March 1989 – 19 September 1999 acting: 2 April 1999 – 18 September 1999

Personal details
- Born: 10 May 1944 (age 81)
- Parent: Viswanath Pasayat (father)

Arijit Pasayat (born 10 May 1944) is a former judge of the Supreme Court of India who served as chief justice of two High Courts of India. He hails from Orissa, where he practised in matters relating to taxation and constitutional affairs before the Orissa High Court.

== Career ==
Pasayat started his career in litigation on 10 October 1968, when he was enrolled to the bar as an advocate. In this role, he practiced before the Orissa High Court in taxation and constitutional matters while also taking up other commercial cases. He simultaneously pursued the examination of chartered accountant and completed the mandatory article-ship, and also passed the Intermediate Chartered Accountancy Examination.

He was appointed an additional judge in the Orissa High Court on 20 March 1989. He was then appointed the chief justice of the Kerala High Court on 20 September 1999. He was subsequently transferred and appointed the chief justice of Delhi High Court on 10 May 2000.

Pasayat was elevated as a judge of the Supreme Court of India on 20 October 2001, and retired on 10 May 2009.

== Prominent cases ==
Among the most notable of his decisions, he was the part of a constitutional bench of the Supreme Court which decided upon the constitutional validity of the reservation to 'other backwards classes' (OBCs) in national level institutions such as the IITs and the IIMs.

== See also ==
- Ashoka Kumar Thakur vs. Union of India (Supreme Court Case)
