= Amitava Roy =

Indian judge (born 1953)

Hon'ble Justice (Retd.) Amitava Roy

Judge of the Supreme Court of India
- In office 27 February 2015 – 1 March 2018
- Nominated by: H. L. Dattu
- Appointed by: Pranab Mukherjee

27th Chief Justice of Odisha High Court
- In office 6 August 2014 – 27 February 2015
- Nominated by: R. M. Lodha
- Appointed by: Pranab Mukherjee
- Preceded by: Adarsh Kumar Goel
- Succeeded by: Dhirendra Hiralal Waghela

31st Chief Justice of Rajasthan High Court
- In office 2 January 2013 – 5 August 2014
- Nominated by: Altamas Kabir
- Appointed by: Pranab Mukherjee
- Preceded by: Arun Kumar Mishra
- Succeeded by: Sunil Ambwani

Judge of Gauhati High Court
- In office 4 February 2002 – 1 January 2013
- Nominated by: Sam Piroj Bharucha
- Appointed by: K. R. Narayanan

Personal details
- Born: Amitava Roy; 1 March 1953 (age 73) Kolkata, West Bengal, India
- Relations: Dipankar Datta (brother-in-law)
- Education: Dibrugarh University, Dibrugarh

Amitava Roy (born 1 March 1953) is a retired judge of the Supreme Court of India and former Chief Justice of the Odisha High Court and Rajasthan High Court. He was also a puisne judge of the Gauhati High Court. he was also given judge in Sasikala da case along with Pinaki Chandra Gose which ended her cm dream.

== Elevation ==
He was elevated as the Judge of the High Court on 4 February 2002. He was administered the oath of office of the Chief Justice of Rajasthan High Court on 2 January 2013 by Margaret Alva The Governor of Rajasthan. He took oath as Supreme Court Judge, in February 2015.

== Notable Judgements ==
=== National Anthem ===
A judgement of a two judge bench of the Supreme Court of India, which included Roy and Dipak Misra, made it compulsory for cinema halls across India to play the National Anthem of India before the screening of any film, and mandated that the audience stand while the National Anthem was played. The verdict has been widely criticized for being an assault on civil liberties and individual rights in India. (Note: A report in The New York Times stated that: [The] ruling inspired sardonic commentary on social media. One person on Twitter recommended that pirated internet torrents should now come with a “national anthem file attached,” and another wrote that food vendors in cinemas should exclaim “Bharat Mata ki jai,” or “Hail Mother India,” when serving popcorn.) It was pointed out that the ruling contravened an earlier judgement of the Indian Supreme Court in which children in India claiming religious allegiance to Jehovah's Witnesses were permitted to refrain from singing the National Anthem during school assemblies in accordance with their religious rights.

Following this order, Indian police has started arresting moviegoers who fail to stand when the National Anthem is played in cinema halls in India. It has been clarified that foreigners in India are not exempt from the new law.
