= B. Jagannadha Das =

Indian judge

Hon'ble Justice (Retd.) Bachu Jagannadha Das
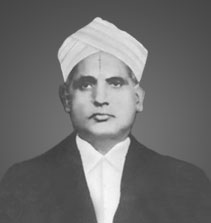

Judge of Supreme Court of India
- In office 9 March 1953 – 26 July 1958
- Nominated by: M. Patanjali Sastri
- Appointed by: Rajendra Prasad

2nd Chief Justice of Orissa High Court
- In office 31 October 1951 – 3 March 1953
- Appointed by: Rajendra Prasad
- Preceded by: Bira Kishore Ray
- Succeeded by: Lingaraj Panigrahi

Judge of Orissa High Court
- In office 26 July 1948 – 31 October 1950
- Appointed by: C. Rajagopalachari

Personal details
- Born: 27 July 1893 Berhampur, Ganjam
- Died: Not known
- Education: Khallikote College; Madras Presidency College; Madras Law College

Bachu Jagannadha Das (27 July 1893 – unknown) was the second Chief Justice of Orissa High Court and former judge of the Supreme Court of India.

== Early life and career ==
He was born on 27 July 1893 at Berhampur, Ganjam and had his early education in Berhampur. He passed Intermediate examination from the Khalikote College in the First Division in 1909 and passed from Madras Presidency College with 1st class in Mathematics in his B.A.(Honours) examination. He is a M.L. of the Madras Law College and stood first in his examination in the Presidency Law College. He is also a gold medalist of the Madras University in Hindu Law and joined Madras Bar in 1917 and had his apprenticeship under Justice Ramesam. He was a practising advocate of Madras for nearly 30 years.

Besides the legal practice in Madras High Court Jagannadha Das joined Indian National Congress in 1921. He took part in nationalist movement, social works along with Mahatma Gandhi. He was very intimately connected with various organizations of the Indian National Congress and of late Mahatma Gandhi such as Gandhi Seva Sangh, Harijan Seba Sangh, Hindi Prachar Sabha etc. He was a councilor of the Madras Corporation.

He was called to the Bar at Madras 1918 and practiced in Appellate side till 1948 with a break of 2 years (1932–34) during which interned in connection with 1942 Congress Movement. He was a Member of Bar Council Madras from 1943 to 48.

He was elevated to the Bench of Orissa High Court upon its establishment on 26 July 1948 and served as the Chief Justice of Orissa High Court from 31 October 1951 until his elevation as Judge of Supreme Court of India in 1953.
