= Gati Krushna Misra =

Indian judge

Hon'ble Chief Justice Gati Krushna Misra
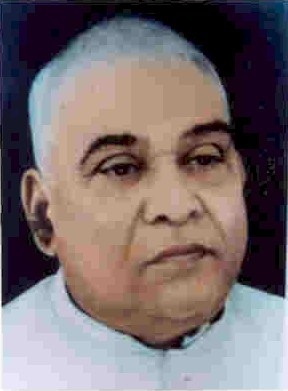

7th Chief Justice of Odisha High Court
- In office 1 May 1969 – 30 October 1975
- Appointed by: Zakir Husain
- Preceded by: Satya Bhusan Burman
- Succeeded by: Siba Narain Sankar

Judge of Odisha High Court
- In office 30 January 1962 – 30 April 1969
- Nominated by: B. P. Sinha
- Appointed by: Rajendra Prasad

Personal details
- Born: 31 October 1912 Gailo, Dhenkanal, Odisha
- Died: 6 July 2009 (aged 97) Cuttack
- Education: B.A., LL.B.
- Alma mater: Patna University

Gati Krushna Misra was an Indian judge and the seventh Chief Justice of Orissa High Court, from 1 May 1969 to 30 October 1975. On 1 May 1969, he was appointed Chief Justice of Orissa High Court and worked as such for more than six years.

== Professional life ==
Born in the village of Gailo, in Dhenkanal district, he completed his primary education in the native village. In 1937, he got a Post Graduate Degree in Economics from Patna University and pursued his law course in Patna. He returned to Odisha and pursued his Law profession in 1940 in Cuttack. He was appointed Munsif in the Orissa Judiciary in 1940. He was promoted to the cadre of Sub Judge and served at various places of Odisha. But in 1950 he resigned from Government service and joined his profession. About twelve years thereafter, i.e. from 30 January 1962 he was elevated as an additional Judge of the Odisha High Court. From 1 May 1969 to 30 October 1975 he served as the Chief Justice of Orissa High Court.

While as Chief Justice, he served as the acting Governor of Odisha from 1 July 1972 to 8 November 1972 and from 21 August 1974 to 25 October 1974.

He died on 6 July 2009. He is survived by three sons and three daughters.
