= Dhirendra Hiralal Waghela =

Indian judge (born 1954)

Justice Dhirendra Hiralal Waghela

Chief Justice of Bombay High Court
- In office 15 February 2016 – 10 August 2016

28th Chief Justice of Odisha High Court
- In office 13 April 2015 – 14 February 2016
- Preceded by: Amitava Roy
- Succeeded by: Vineet Saran

Chief Justice of Karnataka High Court
- In office March 2013 – 12 April 2015
- Preceded by: K Shridhar Rao
- Succeeded by: Subhro Kamal Mukherjee (A)

Personal details
- Born: Dhirendra Hiralal Waghela; 11 August 1954 (age 72) Rajkot, Gujarat, India
- Education: Saurashtra University

Dhirendra Hiralal Waghela (born 11 August 1954) is a retired Indian judge and a former Chief Justice of three high courts of India: Bombay, Odisha and Karnataka.

== Education and legal practice ==
Waghela stood first from Saurashtra University in General LL.B. as well as in Special LL.B. in 1974 and 1975, respectively. He took his master's degree in law in 1976–77.
