= Sukanta Kishore Ray =

Indian jurist and intellectual (1918-2002)

Hon'ble Chief Justice (Retd.) Sukanta Kishore Ray
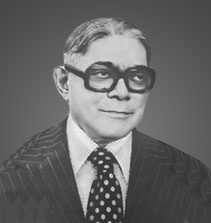

Lokpal of Odisha
- In office 17 August 1989 – 16 July 1992
- Appointed by: Saiyid Nurul Hasan
- Preceded by: Balakrishna Patro
- Succeeded by: Krushna Prasad Mohapatra

9th Chief Justice of Orissa High Court
- In office 13 October 1977 – 4 November 1980
- Nominated by: M. H. Beg
- Appointed by: Neelam Sanjiva Reddy
- Preceded by: Siba Narain Sankar
- Succeeded by: Ranganath Mishra

Judge of Orissa High Court
- In office 25 October 1967 – 12 October 1977
- Nominated by: K. N. Wanchoo
- Appointed by: Zakir Husain

Personal details
- Born: 5 November 1918 Cuttack, Odisha
- Died: 23 December 2002 (aged 84)
- Parent(s): Bira Kishore Ray (father); Latika Ray (mother)
- Education: M. A. and LL.B
- Alma mater: Ravenshaw College, Patna College

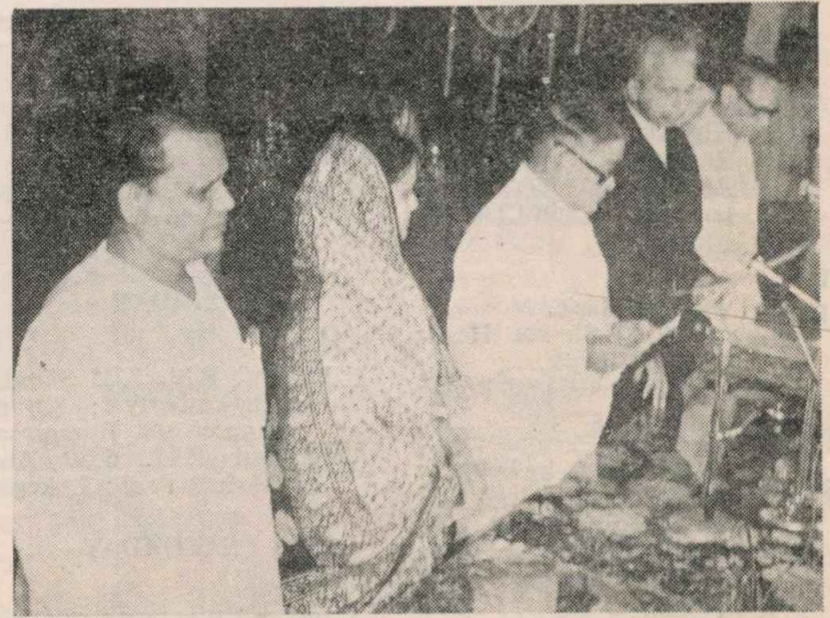
Sukanta Kishore Ray seen here along with Chief Minister Janaki Ballav Patnaik during the swearing in ceremony as Governor of Odisha State.

Sukanta Kishore Ray (5 November 1918 – 23 December 2002) was an Indian jurist and intellectual. He served as the Chief Justice of Odisha High Court and briefly also as acting Governor of Odisha. He was the 2nd Lokpal of Odisha from 17 August 1989 to 16 July 1992.

== Personal life ==
He was born on 5 November 1918 in an aristocratic landholding Karan family from Bagalgarh,Niali situated in the district of Cuttack. His father Bira Kishore Ray was the first Chief Justice of the Orissa High Court. Sukanta Kishore Ray died on 23 December 2002, at the age of 84.

Married to Ujjalamani Ray with whom Sukanta had five children as follows Anusuya Ray nee Mohanty, Anuradha Ray, Prasanta Kishore Ray, Prabhudha Kishore Ray & Amita Ray nee Raut.

== Education ==
Ray was educated first at Victoria High School (now known as Bhaktamadhu Bidyapitha), Cuttack and later on at the prestigious Ravenshaw Collegiate School. After Matriculation in the year 1932, he completed his Intermediate course in Science at Ravenshaw College where after he changed over to Arts and got his degree in Arts from Patna College where he completed his Post Graduation course also in 1942.

== Career ==
He was a Member of the Orissa High Court Bar Association and enrolled as an Advocate in the year 1943 and started his practice in the Circuit Court of Patna High Court at Cuttack. Elevated to the Bench of Orissa High Court on 25 October 1967

He is also credited to have created the Judgeship of the District Court at Khurda during his tenure as Chief Justice of Odisha serving the regions of Khurda, Banpur, Jatni and Tangi.
