= Adarsh Kumar Goel =

Indian judge (born 1953)

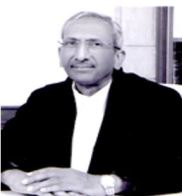

Chairperson of National Green Tribunal
- In office 6 July 2018 – 6 July 2023
- Appointed by: Pranab Mukherjee
- Succeeded by: Sheo Kumar Singh (acting)

Judge of Supreme Court of India
- In office 7 July 2014 – 6 July 2018
- Nominated by: Rajendra Mal Lodha
- Appointed by: Pranab Mukherjee

26th Chief Justice of the Odisha High Court
- In office 11 October 2013 – 6 July 2014
- Nominated by: P. Sathasivam
- Appointed by: Pranab Mukherjee
- Preceded by: Chokkalingam Nagappan
- Succeeded by: Amitava Roy

Chief Justice of the Gauhati High Court
- In office 20 December 2011 – 10 October 2013
- Nominated by: S. H. Kapadia
- Appointed by: Pratibha Patil

Judge of the Gauhati High Court
- In office 12 September 2011 – 19 December 2011
- Nominated by: S. H. Kapadia
- Appointed by: Pratibha Patil

Judge of the Punjab and Haryana High Court
- In office 2 July 2001 – 11 September 2011
- Nominated by: Adarsh Sein Anand
- Appointed by: Kocheril Raman Narayanan

Personal details
- Born: 7 July 1953 (age 73) Hisar, Haryana
- Education: Panjab University

Adarsh Kumar Goel (born 7 July 1953) is a retired Indian judge. He is a former Chairperson of National Green Tribunal, and a former judge of the Supreme Court of India. He is also former chief justice of the Orissa High Court and Gauhati High Court, and a former judge of the Gauhati High Court and Punjab and Haryana High Court.

== Career ==
Adarsh Kumar Goel received a Bachelor of Arts (Hons.) and Bachelor of Laws from Panjab University. He was enrolled as an advocate with the Bar Council of Punjab and Haryana on 16 July 1974. He practised before the High Court of Punjab and Haryana for about five years and before the Supreme Court of India and Delhi High Court for about 22 years. He was designated as senior advocate by the Supreme Court on 11 February 1999. He was elevated as judge of the Punjab and Haryana High Court on 2 July 2001. Goel was appointed executive chairman of the Haryana State Legal Services Authority on 17 May 2005. He was the acting chief justice of the Punjab and Haryana High Court from 2 May 2011 until he joined as the senior most judge of the Gauhati High Court on 12 September 2011. Thereafter, he was sworn in as chief justice of the Gauhati High Court on 20 December 2011. He was then sworn in as chief justice of the Odisha High Court on 12 October 2013. Justice Goel was elevated as a judge of Supreme Court and assumed office on 7 July 2014. Thereafter, he was appointed the Chairperson of the National Green Tribunal, New Delhi.

== Notable judgments ==
In Pradyuman Bisht vs. Union of India & Ors. case of installation of CCTV cameras in Courts, Tribunals, the Bench headed by Goel and Lalit held that by installation of CCTV cameras the objective of transparent judicial system can be achieved.

Goel initiated the idea of usage of technology in matrimonial dispute. In Krishna Veni Nigam vs. Harish Nigam, the bench was of the opinion that, “tools like video conferencing should be used in matrimonial cases where the place of adjudication is not convenient to either of the parties.” The bench further said that, "it may be appropriate that available technology of video conferencing is used where both the parties have equal difficulty and there is no place which is convenient to both the parties."

Goel's judgment on prevention of misuse of SC/ST Act in Dr. Shubhash Kashinath Mahajan vs. The State of Maharashtra, is one of the much talked about decisions. Goel along with Lalit examined the question on the inclusion of procedural safeguards so that the provisions of Scheduled Castes and the Scheduled Tribes (Prevention of Atrocities) (SC/ST) Act 1989 are not abused for extraneous considerations. The Bench held that, a Government official cannot be prosecuted on mere allegation of committing an offence under the Act without the sanction of appointing authority.

Thereafter, to cut down the backlog of cases, Goel had given a specific deadline for dealing with cases of bail application and two years time for disposing of cases dealing with serious crime. The bench in Krishnakant Tamrakar vs. The State of M.P. asked “all high courts to issue directions to subordinate courts that all bail applications should normally be disposed of by judicial officers within one week. Magisterial trials, where accused are in custody, be normally concluded within six months and sessions trials where accused are in custody be normally concluded within two years.

Goel in the judgment in Rajesh Sharma & Ors. vs. State of U.P. & Anr., also set forth new guidelines to prevent misuse of S.498A of IPC. While giving the guidelines, he observed that, “It is a matter of serious concern that large number of cases continues to be filed under Section 498A alleging harassment of married women. To remedy the situation, we are of the view that involvement of civil society in the aid of administration of justice can be one of the steps, apart from the investigating officers and the concerned trial courts being sensitized. It is also necessary to facilitate closure of proceedings where a genuine settlement has been reached instead of parties being required to move High Court only for that purpose”.

With a view to achieve a progressive step, Goel in his judgment in Amardeep Singh vs. Harveen Kaur, held that, “the 6 months waiting period prescribed under Section 13B(2) of Hindu Marriage Act for divorce by mutual consent is not mandatory, and can be waived under certain circumstances.

Further, in B. Sunitha vs. The State of Telangana he also gave his opinion and asked the government to take cognizance on the issue of introducing requisite legislative changes for a regulatory mechanism to check violation of professional ethics by Lawyers.

== Chairperson of National Green Tribunal ==
Goel was appointed Chairperson of the National Green Tribunal on 6 July 2018. At the time of his appointment, a large number of cases were pending before the Principal Bench as well as the tribunal's zonal benches. During his tenure, all benches became operational through the use of video conferencing, enabling matters to be heard from the Bhopal, Chennai, Kolkata and Pune benches.
