= Arindam Sinha =

Indian judge (born 1965)

The Honourable Justice Arindam Sinha

Judge of Allahabad High Court
- Incumbent
- Assumed office 7 April 2025
- Nominated by: Sanjiv Khanna
- Appointed by: Droupadi Murmu

Judge of Orissa High Court
- In office 8 October 2021 – 6 April 2025; Acting CJ: 20 January 2025 – 25 March 2025
- Nominated by: N. V. Ramana
- Appointed by: Ram Nath Kovind

Judge of Calcutta High Court
- In office 30 October 2013 – 7 October 2021
- Nominated by: P. Sathasivam
- Appointed by: Pranab Mukherjee

Personal details
- Born: September 22, 1965 (age 60)

Arindam Sinha (born on 22 September 1965) is an Indian judge, who is currently serving on the Allahabad High Court, in the state of Uttar Pradesh. He is also a former judge of the high courts of Calcutta and Orissa, and has also served as the Acting Chief Justice of the latter high court.

== Early life ==
He was born on 22 September 1965. He enrolled as an advocate on 11 March 1991. He practised mainly before Calcutta High Court for 22 years.

He was elevated as Additional Judge of the Calcutta High Court on 30 October 2013 and was appointed as permanent Judge on 14 March 2016.

He was transferred and took oath as Judge of the High Court of Orissa on 8 October 2021 where he also served as Acting Chief Justice consequent upon the retirement of the then Chief Justice Chakradhari Sharan Singh on 19 January 2025. Collegium proposed his transfer to Allahabad High Court on 20 March 2025. Subsequently the central government notified his transfer and he was transferred to Allahabad High Court.
