= Braja Nath Misra =

Indian judge (1930–2018)

Hon'ble Chief Justice (Retd.) Braja Nath Misra
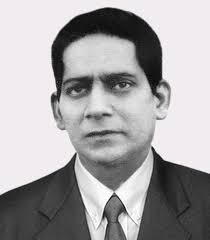

4th Chief Justice of Sikkim High Court
- In office 20 January 1990 – 8 November 1992
- Nominated by: Sabyasachi Mukharji
- Appointed by: R. Venkataraman
- Preceded by: Jugal Kishore Mohanty; Repusudan Dayal (acting)
- Succeeded by: Surendra Nath Bhargava; Repusudan Dayal (acting)

Judge of Allahabad High Court
- In office 10 July 1986 – 19 January 1990
- Nominated by: P. N. Bhagwati
- Appointed by: Zail Singh

Judge of Orissa High Court
- In office 5 January 1981 – 9 July 1986
- Nominated by: Y. V. Chandrachud
- Appointed by: Neelam Sanjiva Reddy
- Acting Chief Justice
- In office 1 March 1986 – 30 April 1986
- Appointed by: Zail Singh
- Preceded by: Dambarudhar Pathak
- Succeeded by: Hari Lal Agrawal

Personal details
- Born: 9 November 1930 Darbhanga, Bihar
- Died: 6 October 2018 (aged 87) Bengaluru, Karnataka
- Children: 5 daughters
- Education: B.Sc, LL.B, LL.M and Ph.D
- Alma mater: University of London

Braja Nath Misra (9 November 1930 – 6 October 2018) was an Indian jurist and academician who served as the Chief Justice of the Sikkim High Court, from 1990 to 1992. He also served as judge in the Orissa and Allahabad High Court.

== Personal life ==
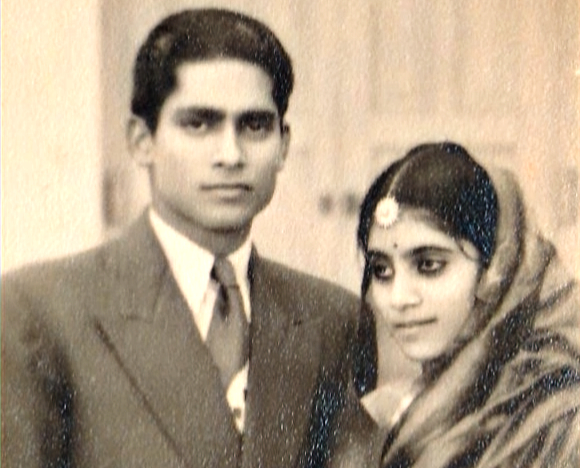
Braja with his wife Pramila

Misra was born on 9 November 1930, at Darbhanga, Bihar to Kasi Nath Misra, Rai Bahadur Civil Surgeon and the First Principal of SCB Medical College, Cuttack, Orissa. He was married to Pramila Misra, the eldest daughter of Radha Nath Misra, FRCS, and the Founder Principal of Burla Medical College. He died on 6 October 2018 and was survived by his widow and five daughters.

== Education and career ==
On 11 August 1952, he was enrolled as an Advocate of the Orissa High Court. Around 1956, he began teaching as a part-time lecturer at Madhusudan Law University, continuing for three years. A governmental decision to appoint another candidate for the role of Government Standing Counsel, allegedly due to political affiliation, served as a turning point and this prompted his decision to leave India for England to pursue higher legal education and practice.

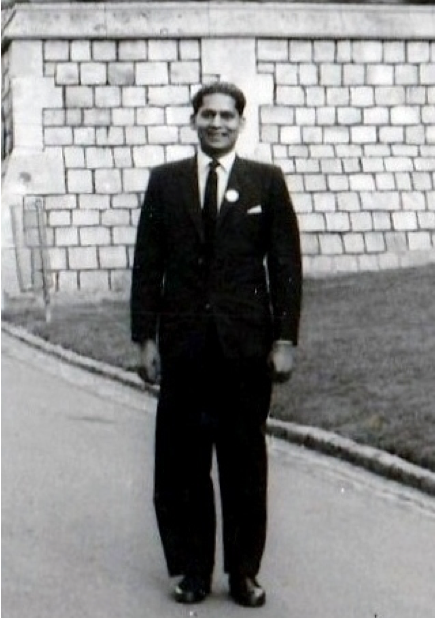

Misra gained legal qualification in England, drawing inspiration from figures like Mahatma Gandhi and Jawaharlal Nehru, who had signed the Roll of Barristers at the Inner Temple. He joined the Inner Temple, one of the four Inns of Court, and was called to the Bar. He subsequently started practice in the chambers of Mr. S. P. Khambatta, Queen's Counsel, at Temple Gardens. While practicing, he continued his studies at London University and he successfully graduated in October 1962, specializing in Constitutional Laws (I), Laws of International Institutions, Laws of Mortgages and Charities, and Laws of Landlord and Tenant. At University College, he pursued his Ph.D. in Constitutional Law. Both his LL.M. and Ph.D. degrees were presented to him at The Royal Albert Hall on May 8, 1963, by Her Majesty Queen Elizabeth The Queen Mother, the Chancellor of the University of London.

== Judicial career ==
In 1966, he returned to India and was appointed as Additional District and Sessions Judge on 31 July 1968. Also worked as Superintendent and Legal Remembrancer and ex-Officio Additional Secretary to Govt. of Orissa, Law Department from 18 May 1970 to 21 April 1972 and was appointed as District and Sessions Judge from 1 May 1972 to 25 July 1975. He was appointed as Secretary to the Government of Orissa, Law Department from 23 June 1977 to 31 August 1979 and again as District and Sessions Judge from 10 September 1979 to 14 May 1980. Also worked as Administrator of Berhampur University since 14 May 1980.

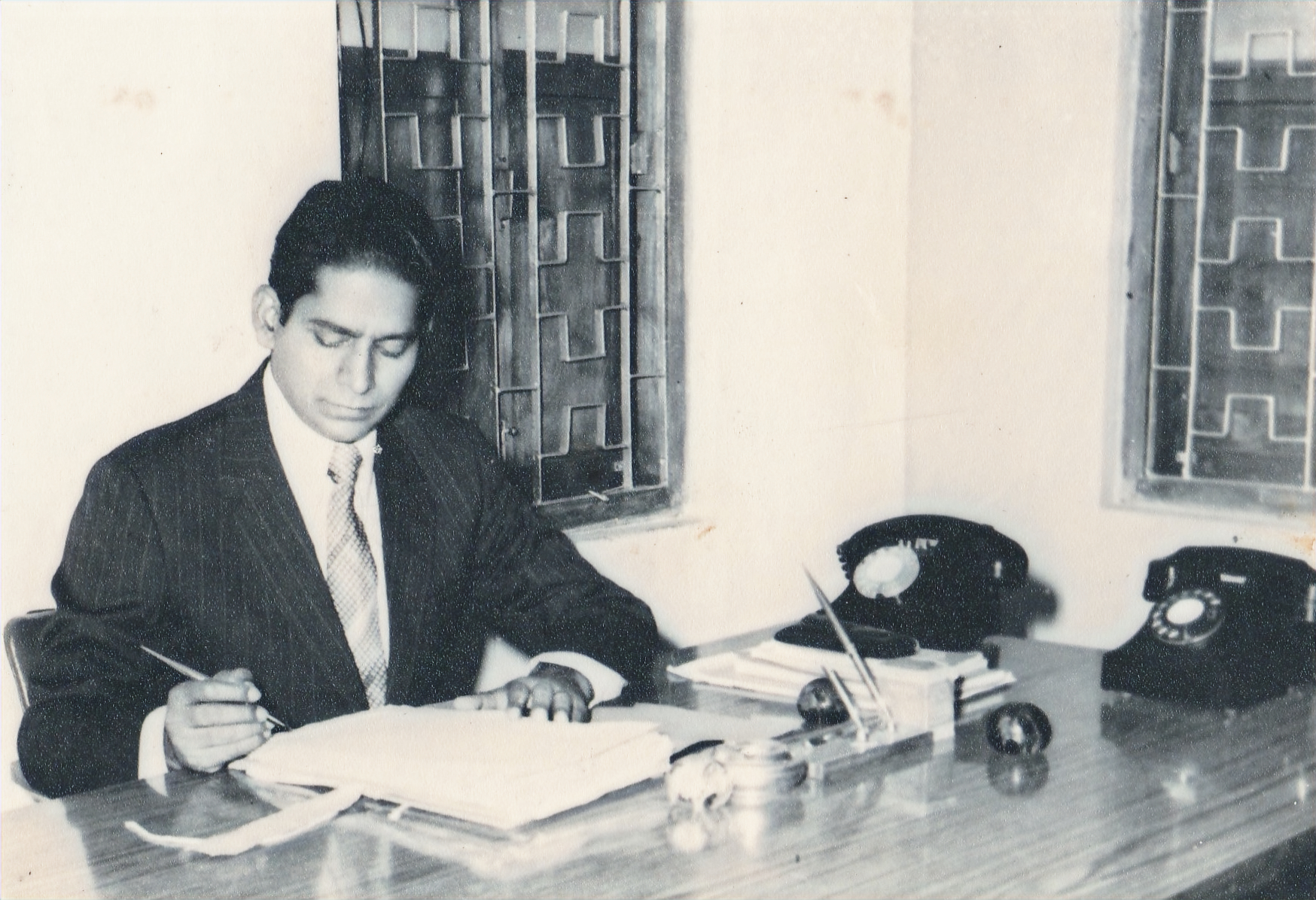

He was appointed as judge of Orissa High Court on 5 January 1981 and became its acting chief justice when the then chief justice Dambarudhar Pathak retired on 1 March 1986 and served as such till appointment of Hari Lal Agrawal as permanent chief justice on 1 May 1986.

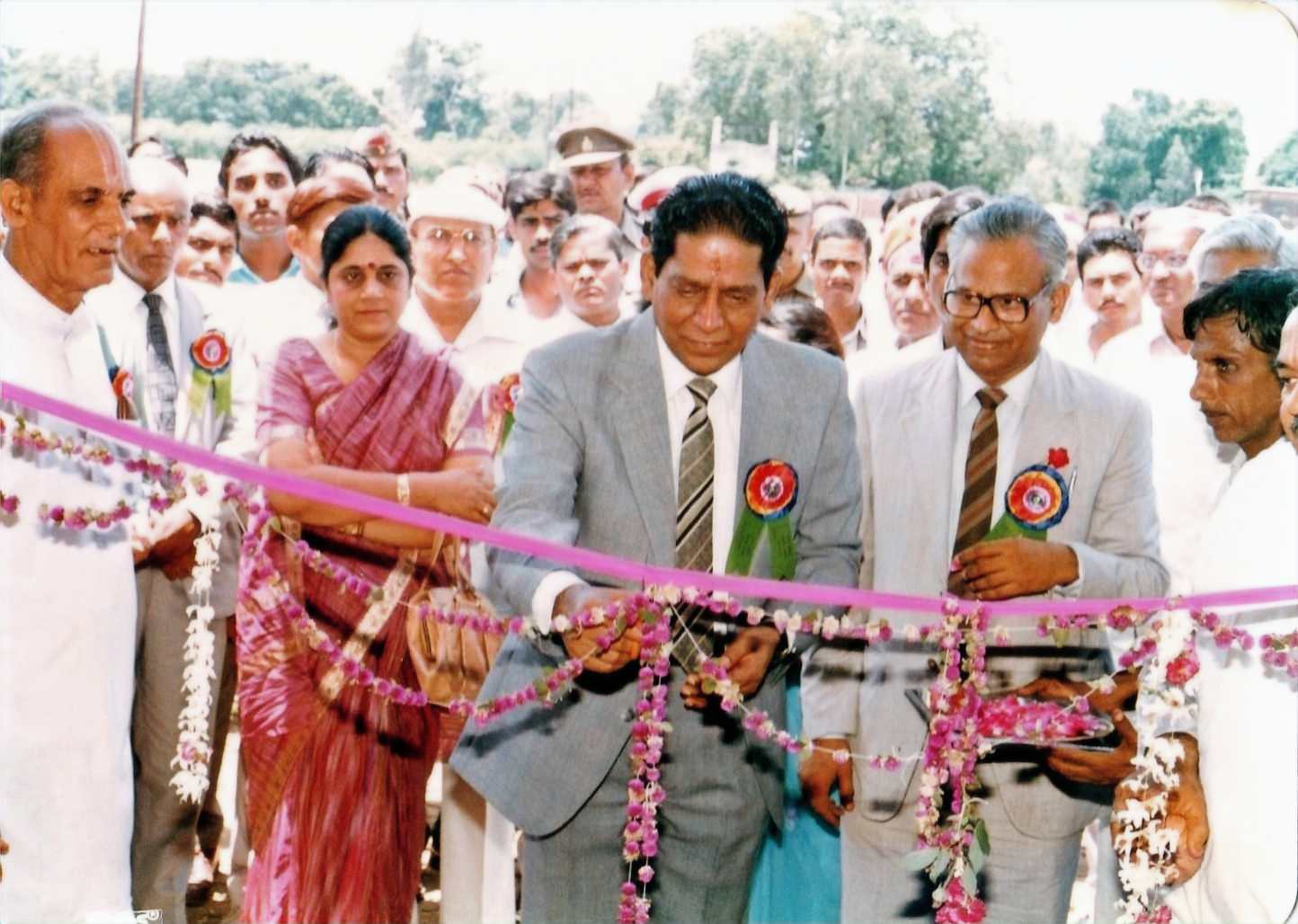

In July 1986 he was transferred to Allahabad High Court and finally elevated as chief justice of Sikkim High Court on 20 January 1990 and served as such till his retirement on 8 November 1992.

== Research and publications ==
Dr. Misra's academic work reflected his deep expertise in constitutional law and comparative international law:

Ph.D. Thesis: "Legal position of aliens in the Commonwealth"

=== Articles ===
- "A Note on Liability of Shipowners in Queensland"
- "An Indemnity for the Cost of Litigation in Australia"
- Author, Casquet of Remembrance, Autobiographical

=== Reviews ===
- Review of "Introduction to the Constitution of India, 3rd edition. By Durga Das Basu..."
- Review of "Banaras Law Journal, Volume 1, No.1 1965..."

=== Addresses and papers ===
- "The salient features of the Indian Constitution with special references to a few important amendments," Cuttack Law Times, 1976.
- "Confessions before the police," for a seminar on criminal law and contemporary social changes organized by the CBI, New Delhi, 1969.
