= Venkate Gopala Gowda =

Indian judge (born 1951)

Venkate Gowda Gopala Gowda

Judge of the Supreme Court of India
- In office 24 December 2012 – 5 October 2016

24th Chief Justice of the Odisha High Court
- In office 25 March 2010 – 24 December 2012
- Preceded by: Bilal Nazki
- Succeeded by: Chokkalingam Nagappan

Personal details
- Born: 6 October 1951 (age 74) Peddur, Chintamani, Kolar, Mysore State, India (now in Chikkaballapur, Karnataka)
- Education: Sri Jagadguru Renukacharya Law College, Bangalore

Venkate Gowda Gopala Gowda (born 6 October 1951) is a retired judge of the Supreme Court of India, serving from 2012 to 2016. He previously served as chief justice of the Orissa High Court from 2010 to 2012, and as judge of Karnataka High Court from June 1997 to March 2010.
