= Vineet Saran =

Indian judge (born 1957)

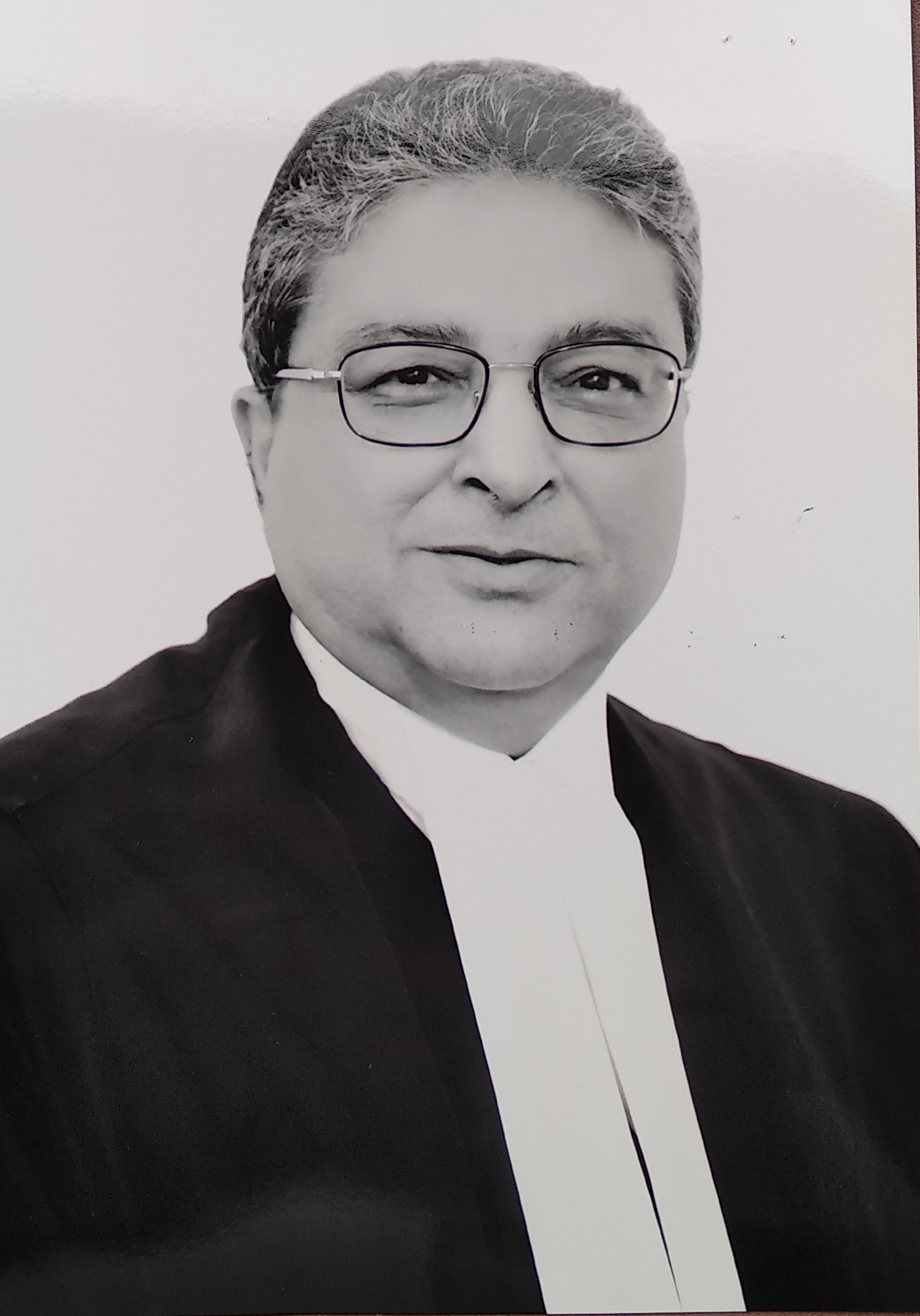

Judge of the Supreme Court of India
- In office 7 August 2018 – 10 May 2022
- Nominated by: Dipak Misra
- Appointed by: Ram Nath Kovind

29th Chief Justice of the Orissa High Court
- In office 26 February 2016 – 6 August 2018
- Nominated by: T. S. Thakur
- Appointed by: Pranab Mukherjee
- Preceded by: Dhirendra Hiralal Waghela
- Succeeded by: Kalpesh Satyendra Jhaveri

Judge of the Karnataka High Court
- In office 16 February 2015 – 25 February 2016
- Nominated by: H. L. Dattu
- Appointed by: Pranab Mukherjee

Judge of the Allahabad High Court
- In office 14 February 2002 – 15 February 2015
- Nominated by: Sam Piroj Bharucha
- Appointed by: Kocheril Raman Narayanan

Personal details
- Born: 11 May 1957 (age 69)
- Education: Allahabad University

Vineet Saran (born 11 May 1957) is a former judge of the Supreme Court of India and the ethics officer and ombudsman in the Board of Control for Cricket in India. He is a former chief justice of the Orissa High Court. He is also a former judge of the Karnataka High Court and Allahabad High Court.

== Career ==
Vineet Saran was born on 11 May 1957. He was enrolled as an advocate on 28 July 1980. He practiced before the Allahabad High Court in all matters. He was appointed a permanent judge of the Allahabad High Court on 14 February 2002. He was thereafter transferred to the Karnataka High Court on 16 February 2015 and was appointed chief justice of the Orissa High Court on 26 February 2016.

He was appointed as a judge of the Supreme Court of India on 7 August 2018. He retired on 10 May 2022.

In July 2022, he was reported as having been appointed as the BCCI ombudsman and ethics officer, in a position that had been vacant for over a year since the end of Justice (retired) DK Jain’s tenure ended in June 2021.
