= Chakradhari Sharan Singh =

Chief Justice of Orissa High Court

Hon'ble Chief Justice (Retd.) Chakradhari Sharan Singh

34th Chief Justice of Orissa High Court
- In office 7 February 2024 – 19 January 2025
- Nominated by: Dhananjaya Y. Chandrachud
- Appointed by: Droupadi Murmu
- Preceded by: Subhasis Talapatra
- Succeeded by: Harish Tandon; Arindam Sinha (acting)

Judge of Patna High Court
- In office 5 April 2012 – 6 February 2024; Acting CJ: 6 February 2023 – 28 March 2023
- Nominated by: S. H. Kapadia
- Appointed by: Pratibha Patil

Personal details
- Born: 20 January 1963 (age 63)
- Education: University of Delhi

Chakradhari Sharan Singh (born 20 January 1963) is an Indian former judge, who served as the Chief Justice of Orissa High Court and as acting Chief Justice of Patna High Court.

== Career ==
He obtained his LL.B. Degree from Campus Law Centre, University of Delhi. He was enrolled as an Advocate on 30 October 1990. He was appointed as Additional Standing Counsel, Central Government in 1998 and continued as such up to 2001. He practiced in service, constitutional and criminal matters and dealt with cases under Labour Laws and Customs. He was appointed as panel counsel by Comptroller and Auditor General of India for conducting cases on behalf of Accountant General Office in Patna High Court. On 18 September 2010, he was designated as Senior Advocate. He was appointed as Additional Advocate General, Government of Bihar in the year 2010. He was elevated as an Additional Judge of Patna High Court on 5 April 2012. He was appointed as a permanent judge of the Patna High Court on 2 March 2016. He served as Acting Chief Justice of Patna High Court from 6 February 2023 till 28 March 2023. He was patron-in-chief of Bihar State Legal Services Authority from 6 February 2023 to 28 March 2023. He held the position of patron-in-chief of Bihar Judicial Academy and Bihar State Legal Services Authority from 6 February 2023 to 28 March 2023. He then served as Executive Chairman, Bihar State Legal Services Authority from 29 March 2023 to 6 February 2024.

He was appointed as Chief Justice of Orissa High Court on 7 February 2024. He then served as the patron-in-chief of the Odisha Judicial Academy and the Odisha State Legal Services Authority.

He retired on 19 January 2025.
