= Ramaswamy Laxman Narasimham =

Former Chief Justice of Orissa and Patna High Courts

Hon'ble Chief Justice (Retd.) Ramaswamy Laxman Narasimham
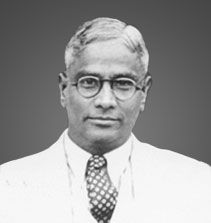

13th Chief Justice of Patna High Court
- In office 4 January 1965 – 2 August 1968
- Nominated by: P. B. Gajendragadkar
- Appointed by: S. Radhakrishnan
- Preceded by: Vaidyanathier Ramaswami
- Succeeded by: Satish Chandra Mishra

4th Chief Justice of Orissa High Court
- In office 21 March 1956 – 3 January 1965
- Nominated by: Sudhi Ranjan Das
- Appointed by: Rajendra Prasad
- Preceded by: Lingaraj Panigrahi
- Succeeded by: Khaleel Ahmed

Judge of Orissa High Court
- In office 26 July 1948 – 20 March 1956
- Appointed by: C. Rajagopalachari

Personal details
- Born: 3 August 1906
- Education: M. A.
- Alma mater: Madras University

Ramaswamy Laxman Narasimham (R.L. Narasimham) was an Indian judge and former chief justice of the Orissa High Court and Patna High Court.

== Career ==
R.L. Narasimham was a member of the Indian Civil Service. Initially he was a Secretary to the Government of Orissa in the Law, Commerce and Labour Departments and Superintendent and Remembrancer of legal affairs. He passed M.A. from Madras University and possessed a diploma in economics. He joined Oxford University and came out successful in the examination. He successfully completed in the I.C.S. examination and joined that service in 1931. He was a District and Sessions Judge at Cuttack-Sambalpur before he became Secretary to the Government of Orissa. He was elevated to the Bench of Orissa High Court on 26 July 1948 and served as the Chief Justice of Orissa High Court from 22 March 1956 to 3 January 1965 and then transferred to Patna High Court.
