= Kalpesh Satyendra Jhaveri =

Former Chief Justice of Orissa High Court

Justice Kalpesh Satyendra Jhaveri

30th Chief Justice of Orissa High Court
- In office 12 August 2018 – 4 January 2020
- Nominated by: Dipak Misra
- Appointed by: Ram Nath Kovind
- Preceded by: Vineet Saran
- Succeeded by: Mohammad Rafiq

Judge of Rajasthan High Court
- In office 24 August 2016 – 11 August 2018
- Nominated by: T. S. Thakur
- Appointed by: Pranab Mukherjee

Judge of Gujarat High Court
- In office 7 March 2004 – 23 August 2016
- Nominated by: V. N. Khare
- Appointed by: A. P. J. Abdul Kalam

Personal details
- Born: 5 January 1958 (age 68) Gujarat

Kalpesh Satyendra Jhaveri (born 5 January 1958) is a retired Indian judge and former Chief Justice of Orissa High Court. He is also a former judge the High Courts of Rajasthan and Gujarat.

== Career ==
Jhaveri passed LL.B. and got enrolment on 20 January 1983. He started practice in the Gujarat High Court. In 1983 he became a member of the executive committee of Gujarat High Court Advocates' Association and elected as Joint Secretary of the Bar in 1984. He appeared before the High Court on behalf of various Statutory authorities of the Central and State Government. On 7 March 2004, Jhaveri was elevated as Judge of Gujarat High Court, he became permanent Judge on 22 June 2005. He was transferred to Rajasthan High Court on 24 August 2016 and also served as the Executive Chairman of Rajasthan State Legal Service Authority. Justice Jhaveri was appointed the Chief Justice of Orissa High Court on 12 August 2018 after Justice Vineet Saran. Governor Ganeshi Lal administered the oath of the office and secrecy to Justice Jhaveri at a ceremony organised on the premises of Orissa HC. Jhaveri was sworn in as the 30th Chief Justice of Orissa HC.

A judge of Gujarat High Court, Jhaveri succeeded Chief Justice Vineet Saran, who has been elevated to the Supreme Court. On 19 July the Supreme Court Collegium had recommended Jhaveri's name for appointment as the Chief Justice of Orissa HC and the Ministry of Law and Justice had issued a notification in this regard.

Born on 5 January 1958, Justice Jhaveri who obtained BSc and LLB degree from Gujarat University had started his career as lawyer at Gujarat HC in 1983. He was elected as Joint Secretary in 1984 and then General Secretary of Gujarat High Court Advocates’ Association in 1988.

Justice Jhaveri, who was elevated to Gujarat HC Judge on 7 March 2004, was confirmed as a permanent Judge in June 2005. He was then transferred to Rajasthan HC in August 2016.

Among others, Chief Minister Naveen Patnaik, Chief Secretary Aditya Prasad Padhi, DGP Dr R P Sharma, Advocate General Surya Prasad Mishra, DCP Akhilesvar Singh and Collector Aravinda Agarwal were present. He retired from his office on 4 January 2020 on turning the age of 62.
