= Orissa High Court =

High Court for the state of Odisha

High Court of Orissa
- ଓଡ଼ିଶା ଉଚ୍ଚ ନ୍ୟାୟାଳୟ
- Seal of the High Court of Orissa

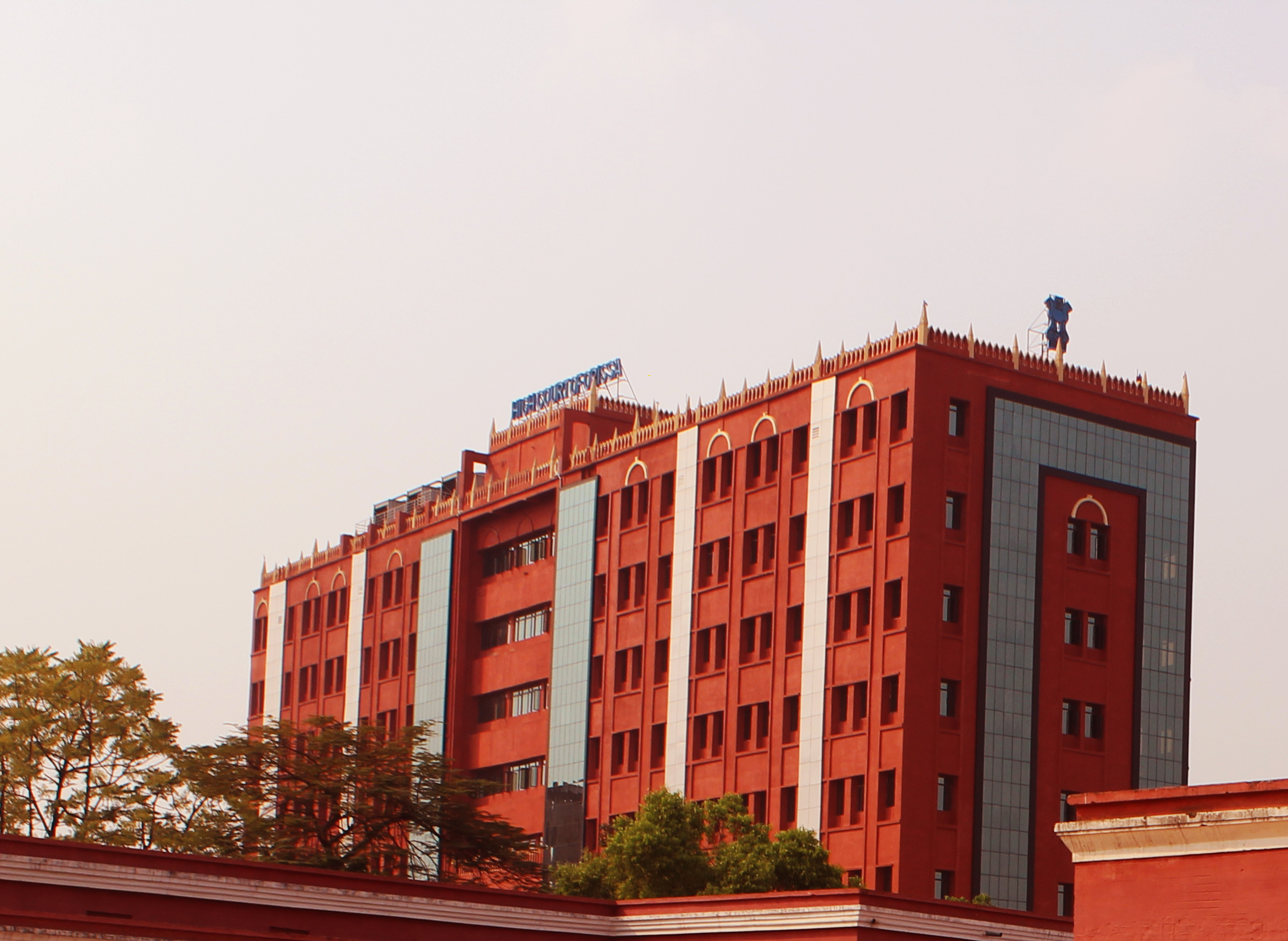
- The main building of the High Court of Orissa at Cuttack
- Interactive map of High Court of Orissa
- 20.4650°N 85.8589°E
- Established: 26 July 1948; 78 years ago
- Jurisdiction: Odisha
- Coordinates: 20.4650°N 85.8589°E
- Composition method: State High Court
- Authorised by: Article 214, Constitution of India
- Appeals to: Supreme Court of India
- Judge term length: Mandatory retirement at 62 years of age
- Number of positions: 33 (24 Permanent + 9 Additional)
- Language: English
- Website: www.orissahighcourt.nic.in

Chief Justice
- Currently: Bibhu Prasad Routray (acting)
- Since: 16 November 2026

The High Court of Orissa (commonly referred to as the Orissa High Court) is the principal High Court for the Indian state of Odisha. Established on 26 July 1948 under the Orissa High Court Order, 1948, the court is headquartered in the historic city of Cuttack. It functions as a court of record under the Constitution of India, exercising original, appellate, and writ jurisdiction over the entire territory of Odisha, as well as supervisory control over its subordinate district courts.

Before its formal establishment, the territory of Odisha was judicially administered under the jurisdiction of the Calcutta High Court following the creation of the Bihar and Orissa Province in 1912. Jurisdiction was later transferred to the Patna High Court upon its formation on 9 February 1916, which subsequently established a permanent Circuit Court at Cuttack on 18 May 1916. Following Odisha's transition into a separate province on 1 April 1936, sustained local demand led the Government of India to issue the formal creation order on 30 April 1948 under Section 229(1) of the Government of India Act 1935. The court operates with a sanctioned strength of 33 judges, consisting of 24 permanent judges and 9 additional judges.

== History ==
On 9 February 1916, in exercise of the powers under Section 113 of the Government of India Act, 1915, the King of the United Kingdom issued letters of patent constituting the High Court of Patna. Odisha was placed under the jurisdiction of Patna High Court. Although, on 18 May 1916, Circuit Court of Patna High Court for Odisha held its first sitting at Cuttack.

On 1 April 1936, Odisha was made a separate province but no separate High Court was provided for it. The Government of India agreed to create a new High Court, and for that purpose the Government of India issued the Odisha High Court Order, 1948, under the Section 229(1) of the Government of India Act, 1935, on 30 April 1948. Finally, on 26 July 1948, Odisha High Court was formally inaugurated.

The seat of the court is Cuttack. The court had a sanctioned judge strength of 27 which stood increased to 33 by the notification dated 2 February 2022.

In an innovative effort, Museum of Justice has been established at, Cuttack inside the historic compound of Barabati Fort, Cuttack.

== Chief Justice and Judges ==
Judges of the Orissa High Court
| No. | Judge | Date of birth | Date of appointment | Date of retirement |
|---|---|---|---|---|
| 1 | Justice Bibhu Prasad Routray | 1 February 1970 | 8 November 2019 | 31 January 2032 |
| 2 | Justice Sanjeeb Kumar Panigrahi | 29 July 1972 | 10 February 2020 | 28 July 2034 |
| 3 | Justice Savitri Ratho | 4 July 1968 | 11 June 2020 | 3 July 2030 |
| 4 | Justice Mruganka Sekhar Sahoo | 7 September 1971 | 19 October 2021 | 6 September 2033 |
| 5 | Justice Radha Krishna Pattanaik | 25 October 1970 | 19 October 2021 | 24 October 2032 |
| 6 | Justice Sashikanta Mishra | 17 January 1967 | 19 October 2021 | 16 January 2029 |
| 7 | Justice Aditya Kumar Mohapatra | 26 February 1969 | 5 November 2021 | 25 February 2031 |
| 8 | Justice V. Narasingh | 19 January 1967 | 14 February 2022 | 18 January 2029 |
| 9 | Justice Biraja Prasanna Satapathy | 20 August 1966 | 14 February 2022 | 19 August 2028 |
| 10 | Justice Murahari Sri Raman | 8 June 1970 | 14 February 2022 | 7 June 2032 |
| 11 | Justice Sanjay Kumar Mishra | 14 November 1967 | 10 June 2022 | 13 November 2029 |
| 12 | Justice Gourishankar Satapathy | 25 April 1972 | 13 August 2022 | 24 April 2034 |
| 13 | Justice Chittaranjan Dash | 12 November 1964 | 13 August 2022 | 11 November 2026 |
| 14 | Justice Sibo Sankar Mishra | 3 May 1968 | 5 September 2023 | 2 May 2030 |
| 15 | Justice Ananda Chandra Behera | 23 May 1964 | 5 September 2023 | 22 May 2026 |

== List of Chief Justices ==
Chief Justices of the Orissa High Court
| No. | Portrait | Chief Justice | Date of appointment | Date of retirement | Tenure | Parent High Court | Appointer (Governor) |
|---|---|---|---|---|---|---|---|
| 1 | | Justice Bira Kishore Ray | 26 July 1948 | 30 October 1951 | 3 years, 96 days | Patna High Court | Asaf Ali |
| 2 | | Justice B. Jagannadha Das | 31 October 1951 | 3 March 1953 | 1 year, 123 days | Orissa High Court | Asaf Ali |
| 3 | | Justice Lingaraj Panigrahi | 4 March 1953 | 21 March 1956 | 3 years, 17 days | Orissa High Court | Saiyid Fazl Ali |
| 4 | | Justice R. L. Narasimham | 22 March 1956 | 27 December 1964 | 8 years, 280 days | Orissa High Court | P. S. Kumaraswamy Raja |
| 5 | | Justice Khaleel Ahmed | 18 January 1965 | 5 April 1967 | 2 years, 77 days | Patna High Court | Ajudhia Nath Khosla |
| 6 | | Justice Satya Bhusan Barman | 6 April 1967 | 30 April 1969 | 2 years, 24 days | Orissa High Court | Ajudhia Nath Khosla |
| 7 | | Justice G. K. Misra | 1 May 1969 | 30 October 1975 | 6 years, 182 days | Orissa High Court | Shaukatullah Shah Ansari |
| 8 | | Justice Siba Narain Sankar | 1 November 1975 | 12 October 1977 | 1 year, 345 days | Delhi High Court | Akbar Ali Khan |
| 9 | | Justice S. K. Ray | 13 October 1977 | 4 November 1980 | 3 years, 22 days | Orissa High Court | Bhagwat Dayal Sharma |
| 10 | | Justice Ranganath Mishra | 16 January 1981 | 14 March 1983 | 2 years, 57 days | Orissa High Court | C. M. Poonacha |
| 11 | | Justice Dambarudhar Pathak | 11 August 1983 | 28 February 1986 | 2 years, 201 days | Gauhati High Court | C. M. Poonacha |
| 12 | | Justice Hari Lal Agrawal | 1 May 1986 | 31 July 1989 | 3 years, 91 days | Patna High Court | Bishambhar Nath Pande |
| 13 | | Justice B. L. Hansaria | 22 February 1990 | 13 December 1993 | 3 years, 294 days | Gauhati High Court | Yagya Dutt Sharma |
| 14 | | Justice G. T. Nanavati | 31 January 1994 | 27 September 1994 | 239 days | Gujarat High Court | B. Satya Narayan Reddy |
| 15 | | Justice V. A. Mohta | 28 September 1994 | 25 April 1995 | 209 days | Bombay High Court | B. Satya Narayan Reddy |
| 16 | | Justice S. N. Phukan | 2 August 1996 | 27 January 1999 | 2 years, 178 days | Gauhati High Court | Gopala Ramanujam |
| 17 | | Justice Biswanath Agrawal | 18 November 1999 | 18 October 2000 | 335 days | Patna High Court | M. M. Rajendran |
| 18 | | Justice N. Y. Hanumanthappa | 17 February 2001 | 24 September 2001 | 219 days | Karnataka High Court | M. M. Rajendran |
| 19 | | Justice P. K. Balasubramanyan | 5 December 2001 | 10 March 2003 | 1 year, 95 days | Kerala High Court | M. M. Rajendran |
| 20 | | Justice Sujit Barman Roy | 9 April 2003 | 21 January 2007 | 3 years, 287 days | Gauhati High Court | M. M. Rajendran |
| 21 | | Justice A. K. Ganguly | 2 March 2007 | 18 May 2008 | 1 year, 77 days | Calcutta High Court | Rameshwar Thakur |
| 22 | | Justice B. S. Chauhan | 16 July 2008 | 10 May 2009 | 298 days | Allahabad High Court | Murlidhar Chandrakant Bhandare |
| 23 | | Justice Bilal Nazki | 14 November 2009 | 17 November 2009 | 3 days | High Court of Jammu and Kashmir | Murlidhar Chandrakant Bhandare |
| 24 | | Justice V. G. Gopala Gowda | 25 March 2010 | 23 December 2012 | 2 years, 273 days | Karnataka High Court | Murlidhar Chandrakant Bhandare |
| 25 | | Justice C. Nagappan | 27 February 2013 | 18 September 2013 | 203 days | Madras High Court | Murlidhar Chandrakant Bhandare |
| 26 | | Justice A. K. Goel | 12 October 2013 | 6 July 2014 | 267 days | Punjab and Haryana High Court | S. C. Jamir |
| 27 | | Justice Amitava Roy | 6 August 2014 | 26 February 2015 | 204 days | Gauhati High Court | S. C. Jamir |
| 28 | | Justice D. H. Waghela | 4 June 2015 | 14 February 2016 | 255 days | Gujarat High Court | S. C. Jamir |
| 29 | | Justice Vineet Saran | 26 February 2016 | 6 August 2018 | 2 years, 161 days | Allahabad High Court | S. C. Jamir |
| 30 | | Justice K. S. Jhaveri | 12 August 2018 | 4 January 2020 | 1 year, 145 days | Gujarat High Court | Ganeshi Lal |
| 31 | | Justice Mohammad Rafiq | 27 April 2020 | 3 January 2021 | 251 days | Rajasthan High Court | Ganeshi Lal |
| 32 | | Justice S. Muralidhar | 4 January 2021 | 7 August 2023 | 2 years, 215 days | Delhi High Court | Ganeshi Lal |
| 33 | | Justice Subhasis Talapatra | 8 August 2023 | 3 October 2023 | 56 days | Tripura High Court | Ganeshi Lal |
| 34 | | Justice C. S. Singh | 7 February 2024 | 19 January 2025 | 347 days | Patna High Court | Raghubar Das |
| 35 | | Justice Harish Tandon | 26 March 2025 | Incumbent | 1 year, 240 days | Calcutta High Court | Kambhampati Hari Babu |

== Judges elevated as Chief Justices ==
This sections contains list of only those judges elevated as chief justices whose parent high court is Orissa. This includes those judges who, at the time of appointment as chief justice, may not be serving in Orissa High Court but this list does not include judges who at the time of appointment as chief justice were serving in Orissa High Court but does not have Orissa as their Parent High Court.

Colour Key

- Female Chief Justice
- Served as Chief Justice of India

Symbol Key

- ^{‡} Elevated to Supreme Court of India
- ^{RES} Resigned
- ^{†} Died in office

| Name | Image | Appointed as CJ in HC of | Date of appointment | | Date of retirement (Note: this includes date of resignation, death and elevation to supreme court) | Tenure | |
| Name | Image | Appointed as CJ in HC of | As Judge | As Chief Justice | Date of retirement | As Chief Justice | As Judge (Note: also includes tenure as Chief Justice) |
|---|---|---|---|---|---|---|---|
| Bachu Jagannadha Das | | Orissa | 26 July 1948 | 31 October 1951 | 3 March 1953^{[‡]} | 1 year, 124 days | 4 years, 226 days |
| Lingaraj Panigrahi | | Orissa | 26 July 1948 | 4 March 1953 | 20 March 1956 | 3 years, 17 days | 7 years, 239 days |
| Ramaswamy Laxman Narasimham | | Orissa, transferred to Patna | 26 July 1948 | 21 March 1956 | 2 August 1968 | 12 years, 135 days | 20 years, 8 days |
| Satya Bhusan Barman | | Orissa | 3 February 1958 | 6 April 1967 | 30 April 1969 | 2 years, 25 days | 11 years, 87 days |
| Gati Krushna Misra | | Orissa | 30 January 1962 | 1 May 1969 | 31 October 1975 | 6 years, 184 days | 13 years, 275 days |
| Sukanta Kishore Ray | | Orissa | 25 October 1967 | 13 October 1977 | 5 November 1980 | 3 years, 24 days | 13 years, 12 days |
| Ranganath Misra | | Orissa | 4 July 1969 | 16 January 1981 | 14 March 1983^{[‡]} | 2 years, 58 days | 13 years, 254 days |
| Jugal Kishore Mohanty | | Sikkim | 12 July 1978 | 21 January 1986 | 4 January 1989 | 2 years, 350 days | 10 years, 177 days |
| Braja Nath Misra | | Sikkim | 5 January 1981 | 20 January 1990 | 8 November 1992 | 2 years, 294 days | 11 years, 309 days |
| Gopal Ballav Pattanaik | | Patna | 1 June 1983 | 19 May 1995 | 10 September 1995^{[‡]} | 115 days | 12 years, 102 days |
| Deba Priya Mohapatra | | Allahabad | 18 November 1983 | 16 February 1996 | 8 December 1998^{[‡]} | 2 years, 296 days | 15 years, 21 days |
| Arijit Pasayat | | Kerala, transferred to Delhi | 20 March 1989 | 20 September 1999 | 18 October 2001^{[‡]} | 2 years, 29 days | 12 years, 213 days |
| Radha Krishna Patra | | Sikkim | 22 June 1992 | 9 July 2003 | 23 November 2004 | 1 year, 138 days | 12 years, 155 days |
| Ananga Kumar Patnaik | | Chhattisgarh, transferred to Madhya Pradesh | 13 January 1994 | 14 March 2005 | 16 November 2009^{[‡]} | 4 years, 248 days | 15 years, 308 days |
| Prafulla Kumar Mishra | | Patna | 17 January 1996 | 12 August 2009 | 16 September 2009 | 36 days | 13 years, 243 days |
| Dipak Misra | Dipak Misra | Patna, transferred to Delhi | 17 January 1996 | 23 December 2009 | 9 October 2011^{[‡]} | 1 year, 291 days | 15 years, 266 days |
| Laxmi Kanta Mohapatra | | Manipur | 16 January 1999 | 10 July 2014 | 9 June 2016 | 1 year, 336 days | 17 years, 146 days |
| Pradip Kumar Mohanty | | Jharkhand | 7 March 2002 | 24 March 2017 | 9 June 2017 | 78 days | 15 years, 95 days |
| Indrajit Mahanty | | Rajasthan, transferred to Tripura | 31 March 2006 | 6 October 2019 | 10 November 2022 | 3 years, 36 days | 16 years, 225 days |
| Sanjaya Kumar Mishra | | Jharkhand | 7 October 2009 | 20 February 2023 | 28 December 2023 | 312 days | 14 years, 83 days |
| Bidyut Ranjan Sarangi | | Jharkhand | 20 June 2013 | 5 July 2024 | 19 July 2024 | 15 days | 11 years, 30 days |
| Sangam Kumar Sahoo | | Patna | 2 July 2014 | 7 January 2026 | 4 June 2026 | 149 days | 11 years, 338 days |
| Krushna Ram Mohapatra | | Chhattisgarh | 17 April 2015 | 7 September 2026 | Incumbent | 76 days | 11 years, 219 days |

=== Judges appointed as Acting Chief Justice ===
| Name | Appointed as ACJ in HC of | Date of appointment as Judge | Period as Acting Chief Justice | Date of retirement | Tenure as ACJ | Tenure as Judge | Remarks | Ref.. |
|---|---|---|---|---|---|---|---|---|
| S. B. Barman | Orissa | 3 February 1958 | 28 Dec 1964 – 17 Jan 1965 | 30 April 1969 | 21 days | 11 years, 87 days | -- | |
| Ranganath Mishra | Orissa | 4 July 1969 | 6 Nov 1980 – 15 Jan 1981 | 14 March 1983^{[‡]} | 71 days | 13 years, 254 days | Became permanent | |
| Prafulla Kishore Mohanti | Orissa | 2 January 1974 | 14 Mar 1983 – 10 Aug 1983 | 15 July 1984 | 150 days | 10 years, 196 days | -- | |
| B. N. Misra | Orissa | 5 January 1981 | 1 Mar 1986 – 30 Apr 1986 | 8 November 1992 | 61 days | 11 years, 309 days | -- | |
| Radha Charan Pattnaik | Orissa | 18 September 1981 | 1 Aug 1989 – 21 Feb 1990 | 30 May 1992^{[†]} | 205 days | 10 years, 76 days | -- | |
| G. B. Pattanaik | Orissa | 1 June 1983 | 26 Apr 1995 – 18 May 1995 | 10 September 1995^{[‡]} | 23 days | 12 years, 102 days | Elevated as CJ of Patna | |
| Debi Priya Mohapatra | Orissa | 18 November 1983 | 19 May 1995 – 15 Feb 1996 | 8 December 1998^{[‡]} | 273 days | 15 years, 21 days | Elevated as CJ of Allahabad | |
| Arijit Pasayat | Orissa | 20 March 1989 | 2 Apr 1999 – 20 Sep 1999 | 18 October 2001^{[‡]} | 171 days | 12 years, 213 days | Elevated as CJ of Kerala | |
| R. K. Patra | Orissa | 22 June 1992 | 21 Sep 1999 – 17 Nov 1999 | 23 November 2004 | 58 days | 12 years, 155 days | -- | |
| R. K. Patra | Orissa | 22 June 1992 | 19 Oct 2000 – 16 Feb 2001 | 23 November 2004 | 121 days | 12 years, 155 days | -- | |
| R. K. Patra | Orissa | 22 June 1992 | 25 Sep 2001 – 4 Dec 2001 | 23 November 2004 | 71 days | 12 years, 155 days | -- | |
| L. K. Mohapatra | Allahabad | 16 January 1999 | 19 Sep 2013 – 20 Oct 2013 | 9 June 2016 | 32 days | 17 years, 146 days | Transferred to Manipur | |
| L. K. Mohapatra | Manipur | 16 January 1999 | 21 Oct 2013 – 9 Jul 2014 | 9 June 2016 | 262 days | 17 years, 146 days | Became permanent | |
| P. K. Mohanty | Orissa | 7 March 2002 | 24 Dec 2012 – 26 Feb 2013 | 9 June 2017 | 65 days | 15 years, 95 days | -- | |
| P. K. Mohanty | Orissa | 7 March 2002 | 19 Sep 2013 – 11 Oct 2013 | 9 June 2017 | 23 days | 15 years, 95 days | -- | |
| P. K. Mohanty | Orissa | 7 March 2002 | 7 Jul 2014 – 5 Aug 2014 | 9 June 2017 | 30 days | 15 years, 95 days | -- | |
| P. K. Mohanty | Orissa | 7 March 2002 | 27 Feb 2015 – 3 Jun 2015 | 9 June 2017 | 97 days | 15 years, 95 days | -- | |
| P. K. Mohanty | Orissa | 7 March 2002 | 15 Feb 2016 – 25 Feb 2016 | 9 June 2017 | 11 days | 15 years, 95 days | -- | |
| P. K. Mohanty | Jharkhand | 7 March 2002 | 7 Oct 2016 – 23 Mar 2017 | 9 June 2017 | 168 days | 15 years, 95 days | Became permanent | |
| Indrajit Mahanty | Orissa | 31 March 2006 | 7 Aug 2018 – 11 Aug 2018 | 10 November 2022 | 5 days | 16 years, 225 days | -- | |
| Sanju Panda | Orissa | 1 March 2007 | 5 Jan 2020 – 26 Apr 2020 | 9 July 2021 | 113 days | 14 years, 131 days | -- | |
| S. K. Mishra | Uttarakhand | 7 October 2009 | 24 Dec 2021 – 28 Jun 2022 | 28 December 2023 | 187 days | 14 years, 83 days | -- | |
| B. R. Sarangi | Orissa | 20 June 2013 | 4 Oct 2023 – 6 Feb 2024 | 19 July 2024 | 126 days | 11 years, 30 days | -- | |
| Bibhu Prasad Routray | Orissa | 8 November 2019 | 16 Nov 2026 – Incumbent | Incumbent | 6 days | 7 years, 14 days | | |

== Judges elevated to Supreme Court of India ==
This section includes the list of only those judges whose parent high court was Orissa. This includes those judges who, at the time of elevation to Supreme Court of India, may not be serving in Orissa High Court but this list does not include judges who at the time of elevation were serving in Orissa High Court but does not have Orissa as their Parent High Court.

Colour Key

- Female Judge
- Served as Chief Justice of India

Symbol Key

- ^{RES} Resigned
- ^{†} Died in office

| # | Name of the Judge | Image | Date of Appointment | | Date of Retirement | Tenure | | | Immediately preceding office |
| # | Name of the Judge | Image | In Parent High Court | In Supreme Court | Date of Retirement | In High Court(s) | In Supreme Court | Total tenure (Note: Includes both tenure as High Court Judge as well as Supreme Court Judge) | Immediately preceding office |
|---|---|---|---|---|---|---|---|---|---|
| 1 | Bachu Jagannadha Das | | 26 July 1948 | 9 March 1953 | 26 July 1958 | 4 years, 226 days | 5 years, 140 days | 10 years, 1 day | 2nd CJ of Orissa HC |
| 2 | Ranganath Misra | | 4 July 1969 | 15 March 1983 | 24 November 1991 | 13 years, 254 days | 8 years, 255 days | 22 years, 144 days | 10th CJ of Orissa HC |
| 3 | Radha Charan Patnaik | | 18 September 1981 | 3 December 1991 | 30 May 1992^{[†]} | 10 years, 76 days | 180 days | 10 years, 256 days | Judge of Orissa HC |
| 4 | Gopal Ballav Pattanaik | | 1 June 1983 | 11 September 1995 | 18 December 2002 | 12 years, 102 days | 7 years, 99 days | 19 years, 201 days | 27th CJ of Patna HC |
| 5 | Deba Priya Mohapatra | | 18 November 1983 | 9 December 1998 | 2 August 2002 | 15 years, 21 days | 3 years, 237 days | 18 years, 258 days | 35th CJ of Allahabad HC |
| 6 | Arijit Pasayat | | 20 March 1989 | 19 October 2001 | 10 May 2009 | 12 years, 213 days | 7 years, 204 days | 20 years, 52 days | 20th CJ of Delhi HC |
| 7 | Ananga Kumar Patnaik | | 13 January 1994 | 17 November 2009 | 2 June 2014 | 15 years, 308 days | 4 years, 198 days | 20 years, 141 days | 19th CJ of Madhya Pradesh HC |
| 8 | Dipak Misra | | 17 January 1996 | 10 October 2011 | 2 October 2018 | 15 years, 266 days | 6 years, 358 days | 22 years, 259 days | 26th CJ of Delhi HC |
