= Khallikote University =

Defunct state university in Odisha, India

Coordinates: 19.3075°N 84.7944°E

- Motto: Let my life be an open book
- Type: Public
- Active: 2015–2021
- Location: Brahmapur, Odisha, India
- Website: www.kub.ac.in

Khallikote University was a state university situated in Brahmapur, Odisha. It was founded in 2015 as a cluster university with five constituent colleges, transformed into a unitary university in 2020 and merged with Berhampur University in 2021, thus ceasing operation.

== History ==
Khallikote University was established in 2015 as the first cluster university in Odisha. This was achieved by excluding five colleges from the jurisdiction of Berhampur University (BU) and granting them autonomy, also allowing them to share infrastructure and faculty. The five colleges were Khallikote College, Sashi Bhusan Rath Government Women's College, Government Science, Chhatrapur College, Binayak Acharya College and Gopalpur College. In 2020, the university was changed to a unitary university, i.e., a university with no affiliated colleges, and the five colleges were re-affiliated to BU. In 2021, the university itself was merged with BU and ceased operation.
