= V. V. Giri =

President of India from 1969 to 1974

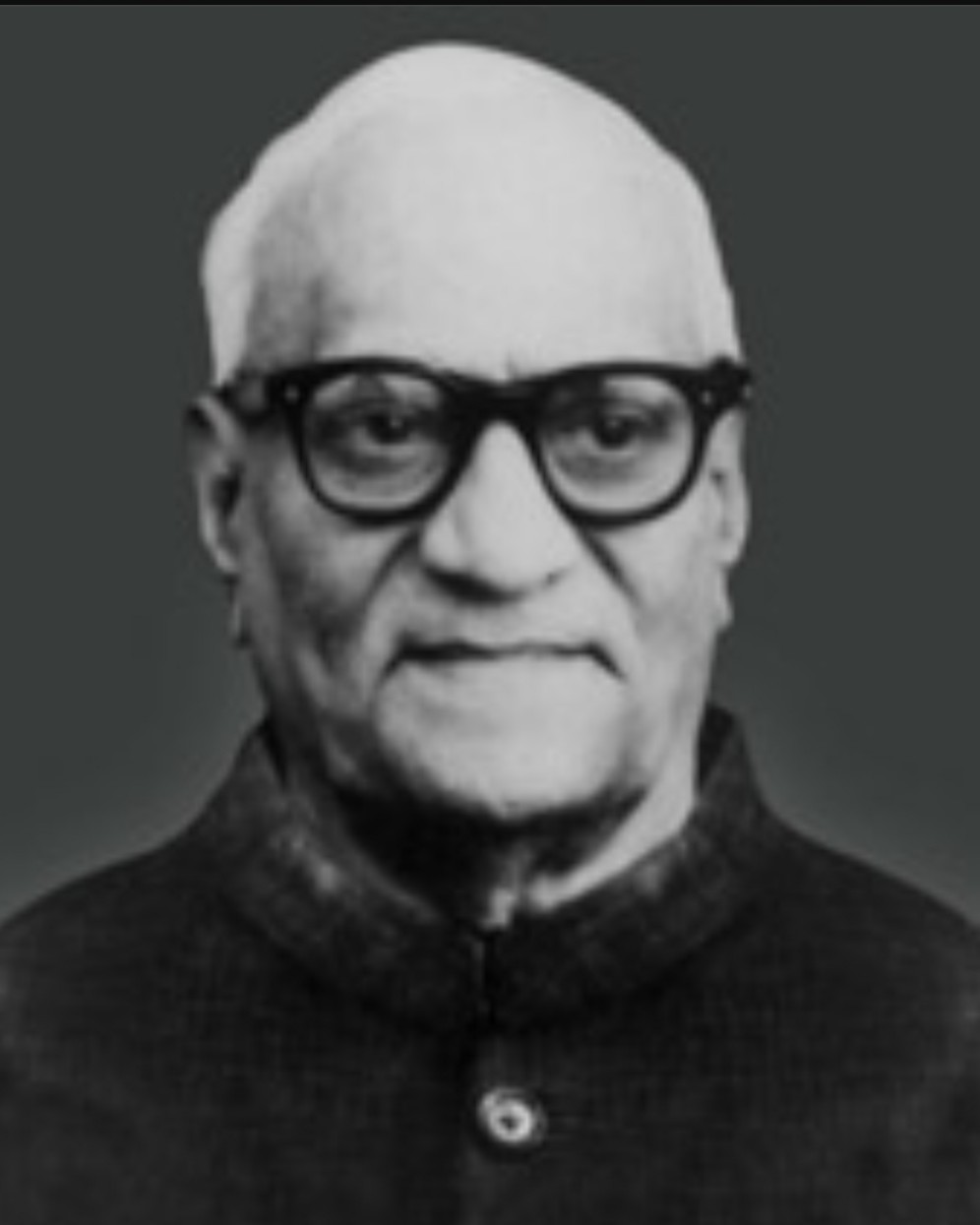
- Official portrait, c.1968

President of India
- In office 24 August 1969 – 24 August 1974
- Prime Minister: Indira Gandhi
- Vice President: Gopal Swarup Pathak
- Preceded by: Mohammad Hidayatullah (acting)
- Succeeded by: Fakhruddin Ali Ahmed
- Interim; 3 May 1969 – 20 July 1969
- Prime Minister: Indira Gandhi
- Preceded by: Zakir Husain
- Succeeded by: Mohammad Hidayatullah

Vice President of India
- In office 13 May 1967 – 3 May 1969
- President: Zakir Husain
- Prime Minister: Indira Gandhi
- Preceded by: Zakir Husain
- Succeeded by: Gopal Swarup Pathak
Gubernatorial offices
Governor of Mysore State
In office 2 April 1965 – 13 May 1967
Chief Minister	S. Nijalingappa
Preceded by	Satyawant Mallannah Shrinagesh
Succeeded by	Gopal Swarup Pathak
Governor of Kerala
In office 1 July 1960 – 2 April 1965
Chief Minister	Pattom Thanu Pillai; R. Sankar
Preceded by	Burgula Ramakrishna Rao
Succeeded by	Ajit Prasad Jain
Governor of Uttar Pradesh
In office 10 June 1957 – 30 June 1960
Chief Minister	Sampurnanand
Preceded by	Kanaiyalal Maneklal Munshi
Succeeded by	Burgula Ramakrishna Rao
Ministerial offices
Union Minister of Labour
In office 13 May 1952 – 7 September 1954
Prime Minister	Jawaharlal Nehru
Preceded by	Jagjivan Ram
Succeeded by	Khandubhai Kasanji Desai
Minister of Labour and Industry of Madras Presidency
In office 30 April 1946 – 23 March 1947
Chief Minister	Tanguturi Prakasam
In office 14 July 1937 – 9 October 1939
Premier	C. Rajagopalachari

Member of Parliament, Lok Sabha
- In office 17 April 1952 – 4 April 1957
- Preceded by: Constituency established
- Succeeded by: Constituency abolished
- Constituency: Pathapatnam, Andhra Pradesh

Indian High Commissioner to Ceylon
- In office 1947 – 1951
- Appointed by: Lord Mountbatten
- Preceded by: Office established
- Succeeded by: K. P. Kesava Menon

Personal details
- Born: Varahagiri Venkata Giri; 10 August 1894 Berhampur, Madras Presidency, British India (present-day Brahmapur, Odisha, India)
- Died: 24 June 1980 (aged 85) Madras, Tamil Nadu, India (present-day Chennai)
- Cause of death: Heart attack
- Party: Independent
- Spouse: Saraswati Bai (m. 1926; died 1978)
- Children: 14
- Relatives: Palagummi Sainath (grandson)
- Education: Khallikote College, University of Madras; University College Dublin
- Profession: Activist; politician

Varahagiri Venkata Giri (10 August 1894 – 24 June 1980), better known as V. V. Giri was an Indian statesman, activist, and diplomat who served as the president of India from 1969 to 1974. He previously served as the vice president of India from 1967 to 1969 and the minister of labour from 1952 to 1954.

Born in Berhampur to a Telugu Brahmin family, Giri completed his higher education at Khallikote College where he was elected to the student union, and was active in the freedom movement. He moved to Ireland in 1913 to study law at the University College Dublin (UCD) and the Honourable Society of King's Inns, Dublin. He was called to the Irish Bar in June 1916 but he did not complete his studies for a BA in UCD. He enrolled at Madras High Court in 1916 upon returning to India. Giri became a member of the Indian National Congress and the Home Rule Movement. After abandoning his legal career as part of the Non-Cooperation Movement in 1920, he was arrested for demonstrations in 1922. Giri was closely associated with the Indian labour movement, and was elected president of the All India Trade Union Congress in 1926.

Giri was elected a member of the Imperial Legislative Assembly in 1934, and became the minister for labour and industry in 1937 under C. Rajagopalachari. After the congress ministries resigned in protest at India being made to be a part of the Second World War in 1939, Giri returned to the Labour movement and was later arrested, spending 15 months in prison until 1941. He was arrested again after the launch of the Quit India Movement, and he was imprisoned for three years from 1942 to 1945. In the General Elections of 1946, Giri was elected to the Madras Legislative Assembly and became a minister again in charge of the labour portfolio under T. Prakasam. From 1947 to 1951, he served as India's first High Commissioner to Ceylon.

Giri was elected to the 1st Lok Sabha from Pathapatnam Lok Sabha Constituency in 1951. He served as the Union minister of labour in the Nehru government from 1952 until his resignation in 1954. He was defeated in the Pathapatnam constituency at the 1957 elections and was appointed the Governor of Uttar Pradesh in the same year. He then served as the Governor of Kerala from 1960 to 1965 and the Governor of Karnataka 1965 to 1967. Giri was elected vice president in the 1967 election. Following the death of president Zakir Husain, Giri became acting president in May 1969 before resigning in July to contest the subsequent presidential election as an independent candidate. His endorsement by prime minister Indira Gandhi helped his victory in the election, and Giri served as president of India from 1969 to 1974. Gandhi chose not renominate him in 1974. After the end of his full term, Giri was honoured by the Government of India with the Bharat Ratna in 1975. He died of a heart attack at the age of 85 in 1980.

== Early life and family ==
V. V. Giri was born in Berhampur, Madras Presidency (present-day Odisha) in a Telugu Brahmin family. His parents hailed from Chintalapudi village in East Godavari district of Andhra Pradesh and shifted to Berhampur for their bright future. His father, V. V. Jogayya Pantulu, was a successful lawyer and political activist of the Indian National Congress who had been working at Berhampur. Giri's mother Subhadramma was active in the national movement in Berhampur during the Non Cooperation and Civil Disobedience Movements and was arrested for leading a strike for prohibition during the Civil Disobedience Movement.

Giri was married to Saraswati Bai and the couple had 14 children.

Giri completed his initial primary education at Hillpatna Primary School, Berhampur and higher education at the Khallikote College {now Khallikote College (Autonomous) and Unitary University}, then affiliated with Madras University, in Chennai. V.V. Giri was also elected to the student union of Khallikote College for three consecutive times and highly active in freedom movement during his student days in Berhampur.

In 1913, he moved to Ireland to study law at University College Dublin and the Honourable Society of King's Inns, Dublin between 1913 and 1916. Giri was one among the first group of thirteen Indian students who sat the obligatory year long course at UCD in 1914–15. This was a requirement for being called to the Irish Bar through study at the King's Inns. In total, 50 Indian students studied at UCD between 1914 and 1917. Indian students preferred Ireland over England for their studies, as the Irish showed neither racial discrimination nor colour prejudice, likely due to their own historical experiences. Moreover, in 1912, the admission policies for Indians at the Inns of Court in London and other English institutions had become more rigid, which led many Indian students to choose Ireland due to its relaxed regulations.

Giri and a fellow law student also enrolled in the full bachelor of arts course in UCD. Giri studied English, where he met Thomas MacDonagh, and Political Economy. His lecturer in political economy was the reformer and co-operativist Thomas A. Finlay SJ.

During the World War I, Giri travelled from Dublin to London and met Mahatma Gandhi. Gandhi wanted Giri to join the Imperial war effort as a Red Cross Volunteer. Giri initially acceded to Gandhi's request but later regretted his decision. According to one of Giri's biographers, "Gandhiji with his characteristic magnanimity relieved Giri of the obligation to join the Red Cross and did not breathe a word about it to anyone.”

Giri was active in both Indian and Irish politics during his studies. In My Life and Times, Giri recalled that, coming directly from India with a burning zeal for independence, he felt an instant kinship with the Irish nationalist cause. While in Dublin, he joined a secret outfit known as the “Anarchical Society,” which, according to him, advocated the use of violence and bloodshed as a means to secure peace. There, he also acquired knowledge of incendiary methods and bomb-making techniques intended to support India's liberation movement. Along with fellow Indian students he produced a pamphlet documenting the abuse of Indians in South Africa. The pamphlet was intercepted by Indian Political Intelligence and resulted in increased police scrutiny of Giri and his fellow students in Dublin. Meanwhile, anonymous articles were written by Indian students for the newspaper of the Irish Volunteers and in The National Student, a UCD student magazine.

He was suspected of association with prominent ring leaders in the 1916 Rising including James Connolly, Pádraig H. Pearse and the young Éamon de Valera. Giri was called to the Irish Bar on 21 June 1916 but he did not complete his studies for BA in UCD. Indian students were subjected to police raids following the 1916 Rising and Giri recounts how he was served with one month's notice to leave Ireland on 1 June 1916.

== Career ==
Upon returning to India in 1916 Giri enrolled at the Madras High Court. He also became a member of the Congress party, attended its Lucknow session and joined the Home Rule Movement of Annie Besant. Giri abandoned a flourishing legal career in response to Mahatma Gandhi's call for a Non-Cooperation Movement in 1920. In 1922, he was arrested for the first time for demonstrating against the sale of liquor shops.

=== Role in the labour movement ===
Giri was closely associated with the labour and trade union movement in India throughout his career. Giri was a founding member of the All India Railwaymen's Federation which was formed in 1923 and served as its general secretary for over a decade. He was elected president of the All India Trade Union Congress for the first time in 1926. Giri also founded the Bengal Nagpur Railway Association and in 1928 led the workers of the Bengal Nagpur Railway in a non violent strike for the rights of retrenched workers. The strike succeeded in forcing the British Indian government and the management of the railway company to concede the workers' demands and is regarded as a milestone in the labour movement in India. In 1929, the Indian Trade Union Federation (ITUF) was formed by Giri, N. M. Joshi and others with Giri as the president. The split with the AITUC came about over the issue of cooperating with the Royal Commission on Labour. Giri and the ITUF leadership of liberals decided to cooperate with the commission while the AITUC decided to boycott it. The ITUF merged with the AITUC in 1939 and Giri became president of the AITUC for a second time in 1942.

Giri was the Workers' Delegate of the Indian delegation at the International Labour Conference of the ILO in 1927. At the Second Round Table Conference, Giri was present as a representative of the industrial workers of India. Giri worked towards getting the trade unions to support the freedom movement in India and was twice president of the AITUC which was closely allied with the Indian National Congress.

== Electoral career in British India ==
Giri became a member of the Imperial Legislative Assembly in 1934. He remained its member until 1937 and emerged a spokesman for matters of labour and trade unions in the Assembly.

In the General Elections of 1936, Giri defeated the Raja of Bobbili to become a member of the Madras Legislative Assembly. Between 1937 and 1939, he was Minister for Labour and Industry in the Congress government headed by C Rajagopalachari. Giri was appointed Governor of the National Planning Committee of the Indian National Congress in 1938. In 1939, the Congress ministries resigned in protest against the British decision to make India a party in the Second World War. Having returned to the labour movement, Giri was arrested and spent 15 months in prison until March 1941.

Following the launch of the Quit India Movement, Giri was imprisoned again by the colonial government in 1942. He remained in prison when the AITUC met in Nagpur in 1943 where he was the president elect. Giri served his sentence in the Vellore and Amaravathi prisons. Giri remained in prison for three years, his longest sentence, until his release in 1945.

In the General Elections of 1946, Giri was reelected to the Madras Legislative Assembly and became a minister again in charge of the labour portfolio under T. Prakasam.

== Career in independent India ==
From 1947 to 1951, Giri served as India's first High Commissioner to Ceylon(Sri Lanka ). In the General Elections of 1951, he was elected to the 1st Lok Sabha from Pathapatnam Lok Sabha Constituency in the Madras State.

=== Union Minister for Labour (1952–1954) ===
On being elected to Parliament, Giri was appointed Minister of Labour in 1952. His policy initiatives as minister gave rise to the Giri Approach in industrial dispute resolution. The Giri approach emphasizes negotiations between the management and workers as the means for resolving industrial disputes. It holds that the failure of such negotiations should lead not to compulsory adjudication but to further negotiations through conciliation officers. However, differences with the government over patronage to trade unions, trade union and government opposition to the Giri Approach and the government's decision to reduce the wages of bank employees led him to resign from government in August 1954.

In the General Elections of 1957, Giri lost from the Parvatipuram double-member constituency. (Note: In the General Elections of 1952 and 1957, 83 dual member constituencies electing a member each from the general population and the Scheduled Caste or Scheduled Tribes was established. The general candidates including Giri received fewer votes than the Scheduled Caste candidates in Parvatipuram resulting in both the Scheduled Caste candidates being declared elected. Giri unsuccessfully challenged the verdict in court. By the Two Member Constituency (Abolition) Act, 1961 this system of double member constituencies was abolished.) Giri played an important role in founding the Indian Society of Labour Economics (ISLE). In June 1957, he was appointed Governor of Uttar Pradesh.

=== Gubernatorial tenures (1957–1967) ===
Between 1957 and 1967, Giri served as governor of Uttar Pradesh (1957–1960), Kerala (1960–1965) and Karnataka (1965–1967).

==== Governor of Kerala (1960–1965) ====
Giri was sworn in as the second Governor of Kerala on 1 July 1960. As Governor, Giri's active voicing of Kerala's fiscal needs with the Planning Commission led to the state being allocated significantly more funds in the Third Five Year Plan. When defections from the ruling Congress Party reduced the government to a minority, Giri recommended the imposition of President's Rule in Kerala after determining that an alternative government could not be formed. A hung assembly resulted from the elections to the Kerala Legislative Assembly in 1965. Since no party had a majority and no alliances commanding a majority could be formed, Giri again recommended the dissolution of the assembly and the imposition of President's Rule in the state.

== Vice presidency (1967–1969) and Acting presidency (1969) ==
=== election as vice president ===
Giri was elected the third vice president of India on 13 May 1967, a post he held for nearly two years until 3 May 1969. Giri was the first vice president to not complete his full term in office on account of being elevated to the office of the president and was the third vice president to be elected to the presidency.

Following the death in office of President Zakir Husain on 3 May 1969, Giri was sworn in as acting president the same day. Giri resigned from his post on 20 July 1969 to contest the presidential elections as an independent candidate. Immediately before resigning, Giri, in his capacity as acting president, promulgated an ordinance that nationalised 14 banks and insurance companies. He was succeeded as acting president by Mohammad Hidayatullah, the Chief Justice of India. (Note: Following Giri's resignation, the offices of president and vice president became vacant, with the Constitution of India requiring the Chief Justice of India to act as president. Justice Hidayatullah served as acting president during July – August 1969. Elected vice president in 1979, he again served as acting president in October 1982. He is the only person in India to have served twice as acting president.)

=== Presidential election of 1969 ===
The election of a new president became a contest between the Prime Minister Indira Gandhi and the old guard of the Congress Party known as the Syndicate. The All India Congress Committee decided to support Neelam Sanjiva Reddy as the presidential candidate, disregarding the Prime Minister's opposition. Giri, who was vice president, resigned and decided to contest as an independent candidate. Prime Minister Gandhi then decided to support him, endorsing a "vote of conscience" that allowed Congress legislators to vote for Giri. The election, held on 16 August 1969, witnessed a contest between Reddy, Giri and the opposition candidate C D Deshmukh. In the closely fought election V V Giri emerged victorious, winning 48.01 per cent of the first preference votes and subsequently getting a majority on counting the second preference votes. In the final tally, Giri had 420,077 votes against the quota of 418,169 votes required to be elected president.

Following Giri's election, an election petition was filed in the Supreme Court of India contesting its validity on the grounds of having used corrupt practices to influence voters. Giri, unusually for an incumbent president of India, chose to appear in person before the Court where he was examined as a witness. The Court ultimately dismissed the petition and upheld Giri's election as president.

== Presidency (1969-1974) ==
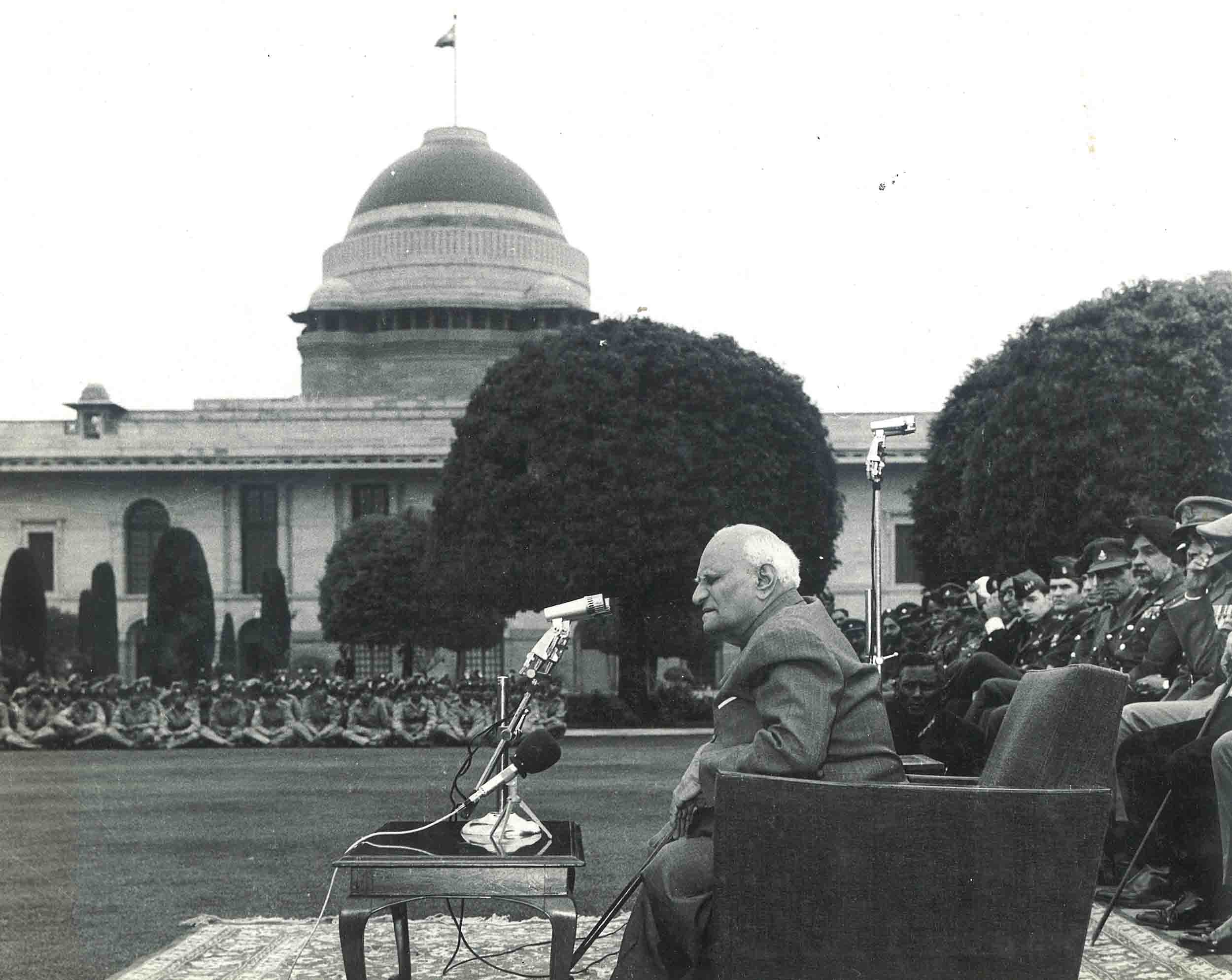
V. V. Giri addressing NCC Cadets

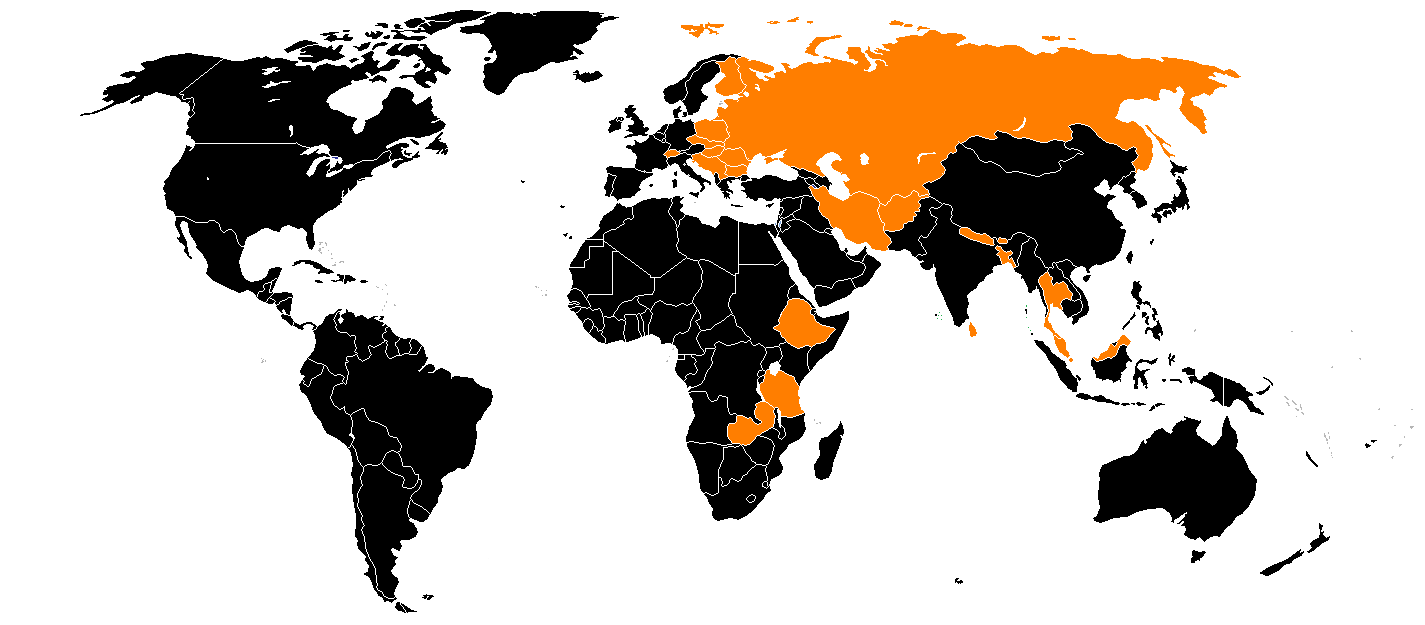
As President of India Giri led 14 state visits to countries in south and southeast Asia, the Soviet bloc and Africa

=== Presidential election ===
Giri was sworn in as President of India on 24 August 1969 and held office until 24 August 1974 when he was succeeded by Fakhruddin Ali Ahmed. On his election, Giri became the only president to have also been an acting president.

=== Tenure ===
As president, Giri unquestioningly accepted Prime Minister Indira Gandhi's decision to sack the Charan Singh ministry in Uttar Pradesh and advised her to go in for early elections in 1971. The ordinance abolishing privy purses and privileges of the erstwhile rulers of India's princely states was promulgated by Giri after the government's original amendment was defeated in the Rajya Sabha. His advice to Prime Minister Gandhi against the appointment of A. N. Ray as the Chief Justice of India superseding three judges senior to him was ignored by her as was his warning that a crackdown on striking railwaymen would only exacerbate the situation. As president, Giri made 14 state visits to 22 countries in south and southeast Asia, Europe and Africa.

=== Legacy and succession ===
Giri is regarded as a president who completely subordinated himself to the prime minister and has been described as a "Prime Minister's President", a loyalist president and a rubber stamp president under whom the independence of the office eroded. When Giri's term ended in 1974, Prime Minister Indira Gandhi chose not to renominate him to the presidency and instead chose Fakhruddin Ali Ahmed, who was elected in the presidential election of 1974.

== Awards and honours ==
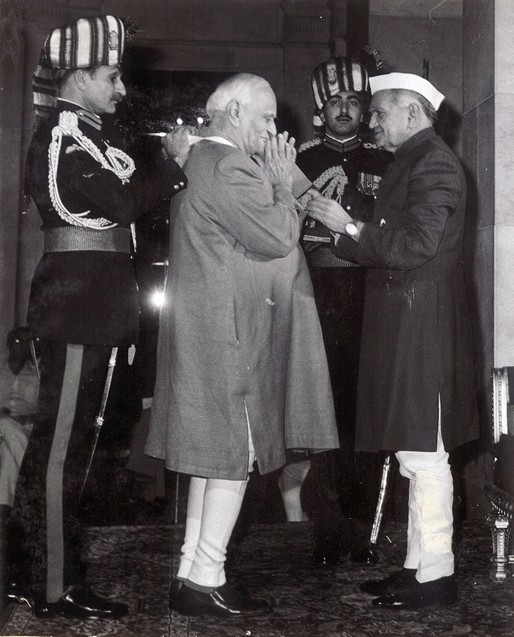
President Fakhruddin Ali Ahmed conferring the Bharat Ratna on Giri

=== National honours ===
- India:
  - Bharat Ratna (1975)

=== Foreign honours ===
- Imperial Iran:
  - 2500th Anniversary of the Persian Empire Medal (1971)
- Bhutan:
  - King Jigme Singye Wangchuck Investiture Medal (1974)

Giri was honoured with India's highest civilian award, the Bharat Ratna, in 1975 for his contributions in the area of public affairs. As president, Giri had suo motu conferred the Bharat Ratna on Prime Minister Indira Gandhi in 1971. Giri was in turn conferred the Bharat Ratna in 1975 on the recommendation of Prime Minister Gandhi, in an act seen as a quid pro quo measure. Giri was the fourth of the six Presidents of India to have been conferred the Bharat Ratna (viz. Rajendra Prasad, Sarvepalli Radhakrishnan, Zakir Husain, V. V. Giri, A. P. J. Abdul Kalam and Pranab Mukherjee).

== Death ==
V.V. Giri died of a heart attack in his Madras residency, on 24 June 1980.

He was given a state funeral the next day and a week-long mourning period was declared by the Government of India. Rajya Sabha, of which Giri had been ex-officio chairman as Vice President of India, adjourned for two days as a mark of respect to him.

== Commemoration ==
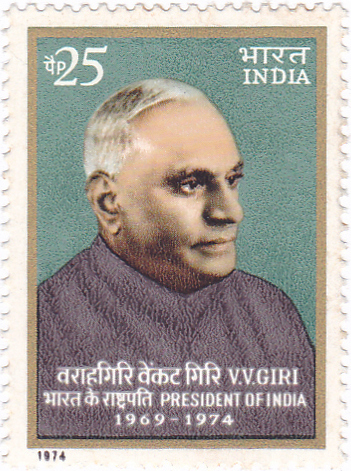
Giri on a 1974 stamp of India

A commemorative postage stamp on V.V. Giri was released by the Indian Posts and Telegraphs Department in 1974. The National Labour Institute was renamed in honour of V.V. Giri in 1995. V.V. Giri's hometown of Berhampur in Odisha has a major road, a secondary training school and a big market that are named after him. V.V.Giri donated his huge & historic bungalow in Brahmapur for a Girls School (Now its famous as GIRI Girls High School. It is also the first girls' school and a famous secondary government school in Odisha). The British time market 'Victoria Market' is also renamed as GIRI Market in Berhampur. The family members of VV Giri resides in another small bungalow at Giri Road in Berhampur.

Giri authored Industrial Relations and Labour Problems in Indian Industry, two popular books on issues of labour in India. His memoirs, published in 1976, are titled My Life and Times.

- Commemorative Medal of the 2500th Anniversary of the founding of the Persian Empire (14 October 1971).
- King Jigme Singye Investiture Medal (Kingdom of Bhutan, 2 June 1974)

== See also ==
- List of Indian writers

Political offices
Preceded by Kanhaiyalal Maneklal Munshi	Minister of Labour and Employment; 1952–1954	Succeeded by Burgula Ramakrishna Rao
Preceded by Kanhaiyalal Maneklal Munshi	Governor of Uttar Pradesh; 1957–1960	Succeeded by Burgula Ramakrishna Rao
Preceded by Burgula Ramakrishna Rao	Governor of Kerala; 1960–1965	Succeeded by Ajit Prasad Jain
Preceded by Satyawant Mallannah Shrinagesh	Governor of Mysore State; 1965–1967	Succeeded by Gopal Swarup Pathak
Preceded by Zakir Husain	Vice President of India; 1967–1969	Succeeded by Gopal Swarup Pathak
Preceded by Zakir Husain	President of India (acting); 1969	Succeeded by Mohammad Hidayatullah (acting)
Preceded by Mohammad Hidayatullah (acting)	President of India; 1969–1974	Succeeded by Fakhruddin Ali Ahmed
