= List of former chief justices of the high courts of India =

This Article is a consolidated list of former chief justices of all high courts of India. This list includes only permanent Chief Justices.

High Court of Judicature at Allahabad established on 17 March 1866 has have the maximum number of chief justices totalling 51 while Andhra Pradesh High Court established on 1 January 2019 has have least number of chief justices totalling 5 only as of 1 May 2026.

Colour Key

- Served as Chief Justice of India
- Female Chief Justice
- Elevated to Supreme Court of India
- Female chief justice elevated to Supreme Court of India

Symbol Key

- ^{‡} Resigned
- ^{†} Died in office

Chief Justices elevated to Supreme Court of India includes those who were elevated to supreme court at any point of their career.

Chief Justices mentioned in italics were those who were serving as Acting Chief Justice in the same high court immediately before their permanent appointment.

Date of initial appointment - Date of first appointment as High court judge

CJ - Chief Justice

== Allahabad High Court ==
The Allahabad High Court was established on 17 March 1866 under Indian High Courts Act 1861 and has had 50 permanent Chief Justices and several Acting Chief Justices.

#	Name	Portrait	Date of Appointment	Date of Retirement	Tenure	Parent High Court	Date of initial Appointment	Notes & References
1	Walter Morgan		17 March 1866	21 November 1871	5 years, 250 days	Calcutta	1 July 1862	(Note: Transferred to Madras High Court)
2	Robert Stuart		22 November 1871	31 October 1884	12 years, 345 days	Bar	--	
3	William Comer Petheram		1 November 1884	23 March 1886	1 year, 143 days	Bar	--	(Note: Transferred to Calcutta High Court)
4	John Edge		27 May 1886	30 March 1898^{[‡]}	11 years, 308 days	Bar	--	
5	Louis Addin Kershaw		6 April 1898	11 November 1898	220 days	Bar	--	(Note: Transferred to Bombay High Court)
6	Arthur Strachey		12 November 1898	14 May 1901^{[†]}	2 years, 184 days	Bombay	1895	
7	John Stanley		17 August 1901	21 April 1911	9 years, 248 days	Calcutta	November 1898	
8	Henry George Richards		21 April 1911	28 October 1919	8 years, 191 days	Allahabad	1905	
9	Edward Grimwood Mears		29 October 1919	15 March 1932	12 years, 139 days	Bar	--	
10	Shah Muhammad Sulaiman		16 March 1932	30 September 1937	5 years, 199 days	Allahabad	April 1923	(Note: Then known as Federal Court of India)
11	John Gibb Thom		1 October 1937	19 February 1941^{[†]}	3 years, 142 days	Bar	--	
12	Iqbal Ahmad		21 July 1941	16 September 1946	5 years, 58 days	Allahabad	1932	(Note: He became ACJ on 20 February 1941 and served till 20 July 1941 for 151 days before becoming permanent Chief Justice)
13	Kamalkanta Verma		17 September 1946	14 October 1947	1 year, 28 days	Allahabad	1937	(Note: After retirement from Allahabad High Court, he was appointed as Chief Justice of the High Court of Princely State of Udaipur (later became Rajasthan High Court))
14	Bidhu Bhushan Malik		15 October 1947	11 January 1955	7 years, 89 days	Allahabad	13 March 1944	
15	Orby Howell Mootham		12 January 1955	16 February 1961	6 years, 36 days	Allahabad	22 July 1946	
16	Manulal Chunilal Desai		17 February 1961	24 February 1966	5 years, 8 days	Allahabad	13 December 1948	
17	Vashishtha Bhargava		25 February 1966	7 August 1966	164 days	Allahabad	1 August 1949	
18	Mirza Nasirullah Beg		24 September 1966	3 June 1967	253 days	Allahabad	1 June 1951	(Note: He became ACJ on 8 August 1966 and served till 23 September 1966 for 47 days before becoming permanent Chief Justice)
19	Vidyadhar Govind Oak		4 June 1967	18 May 1971	3 years, 349 days	Allahabad	31 March 1955	
20	Shashi Kanta Verma		19 May 1971	5 November 1973	2 years, 171 days	Allahabad	30 June 1958	
21	Dhatri Saran Mathur		6 November 1973	13 November 1974	1 year, 8 days	Allahabad	15 January 1959	
22	Kunwar Bahadur Asthana		13 November 1974	9 May 1977	2 years, 178 days	Allahabad	22 August 1961	
23	Deshmudre Mallappa Chandrashekhar		10 May 1977	21 March 1978	316 days	Karnataka	20 September 1963	(Note: Transferred to Karnataka High Court)
24	Satish Chandra		22 March 1978	28 November 1983	5 years, 252 days	Allahabad	7 October 1963	
25	Mahesh Narain Shukla		12 April 1985	5 October 1985	177 days	Allahabad	14 March 1969	(Note: He became ACJ on 29 November 1983 and served till 11 April 1985 for 1 year, 134 days before becoming permanent Chief Justice)
26 Expand	Hridai Narain Seth		16 May 1986	17 August 1986	94 days	Allahabad	7 July 1969	(Note: He became ACJ on 6 October 1985 and served till 15 May 1986 for 222 days before becoming permanent Chief Justice and later transferred as CJ to Punjab and Haryana High Court)
--	N. D. Ojha		18 August 1986	30 September 1986	44 days	Allahabad	3 September 1971	
27	Kalmanje Jagannatha Shetty		1 October 1986	30 April 1987	212 days	Karnataka	25 June 1970	
28	Dwarka Nath Jha		14 July 1987	15 July 1987	2 days	Allahabad	6 August 1973	(Note: He became ACJ on 1 May 1987 and served till 13 July 1987 for 74 days before becoming permanent Chief Justice)
29	Amitav Banerji		26 April 1988	6 November 1988	195 days	Allahabad	6 August 1973	(Note: He became ACJ on 16 July 1987 and served till 25 April 1988 for 285 days before becoming permanent Chief Justice)
30 Expand	Brahma Nath Katju		7 November 1988	22 May 1989	197 days	Allahabad	6 August 1973	
--	K. C. Agarwal		23 May 1989	15 April 1990	328 days	Allahabad	6 August 1973	(Note: Elevated as Chief Justice of Rajasthan High Court)
31 Expand	Benjaram Pranaya Jeevan Reddy		16 April 1990	6 October 1991	1 year, 174 days	Andhra Pradesh	17 July 1975	
--	Prem Shankar Gupta		7 October 1991	11 November 1991	36 days	Allahabad	17 November 1977	
32 Expand	Manoj Kumar Mukherjee		12 November 1991	8 January 1993	1 year, 58 days	Calcutta	17 June 1977	
--	Satish Chandra Mathur		8 January 1993	12 October 1993	277 days	Allahabad	30 March 1978	(Note: Elevated as Chief Justice of Jammu & Kashmir High Court)
--	Viney Krishna Khanna		13 October 1993	23 April 1994	193 days	Allahabad	2 July 1979	(Note: Elevated as Chief Justice of Gauhati High Court)
33	Sarvinder Singh Sodhi		29 April 1994	9 April 1995	346 days	Punjab & Haryana	18 June 1982	
34 Expand	Ambati Lakshman Rao		10 April 1995	14 January 1996	280 days	Andhra Pradesh	10 December 1982	
--	V. N. Khare		15 January 1996	1 February 1996	18 days	Allahabad	25 June 1983	(Note: Elevated as Chief Justice of Calcutta High Court)
--	Uday Pratap Singh		2 February 1996	15 February 1996	14 days	Patna	15 February 1984	
35 Expand	Deba Priya Mohapatra		16 February 1996	8 December 1998	2 years, 296 days	Orissa	18 November 1983	
--	Brijesh Kumar		9 December 1998	11 February 1999	65 days	Allahabad	24 May 1984	
36 Expand	Nirendra Krishna Mitra		12 February 1999	17 April 2000	1 year, 66 days	Calcutta	20 December 1985	
--	D. S. Sinha		18 April 2000	7 May 2000	20 days	Allahabad	17 March 1986	
37 Expand	Shyamal Kumar Sen		18 July 2000	24 November 2002	2 years, 130 days	Calcutta	17 January 1986	(Note: Sen was serving as Judge of Calcutta High Court when he was transferred as ACJ and served as such from 8 May 2000 to 17 July 2000 for 71 days before becoming permanent Chief Justice)
--	Govind Prasad Mathur		25 November 2002	19 December 2002	25 days	Allahabad	6 July 1990	(Note: Immediately elevated to Supreme Court of India)
--	Satya Prakash Srivastava		20 December 2002	30 January 2003	42 days	Allahabad	27 November 1991	
38 Expand	Tarun Chatterjee		31 January 2003	26 August 2004	1 year, 209 days	Calcutta	6 August 1990	
--	Markandey Katju		27 August 2004	27 November 2004	93 days	Allahabad	30 November 1991	(Note: Elevated as Chief Justice of Madras High Court)
--	Vishnu Sahai		28 November 2004	29 December 2004	32 days	Allahabad	1 February 1994	(Note: Retired as ACJ)
--	S. R. Alam		30 December 2004	10 January 2005	12 days	Patna	8 November 1994	
39 Expand	Ajoy Nath Ray		11 January 2005	26 January 2007	2 years, 16 days	Calcutta	6 August 1990	(Note: Transferred to Sikkim High Court)
--	S. R. Alam		27 January 2007	6 March 2007	39 days	Patna	8 November 1994	
40 Expand	Hemant Laxman Gokhale		7 March 2007	8 March 2009	2 years, 2 days	Bombay	20 January 1994	
--	S. R. Alam		9 March 2009	19 March 2009	11 days	Patna	8 November 1994	
41 Expand	Chandramauli Kumar Prasad		20 March 2009	7 February 2010	325 days	Patna	8 November 1994	
--	Amitava Lala		8 February 2010	25 June 2010	138 days	Calcutta	12 May 1997	
42 Expand	Ferdino Inacio Rebello		26 June 2010	30 July 2011	1 year, 35 days	Bombay	15 April 1996	
--	Amitava Lala		31 July 2011	4 August 2011	5 days	Calcutta	12 May 1997	
43 Expand	Syed Rafat Alam		5 August 2011	7 August 2012	1 year, 3 days	Patna	8 November 1994	(Note: CJ of Madhya Pradesh High Court transferred as CJ of Allahabad)
--	Amitava Lala		8 August 2012	19 November 2012	104 days	Calcutta	12 May 1997	
44 Expand	Shiva Kirti Singh		4 February 2013	18 September 2013	227 days	Patna	29 December 1998	(Note: He became ACJ on 20 November 2012 and served till 3 February 2013 for 76 days before becoming permanent Chief Justice and later elevated to Supreme Court of India)
--	L. K. Mohapatra		19 September 2013	20 October 2013	32 days	Orissa	16 January 1999	(Note: Transferred as ACJ of Manipur High Court)
--	Sheo Kumar Singh		21 October 2013	30 October 2013	10 days	Allahabad	24 April 2001	
45 Expand	Dhananjaya Yeshwant Chandrachud		31 October 2013	12 May 2016	2 years, 195 days	Bombay	29 March 2000	
--	Vimlesh Kumar Shukla		13 May 2016	29 July 2016	78 days	Allahabad	21 December 2002	
46	Dilip Babasaheb Bhosale		30 July 2016	23 October 2018	2 years, 86 days	Bombay	22 January 2001	
47	Govind Mathur		14 November 2018	13 April 2021	2 years, 151 days	Rajasthan	2 September 2004	(Note: He became ACJ on 24 October 2018 and served till 13 November 2018 for 21 days before becoming permanent Chief Justice)
48 Expand	Sanjay Yadav		13 June 2021	25 June 2021	13 days	Madhya Pradesh	2 March 2007	(Note: He became ACJ on 14 April 2021 and served till 12 June 2021 for 60 days before becoming permanent Chief Justice)
--	M. N. Bhandari		26 June 2021	10 October 2021	107 days	Rajasthan	5 July 2007	
49	Rajesh Bindal		11 October 2021	12 February 2023	1 year, 125 days	Punjab & Haryana	22 March 2006	
50 Expand	Pritinker Diwaker		26 March 2023	21 November 2023	241 days	Chhattisgarh	31 March 2009	(Note: He became ACJ on 13 February 2023 and served till 25 March 2023 for 41 days before becoming permanent Chief Justice)
--	M. K. Gupta		22 November 2023	4 February 2024	75 days	Allahabad	12 April 2013	

== Andhra Pradesh High Court ==
The Andhra Pradesh High Court was established on 1 January 2019 under the Andhra Pradesh Reorganisation Act, 2014 and has had 4 permanent Chief Justices and few Acting Chief Justices.

# Expand	Name	Portrait	Date of Appointment	Date of Retirement	Tenure	Parent High Court	Date of initial Appointment	Notes
--	C. Praveen Kumar		1 January 2019	6 October 2019	280 days	Andhra Pradesh	29 June 2012	(Note: Appointed as ACJ upon creation of new Andhra Pradesh High Court)
1	Jitendra Kumar Maheshwari		7 October 2019	5 January 2021	1 year, 91 days	Madhya Pradesh	25 November 2005	(Note: Transferred to Sikkim High Court)
2	Arup Kumar Goswami		6 January 2021	12 October 2021	280 days	Gauhati	24 January 2011	(Note: CJ of Sikkim High Court transferred as CJ of Andhra Pradesh and subsequently transferred as CJ to Chhattisgarh High Court)
3 Expand	Prashant Kumar Mishra		13 October 2021	18 May 2023	1 year, 218 days	Chhattisgarh	10 December 2009	
--	Akula Venkata Sesha Sai		19 May 2023	27 July 2023	70 days	Andhra Pradesh	12 April 2013	
4	Dhiraj Singh Thakur		28 July 2023	24 April 2026	2 years, 271 days	Jammu & Kashmir	8 March 2013	

== Bombay High Court ==
The Bombay High Court was established on 14 August 1862 under the Indian High Courts Act 1861 and has had 49 permanent Chief Justices and several Acting Chief Justices. Website of Maharashtra Judicial Academy contains list of its former patron in chiefs who always had been the chief justice of Bombay High Court (whether acting or permanent). Thus the list contained in this website would serve as primary reference for acting chief justices after 2009.

#	Name	Portrait	Date of Appointment	Date of Retirement	Tenure	Parent High Court	Date of initial Appointment	Notes & References
1	Matthew Richard Sausse		14 August 1862	27 April 1866	3 years, 257 days	Bar	--	
2	Richard Couch		28 April 1866	31 March 1870	3 years, 338 days	Bombay	14 August 1862	(Note: Transferred to Calcutta High Court)
3	Michael Roberts Westropp		1 April 1870	8 August 1882	12 years, 130 days	Bombay	1863	
4	Charles Sargent		9 August 1882	19 June 1895	12 years, 315 days	Bombay	3 March 1866	
5	Charles Frederick Farran		20 June 1895	9 September 1898^{[†]}	3 years, 82 days	Bombay	1890	
6	Louis Addin Kershaw		12 November 1898	17 February 1899^{[†]}	98 days	Bar	--	(Note: CJ of Allahabad High Court transferred as CJ of Bombay)
7	Lawrence Hugh Jenkins		20 April 1899	14 March 1909	9 years, 329 days	Calcutta	24 April 1896	
8	Basil Scott		22 April 1908	31 May 1919	11 years, 40 days	Bar	--	
9	Norman Cranstoun Macleod		1 June 1919	6 June 1926	7 years, 6 days	Bombay	1910	
10	Amberson Barrington Marten		7 June 1926	17 June 1930^{[‡]}	4 years, 11 days	Bombay	1916	
11	John William Fisher Beaumont		20 June 1930	29 September 1943	13 years, 102 days	Bar	--	
12	Leonard Stone		30 September 1943	3 January 1948^{[‡]}	4 years, 96 days	Bar	--	
13	Mahommedali Currim Chagla		6 February 1948	26 October 1958^{[‡]}	10 years, 257 days	Bombay	4 August 1941	(Note: He became ACJ on 3 January 1948 and served till 5 February 1948 for 34 days before becoming permanent Chief Justice)
14	Hashmatrai Khubchand Chainani		27 October 1958	28 November 1965^{[†]}	7 years, 33 days	Bombay	28 August 1948	
15	Yeshwant Shripad Tambe		7 February 1966	31 July 1966	175 days	Nagpur (Note: Nagpur High court ceased to exist on 1 November 1956 when it was converted into newly established Madhya Pradesh High Court and some of its judges became judges of Madhya Pradesh High court while some of its judges were transferred to Bombay High Court)	8 February 1954	(Note: He became ACJ on 28 November 1965 and served till 6 February 1966 for 71 days before becoming permanent Chief Justice)
16	Sohrab Peshotan Kotval		1 August 1966	27 September 1972	6 years, 58 days	Nagpur	18 August 1955	
17	Kapil Kalyandas Desai		28 September 1972	27 October 1972	30 days	Bombay	18 August 1958	
18	Ramanlal Maneklal Kantawala		28 October 1972	5 October 1978	5 years, 343 days	Bombay	9 February 1962	
19	Balkrishna Narhar Deshmukh		6 October 1978	18 November 1980	2 years, 44 days	Bombay	7 June 1965	
20	Venkat Shrinivas Deshpande		12 January 1981	10 August 1982	1 year, 211 days	Bombay	11 June 1967	(Note: He became ACJ on 19 November 1980 and served till 11 January 1981 for 54 days before becoming permanent Chief Justice)
21	Dinshah Pirosha Madon		31 August 1982	14 March 1983	196 days	Bombay	25 September 1967	(Note: He became ACJ on 11 August 1982 and served till 30 August 1982 for 20 days before becoming permanent Chief Justice and later elevated to Supreme Court of India)
22 Expand	Madhukar Narhar Chandurkar		2 January 1984	2 April 1984	92 days	Bombay	28 October 1967	(Note: He became ACJ on 15 March 1983 and served till 1 January 1984 for 293 days before becoming permanent Chief Justice and later transferred as CJ to Madras High Court)
--	M. H. Kania		2 April 1984	7 April 1984	6 days	Bombay	4 November 1969	
23	Konda Madhava Reddy		8 April 1984	21 October 1985	1 year, 197 days	Andhra Pradesh	28 May 1968	(Note: CJ of Undivided Andhra Pradesh High Court transferred as CJ of Bombay)
24 Expand	Madhukar Hiralal Kania		23 June 1986	30 April 1987	312 days	Bombay	4 November 1969	(Note: He became ACJ on 22 October 1985 and served till 22 June 1986 for 241 days before becoming permanent Chief Justice and later elevated to Supreme Court of India)
--	Sharadchandra Krishnaprasd Desai		1 May 1987	2 September 1987	125 days	Bombay	15 April 1970	(Note: Appointed as Acting Governor of Maharashtra on 3 September 1987)
--	C. S. Dharmadhikari		3 September 1987	1 November 1987	60 days	Bombay	13 July 1972	
25 Expand	Chittatosh Mookerjee		2 November 1987	1 January 1991	3 years, 61 days	Calcutta	2 April 1969	(Note: CJ of Calcutta High Court transferred as CJ of Bombay)
--	Subhash Chhaganlal Pratap		1 January 1991	6 January 1991	6 days	Bombay	19 September 1977	
26 Expand	Prabodh Dinkarrao Desai		7 January 1991	14 December 1992	1 year, 343 days	Gujarat	19 February 1970	
--	Sujata Manohar		15 December 1992	8 January 1993	25 days	Bombay	23 January 1978	
27	Manoj Kumar Mukherjee		9 January 1993	14 December 1993	340 days	Calcutta	17 June 1977	
28	Sujata Manohar		15 January 1994	20 April 1994	96 days	Bombay	23 January 1978	(Note: She became ACJ on 15 December 1993 and served till 14 January 1994 for 31 days before becoming permanent Chief Justice and later transferred as CJ to Kerala High Court)
29 Expand	Anandamoy Bhattacharjee		21 April 1994	1 April 1995^{[‡]}	346 days	Sikkim	16 June 1976	
--	Madhav Laxman Pendse		1 April 1995	27 July 1995	118 days	Bombay	25 January 1978	(Note: Elevated as Chief Justice of Karnataka High Court)
30 Expand	Manharlal Bhikhalal Shah		2 August 1995	8 December 1998	3 years, 129 days	Gujarat	28 January 1983	
--	A. C. Agarwal		9 December 1998	2 February 1999	56 days	Bombay	21 November 1986	
31 Expand	Yogesh Kumar Sabharwal		3 February 1999	28 January 2000	360 days	Delhi	17 November 1986	
--	Manohar Bansiji Ghodeswar		29 January 2000	13 February 2000	16 days	Bombay	15 November 1988	(Note: Retired as ACJ)
--	Bhagwati Prasad Saraf		14 February 2000	20 February 2000	7 days	Gauhati	2 January 1989	(Note: Elevated as Chief Justice of Jammu & Kashmir High Court)
--	Niranjan Janmashanker Pandya		21 February 2000	30 March 2000	39 days	Gujarat	21 June 1990	
32 Expand	Bisheshwar Prasad Singh		31 March 2000	13 December 2001	1 year, 258 days	Patna	9 March 1987	
--	Gulabrao Deorao Patil		14 December 2001	30 December 2001	17 days	Bombay	30 July 1990	
33 Expand	Chunilal Karsandas Thakker		31 December 2001	6 June 2004	2 years, 159 days	Gujarat	21 June 1990	(Note: CJ of Himachal Pradesh High Court transferred as CJ of Bombay)
--	A. P. Shah		7 June 2004	24 July 2004	48 days	Bombay	18 December 1992	
34 Expand	Dalveer Bhandari		25 July 2004	27 October 2005	1 year, 95 days	Delhi	19 March 1991	
--	Vishwanath Gopal Palshikar		28 October 2005	24 February 2006	120 days	Bombay	20 January 1994	
35 Expand	Kshitij Rameshbhai Vyas		25 February 2006	18 July 2006	144 days	Gujarat	22 November 1990	
--	Vishwanath Gopal Palshikar		19 July 2006	2 October 2006	120 days	Bombay	20 January 1994	
36 Expand	Harjit Singh Bedi		3 October 2006	11 January 2007	101 days	Punjab & Haryana	15 March 1991	
--	H. L. Gokhale		12 January 2007	6 March 2007	54 days	Bombay	20 January 1994	(Note: Elevated as Chief Justice of Allahabad High Court)
--	J. N. Patel		7 March 2007	30 March 2007	24 days	Bombay	11 March 1996	
37 Expand	Swatanter Kumar		31 March 2007	17 December 2009	2 years, 262 days	Delhi	10 November 1994	
--	J. N. Patel		18 December 2009	10 February 2010	55 days	Bombay	11 March 1996	
38 Expand	Anil Ramesh Dave		11 February 2010	29 April 2010	78 days	Gujarat	18 September 1995	
--	J. N. Patel		30 April 2010	25 June 2010	57 days	Bombay	11 March 1996	(Note: Elevated as Chief Justice of Calcutta High Court)
39 Expand	Mohit Shantilal Shah		26 June 2010	8 September 2015	5 years, 75 days	Gujarat	18 September 1995	
--	V. K. Tahilramani		9 September 2015	14 February 2016	159 days	Bombay	26 June 2001	
40 Expand	Dhirendra Hiralal Waghela		15 February 2016	10 August 2016	178 days	Gujarat	17 September 1999	(Note: CJ of Orissa High Court transferred as CJ of Bombay)
--	V. K. Tahilramani		11 August 2016	21 August 2016	11 days	Bombay	26 June 2001	
41 Expand	Manjula Chellur		22 August 2016	4 December 2017	1 year, 105 days	Karnataka	21 February 2000	
--	V. K. Tahilramani		5 December 2017	11 August 2018	250 days	Bombay	26 June 2001	(Note: Elevated as Chief Justice of Madras High Court)
42	Naresh Harishchandra Patil		29 October 2018	6 April 2019	160 days	Bombay	12 October 2001	(Note: He became ACJ on 12 August 2018 and served till 28 October 2018 for 78 days before becoming permanent Chief Justice)
43	Pradeep Nandrajog		7 April 2019	23 February 2020	323 days	Delhi	20 December 2002	(Note: CJ of Rajasthan High Court transferred as CJ of Bombay)
44	Bhushan Pradyumna Dharmadhikari		20 March 2020	27 April 2020	39 days	Bombay	15 March 2004	(Note: He became ACJ on 24 February 2020 and served till 19 March 2020 for 25 days before becoming permanent Chief Justice)
45 Expand	Dipankar Datta		28 April 2020	11 December 2022	2 years, 228 days	Calcutta	22 June 2006	
--	S. V. Gangapurwala		12 December 2022	27 May 2023	167 days	Bombay	13 March 2010	
46 Expand	Ramesh Deokinandan Dhanuka		28 May 2023	30 May 2023	3 days	Bombay	23 January 2012	
--	N. M. Jamdar		31 May 2023	28 July 2023	59 days	Bombay	23 January 2012	
47	Devendra Kumar Upadhyaya		29 July 2023	20 January 2025	1 year, 176 days	Allahabad	21 November 2011	(Note: Transferred to Delhi High Court)
48	Alok Aradhe		21 January 2025	28 August 2025	220 days	Madhya Pradesh	29 December 2009	(Note: CJ of Telangana High Court transferred as CJ of Bombay)
49 Expand	Shree Chandrashekhar		5 September 2025	1 June 2026	270 days	Jharkhand	17 January 2013	(Note: He became ACJ on 29 August 2025 and served till 4 September 2025 for 7 days before becoming permanent Chief Justice and later elevated to Supreme Court of India)
--	R. V. Ghuge		2 June 2026	8 September 2026	99 days	Bombay	21 June 2013	

== Calcutta High Court ==
The Calcutta High Court was established on 1 July 1862 under the Indian High Courts Act 1861 and has had 44 permanent Chief Justices and several Acting Chief Justices.

#	Name	Portrait	Date of Appointment	Date of Retirement	Tenure	Parent High Court	Date of initial Appointment	Notes & References
1	Barnes Peacock		1 July 1862	26 April 1870^{[‡]}	7 years, 300 days	Bar	--	
2	Richard Couch		26 April 1870	5 April 1875^{[‡]}	4 years, 345 days	Bombay	14 August 1862	(Note: CJ of Bombay High Court transferred as CJ of Calcutta)
3	Richard Garth		6 April 1875	26 February 1886	10 years, 327 days	Bar	--	
4	William Comer Petheram		24 March 1886	November 1896		Bar	--	(Note: CJ of Allahabad High Court transferred as CJ of Calcutta)
5	Francis William Maclean		November 1896	March 1909^{[‡]}		Bar	--	
6	Lawrence Hugh Jenkins		19 April 1909	13 November 1915^{[‡]}	6 years, 209 days	Calcutta	24 April 1896	
7	Lancelot Sanderson		13 November 1915	November 1926^{[‡]}		Bar	--	
8	George Claus Rankin		1926	1934^{[‡]}		Calcutta	1918	
9	Harold Derbyshire		12 November 1934	1946		Bar	--	
10	Arthur Trevor Harries		1946	12 June 1952		Allahabad	1934	(Note: CJ of Lahore High Court transferred as CJ of Calcutta)
11	Phani Bhusan Chakravartti		13 June 1952	11 October 1958	6 years, 121 days	Calcutta	April 1945	
12	Kulada Charan Das Gupta		12 October 1958	17 August 1959	310 days	Calcutta	June 1948	
13	Surajit Chandra Lahiri		17 August 1959	10 June 1961	1 year, 298 days	Calcutta	3 January 1949	
14	Himansu Kumar Bose		10 June 1961	1 March 1966	4 years, 265 days	Calcutta	8 December 1949	
15	Deep Narayan Sinha		1 March 1966	14 January 1970	3 years, 320 days	Calcutta	3 July 1950	
16	Prasanta Bihari Mukharji		20 May 1970	30 July 1972	2 years, 72 days	Calcutta	3 January 1949	(Note: He became ACJ on 14 January 1970 and served till 19 May 1970 for 126 days before becoming permanent Chief Justice)
17	Sankar Prasad Mitra		30 July 1972	25 December 1979	7 years, 149 days	Calcutta	23 December 1957	
18	Amarendra Nath Sen		26 December 1979	27 January 1981	1 year, 33 days	Calcutta	15 November 1965	
19	Sambhu Chandra Ghose		28 January 1981	31 December 1982	1 year, 338 days	Calcutta	25 July 1966	
20 Expand	Samarendra Chandra Deb		1 January 1983	28 February 1983	59 days	Calcutta	27 February 1968	
--	S. Mukharji		1 March 1983	14 March 1983	14 days	Calcutta	31 July 1968	(Note: Immediately elevated to Supreme Court of India)
--	Tarun Kumar Basu		15 March 1983	28 November 1983	259 days	Calcutta	31 July 1968	
21	Satish Chandra		29 November 1983	1 September 1986	2 years, 277 days	Allahabad	7 October 1963	
22	Anil Kumar Sen		2 September 1986	31 October 1986	60 days	Calcutta	8 November 1968	
23	Chittatosh Mookerjee		1 November 1986	1 November 1987	1 year, 1 day	Calcutta	2 April 1969	(Note: Transferred to Bombay High Court)
24 Expand	Debi Singh Tewatia		2 November 1987	2 May 1988^{[‡]}	183 days	Punjab & Haryana	6 February 1970	(Note: CJ of Punjab & Haryana High Court transferred as CJ of Calcutta)
--	Rabindranath Pyne		3 May 1988	19 May 1988	17 days	Calcutta	6 March 1974	(Note: Elevated as Chief Justice of Delhi High Court)
--	Manashnath Roy		20 May 1988	13 November 1988	178 days	Calcutta	10 June 1974	
25	Prabodh Dinkarrao Desai		14 November 1988	6 January 1991	2 years, 54 days	Gujarat	19 February 1970	(Note: CJ of Himachal Pradesh High Court transferred as CJ of Calcutta and subsequently transferred as CJ to Bombay High Court)
26	Nagendra Prasad Singh		4 February 1991	14 June 1992	1 year, 132 days	Patna	12 April 1973	
27	Anandamoy Bhattacharjee		25 January 1993	20 April 1994	1 year, 86 days	Sikkim	16 June 1976	(Note: He became ACJ on 15 June 1992 and served till 24 January 1993 for 224 days before becoming permanent Chief Justice and later transferred as CJ to Bombay High Court)
28	Krishna Chandra Agarwal		21 April 1994	15 January 1996	1 year, 270 days	Allahabad	6 August 1973	(Note: CJ of Rajasthan High Court transferred as CJ of Calcutta)
29 Expand	Vishweshwar Nath Khare	V. N. Khare	2 February 1996	20 March 1997	1 year, 47 days	Allahabad	25 June 1983	
--	Samir Kumar Mookherjee		21 March 1997	27 October 1997	221 days	Calcutta	9 January 1984	
30 Expand	Prabha Shankar Mishra		28 October 1997	15 July 1998^{[‡]}	261 days	Patna	18 November 1982	(Note: CJ of Undivided Andhra Pradesh High Court transferred as CJ of Calcutta)
--	Samir Kumar Mookherjee		15 July 1998	29 April 1999	289 days	Calcutta	9 January 1984	(Note: Retired as ACJ)
--	S. K. Sen		29 April 1999	17 May 1999	19 days	Calcutta	17 January 1986	(Note: Appointed as Acting Governor of West Bengal)
--	S. B. Sinha		18 May 1999	4 December 1999	201 days	Patna	9 March 1987	
--	S. K. Sen		5 December 1999	21 December 1999	17 days	Calcutta	17 January 1986	(Note: Reverted from position of Acting Governor to ACJ)
31 Expand	Ashok Kumar Mathur		22 December 1999	6 June 2004	4 years, 168 days	Rajasthan	13 July 1985	(Note: CJ of Madhya Pradesh High Court transferred as CJ of Calcutta)
--	A. N. Ray		7 June 2004	10 January 2005	218 days	Calcutta	6 August 1990	(Note: Elevated as Chief Justice of Allahabad High Court)
--	A. Kabir	Altamas Kabir	11 January 2005	28 February 2005	49 days	Calcutta	6 August 1990	(Note: Elevated as Chief Justice of Jharkhand High Court)
--	A. K. Ganguly		1 March 2005	19 March 2005	19 days	Calcutta	10 January 1994	
32 Expand	Vikas Sridhar Sirpurkar		20 March 2005	11 January 2007	1 year, 298 days	Bombay	9 November 1992	(Note: CJ of Uttarakhand High Court transferred as CJ of Calcutta)
--	B. Bhattacharya		12 January 2007	6 March 2007	54 days	Calcutta	17 July 1997	
33 Expand	Surinder Singh Nijjar		7 March 2007	16 November 2009	2 years, 255 days	Punjab & Haryana	8 April 1996	
--	B. Bhattacharya		17 November 2009	23 December 2009	37 days	Calcutta	17 July 1997	
34	Mohit Shantilal Shah		24 December 2009	25 June 2010	184 days	Gujarat	18 September 1995	
35 Expand	Jai Narayan Patel		26 June 2010	4 October 2012	2 years, 101 days	Bombay	11 March 1996	
--	K. J. Sengupta		5 October 2012	30 October 2012	26 days	Calcutta	17 July 1997	(Note: Transferred as Judge to Uttarakhand High Court)
--	Pratap Kumar Ray		31 October 2012	14 December 2012	45 days	Calcutta	15 September 2000	
36 Expand	Arun Mishra		14 December 2012	6 July 2014	1 year, 205 days	Madhya Pradesh	25 October 1999	
--	Ashim Kumar Banerjee		7 July 2014	5 August 2014	30 days	Calcutta	15 September 2000	
37	Manjula Chellur		6 August 2014	21 August 2016	2 years, 16 days	Karnataka	21 February 2000	(Note: CJ of Kerala High Court transferred as CJ of Calcutta and subsequently transferred as CJ to Bombay High Court)
38 Expand	Girish Chandra Gupta		21 September 2016	30 November 2016	71 days	Calcutta	15 September 2000	(Note: He became ACJ on 22 August 2016 and served till 20 September 2016 for 30 days before becoming permanent Chief Justice)
--	N. N. Mhatre		1 December 2016	19 September 2017	293 days	Bombay	28 March 2001	
--	Rakesh Tiwari		20 September 2017	24 October 2017	35 days	Allahabad	14 February 2002	
39	Jyotirmay Bhattacharya		1 May 2018	24 September 2018	147 days	Calcutta	3 December 2003	(Note: He became ACJ on 25 October 2017 and served till 30 April 2018 for 188 days before becoming permanent Chief Justice)
40 Expand	Debasish Kar Gupta		30 October 2018	31 December 2018	63 days	Calcutta	22 June 2006	(Note: He became ACJ on 25 September 2018 and served till 29 October 2018 for 35 days before becoming permanent Chief Justice)
--	Biswanath Somadder		1 January 2019	3 April 2019	93 days	Calcutta	22 June 2006	
41 Expand	Thottathil Bhaskaran Nair Radhakrishnan		4 April 2019	28 April 2021	2 years, 25 days	Kerala	14 October 2004	(Note: CJ of Telangana High Court transferred as CJ of Calcutta)
--	Rajesh Bindal		28 April 2021	10 October 2021	166 days	Punjab & Haryana	22 March 2006	
42	Prakash Shrivastava		11 October 2021	30 March 2023	1 year, 171 days	Madhya Pradesh	18 January 2008	
43 Expand	Tirunelveli Subbiah Sivagnanam		11 May 2023	15 September 2025	2 years, 128 days	Madras	31 March 2009	(Note: He became ACJ on 31 March 2023 and served till 10 May 2023 for 41 days before becoming permanent Chief Justice)
--	Soumen Sen		16 September 2025	7 October 2025	22 days	Calcutta	13 April 2011	(Note: Elevated as Chief Justice of Meghalaya High Court)
44 Expand	Sujoy Paul		16 January 2026	20 June 2026	156 days	Madhya Pradesh	27 May 2011	(Note: He became ACJ on 8 October 2025 and served till 15 January 2026 for 100 days before becoming permanent Chief Justice)
--	T. Chakraborty		21 June 2026	8 September 2026	80 days	Calcutta	30 October 2013	

== Chhattisgarh High Court ==
The Chhattisgarh High Court was established on 1 November 2000 under the Madhya Pradesh Reorganisation Act, 2000 and has had 15 permanent Chief Justices and several Acting Chief Justices.

# Expand	Name	Portrait	Date of Appointment	Date of Retirement	Tenure	Parent High Court	Date of initial Appointment	Notes
--	R. S. Garg		1 November 2000	4 December 2000	34 days	Madhya Pradesh	15 December 1994	(Note: Garg was serving as Judge of Madhya Pradesh High Court when he was transferred as ACJ upon creation of Chhattisgarh High Court)
1 Expand	Wungazan Awungshi Shishak		5 December 2000	15 January 2002	1 year, 42 days	Gauhati	2 January 1989	(Note: Transferred to Himachal Pradesh High Court)
--	Fakhruddin		16 January 2002	5 February 2002	21 days	Madhya Pradesh	15 December 1994	
2 Expand	Korategere Hanumanthayya Narasimha Kuranga		6 February 2002	10 May 2004	2 years, 95 days	Karnataka	22 February 1993	
--	Fakhruddin		11 May 2004	27 May 2004	17 days	Madhya Pradesh	15 December 1994	
3 Expand	Ayyampalayam Somasundaram Venkatachala Moorthy		28 May 2004	7 January 2005	225 days	Madras	17 October 1994	
--	Fakhruddin		8 January 2005	13 March 2005	65 days	Madhya Pradesh	15 December 1994	
4 Expand	Ananga Kumar Patnaik		14 March 2005	1 October 2005	202 days	Orissa	13 January 1994	(Note: Transferred to Madhya Pradesh High Court)
--	Fakhruddin		2 October 2005	16 November 2005	46 days	Madhya Pradesh	15 December 1994	
5 Expand	Subray Rama Nayak		17 November 2005	31 December 2006	1 year, 45 days	Karnataka	25 February 1994	
--	L. C. Bhadoo		1 January 2007	11 February 2007	42 days	Chhattisgarh	20 January 2003	
6 Expand	Handyala Lakshminarayanaswamy Dattu		12 February 2007	17 May 2007	95 days	Karnataka	18 December 1995	(Note: Transferred to Kerala High Court)
--	Jagadish Bhalla		19 May 2007	1 February 2008	259 days	Allahabad	5 April 1995	(Note: Bhalla was serving as Judge of Allahabad High Court when he was transferred as ACJ and subsequently he was elevated as CJ of Himachal Pradesh High Court on 2 February 2008)
7 Expand	Rajeev Gupta		2 February 2008	9 October 2012	4 years, 251 days	Madhya Pradesh	27 September 1994	(Note: CJ of Uttarakhand High Court transferred as CJ of Chhattisgarh)
--	A. M. Sapre		10 October 2012	21 October 2012	12 days	Madhya Pradesh	25 October 1999	
8	Yatindra Singh		22 October 2012	8 October 2014	1 year, 352 days	Allahabad	5 February 1999	
9	Navin Sinha		9 April 2015	13 May 2016	1 year, 35 days	Patna	11 February 2004	(Note: He became ACJ on 9 October 2014 and served till 8 April 2015 for 159 days before becoming permanent Chief Justice and later transferred as CJ to Rajasthan High Court)
10 Expand	Deepak Gupta		16 May 2016	16 February 2017	277 days	Himachal Pradesh	4 October 2004	(Note: CJ of Tripura High Court transferred as CJ of Chhattisgarh)
--	Pritinker Diwaker		17 February 2017	17 March 2017	29 days	Chhattisgarh	31 March 2009	
11	Thottathil Bhaskaran Nair Radhakrishnan		18 March 2017	6 July 2018	1 year, 111 days	Kerala	14 October 2004	(Note: Transferred to Telangana High Court)
12 Expand	Ajay Kumar Tripathi		7 July 2018	26 March 2019^{[‡]}	263 days	Patna	9 October 2006	
--	P. K. Mishra		27 March 2019	5 May 2019	40 days	Chhattisgarh	10 December 2009	
13 Expand	Parappillil Ramakrishnan Nair Ramachandra Menon		6 May 2019	31 May 2021	2 years, 26 days	Kerala	5 January 2009	
--	P. K. Mishra		1 June 2021	11 October 2021	133 days	Chhattisgarh	10 December 2009	(Note: Elevated as Chief Justice of Andhra Pradesh High Court)
14 Expand	Arup Kumar Goswami		12 October 2021	10 March 2023	1 year, 150 days	Gauhati	24 January 2011	(Note: CJ of Andhra Pradesh High Court transferred as CJ of Chhattisgarh)
--	Goutam Bhaduri		11 March 2023	28 March 2023	18 days	Chhattisgarh	16 September 2013	
15 Expand	Ramesh Sinha		29 March 2023	4 September 2026	3 years, 160 days	Allahabad	21 November 2011	
--	S. K. Agrawal		5 September 2026	6 September 2026	2 days	Chhattisgarh	16 September 2013	(Note: Elevated as Chief Justice of Rajasthan High Court)

== Delhi High Court ==
The Delhi High Court was established on 31 October 1966 under Delhi High Court Act, 1966 and has had 34 permanent Chief Justices and several Acting Chief Justices. Website of Delhi State legal services Authority contains list of its former patron in chiefs who always had been the chief justice of Delhi High Court (whether acting or permanent). Thus the list contained in this website would serve as primary reference for acting chief justices after 1990 until 2010 because after 2010 this website only mentions permanent chief justices as Patron-in-Chief.

#	Name	Portrait	Date of Appointment	Date of Retirement	Tenure	Parent High Court	Date of initial Appointment	Notes
1	Kowdoor Sadananda Hegde		31 October 1966	16 July 1967	259 days	Karnataka	26 August 1957	
2	Inder Dev Dua		17 July 1967	31 July 1969	2 years, 15 days	Punjab & Haryana	11 August 1958	
3	Hans Raj Khanna		1 August 1969	22 September 1971	2 years, 53 days	Punjab & Haryana	7 May 1962	
4	Hardayal Hardy		23 September 1971	14 May 1972	235 days	Delhi	4 January 1967	
5	Narain Andley		15 May 1972	3 June 1974	2 years, 20 days	Delhi	4 January 1967	
6	Tirumala Venkata Ranga Tatachari		4 June 1974	15 October 1978	4 years, 134 days	Delhi	4 January 1967	
7	Vasant Shamrao Deshpande		16 October 1978	26 June 1980	1 year, 255 days	Delhi	30 April 1968	
8	Prakash Narain		8 January 1981	5 August 1985	4 years, 210 days	Delhi	20 January 1969	(Note: He became ACJ on 27 June 1980 and served till 7 January 1981 for 195 days before becoming permanent Chief Justice)
9	Rajinder Sachar		6 August 1985	21 December 1985	138 days	Delhi	12 February 1970	
10	Dalip Kumar Kapur		22 December 1985	19 August 1986	241 days	Delhi	4 November 1970	
11	Tejinder Pal Singh Chawla		26 September 1986	15 August 1987	324 days	Delhi	6 January 1972	(Note: He became ACJ on 20 August 1986 and served till 25 September 1986 for 37 days before becoming permanent Chief Justice)
12	Rajendra Nath Aggarwal		16 August 1987	21 August 1987	6 days	Delhi	7 March 1972 (Note: Appointed as additional judge for 2 year from 7 March 1972 and thereafter relieved from service and again appointed as permanent judge on 7 July 1977 with restored seniority)	
13 Expand	Yogeshwar Dayal		21 August 1987	18 March 1988	211 days	Delhi	28 February 1974	(Note: Transferred to Undivided Andhra Pradesh High Court)
--	Surjit Singh Chadha		19 March 1988	19 May 1988	62 days	Delhi	18 December 1974	
14 Expand	Rabindranath Pyne		20 May 1988	28 September 1990	2 years, 132 days	Calcutta	6 March 1974	
--	Leila Seth		28 September 1990	27 November 1990	61 days	Delhi	25 July 1978	
15 Expand	Milap Chand Jain		28 November 1990	21 July 1991	236 days	Rajasthan	15 June 1978	
--	Leila Seth		22 July 1991	4 August 1991	14 days	Delhi	25 July 1978	(Note: Elevated as Chief Justice of Himachal Pradesh High Court)
16	Gokal Chand Mittal		5 August 1991	11 April 1994	2 years, 250 days	Punjab & Haryana	19 February 1979	(Note: Transferred to Rajasthan High Court)
17 Expand	Mamidanna Jagannadha Rao		12 April 1994	20 March 1997	2 years, 343 days	Andhra Pradesh	29 November 1982	(Note: CJ of Kerala High Court transferred as CJ of Delhi)
--	Mahinder Narain		21 March 1997	25 June 1997	97 days	Delhi	4 July 1985	
18 Expand	Ajay Prakash Misra		26 June 1997	3 December 1997	161 days	Allahabad	24 May 1984	
--	Mahinder Narain		4 December 1997	18 September 1998	289 days	Delhi	4 July 1985	(Note: Went on leave)
--	Y. K. Sabharwal	Y. K. Sabharwal	19 September 1998	9 December 1998	82 days	Delhi	17 November 1986	
--	Mahinder Narain		10 December 1998	17 January 1999	39 days	Delhi	4 July 1985	(Note: Resumed duty after leave on 10 December 1998 and Again went on leave and subsequently died)
--	Y. K. Sabharwal		18 January 1999	2 February 1999	16 days	Delhi	17 November 1986	(Note: Elevated as Chief Justice of Bombay High Court)
--	Devinder Gupta		3 February 1999	24 May 1999	111 days	Himachal Pradesh	25 June 1990	
19 Expand	Sam Nariman Variava		25 May 1999	14 March 2000	295 days	Bombay	21 November 1986	
--	Devinder Gupta		15 March 2000	9 May 2000	56 days	Himachal Pradesh	25 June 1990	
20 Expand	Arijit Pasayat		10 May 2000	18 October 2001	1 year, 162 days	Orissa	20 March 1989	
--	Devinder Gupta		19 October 2001	25 November 2001	38 days	Himachal Pradesh	25 June 1990	
21 Expand	Satyabrata Sinha		26 November 2001	2 October 2002	311 days	Patna	9 March 1987	(Note: CJ of Undivided Andhra Pradesh High Court transferred as CJ of Delhi)
--	Devinder Gupta		2 October 2002	4 March 2003	154 days	Himachal Pradesh	25 June 1990	(Note: Elevated as Chief Justice of undivided Andhra Pradesh High Court)
22 Expand	Babulal Chandulal Patel		5 March 2003	7 August 2005	2 years, 156 days	Gujarat	21 June 1990	(Note: CJ of Jammu & Kashmir High Court transferred as CJ of Delhi)
--	Bashir Ahmed Khan		8 August 2005	11 October 2005	65 days	Jammu & Kashmir	12 November 1990	(Note: Transferred as ACJ of Jammu & Kashmir High Court)
23 Expand	Markandey Katju		12 October 2005	9 April 2006	180 days	Allahabad	30 November 1991	(Note: CJ of Madras High Court transferred as CJ of Delhi)
--	Vijender Jain		10 April 2006	27 November 2006	232 days	Delhi	24 December 1992	(Note: Elevated as Chief Justice of Punjab & Haryana High Court)
24 Expand	Mukundakam Sharma		4 December 2006	8 April 2008	1 year, 127 days	Gauhati	10 January 1994	(Note: He became ACJ on 28 November 2006 and served till 3 December 2006 for 6 days before becoming permanent Chief Justice and later elevated to Supreme Court of India)
--	T. S. Thakur		9 April 2008	10 May 2008	32 days	Jammu & Kashmir	16 February 1994	
25 Expand	Ajit Prakash Shah		11 May 2008	12 February 2010	1 year, 278 days	Bombay	18 December 1992	
--	M. B. Lokur		13 February 2010	23 May 2010	100 days	Delhi	19 February 1999	
26 Expand	Dipak Misra		24 May 2010	9 October 2011	1 year, 139 days	Orissa	17 January 1996	(Note: CJ of Patna High Court transferred as CJ of Delhi)
--	A. K. Sikri		10 October 2011	22 September 2012	349 days	Delhi	7 July 1999	
--	S. K. Kaul		23 September 2012	25 September 2012	3 days	Delhi	3 May 2001	
27 Expand	Darmar Murugesan		26 September 2012	10 June 2013	258 days	Madras	2 March 2000	
--	B. D. Ahmed		11 June 2013	1 September 2013	83 days	Delhi	20 December 2002	
28 Expand	Nuthalapati Venkata Ramana		2 September 2013	16 February 2014	168 days	Andhra Pradesh	27 June 2000	
--	B. D. Ahmed		17 February 2014	20 April 2014	63 days	Delhi	20 December 2002	
29 Expand	Gorla Rohini		21 April 2014	13 April 2017	2 years, 358 days	Andhra Pradesh	25 June 2001	
--	Gita Mittal		14 April 2017	8 August 2018	1 year, 117 days	Delhi	16 July 2004	(Note: Elevated as Chief Justice of Jammu & Kashmir High Court)
30	Rajendra Menon		9 August 2018	6 June 2019	302 days	Madhya Pradesh	1 April 2002	
31 Expand	Dhirubhai Naranbhai Patel		7 June 2019	12 March 2022	2 years, 279 days	Gujarat	7 March 2004	
--	Vipin Sanghi		13 March 2022	27 June 2022	107 days	Delhi	29 May 2006	(Note: Elevated as Chief Justice of Uttarakhand High Court)
32	Satish Chandra Sharma		28 June 2022	8 November 2023	1 year, 134 days	Madhya Pradesh	18 January 2008	(Note: CJ of Telangana High Court transferred as CJ of Delhi)
33 Expand	Manmohan		29 September 2024	4 December 2024	67 days	Delhi	13 March 2008	(Note: He became ACJ on 9 November 2023 and served till 28 September 2024 for 325 days before becoming permanent Chief Justice and later elevated to Supreme Court of India)
--	Vibhu Bakhru		5 December 2024	20 January 2025	47 days	Delhi	17 April 2013	
34	Devendra Kumar Upadhyaya		21 January 2025	5 October 2026	1 year, 258 days	Allahabad	21 November 2011	

== Gauhati High Court ==
The Gauhati High Court was established on 1 March 1948 under the Government of India Act 1935 and has had 42 permanent Chief Justices and several Acting Chief Justices.

#	Name	Portrait	Date of Appointment	Date of Retirement	Tenure	Parent High Court	Date of initial Appointment	Notes & References
1	Ronald Francis Lodge		5 April 1948	7 April 1949^{[‡]}	1 year, 3 days	Calcutta	17 November 1938	
2 Expand	Thakurdas Vasanmal Thadani		28 May 1951	21 November 1952	1 year, 178 days	Gauhati (Note: Appointed as judge in Sindh High Court but resigned after partition and re appointed as judge of Assam High Court in 1948)	1948	(Note: He became ACJ on 8 April 1949 and served till 27 May 1951 for 2 years, 50 days before becoming permanent Chief Justice)
--	Ram Labhaya		22 November 1952	9 February 1953	80 days	Gauhati	3 January 1949	
3	Sarjoo Prasad		10 February 1953	20 February 1959	6 years, 11 days	Patna	13 January 1950	(Note: Transferred to Rajasthan High Court)
4	Chandreswar Prasad Sinha		21 February 1959	31 January 1961	1 year, 346 days	Patna	16 June 1950	
5	Holiram Deka		1 February 1961	29 June 1961	149 days	Gauhati	5 June 1951	
6	Gopalji Mehrotra		30 June 1961	6 February 1967	5 years, 222 days	Allahabad	6 May 1954	
7	Canakapalli Sanjeevrow Nayudu		7 February 1967	7 March 1968	1 year, 30 days	Andhra Pradesh	13 March 1958	
8	Sarat Kumar Dutta		8 March 1968	30 January 1970	1 year, 329 days	Gauhati	25 February 1961	
9	Parbati Kumar Goswami		31 January 1970	9 September 1973	3 years, 222 days	Gauhati	12 May 1967	
10	Mahendra Chandra Pathak		9 January 1974	30 June 1977	3 years, 173 days	Gauhati	23 August 1967	(Note: He became ACJ on 10 September 1973 and served till 8 January 1974 for 121 days before becoming permanent Chief Justice)
11	Mahadevayya Sadanand Swami		1 October 1977	5 July 1978	278 days	Karnataka	2 June 1967	(Note: He became ACJ on 1 July 1977 and served till 30 September 1977 for 92 days before becoming permanent Chief Justice)
12	Chand Mal Lodha		6 July 1978	10 March 1979	248 days	Rajasthan	22 November 1967	
13	Baharul Islam		7 July 1979	1 March 1980	239 days	Gauhati	20 January 1972	(Note: He became ACJ on 11 March 1979 and served till 6 July 1979 for 118 days before becoming permanent Chief Justice and later Elevated to Supreme Court of India on 4 December 1980 after retiring as High Court Judge on 1 March 1980)
14	Dambarudhar Pathak		18 April 1983	8 August 1983	113 days	Gauhati	8 August 1973	(Note: He became ACJ on 2 March 1980 and served till 17 April 1983 for 3 years, 47 days before becoming permanent Chief Justice and later transferred as CJ to Orissa High Court)
15 Expand	Tribeni Sahai Misra		12 August 1983	14 November 1984	1 year, 95 days	Allahabad	3 September 1971	
--	Kiranmoy Lahiri		15 November 1984	29 September 1985	319 days	Gauhati	19 November 1975	
16	Palem Chennakesava Reddy		30 September 1985	2 November 1986	1 year, 34 days	Andhra Pradesh	10 May 1972	(Note: CJ of Undivided Andhra Pradesh High Court transferred as CJ of Gauhati)
17	Kiranmoy Lahiri		3 November 1986	19 December 1986	47 days	Gauhati	19 November 1975	
18	Khagendra Nath Saikia		14 June 1987	29 February 1988	261 days	Gauhati	12 February 1979	(Note: He became ACJ on 20 December 1986 and served till 13 June 1987 for 176 days before becoming permanent Chief Justice and later Elevated to Supreme Court of India on 14 December 1988 after retiring as High Court Judge on 29 February 1988)
19 Expand	Guman Mal Lodha		1 March 1988	15 March 1988	15 days	Rajasthan	1 May 1978	
--	B. L. Hansaria		16 March 1988	5 May 1988	51 days	Gauhati	12 February 1979	
20 Expand	Anisetti Raghuvir		6 May 1988	21 March 1991	2 years, 320 days	Andhra Pradesh	17 October 1974	
--	Shafiqul Haque		22 March 1991	19 August 1991	151 days	Gauhati	10 January 1984	
21	Ullal Lakshminarayana Bhat		20 August 1991	12 December 1993	2 years, 115 days	Kerala	18 September 1980	(Note: Transferred to Madhya Pradesh High Court)
22 Expand	Rajkumar Manisana Singh		27 January 1994	1 February 1994	6 days	Gauhati	21 November 1984	(Note: He became ACJ on 12 December 1993 and served till 26 January 1994 for 46 days before becoming permanent Chief Justice)
--	S. N. Phukan		2 February 1994	23 April 1994	81 days	Gauhati	11 October 1985	
23 Expand	Viney Krishna Khanna		24 April 1994	14 February 1997	2 years, 297 days	Allahabad	2 July 1979	
--	Virendra Dutt Gyani		15 February 1997	17 June 1997	122 days	Madhya Pradesh	14 May 1984	
24 Expand	Muniyallapa Ramakrishna		18 June 1997	12 April 1998	299 days	Karnataka	10 January 1983	(Note: CJ of Jammu & Kashmir High Court transferred as CJ of Guahati)
--	Virendra Dutt Gyani		13 April 1998	29 July 1998	108 days	Madhya Pradesh	14 May 1984	(Note: Retired as ACJ)
--	Naresh Chandra Jain		30 July 1998	11 February 1999	197 days	Punjab & Haryana	27 June 1988	
25	Brijesh Kumar		12 February 1999	18 October 2000	1 year, 250 days	Allahabad	24 May 1984	
26 Expand	Naresh Chandra Jain		19 October 2000	5 April 2001	169 days	Punjab & Haryana	27 June 1988	
--	H. K. Sema		5 April 2001	6 June 2001	63 days	Gauhati	24 May 1989	(Note: Transferred as Judge to Jammu & Kashmir High Court)
27	Ravinder Singh Mongia		21 September 2001	9 June 2002	262 days	Punjab & Haryana	15 June 1990	(Note: He became ACJ on 12 June 2001 and served till 20 September 2001 for 101 days before becoming permanent Chief Justice)
28 Expand	Prakash Prabhakar Naolekar		10 June 2002	26 August 2004	2 years, 78 days	Madhya Pradesh	15 June 1992	
--	Dinendra Biswas		27 August 2004	20 May 2005	267 days	Gauhati	31 October 1997	
29 Expand	Binod Kumar Roy		21 May 2005	29 September 2005	132 days	Patna	31 October 1988	(Note: CJ of Punjab & Haryana High Court transferred as CJ of Gauhati and subsequently transferred as CJ to Sikkim High Court)
--	Dinendra Biswas		30 September 2005	4 December 2005	66 days	Gauhati	31 October 1997	
30 Expand	Buchireddy Sudershan Reddy		5 December 2005	11 January 2007	1 year, 38 days	Andhra Pradesh	2 May 1995	
--	Dinendra Biswas		12 January 2007	2 May 2007	111 days	Gauhati	31 October 1997	
31 Expand	Jasti Chelameswar		3 May 2007	16 March 2010	2 years, 318 days	Andhra Pradesh	23 June 1997	(Note: Transferred to Kerala High Court)
--	Ranjan Gogoi	Ranjan Gogoi	17 March 2010	16 April 2010	31 days	Gauhati	28 February 2001	
32 Expand	Ramesh Surajmal Garg		17 April 2010	18 June 2010	63 days	Madhya Pradesh	15 December 1994	
--	Ranjan Gogoi		18 June 2010	23 June 2010	6 days	Gauhati	28 February 2001	
33	Madan Lokur		24 June 2010	14 November 2011	1 year, 145 days	Delhi	19 February 1999	(Note: Transferred to Undivided Andhra Pradesh High Court)
34	Adarsh Kumar Goel		20 December 2011	11 October 2013	1 year, 296 days	Punjab & Haryana	2 July 2001	(Note: He became ACJ on 15 November 2011 and served till 19 December 2011 for 35 days before becoming permanent Chief Justice and later transferred as CJ to Orissa High Court)
35 Expand	Abhay Manohar Sapre		19 October 2013	12 August 2014	298 days	Madhya Pradesh	25 October 1999	(Note: CJ of Manipur High Court transferred as CJ of Gauhati)
--	Karanam Sreedhar Rao		13 August 2014	20 October 2015	1 year, 69 days	Karnataka	21 February 2000	
--	T. Vaiphei		21 October 2015	4 March 2016	136 days	Gauhati	17 July 2003	
36 Expand	Ajit Singh		5 March 2016	5 September 2018	2 years, 185 days	Madhya Pradesh	1 April 2002	
--	A. K. Goswami		6 September 2018	28 October 2018	53 days	Gauhati	24 January 2011	
37 Expand	Ajjikuttira Somaiah Bopanna		29 October 2018	23 May 2019	207 days	Karnataka	6 January 2006	
--	A. K. Goswami		24 May 2019	6 October 2019	136 days	Gauhati	24 January 2011	
38 Expand	Ajai Lamba		7 October 2019	20 September 2020	350 days	Punjab & Haryana	22 March 2006	
--	N. Kotiswar Singh		21 September 2020	9 January 2021	111 days	Manipur	17 October 2011	
39 Expand	Sudhanshu Dhulia		10 January 2021	8 May 2022	1 year, 119 days	Uttarakhand	1 November 2008	
--	N. Kotiswar Singh		9 May 2022	22 June 2022	45 days	Manipur	17 October 2011	
40 Expand	Rashmin Manharbhai Chhaya		23 June 2022	11 January 2023	203 days	Gujarat	17 February 2011	
--	N. Kotiswar Singh		12 January 2023	14 February 2023	34 days	Manipur	17 October 2011	(Note: Elevated as Chief Justice of Jammu & Kashmir High Court)
41 Expand	Sandeep Mehta		15 February 2023	8 November 2023	267 days	Rajasthan	30 May 2011	
--	L. Jamir		9 November 2023	4 February 2024	88 days	Gauhati	22 May 2013	
42 Expand	Vijay Bishnoi		5 February 2024	29 May 2025	1 year, 114 days	Rajasthan	8 January 2013	
--	L. Jamir		30 May 2025	20 July 2025	52 days	Gauhati	22 May 2013	(Note: Transferred as Judge to Calcutta High Court)

== Gujarat High Court ==
The Gujarat High Court was established on 1 May 1960 under the Bombay Reorganisation Act, 1960 and has had 28 permanent Chief Justices and several Acting Chief Justices. 2022 Annual report of Gujarat High Court contains list of all former acting chief justices till the time of publishing report.

#	Name	Portrait	Date of Appointment	Date of Retirement	Tenure	Parent High Court	Date of initial Appointment	Notes
1	Sunderlal Trikamlal Desai		1 May 1960	25 January 1961	270 days	Bombay	9 October 1952	
2	Kantilal Thakoredas Desai		26 January 1961	22 May 1963	2 years, 117 days	Bombay	6 January 1957	
3	Jaishanker Manilal Shelat		31 May 1963	23 February 1966	2 years, 269 days	Bombay	6 January 1957	(Note: He became ACJ on 23 May 1963 and served till 30 May 1963 for 8 days before becoming permanent Chief Justice and later elevated to Supreme Court of India)
4	Nomanbhai Mahmedbhai Miabhoy		21 April 1966	5 September 1967	1 year, 138 days	Bombay	22 March 1957	(Note: He became ACJ on 24 February 1966 and served till 20 April 1966 for 126 days before becoming permanent Chief Justice)
5	Prafullachandra Natwarlal Bhagwati		16 September 1967	17 July 1973	5 years, 305 days	Gujarat	21 July 1960	
6 Expand	Bipinchandra Jivanlal Diwan		18 July 1973	29 June 1976	2 years, 348 days	Gujarat	19 April 1962	(Note: Transferred to Undivided Andhra Pradesh High Court)
--	Jayantilal Bapalal Mehta		30 June 1976	6 July 1976	7 days	Gujarat	5 August 1963	
7 Expand	Seshareddi Obul Reddy		7 July 1976	18 August 1977	1 year, 43 days	Andhra Pradesh	8 July 1966	(Note: CJ of Undivided Andhra Pradesh High Court transferred as CJ of Gujarat and subsequently transferred back to the same High Court)
--	Jayantilal Bapalal Mehta		19 August 1977	27 August 1977	9 days	Gujarat	5 August 1963	
(6)	Bipinchandra Jivanlal Diwan		28 August 1977	19 August 1981	3 years, 357 days	Gujarat	19 April 1962	(Note: CJ of Undivided Andhra Pradesh High Court transferred as CJ of Gujarat)
8 Expand	Manharlal Pranlal Thakkar		20 August 1981	14 March 1983	1 year, 207 days	Gujarat	2 July 1969	
--	P. D. Desai		15 March 1983	27 September 1983	197 days	Gujarat	19 February 1970	
9 Expand	Padmanabham Subramanian Poti		28 September 1983	1 February 1985	1 year, 127 days	Kerala	20 March 1969	(Note: CJ of Kerala High Court transferred as CJ of Gujarat)
--	Batukumar Kantiprasad Mehta		2 February 1985	20 March 1985	47 days	Gujarat	19 February 1970	
10 Expand	Puliyangudi Ramaiyapillai Gokulakrishnan		21 March 1985	12 August 1990	5 years, 145 days	Madras	11 July 1969	
--	Rameshkumar Chunilal Mankad		13 August 1990	1 December 1990	111 days	Gujarat	28 December 1977	
11 Expand	Ganendra Narayan Ray		2 December 1990	6 October 1991	309 days	Calcutta	23 December 1976	
--	Rameshkumar Chunilal Mankad		7 October 1991	18 February 1992	135 days	Gujarat	28 December 1977	(Note: Retired as ACJ)
--	Shailesh Bhadrayulal Majmudar		19 February 1992	14 June 1992	117 days	Gujarat	3 October 1978	
12	Sundaram Nainar Sundaram		15 June 1992	13 December 1993	1 year, 182 days	Madras	4 January 1978	
13 Expand	Bhupinder Nath Kirpal		14 December 1993	10 September 1995	1 year, 272 days	Delhi	20 November 1979	
--	R. A. Mehta		11 September 1995	1 July 1996	294 days	Gujarat	5 September 1983	
14 Expand	Gurudas Datta Kamat		2 July 1996	4 January 1997	187 days	Bombay	29 August 1983	
--	R. A. Mehta		5 January 1997	19 October 1997	288 days	Gujarat	5 September 1983	
15	Kumaran Sreedharan		20 October 1997	3 June 1998	227 days	Kerala	10 September 1985	(Note: CJ of Punjab & Haryana High Court transferred as CJ of Gujarat)
16 Expand	Konakuppakattil Gopinathan Balakrishnan		16 July 1998	8 September 1999	1 year, 55 days	Kerala	26 September 1985	(Note: He became ACJ on 4 June 1998 and served till 15 July 1998 for 42 days before becoming permanent Chief Justice and later transferred as CJ to Madras High Court)
--	C. K. Thakker		9 September 1999	24 January 2000	138 days	Gujarat	21 June 1990	
17 Expand	Devdatta Madhav Dharmadhikari		25 January 2000	4 March 2002	2 years, 39 days	Madhya Pradesh	24 March 1989	
--	B. C. Patel		5 March 2002	16 March 2002	12 days	Gujarat	21 June 1990	
18 Expand	Daya Saran Sinha		17 March 2002	17 March 2003	1 year, 1 day	Allahabad	17 March 1986	
--	J. N. Bhatt		18 March 2003	24 August 2003	160 days	Gujarat	21 June 1990	
19 Expand	Bhawani Singh		25 August 2003	28 March 2006	2 years, 216 days	Himachal Pradesh	16 December 1988	(Note: CJ of Madhya Pradesh High Court transferred as CJ of Gujarat)
--	Behram Jahanbux Shethna		28 March 2006	2 April 2006	6 days	Gujarat	22 November 1990	
20 Expand	Yad Ram Meena		3 February 2007	30 June 2008	1 year, 149 days	Rajasthan	20 July 1990	(Note: Meena was serving as Judge of Rajasthan High Court when he was transferred as ACJ and served as such from 3 April 2006 to 2 February 2007 for 306 days before becoming permanent Chief Justice)
--	M. S. Shah		1 July 2008	3 September 2008	65 days	Gujarat	18 September 1995	
21 Expand	Kalavamkodath Sivasankara Panicker Radhakrishnan		4 September 2008	16 November 2009	1 year, 74 days	Kerala	17 May 1995	(Note: CJ of Jammu & Kashmir High Court transferred as CJ of Gujarat)
--	M. S. Shah		16 November 2009	8 December 2009	23 days	Gujarat	18 September 1995	
22 Expand	Sudhanshu Joshi Mukhopadhaya		9 December 2009	12 September 2011	1 year, 278 days	Patna	8 November 1994	
--	Ashokkumar Laxminarayan Dave		13 September 2011	7 November 2011	56 days	Gujarat	11 December 1997	
23 Expand	Bhaskar Bhattacharya		21 July 2012	28 September 2014	2 years, 70 days	Calcutta	17 July 1997	(Note: Bhattacharya was serving as Judge of Calcutta High Court when he was transferred as ACJ and served as such from 8 November 2011 to 20 July 2012 for 256 days before becoming permanent Chief Justice)
--	Vijay Manohar Sahai		29 September 2014	12 August 2015	318 days	Allahabad	5 February 1999	
--	Jayant Maganlal Patel		13 August 2015	12 February 2016	184 days	Gujarat	3 December 2001	(Note: Transferred as Judge to Karnataka High Court)
24 Expand	Ramayyagari Subhash Reddy		13 February 2016	1 November 2018	2 years, 262 days	Andhra Pradesh	2 December 2002	
--	A. A. Kureshi		2 November 2018	13 November 2018	12 days	Gujarat	7 March 2004	(Note: Transferred as Judge to Bombay High Court)
--	A. S. Dave		14 November 2018	9 September 2019	300 days	Gujarat	8 October 2004	
25 Expand	Vikram Nath		10 September 2019	30 August 2021	1 year, 355 days	Allahabad	24 September 2004	
--	Vineet Kothari		31 August 2021	2 September 2021	3 days	Rajasthan	13 June 2005	
--	R. M. Chhaya		2 September 2021	12 October 2021	41 days	Gujarat	17 February 2011	
26	Aravind Kumar		13 October 2021	12 February 2023	1 year, 123 days	Karnataka	26 June 2009	
27 Expand	Sonia Giridhar Gokani		16 February 2023	25 February 2023	10 days	Gujarat	17 February 2011	(Note: She became ACJ on 13 February 2023 and served till 15 February 2023 for 3 days before becoming permanent Chief Justice)
--	A. J. Desai		26 February 2023	22 July 2023	147 days	Gujarat	21 November 2011	(Note: Elevated as Chief Justice of Kerala High Court)
28	Sunita Agarwal		23 July 2023	5 October 2026	3 years, 75 days	Allahabad	21 November 2011	

== Himachal Pradesh High Court ==
The Himachal Pradesh High Court was established on 25 January 1971 under the State of Himachal Pradesh Act, 1970 and has had 29 permanent Chief Justices and several Acting Chief Justices.

#	Name	Portrait	Date of Appointment	Date of Retirement	Tenure	Parent High Court	Date of initial Appointment	Notes
1 Expand	Mirza Hameedullah Beg		25 January 1971	9 December 1971	319 days	Allahabad	11 June 1963	
--	Dhruva Bihari Lal		10 December 1971	17 March 1972	99 days	Himachal Pradesh	11 March 1971	
2	Raghunandan Swarup Pathak		18 March 1972	19 February 1978	5 years, 339 days	Allahabad	1 October 1962	
3	Tryambkalal Umedchand Mehta		25 July 1978	11 December 1979	1 year, 140 days	Gujarat	17 November 1969	(Note: He became ACJ on 20 February 1978 and served till 24 July 1978 for 155 days before becoming permanent Chief Justice)
4 Expand	Vyas Dev Misra		12 December 1979	30 September 1983	3 years, 293 days	Delhi	30 July 1969	
--	Hira Singh Thakur		1 October 1983	22 December 1983	83 days	Himachal Pradesh	5 January 1979	
5 Expand	Prabodh Dinkarrao Desai		23 December 1983	13 November 1988	4 years, 327 days	Gujarat	19 February 1970	(Note: Transferred to Calcutta High Court)
--	Vijaya Kumar Mehrotra		14 November 1988	28 March 1989	135 days	Allahabad	30 March 1978	
6 Expand	Narendra Mohan Kasliwal		29 March 1989	5 October 1989	191 days	Rajasthan	15 June 1978	
--	Vijaya Kumar Mehrotra		6 October 1989	5 November 1989	31 days	Allahabad	30 March 1978	
7 Expand	Perumbulavil Chakkala Valappil Balakrishna Menon		6 November 1989	14 January 1991	1 year, 70 days	Kerala	18 September 1980	
--	Vijaya Kumar Mehrotra		15 January 1991	4 August 1991	202 days	Allahabad	30 March 1978	
8 Expand	Leila Seth		5 August 1991	19 October 1992	1 year, 76 days	Delhi	25 July 1978	
--	Bhawani Singh		20 October 1992	21 June 1993	245 days	Himachal Pradesh	16 December 1988	
9 Expand	Shashi Kant Seth		22 June 1993	27 August 1993	67 days	Madhya Pradesh	27 November 1978	
--	Bhawani Singh		28 August 1993	28 January 1994	154 days	Himachal Pradesh	16 December 1988	
10 Expand	Viswanathan Ratnam		29 January 1994	31 July 1994	184 days	Madras	25 January 1979	
--	Bhawani Singh		1 August 1994	16 September 1994	47 days	Himachal Pradesh	16 December 1988	
11	Gulab Chand Gupta		17 September 1994	28 February 1995	165 days	Madhya Pradesh	20 June 1983	
12 Expand	Sailendu Nath Phukan		1 March 1995	1 August 1996	1 year, 154 days	Gauhati	11 October 1985	(Note: Transferred to Orissa High Court)
--	Kamlesh Sharma		2 August 1996	11 August 1996	10 days	Himachal Pradesh	25 June 1990	
13 Expand	Madhavachari Srinivasan		12 August 1996	24 September 1997	1 year, 44 days	Madras	2 June 1986	
--	Kamlesh Sharma		25 September 1997	6 November 1997	43 days	Himachal Pradesh	25 June 1990	
14 Expand	Makani Narayana Rao		6 November 1997	21 April 1998	167 days	Andhra Pradesh	11 July 1986	
--	Kamlesh Sharma		22 April 1998	30 June 1998	70 days	Himachal Pradesh	25 June 1990	
15 Expand	Doraiswamy Raju		1 July 1998	28 January 2000	1 year, 212 days	Madras	14 January 1990	
--	Kamlesh Sharma		29 January 2000	4 May 2000	97 days	Himachal Pradesh	25 June 1990	
16 Expand	Chunilal Karsandas Thakker		5 May 2000	30 December 2001	1 year, 240 days	Gujarat	21 June 1990	(Note: Transferred to Bombay High Court)
--	Kamlesh Sharma		31 December 2001	24 January 2002	25 days	Himachal Pradesh	25 June 1990	
17 Expand	Wungazan Awungshi Shishak		24 January 2002	31 December 2002	342 days	Gauhati	2 January 1989	(Note: CJ of Chhattisgarh High Court transferred as CJ of Himachal Pradesh)
--	Kamlesh Sharma		1 January 2003	7 March 2003	66 days	Himachal Pradesh	25 June 1990	
18	Vinod Kumar Gupta		8 March 2003	1 February 2008	4 years, 331 days	Jammu & Kashmir	7 November 1990	(Note: CJ of Jharkhand High Court transferred as CJ of Himachal Pradesh and subsequently transferred as CJ to Uttarakhand High Court)
19 Expand	Jagadish Bhalla		2 February 2008	9 August 2009	1 year, 189 days	Allahabad	5 April 1995	(Note: Transferred to Rajasthan High Court)
--	Ram Bhawan Misra		10 August 2009	8 February 2010	183 days	Allahabad	24 April 2001	
20 Expand	Kurian Joseph		8 February 2010	7 March 2013	3 years, 28 days	Kerala	12 July 2000	
--	Ram Bhawan Misra		8 March 2013	3 April 2013	27 days	Allahabad	24 April 2001	
21 Expand	Ajay Manikrao Khanwilkar		4 April 2013	24 November 2013	235 days	Bombay	29 March 2000	(Note: Transferred to Madhya Pradesh High Court)
--	Dev Darshan Sud		24 November 2013	26 November 2013	3 days	Himachal Pradesh	27 November 2006	
22 Expand	Mansoor Ahmad Mir		18 June 2014	24 April 2017	2 years, 311 days	Jammu & Kashmir	31 January 2005	(Note: Mir was serving as Judge of Jammu & Kashmir High Court when he was transferred as ACJ and served as such from 27 November 2013 to 17 June 2014 for 203 days before becoming permanent Chief Justice)
--	Sanjay Karol		25 April 2017	5 October 2018	1 year, 164 days	Himachal Pradesh	8 March 2007	
23 Expand	Surya Kant		5 October 2018	23 May 2019	231 days	Punjab & Haryana	9 January 2004	
--	D. C. Chaudhary		24 May 2019	21 June 2019	29 days	Himachal Pradesh	21 January 2012	
24 Expand	V. Ramasubramanian		22 June 2019	22 September 2019	93 days	Madras	31 July 2006	
--	D. C. Chaudhary		23 September 2019	5 October 2019	13 days	Himachal Pradesh	21 January 2012	
25 Expand	Lingappa Narayana Swamy		6 October 2019	30 June 2021	1 year, 268 days	Karnataka	4 July 2007	
--	Ravi Malimath		1 July 2021	13 October 2021	105 days	Karnataka	18 February 2008	(Note: Elevated as Chief Justice of Madhya Pradesh High Court)
26 Expand	Mohammad Rafiq		14 October 2021	24 May 2022	134 days	Rajasthan	15 May 2006	(Note: CJ of Madhya Pradesh High Court transferred as CJ of Himachal Pradesh)
--	Sabina		25 May 2022	22 June 2022	29 days	Punjab & Haryana	12 March 2008	
27 Expand	Amjad Ahtesham Sayed		23 June 2022	20 January 2023	212 days	Bombay	11 April 2007	
--	Sabina		21 January 2023	19 April 2023	89 days	Punjab & Haryana	12 March 2008	(Note: Retired as ACJ)
--	T. S. Chauhan		20 April 2023	29 May 2023	40 days	Himachal Pradesh	23 February 2014	
28	Mamidanna Satyratna Ramachandra Rao		30 May 2023	24 September 2024	1 year, 118 days	Telangana	29 June 2012	(Note: Transferred to Jharkhand High Court)
29 Expand	Rajiv Shakdher		25 September 2024	18 October 2024	24 days	Delhi	11 April 2008	
--	T. S. Chauhan		19 October 2024	28 December 2024	71 days	Himachal Pradesh	23 February 2014	

== Jammu and Kashmir and Ladakh High Court ==
The Jammu and Kashmir and Ladakh High Court was established on 26 March 1928 under Letters Patent issued by then Maharaja of Kashmir, Jammu and Kashmir Reorganisation Act, 2019 and has had 38 permanent Chief Justices and several Acting Chief Justices.

#	Name	Portrait	Date of Appointment	Date of Retirement	Tenure	Parent High Court	Date of initial Appointment	Notes
1	Lala Kanwar Sain		27 April 1928	15 February 1931	2 years, 295 days	Bar	--	
2	Birjor Dalal		16 February 1931	23 November 1936	5 years, 282 days	Allahabad	1925	
3	Abdul Qayoom		24 November 1936	20 July 1940	3 years, 240 days	Bar	--	
4	Rachpal Singh		13 August 1940	6 March 1942	1 year, 206 days	Allahabad	1934	
5	Ganga Nath		24 June 1942	23 October 1945	3 years, 122 days	Allahabad	1937	
6	Sarat Kumar Ghosh		29 March 1946	29 March 1948	2 years, 1 day	Calcutta	September 1929	(Note: Transferred to High Court of Princely State of Jaipur (later became Rajasthan High Court))
7	Janki Nath Wazir		30 March 1948	2 December 1967	19 years, 248 days	Jammu & Kashmir	1937	
8	Syed Murtaza Fazl Ali		3 December 1967	1 April 1975	7 years, 120 days	Jammu & Kashmir	9 April 1958	
9	Raja Jaswant Singh		2 April 1975	22 January 1976	296 days	Jammu & Kashmir	3 December 1967	
10	Muhammed Rafeeudin Ahmed Ansari		23 January 1976	8 November 1977	1 year, 290 days	Delhi	30 July 1969	
11	Mian Jalal-ud-Din		15 February 1978	22 February 1980	2 years, 8 days	Jammu & Kashmir	10 July 1968	(Note: He became ACJ on 9 November 1977 and served till 14 February 1978 for 98 days before becoming permanent Chief Justice)
12	Mufti Baha-ud-Din		7 March 1983	23 August 1983^{[‡]}	170 days	Jammu & Kashmir	27 August 1971	(Note: He became ACJ on 23 February 1980 and served till 6 March 1983 for 3 years, 12 days before becoming permanent Chief Justice)
13	Vazhakkulangarayil Khalid		24 August 1983	24 June 1984	306 days	Kerala	7 March 1974	
14	Adarsh Sein Anand		11 May 1985	23 October 1989	4 years, 166 days	Jammu & Kashmir	26 May 1975	(Note: He became ACJ on 25 June 1984 and served till 10 May 1985 for 320 days before becoming permanent Chief Justice and later transferred as CJ to Madras High Court)
15 Expand	Sukhdev Singh Kang		24 October 1989	14 May 1993	3 years, 203 days	Punjab & Haryana	19 February 1979	
--	S. M. Rizvi		15 May 1993	9 October 1993	148 days	Jammu & Kashmir	30 May 1984	
16	Satish Chandra Mathur		10 October 1993	17 March 1994	159 days	Allahabad	30 March 1978	
17 Expand	Saiyed Saghir Ahmad		18 March 1994	22 September 1994	189 days	Allahabad	2 November 1981	(Note: Transferred to Undivided Andhra Pradesh High Court)
--	S. M. Rizvi		23 September 1994	9 October 1994	17 days	Jammu & Kashmir	30 May 1984	
18	Muniyallapa Ramakrishna		10 October 1994	15 June 1997	2 years, 249 days	Karnataka	10 January 1983	(Note: Transferred to Gauhati High Court)
19	Bhawani Singh		16 June 1997	20 February 2000	2 years, 250 days	Himachal Pradesh	16 December 1988	(Note: Transferred to Madhya Pradesh High Court)
20	Bhagwati Prasad Saraf		21 February 2000	22 August 2001	1 year, 183 days	Gauhati	2 January 1989	
21 Expand	Hotoi Khetoho Sema		12 September 2001	8 April 2002	209 days	Gauhati	24 May 1989	(Note: He became ACJ on 23 August 2001 and served till 11 September 2001 for 20 days before becoming permanent Chief Justice and later elevated to Supreme Court of India)
--	Vijay Kumar Jhanji		9 April 2002	14 May 2002	36 days	Punjab & Haryana	15 March 1991	
22 Expand	Babulal Chandulal Patel		15 May 2002	4 March 2003	294 days	Gujarat	21 June 1990	(Note: Transferred to Delhi High Court)
--	Vijay Kumar Jhanji		5 March 2003	4 February 2004	337 days	Punjab & Haryana	15 March 1991	
23	Sachchidanand Jha		4 February 2004	11 October 2005	1 year, 250 days	Patna	10 July 1990	(Note: Transferred to Rajasthan High Court)
24 Expand	Bashir Ahmed Khan		25 January 2007	31 March 2007	66 days	Jammu & Kashmir	12 November 1990	(Note: Khan was serving as ACJ of Delhi High Court when he was transferred as ACJ and served as such from 12 October 2005 to 24 January 2007 for 1 year, 105 days before becoming permanent Chief Justice)
--	N. A. Kakru		1 April 2007	5 June 2007	66 days	Jammu & Kashmir	26 November 1997	
--	Aftab Alam		6 June 2007	11 November 2007	159 days	Patna	27 July 1990	(Note: Alam was serving as Judge of Patna High Court when he was transferred as ACJ and his tenure as ACJ was immediately followed by his elevation to Supreme Court of India)
--	N. A. Kakru		12 November 2007	6 January 2008	56 days	Jammu & Kashmir	26 November 1997	
25	Kalavamkodath Sivasankara Panicker Radhakrishnan		7 January 2008	3 September 2008	241 days	Kerala	17 May 1995	(Note: Transferred to Gujarat High Court)
26 Expand	Manmohan Sarin		4 September 2008	19 October 2008	46 days	Delhi	17 May 1995	
--	N. A. Kakru		20 October 2008	2 January 2009	75 days	Jammu & Kashmir	26 November 1997	
27	Barin Ghosh		3 January 2009	12 April 2010	1 year, 100 days	Calcutta	14 July 1995	(Note: Transferred to Sikkim High Court)
28	Aftab Hussain Saikia		13 April 2010	6 April 2011	359 days	Gauhati	15 November 2000	(Note: CJ of Sikkim High Court transferred as CJ of Jammu & Kashmir)
29 Expand	Fakkir Mohamed Ibrahim Kalifulla		18 September 2011	1 April 2012	197 days	Madras	2 March 2000	(Note: He became ACJ on 7 April 2011 and served till 17 September 2011 for 164 days before becoming permanent Chief Justice and later elevated to Supreme Court of India)
--	Virender Singh		2 April 2012	8 June 2012	68 days	Punjab & Haryana	2 July 2002	
30 Expand	Mahesh Mittal Kumar		9 June 2012	4 January 2015	2 years, 210 days	Punjab & Haryana	2 July 2001	
--	M. Y. Mir		5 January 2015	2 February 2015	29 days	Jammu & Kashmir	23 November 2007	
31 Expand	Narayanan Nadar Paul Vasanthakumar		2 February 2015	14 March 2017	2 years, 41 days	Madras	10 December 2005	
--	R. Sudhakar		15 March 2017	31 March 2017	17 days	Madras	10 December 2005	
32 Expand	Badar Durrez Ahmed		1 April 2017	15 March 2018	349 days	Delhi	20 December 2002	
--	R. Sudhakar		16 March 2018	11 May 2018	57 days	Madras	10 December 2005	(Note: Elevated as Chief Justice of Manipur High Court)
--	Alok Aradhe		11 May 2018	10 August 2018	92 days	Madhya Pradesh	29 December 2009	
33 Expand	Gita Mittal		11 August 2018	8 December 2020	2 years, 120 days	Delhi	16 July 2004	
--	Rajesh Bindal		9 December 2020	3 January 2021	26 days	Punjab & Haryana	22 March 2006	(Note: Transferred as Judge to Calcutta High Court)
34	Pankaj Mithal		4 January 2021	11 October 2022	1 year, 281 days	Allahabad	7 July 2006	
35 Expand	Ali Mohammad Magrey		12 October 2022	7 December 2022	57 days	Jammu & Kashmir	8 March 2013	
--	Tashi Rabstan		8 December 2022	14 February 2023	69 days	Jammu & Kashmir	8 March 2013	
36	Nongmeikapam Kotiswar Singh		15 February 2023	17 July 2024	1 year, 154 days	Manipur	17 October 2011	
37 Expand	Tashi Rabstan		27 September 2024	9 April 2025	195 days	Jammu & Kashmir	8 March 2013	(Note: He became ACJ on 18 July 2024 and served till 26 September 2024 for 71 days before becoming permanent Chief Justice)
--	Sanjeev Kumar		10 April 2025	15 April 2025	6 days	Jammu & Kashmir	6 June 2017	
38 Expand	Arun Palli		16 April 2025	1 June 2026	1 year, 47 days	Punjab & Haryana	28 December 2013	
--	Sanjeev Kumar		2 June 2026	8 September 2026	99 days	Jammu & Kashmir	6 June 2017	

== Jharkhand High Court ==
The Jharkhand High Court was established on 15 November 2000 under Bihar Reorganisation Act, 2000 and has had 17 Chief Justices excluding Acting Chief Justices.

For Acting chief justices

#	Name	Portrait	Date of Appointment	Date of Retirement	Tenure	Parent High Court	Date of initial Appointment
1	Vinod Kumar Gupta		5 December 2000	4 March 2003 (Note: Transferred to Himachal Pradesh High Court)	2 years, 90 days	Jammu & Kashmir	7 November 1990
2	Perubhemba Krishna Ayer Balasubramanyan		10 March 2003 (Note: CJ of Orissa High Court transferred as CJ of Jharkhand)	26 August 2004	1 year, 170 days	Kerala	4 June 1992
3	Altamas Kabir		1 March 2005	8 September 2005	192 days	Calcutta	6 August 1990
4	Nelavoy Dhinakar		4 December 2005	9 June 2006	188 days	Madras	17 October 1994
5	Muthusamy Karpaga Vinayagam		17 September 2006	15 May 2008	1 year, 242 days	Madras	8 January 1996
6	Gyan Sudha Misra		13 July 2008	30 April 2010	1 year, 292 days	Patna	16 March 1994
7	Bhagwati Prasad		22 August 2010	12 May 2011	264 days	Rajasthan	6 April 1996
8	Prakash Chandra Tatia		11 September 2011	3 August 2013	1 year, 327 days	Rajasthan	11 January 2001
9	R. Banumathi		16 November 2013	12 August 2014	270 days	Madras	3 April 2003
10	Virender Singh		1 November 2014	6 October 2016	1 year, 341 days	Punjab & Haryana	2 July 2002
11	Pradip Kumar Mohanty		24 March 2017	9 June 2017	78 days	Orissa	7 March 2002
12	Aniruddha Bose		11 August 2018	23 May 2019	286 days	Calcutta	19 January 2004
13	Ravi Ranjan		17 November 2019	19 December 2022	3 years, 33 days	Patna	14 July 2008
14	Sanjaya Kumar Mishra		20 February 2023	28 December 2023	312 days	Orissa	7 October 2009
15	Bidyut Ranjan Sarangi		5 July 2024	19 July 2024	15 days	Orissa	20 June 2013
16	Mamidanna Satyaratna Ramachandra Rao		25 September 2024 (Note: CJ of Himachal Pradesh High Court transferred as CJ of Jharkhand)	21 July 2025 (Note: Transferred to Tripura High Court)	300 days	Telangana	29 June 2012
17	Tarlok Singh Chauhan		23 July 2025	8 January 2026	170 days	Himachal Pradesh	23 February 2014

== Karnataka High Court ==
The Karnataka High Court was established in 1884 under the Mysore High Court Act, 1884 and has had 34 permanent Chief Justices and several Acting Chief Justices.

#	Name	Portrait	Date of Appointment	Date of Retirement	Tenure	Parent High Court	Date of initial Appointment	Notes
1 Expand	Rudrapatna Venkataramaiah		1 November 1956	16 July 1957	258 days	Karnataka	25 February 1946	
--	N. S. Rau		16 July 1957	24 July 1957	9 days	Karnataka	11 June 1955	
2	Subodh Ranjan Das Gupta		25 July 1957	13 August 1961	4 years, 20 days	Calcutta	3 January 1949	
3 Expand	Nittoor Srinivasa Rau		29 March 1962	7 August 1963	1 year, 132 days	Karnataka	11 June 1955	(Note: He became ACJ on 14 August 1961 and served till 28 March 1962 for 227 days before becoming permanent Chief Justice)
--	Hombe Gowda		7 August 1963	1 August 1969^{[†]}	5 years, 360 days	Karnataka	11 June 1955	
4	Arni Ramasvami Somanath Iyer		23 November 1969	29 December 1969	37 days	Karnataka	11 July 1957	(Note: He became ACJ on 1 August 1969 and served till 22 November 1969 for 64 days before becoming permanent Chief Justice)
5	Mahadevayya Sadasivayya		30 December 1969	16 September 1970	261 days	Karnataka	26 August 1957	
6	Ammembal Narayana Pai		17 September 1970	6 June 1973	2 years, 263 days	Karnataka	14 March 1958	
7 Expand	Guthu Konethota Govinda Bhat		7 June 1973	14 December 1977	4 years, 191 days	Karnataka	9 April 1962	
--	C. Honniah		15 December 1977	21 March 1978	97 days	Karnataka	15 March 1965	
8	Deshmudre Mallappa Chandrashekhar		22 March 1978	25 September 1982	4 years, 188 days	Karnataka	20 September 1963	(Note: CJ of Allahabad High Court transferred as CJ of Karnataka)
9	Koratagere Bhimaiah		28 October 1982	10 April 1983	165 days	Karnataka	19 July 1965	(Note: He became ACJ on 26 September 1982 and served till 27 October 1982 for 32 days before becoming permanent Chief Justice)
10 Expand	Vijaykumar Siddheshwaraswami Malimath		6 February 1984	24 October 1985	1 year, 261 days	Karnataka	5 March 1970	(Note: He became ACJ on 11 April 1983 and served till 5 February 1984 for 301 days before becoming permanent Chief Justice and later transferred as CJ to Kerala High Court)
--	K. Jagannatha Shetty		24 October 1985	27 August 1986	308 days	Karnataka	25 June 1970	
11 Expand	Prem Chand Jain		28 August 1986	16 September 1989	3 years, 20 days	Punjab & Haryana	24 June 1968	(Note: CJ of Punjab & Haryana High Court transferred as CJ of Karnataka)
--	M. Rama Jois		17 September 1989	25 October 1989	39 days	Karnataka	28 November 1977	
12 Expand	Shanmughasundaram Mohan		26 October 1989	6 October 1991	1 year, 346 days	Madras	27 February 1974	(Note: CJ of Madras High Court transferred as CJ of Karnataka)
--	M. Rama Jois		7 October 1991	31 October 1991	25 days	Karnataka	28 November 1977	
13 Expand	Sam Piroj Bharucha		1 November 1991	30 June 1992	243 days	Bombay	19 September 1977	
--	K. A. Swamy		1 July 1992	1 July 1993	1 year, 1 day	Karnataka	1 January 1979	(Note: Elevated as Chief Justice of Madras High Court)
14 Expand	Shailesh Bhadrayulal Majumdar		2 July 1993	18 September 1994	1 year, 79 days	Gujarat	3 October 1978	(Note: CJ of Undivided Andhra Pradesh High Court transferred as CJ of Karnataka)
--	M. Ramakrishna		19 September 1994	27 September 1994	9 days	Karnataka	10 January 1983	
15 Expand	Girish Thakorlal Nanavati		28 September 1994	5 March 1995	159 days	Gujarat	19 July 1979	(Note: CJ of Orissa High Court transferred as CJ of Karnataka)
--	Syed Abdul Hakeem		6 March 1995	27 July 1995	144 days	Karnataka	25 May 1984	
16	Madhav Laxman Pendse		28 July 1995	25 March 1996^{[‡]}	242 days	Bombay	25 January 1978	
17 Expand	Syed Abdul Hakeem		3 May 1996	9 May 1996	7 days	Karnataka	25 May 1984	(Note: He became ACJ on 26 March 1996 and served till 2 May 1996 for 38 days before becoming permanent Chief Justice)
--	S. Rajendra Babu		10 May 1996	28 June 1996	50 days	Karnataka	19 February 1988	
18	Ram Prakash Sethi		29 June 1996	6 January 1999	2 years, 192 days	Jammu & Kashmir	30 May 1986	
19 Expand	Yarabati Bhaskar Rao		9 March 1999	26 June 2000	1 year, 110 days	Andhra Pradesh	11 July 1986	(Note: He became ACJ on 7 January 1999 and served till 8 March 1999 for 61 days before becoming permanent Chief Justice)
--	Ashok Bhan		27 June 2000	20 October 2000	116 days	Punjab & Haryana	15 June 1990	
20 Expand	Ponaka Venkatarama Reddi		21 October 2000	16 August 2001	300 days	Andhra Pradesh	16 March 1990	
--	G. C. Bharuka		17 August 2001	30 August 2001	14 days	Patna	27 July 1990	
21 Expand	Nagendra Kumar Jain		31 August 2001	20 October 2004	3 years, 51 days	Rajasthan	20 July 1990	
--	S. R. Nayak		20 October 2004	18 November 2004	30 days	Karnataka	25 February 1994	
22 Expand	Nauvdip Kumar Sodhi		19 November 2004	29 November 2005	1 year, 11 days	Punjab & Haryana	15 March 1991	(Note: CJ of Kerala High Court transferred as CJ of Karnataka)
--	B. Padmaraj		29 November 2005	6 January 2006	39 days	Karnataka	30 November 1994	
23 Expand	Cyriac Joseph		7 January 2006	6 July 2008	2 years, 182 days	Kerala	6 July 1994	(Note: CJ of Uttarakhand High Court transferred as CJ of Karnataka)
--	Deepak Verma		7 July 2008	7 August 2008	32 days	Madhya Pradesh	15 December 1994	
24	Paul Daniel Dinakaran Premkumar		8 August 2008	7 August 2010	2 years, 0 days	Madras	19 December 1996	(Note: Transferred to Sikkim High Court)
25	Jagdish Singh Khehar		8 August 2010	12 September 2011	1 year, 36 days	Punjab & Haryana	8 February 1999	
26 Expand	Vikramajit Sen		24 December 2011	24 December 2012	1 year, 1 day	Delhi	7 July 1999	(Note: He became ACJ on 13 September 2011 and served till 23 December 2011 for 102 days before becoming permanent Chief Justice)
--	Karanam Sreedhar Rao		25 December 2012	6 March 2013	72 days	Karnataka	21 February 2000	
27	Dhirendra Hiralal Waghela		7 March 2013	3 June 2015	2 years, 89 days	Gujarat	17 September 1999	(Note: Transferred to Orissa High Court)
28 Expand	Subhro Kamal Mukherjee		23 February 2016	9 October 2017	1 year, 229 days	Calcutta	15 September 2000	(Note: He became ACJ on 4 June 2015 and served till 22 February 2016 for 264 days before becoming permanent Chief Justice)
--	Humchadakatte G. Ramesh		10 October 2017	12 February 2018	126 days	Karnataka	12 May 2003	
29 Expand	Dinesh Maheshwari		12 February 2018	17 January 2019	340 days	Rajasthan	2 September 2004	(Note: CJ of Meghalaya High Court transferred as CJ of Karnataka)
--	L. N. Swamy		18 January 2019	9 May 2019	112 days	Karnataka	4 July 2007	
30 Expand	Abhay Shreeniwas Oka		10 May 2019	30 August 2021	2 years, 113 days	Bombay	29 August 2003	
--	S. C. Sharma		31 August 2021	10 October 2021	41 days	Madhya Pradesh	18 January 2008	(Note: Elevated as Chief Justice of Telangana High Court)
31 Expand	Ritu Raj Awasthi		11 October 2021	2 July 2022	265 days	Allahabad	13 April 2009	
--	Alok Aradhe		3 July 2022	14 October 2022	104 days	Madhya Pradesh	29 December 2009	
32	Prasanna Bhalachandra Varale		15 October 2022	24 January 2024	1 year, 102 days	Bombay	18 July 2008	
33	Pratinidhi Srinivasacharya Dinesh Kumar		3 February 2024	24 February 2024	22 days	Karnataka	2 January 2015	(Note: He became ACJ on 25 January 2024 and served till 2 February 2024 for 9 days before becoming permanent Chief Justice)
34 Expand	Nilay Vipinchandra Anjaria		25 February 2024	29 May 2025	1 year, 94 days	Gujarat	21 November 2011	
--	V. Kameswar Rao		30 May 2025	18 July 2025	50 days	Delhi	17 April 2013	(Note: Transferred as Judge to Delhi High Court)

== Kerala High Court ==
The Kerala High Court was established on 1 November 1956 under States Reorganisation Act, 1956 and has had 39 permanent Chief Justices and several Acting Chief Justices. History section of website of Kerala Judicial Academy contains list of former chief justices of Kerala High Court (both acting and permanent) after 1986. Thus the list contained in this website would serve as primary reference for acting chief justices after 1986.

#	Name	Portrait	Date of Appointment	Date of Retirement	Tenure	Parent High Court	Date of initial Appointment	Notes
1	Kaithayil Thomas Koshi		1 November 1956	31 January 1959	2 years, 92 days	Cochin (Note: Cochin High Court was converted into Kerala High Court on 1 November 1956 and all of its judges were transferred to Kerala High court)	12 September 1944	
2	Kesavan Sankaran		2 February 1959	28 March 1960	1 year, 56 days	Cochin	July 1948	
3	Mohammed Ahmed Ansari		29 March 1960	25 November 1961	1 year, 242 days	Hyderabad (Note: Hyderabad High Court ceased to exist when it was merged into Andhra Pradesh High Court on 1 November 1957 and all of its judges were transferred to Andhra Pradesh High court)	29 November 1946	
4	Mannathazhath Sankarakutti Menon		26 November 1961	12 June 1969	7 years, 199 days	Cochin	29 January 1953	
5	Padinharankunnath Thazhathayil Raman Nair		12 June 1969	1 September 1971	2 years, 82 days	Kerala	22 February 1957	
6	Thoniparambil Chinnan Raghavan		2 September 1971	21 May 1973	1 year, 262 days	Kerala	15 December 1959	
7	Padmanbhapillay Govindan Nair		22 May 1973	2 January 1977	3 years, 226 days	Kerala	29 January 1962	(Note: Transferred to Madras High Court)
8	Vannathankandiyil Puthiyedath Gopalan Nambiyar		3 January 1977	18 January 1980	3 years, 16 days	Kerala	22 March 1965	
9	Vettath Balakrishna Eradi		19 January 1980	29 January 1981	1 year, 11 days	Kerala	5 April 1967	
10	Padmanabhan Subramanian Poti		6 June 1983	27 September 1983	114 days	Kerala	20 March 1969	(Note: He became ACJ on 29 January 1981 and served till 5 June 1983 for 2 years, 127 days before becoming permanent Chief Justice and later transferred as CJ to Gujarat High Court)
11 Expand	Kattali Bhaskaran		21 March 1985	8 October 1985	202 days	Kerala	3 April 1972	(Note: He became ACJ on 28 September 1983 and served till 20 March 1985 for 1 year, 174 days before becoming permanent Chief Justice and later transferred as CJ to undivided Andhra Pradesh High Court)
--	T. K. Thommen		9 October 1985	24 October 1985	16 days	Kerala	9 May 1975	
12 Expand	Vijaykumar Siddheshwaraswami Malimath		25 October 1985	10 June 1991	5 years, 229 days	Karnataka	5 March 1970	(Note: CJ of Karnataka High Court transferred as CJ of Kerala)
--	U. L. Bhat		11 June 1991	7 August 1991	58 days	Kerala	18 September 1980	
13 Expand	Mamidanna Jagannadha Rao		8 August 1991	5 April 1994	2 years, 241 days	Andhra Pradesh	29 November 1982	(Note: Transferred to Delhi High Court)
--	Varghese Kalliath		6 April 1994	20 April 1994	15 days	Kerala	11 June 1984	
14	Sujata Manohar		21 April 1994	4 November 1994	198 days	Bombay	23 January 1978	(Note: CJ of Bombay High Court transferred as CJ of Kerala)
15 Expand	Manadath Mohammed Pareed Pillay		5 November 1994	17 September 1995	317 days	Kerala	31 January 1985	
--	K. T. Thomas		18 September 1995	26 March 1996	191 days	Kerala	12 August 1985	(Note: Immediately elevated to Supreme Court of India)
--	K. Sreedharan		27 March 1996	22 July 1996	118 days	Kerala	10 September 1985	
16	Uday Pratap Singh		23 July 1996	19 December 1997	1 year, 150 days	Patna	15 February 1984	
17 Expand	Om Prakash Verma		20 December 1997	19 March 1999	1 year, 90 days	Allahabad	24 May 1984	
--	G. Rajasekharan		20 March 1999	23 May 1999	65 days	Kerala	23 November 1989	(Note: Retired as ACJ)
--	A. R. Lakshmanan		23 May 1999	19 September 1999	120 days	Madras	14 June 1990	
18 Expand	Arijit Pasayat		20 September 1999	8 May 2000	233 days	Orissa	20 March 1989	
--	A. R. Lakshmanan		8 May 2000	27 May 2000	20 days	Madras	14 June 1990	(Note: Elevated as Chief Justice of Rajasthan High Court)
--	K. K. Usha		28 May 2000	29 May 2000	2 days	Kerala	25 February 1991	
19	Arvind Vinayakarao Savant		30 May 2000	16 September 2000	110 days	Bombay	30 July 1990	
20 Expand	Karinchet Kumaran Usha		30 November 2000	2 July 2001	215 days	Kerala	25 February 1991	(Note: She became ACJ on 17 September 2000 and served till 29 November 2000 for 74 days before becoming permanent Chief Justice)
--	P. K. Balasubramanyan		3 July 2001	6 September 2001	66 days	Kerala	4 June 1992	
21 Expand	Bellur Narayanswamy Srikrishna		7 September 2001	1 October 2002	1 year, 25 days	Bombay	30 July 1990	
--	Cyriac Joseph		2 October 2002	1 November 2002	31 days	Kerala	6 July 1994	
22	Jawahar Lal Gupta		2 November 2002	21 January 2004	1 year, 81 days	Punjab & Haryana	15 March 1991	
23 Expand	Nauvdip Kumar Sodhi		6 April 2004	17 November 2004	226 days	Punjab & Haryana	15 March 1991	(Note: He became ACJ on 22 January 2004 and served till 5 April 2004 for 75 days before becoming permanent Chief Justice and later transferred as CJ to Karnataka High Court)
--	Cyriac Joseph		18 November 2004	20 November 2004	3 days	Kerala	6 July 1994	
24 Expand	Bollampally Subhashan Reddy		21 November 2004	1 March 2005	101 days	Andhra Pradesh	25 November 1991	(Note: CJ of Madras High Court transferred as CJ of Kerala)
--	Cyriac Joseph		2 March 2005	18 March 2005	17 days	Kerala	6 July 1994	(Note: Elevated as Chief Justice of Uttarakhand High Court)
--	K. S. Radhakrishnan		19 March 2005	26 April 2005	39 days	Kerala	17 May 1995	
25 Expand	Rajeev Gupta		27 April 2005	10 January 2006	259 days	Madhya Pradesh	27 September 1994	(Note: Transferred to Uttarakhand High Court)
--	K. S. Radhakrishnan		11 January 2006	21 January 2006	11 days	Kerala	17 May 1995	
26 Expand	Vinod Kumar Bali		22 January 2006	23 January 2007	1 year, 2 days	Punjab & Haryana	15 March 1991	
--	K. S. Radhakrishnan		24 January 2007	17 May 2007	114 days	Kerala	17 May 1995	
27 Expand	Handyala Lakshminarayanaswamy Dattu	H. L. Dattu	18 May 2007	15 December 2008	1 year, 212 days	Karnataka	18 December 1995	(Note: CJ of Chhattisgarh High Court transferred as CJ of Kerala)
--	J. B. Koshy		16 December 2008	13 March 2009	88 days	Kerala	17 January 1996	(Note: Elevated as Chief Justice of Patna High Court)
--	Kurian Joseph		14 March 2009	17 March 2009	4 days	Kerala	12 July 2000	
28 Expand	Samindar Rudrayya Bannurmath		18 March 2009	22 January 2010	311 days	Karnataka	11 June 1997	
--	Kurian Joseph		23 January 2010	5 February 2010	14 days	Kerala	12 July 2000	(Note: Elevated as Chief Justice of Himachal Pradesh High Court)
--	P. R. Raman		6 February 2010	16 March 2010	39 days	Kerala	7 September 2001	
29 Expand	Jasti Chelameswar		17 March 2010	9 October 2011	1 year, 207 days	Andhra Pradesh	23 June 1997	(Note: CJ of Gauhati High Court transferred as CJ of Kerala)
--	C. N. Ramachandran Nair		10 October 2011	8 November 2011	30 days	Kerala	7 September 2001	
30	Manjula Chellur		26 September 2012	1 August 2014	1 year, 310 days	Karnataka	21 February 2000	(Note: Chellur was serving as Judge of Karnataka High Court when she was transferred as ACJ and served as such from 9 November 2011 to 25 September 2012 for 322 days before becoming permanent Chief Justice and subsequently transferred as CJ to Calcutta High Court)
31 Expand	Ashok Bhushan		26 March 2015	12 May 2016	1 year, 48 days	Allahabad	24 April 2001	(Note: He became ACJ on 2 August 2014 and served till 25 March 2015 for 236 days before becoming permanent Chief Justice and later elevated to Supreme Court of India)
--	T. B. Radhakrishnan		13 May 2016	31 July 2016	80 days	Kerala	14 October 2004	
32 Expand	Mohan Shantanagoudar		22 September 2016	16 February 2017	148 days	Karnataka	12 May 2003	(Note: Shantanagoudar was serving as Judge of Karnataka High Court when he was transferred as ACJ and served as such from 1 August 2016 to 21 September 2016 for 52 days before becoming permanent Chief Justice and later elevated to Supreme Court of India)
--	T. B. Radhakrishnan		16 February 2017	17 March 2017^{[§]}	30 days	Kerala	14 October 2004	(Note: Elevated as Chief Justice of Chhattisgarh High Court)
--	Antony Dominic		17 March 2017	20 March 2017	4 days	Kerala	30 January 2007	
33	Navniti Prasad Singh		20 March 2017	6 November 2017	232 days	Patna	6 March 2006	
34	Antony Dominic		9 February 2018	30 May 2018	111 days	Kerala	30 January 2007	(Note: He became ACJ on 6 November 2017 and served till 8 February 2018 for 95 days before becoming permanent Chief Justice)
35 Expand	Hrishikesh Roy		8 August 2018	22 September 2019	1 year, 46 days	Gauhati	12 October 2006	(Note: Roy was serving as Judge of Gauhati High Court when he was transferred as ACJ and served as such from 30 May 2018 to 7 August 2018 for 70 days before becoming permanent Chief Justice and later elevated to Supreme Court of India)
--	C. K. Abdul Rehim		22 September 2019	11 October 2019	20 days	Kerala	5 January 2009	
36	S. Manikumar		11 October 2019	24 April 2023	3 years, 196 days	Madras	31 July 2006	
37 Expand	Sarasa Venkatanarayana Bhatti		1 June 2023	14 July 2023	44 days	Andhra Pradesh	12 April 2013	(Note: He became ACJ on 24 April 2023 and served till 31 May 2023 for 38 days before becoming permanent Chief Justice and later elevated to Supreme Court of India)
--	Alexander Thomas		14 July 2023	21 July 2023	8 days	Kerala	23 January 2014	
38 Expand	Ashish Jitendra Desai		22 July 2023	4 July 2024	349 days	Gujarat	21 November 2011	
--	A. M. Mustaque		5 July 2024	25 September 2024	83 days	Kerala	23 January 2014	
39	Nitin Madhukar Jamdar		26 September 2024	9 January 2026	1 year, 106 days	Bombay	23 January 2012	

== Madhya Pradesh High Court ==
The Madhya Pradesh High Court was established on 2 January 1936 under the Government of India Act 1935 and has had 29 Chief Justices excluding Acting Chief Justices.

For Acting chief justices

#	Name	Portrait	Date of Appointment	Date of Retirement	Tenure	Parent High Court	Date of initial Appointment
1	Mohammad Hidayatullah		1 November 1956	12 December 1958	2 years, 42 days	Nagpur (Note: Nagpur High court ceased to exist on 1 November 1956 when it was converted into newly established Madhya Pradesh High Court and some of its judges became judges of Madhya Pradesh High court while some of its judges were transferred to Bombay High Court)	27 June 1946
2	Ganesh Prasad Bhutt		13 December 1958	22 September 1959	284 days	Nagpur	10 February 1953
3	Purushottam Vinayak Dixit		22 September 1959	18 March 1969	9 years, 178 days	Gwalior (Note: Gwalior High Court was subsumed into Madhya Bharat High Court on 24 January 1950 which in turn was merged into newly established Madhya Pradesh High Court on 1 November 1956)	1942
4	Bishambhar Dayal		19 March 1969	13 September 1972	3 years, 179 days	Allahabad	6 May 1957
5	Prabhakar Keshava Tare		14 September 1972	10 October 1975	3 years, 27 days	Madhya Pradesh	14 December 1957
6	Shivdayal Shrivastava		11 October 1975	27 February 1978	2 years, 140 days	Madhya Pradesh	3 November 1958
7	Ananda Prakash Sen		28 February 1978	16 July 1978	139 days	Madhya Pradesh	7 November 1967
8	Guru Prasanna Singh		27 July 1978	3 January 1984	5 years, 161 days	Madhya Pradesh	7 November 1967
9	Goverdhan Lal Oza		1 December 1984	26 October 1985	330 days	Madhya Pradesh	29 July 1968
10	Jagdish Sharan Verma		14 June 1986	31 August 1986 (Note: Transferred to Rajasthan High Court)	79 days	Madhya Pradesh	12 September 1972
11	Narayan Dutta Ojha		8 January 1987	18 January 1988	1 year, 11 days	Allahabad	3 September 1971
12	Gangadhar Ganesh Sohani		20 October 1989	23 October 1989 (Note: Transferred to Patna High Court)	4 days	Madhya Pradesh	2 June 1973
13	Sushil Kumar Jha		27 October 1989 (Note: CJ of Patna High Court transferred as CJ of Madhya Pradesh)	15 December 1993	4 years, 50 days	Patna	12 April 1973
14	Ullal Lakshminarayana Bhat		15 December 1993 (Note: CJ of Gauhati High Court transferred as CJ of Madhya Pradesh)	13 October 1995	1 year, 303 days	Kerala	18 September 1980
15	Ashok Kumar Mathur		3 February 1996	21 December 1999 (Note: Transferred to Calcutta High Court)	3 years, 322 days	Rajasthan	13 July 1985
16	Bhawani Singh		24 February 2000 (Note: CJ of Jammu & Kashmir High Court transferred as CJ of Madhya Pradesh)	24 August 2003 (Note: Transferred to Gujarat High Court)	3 years, 182 days	Himachal Pradesh	16 December 1988
17	Kumar Rajarathnam		6 September 2003	12 March 2004	189 days	Madras	1 January 1994
18	Raju Varadarajulu Raveendran		8 July 2004	8 September 2005	1 year, 63 days	Karnataka	22 February 1993
19	Ananga Kumar Patnaik		2 October 2005 (Note: CJ of Chhattisgarh High Court transferred as CJ of Madhya Pradesh)	16 November 2009	4 years, 46 days	Orissa	13 January 1994
20	Syed Rafat Alam		20 December 2009	4 August 2011 (Note: Transferred to Allahabad High Court)	1 year, 228 days	Patna	8 November 1994
21	Sharad Arvind Bobde		16 October 2012	11 April 2013	178 days	Bombay	29 March 2000
22	Ajay Manikrao Khanwilkar		24 November 2013 (Note: CJ of Himachal Pradesh High Court transferred as CJ of Madhya Pradesh)	12 May 2016	2 years, 171 days	Bombay	29 March 2000
23	Hemant Gupta		18 March 2017	1 November 2018	1 year, 229 days	Punjab & Haryana	2 July 2002
24	Sanjay Kumar Seth		14 November 2018	9 June 2019	208 days	Madhya Pradesh	21 March 2003
25	Ajay Kumar Mittal		3 November 2019 (Note: CJ of Meghalaya High Court transferred as CJ of Madhya Pradesh)	29 September 2020	332 days	Punjab & Haryana	9 January 2004
26	Mohammad Rafiq		3 January 2021 (Note: CJ of Orissa High Court transferred as CJ of Madhya Pradesh)	13 October 2021 (Note: Transferred to Himachal Pradesh High Court)	284 days	Rajasthan	15 May 2006
27	Ravi Vijayakumar Malimath		14 October 2021	24 May 2024	2 years, 224 days	Karnataka	18 February 2008
28	Suresh Kumar Kait		25 September 2024	23 May 2025	241 days	Delhi	5 September 2008
29	Sanjeev Sachdeva		17 July 2025	1 June 2026	320 days	Delhi	17 April 2013

== Madras High Court ==
The Madras High Court was established on 15 August 1862 under the Indian High Courts Act 1861 and has had 46 permanent Chief Justices and several Acting Chief Justices

#	Name	Portrait	Date of Appointment	Date of Retirement	Tenure	Parent High Court	Date of initial Appointment	Notes
1	Colley Harman Scotland		15 August 1862	21 November 1871	9 years, 99 days	Bar	--	
2	Walter Morgan		22 November 1871	7 February 1879	7 years, 78 days	Calcutta	1 July 1862	(Note: CJ of Allahabad High Court transferred as CJ of Madras)
3	Charles Arthur Turner		3 March 1879	July 1885		Allahabad	17 March 1866	
4	Arthur John Hammond Collins		28 November 1885	August 1899		Bar	--	
5	Charles Arnold White		September 1899	July 1914		Bar	--	
6	John Edward Power Wallis		November 1914	1921		Madras	1907	
7	Walter George Salis Schwabe		1921	1924^{[‡]}		Bar	--	
8	Murray Coutts-Trotter		3 June 1924	1929^{[‡]}		Madras	January 1915	
9	Horace Owen Compton Beasley		1929	1937		Burma	1923	
10	Alfred Henry Lionel Leach		1937	1947		Burma	10 February 1933	
11	Fredrick William Gentle		12 July 1947	19 April 1948^{[‡]}	283 days	Madras	1936	
12	Pakala Venkata Rajamannar		20 April 1948	9 May 1961	13 years, 20 days	Madras	25 July 1945	
13	Subramanya Ramachandra Iyer		16 September 1961	1 November 1964^{[‡]}	3 years, 47 days	Madras	29 January 1958	(Note: He became ACJ on 10 May 1961 and served till 15 September 1961 for 129 days before becoming permanent Chief Justice)
14	Palagani Chandra Reddy		23 November 1964	30 June 1966	1 year, 220 days	Madras	16 July 1949	(Note: CJ of Undivided Andhra Pradesh High Court transferred as CJ of Madras)
15	Madavayya Anantanarayanan		1 July 1966	30 April 1969	2 years, 304 days	Madras	10 August 1959	
16	Kuppuswami Naidu Veeraswami		1 May 1969	7 April 1976	6 years, 343 days	Madras	20 February 1960	
17	Palapatti Sadaya Goundar Kailasam		8 April 1976	2 January 1977	270 days	Madras	20 October 1960	
18	Padmanbhapillay Govindan Nair		3 January 1977	28 May 1978	1 year, 146 days	Kerala	29 January 1962	(Note: CJ of Kerala High Court transferred as CJ of Madras)
19	Tayi Ramaprasada Rao		29 May 1978	5 November 1979	1 year, 161 days	Madras	7 December 1966	
20 Expand	Muhammad Kassim Muhammad Ismail		6 November 1979	9 July 1981^{[‡]}	1 year, 246 days	Delhi	20 February 1967	
--	P. R. Gokulakrishnan		10 July 1981	11 March 1982	245 days	Madras	11 July 1969	
21 Expand	Krishna Ballabh Narayan Singh		12 March 1982	24 January 1984	1 year, 319 days	Patna	15 November 1966	(Note: CJ of Patna High Court transferred as CJ of Madras)
--	P. R. Gokulakrishnan		25 January 1984	2 April 1984	69 days	Madras	11 July 1969	
22 Expand	Madhukar Narhar Chandurkar		2 April 1984	13 March 1988	3 years, 347 days	Bombay	28 October 1967	(Note: CJ of Bombay High Court transferred as CJ of Madras)
--	S. R. Pandian		14 March 1988	13 December 1988	275 days	Madras	27 February 1974	(Note: Immediately elevated to Supreme Court of India)
23	Shanmughasundaram Mohan		19 October 1989	25 October 1989	7 days	Madras	27 February 1974	(Note: He became ACJ on 14 December 1988 and served till 18 October 1989 for 309 days before becoming permanent Chief Justice and later transferred as CJ to Karnataka High Court)
24 Expand	Adarsh Sein Anand		1 November 1989	17 November 1991	2 years, 17 days	Jammu & Kashmir	26 May 1975	(Note: CJ of Jammu & Kashmir High Court transferred as CJ of Madras)
--	S. N. Sundaram		18 November 1991	14 June 1992	210 days	Madras	4 January 1978	(Note: Elevated as Chief Justice of Gujarat High Court)
25 Expand	Kanta Kumari Bhatnagar		15 June 1992	14 November 1992	153 days	Rajasthan	26 September 1978	
--	V. Ratnam		15 November 1992	30 June 1993	228 days	Madras	25 January 1979	
26 Expand	Kudarikoti Annadanayya Swamy		1 July 1993	19 March 1997	3 years, 262 days	Karnataka	1 January 1979	
--	K. A. Thanikkachallam		20 March 1997	6 July 1997	109 days	Madras	14 August 1988	
27 Expand	Manmohan Singh Liberhan		7 July 1997	27 December 1998	1 year, 174 days	Punjab & Haryana	11 February 1987	(Note: Transferred to Undivided Andhra Pradesh High Court)
--	Shivaraj Patil		28 December 1998	19 January 1999	23 days	Karnataka	29 March 1990	(Note: Elevated as Chief Justice of Rajasthan High Court)
--	N. K. Jain		20 January 1999	23 May 1999	124 days	Rajasthan	20 July 1990	
28 Expand	Ashok Chhotelal Agarwal		24 May 1999	26 August 1999	95 days	Bombay	21 November 1986	
--	N. K. Jain		27 August 1999	8 September 1999	13 days	Rajasthan	20 July 1990	
29	Konakuppakattil Gopinathan Balakrishnan		9 September 1999	7 June 2000	273 days	Kerala	26 September 1985	(Note: CJ of Gujarat High Court transferred as CJ of Madras)
30 Expand	Nagendra Kumar Jain		13 September 2000	30 August 2001	352 days	Rajasthan	20 July 1990	(Note: He became ACJ on 7 June 2000 and served till 12 September 2000 for 98 days before becoming permanent Chief Justice and later transferred as CJ to Karnataka High Court)
--	K. Narayana Kurup		31 August 2001	11 September 2001	12 days	Kerala	20 October 1992	
31 Expand	Bollampally Subhashan Reddy		12 September 2001	20 November 2004	3 years, 70 days	Andhra Pradesh	25 November 1991	(Note: Transferred to Kerala High Court)
--	N. Dhinakar		21 November 2004	27 November 2004	7 days	Madras	17 October 1994	
32 Expand	Markandey Katju		28 November 2004	10 October 2005	317 days	Allahabad	30 November 1991	(Note: Transferred to Delhi High Court)
--	N. Dhinakar		11 October 2005	11 November 2005	32 days	Madras	17 October 1994	
33 Expand	Ajit Prakash Shah		12 November 2005	9 May 2008	2 years, 180 days	Bombay	18 December 1992	
--	S. J. Mukhopadhaya		10 May 2008	18 May 2008	9 days	Patna	8 November 1994	
34 Expand	Asok Kumar Ganguly		19 May 2008	15 December 2008	211 days	Calcutta	10 January 1994	(Note: CJ of Orissa High Court transferred as CJ of Madras)
--	S. J. Mukhopadhaya		16 December 2008	8 March 2009	83 days	Patna	8 November 1994	
35 Expand	Hemant Laxman Gokhale		9 March 2009	28 April 2010	1 year, 51 days	Bombay	20 January 1994	
--	Elipe Dharma Rao		29 April 2010	10 June 2010	43 days	Andhra Pradesh	17 May 1999	
36 Expand	Mokhtarajama Yusuf Eqbal		11 June 2010	23 December 2012	2 years, 196 days	Jharkhand	9 May 1996	
--	Elipe Dharma Rao		11 June 1991	7 August 1991	58 days	Andhra Pradesh	17 May 1999	
37 Expand	Rajesh Kumar Agrawal		24 October 2013	16 February 2014	116 days	Allahabad	5 February 1999	(Note: Agrawal was serving as Judge of Allahabad High Court when he was transferred as ACJ and served as such from 7 February 2013 to 23 October 2013 for 259 days before becoming permanent Chief Justice and later elevated to Supreme Court of India)
--	S. K. Agnihotri		16 February 2014	25 July 2014	160 days	Chhattisgarh	5 May 2005	
38 Expand	Sanjay Kishan Kaul		26 July 2014	16 February 2017	2 years, 206 days	Delhi	3 May 2001	(Note: CJ of Punjab & Haryana High Court transferred as CJ of Madras)
--	Huluvadi G. Ramesh		16 February 2017	4 April 2017	48 days	Karnataka	8 September 2003	
39 Expand	Indira Banerjee		5 April 2017	6 August 2018	1 year, 124 days	Calcutta	5 February 2002	
--	Huluvadi G. Ramesh		7 August 2018	11 August 2018	5 days	Karnataka	8 September 2003	
40 Expand	Vijaya Kamlesh Tahilramani		12 August 2018	6 September 2019^{[‡]}	1 year, 26 days	Bombay	26 June 2001	
--	Vineet Kothari		7 September 2019	10 November 2019	65 days	Rajasthan	13 June 2005	
41 Expand	Amreshwar Pratap Sahi		11 November 2019	31 December 2020	1 year, 51 days	Allahabad	24 September 2004	
--	Vineet Kothari		1 January 2021	3 January 2021	3 days	Rajasthan	13 June 2005	(Note: Transferred as Judge to Gujarat High Court)
42 Expand	Sanjib Banerjee		4 January 2021	16 November 2021	317 days	Calcutta	22 June 2006	(Note: Transferred to Meghalaya High Court)
--	M. Duraiswamy		17 November 2021	21 November 2021	5 days	Madras	31 March 2009	
43 Expand	Munishwar Nath Bhandari		14 February 2022	12 September 2022	211 days	Rajasthan	5 July 2007	(Note: Bhandari was serving as Judge of Allahabad High Court when he was transferred as ACJ and served as such from 22 November 2021 to 13 February 2022 for 84 days before becoming permanent Chief Justice)
--	M. Duraiswamy		13 September 2022	21 September 2022	9 days	Madras	31 March 2009	(Note: Retired as ACJ)
--	T. Raja		22 September 2022	24 May 2023	245 days	Madras	31 March 2009	
--	S. Vaidyanathan		25 May 2023	27 May 2023	3 days	Madras	25 October 2013	
44 Expand	Sanjay Vijaykumar Gangapurwala		28 May 2023	23 May 2024	362 days	Bombay	13 March 2010	
--	R. Mahadevan		24 May 2024	17 July 2024	55 days	Madras	25 October 2013	(Note: Immediately elevated to Supreme Court of India)
--	D. Krishnakumar		18 July 2024	26 September 2024	72 days	Madras	7 April 2016	
45	Kalpathi Rajendran Shriram		27 September 2024	20 July 2025	297 days	Bombay	21 June 2013	(Note: Transferred to Rajasthan High Court)
46	Manindra Mohan Shrivastava		21 July 2025	5 March 2026	228 days	Chhattisgarh	10 December 2009	(Note: CJ of Rajasthan High Court transferred as CJ of Madras)

== Manipur High Court ==
The Manipur High Court was established on 25 March 2013 under the North-Eastern Areas (Reorganisation) and Other Related Laws (Amendment) Act, 2012 and has had 9 Chief Justices excluding Acting Chief Justices.

For Acting chief justices

#	Name	Portrait	Date of Appointment	Date of Retirement	Tenure	Parent High Court	Date of initial Appointment
1	Abhay Manohar Sapre		23 March 2013	18 October 2013 (Note: Transferred to Gauhati High Court)	231 days	Madhya Pradesh	25 October 1999
2	Laxmi Kanta Mohapatra		10 July 2014	9 June 2016	1 year, 336 days	Orissa	16 January 1999
3	Rakesh Ranjan Prasad		22 September 2016	30 June 2017	282 days	Jharkhand	27 February 2006
4	Abhilasha Kumari		9 February 2018	23 February 2018	15 days	Himachal Pradesh	2 December 2005
5	Ramalingam Sudhakar		18 May 2018	13 February 2021	2 years, 272 days	Madras	10 December 2005
6	Puligoru Venkata Sanjay Kumar		14 February 2021	5 February 2023	1 year, 357 days	Telangana	8 August 2008
7	Siddharth Mridul		20 October 2023	21 November 2024	1 year, 33 days	Delhi	13 March 2008
8	Deivasigamani Krishnakumar		22 November 2024	21 May 2025	181 days	Madras	7 April 2016
9	Kempaiah Somashekar		22 May 2025	14 September 2025	116 days	Karnataka	14 November 2016

== Meghalaya High Court ==
The Meghalaya High Court was established on 23 March 2013 under the North-Eastern Areas (Reorganisation) and Other Related Laws (Amendment) Act, 2012 and has had 14 Chief Justices excluding Acting Chief Justices.

For Acting chief justices

#	Name	Portrait	Date of Appointment	Date of Retirement	Tenure	Parent High Court	Date of initial Appointment
1	Toom Meena Kumari		23 March 2013	3 August 2013	134 days	Andhra Pradesh	23 February 1998
2	Prafulla Chandra Pant		20 September 2013	12 August 2014	327 days	Uttarakhand	29 June 2004
3	Uma Nath Singh		19 March 2015	14 January 2016	302 days	Madhya Pradesh	22 October 2001
4	Dinesh Maheshwari		24 February 2016	11 February 2018 (Note: Transferred to Karnataka High Court)	1 year, 356 days	Rajasthan	2 September 2004
5	Tarun Agarwala		12 February 2018	2 March 2018	19 days	Allahabad	7 January 2004
6	Mohammad Yaqoob Mir		21 May 2018	27 May 2019	1 year, 7 days	Jammu & Kashmir	23 November 2007
7	Ajay Kumar Mittal		28 May 2019	2 November 2019 (Note: Transferred to Madhya Pradesh High Court)	159 days	Punjab & Haryana	9 January 2004
8	Mohammad Rafiq		13 November 2019	26 April 2020 (Note: Transferred to Orissa High Court)	166 days	Rajasthan	15 May 2006
9	Biswanath Somadder		27 April 2020	11 October 2021 (Note: Transferred to Sikkim High Court)	1 year, 168 days	Calcutta	22 June 2006
10	Ranjit Vasantrao More		12 October 2021	3 November 2021	23 days	Bombay	8 September 2006
11	Sanjib Banerjee		24 November 2021 (Note: CJ of Madras High Court transferred as CJ of Meghalaya)	1 November 2023	1 year, 343 days	Calcutta	22 June 2006
12	S. Vaidyanathan		11 February 2024	16 August 2024	188 days	Madras	25 October 2013
13	Indra Prasanna Mukerji		3 October 2024	5 September 2025	338 days	Calcutta	18 May 2009
14	Soumen Sen		8 October 2025	9 January 2026 (Note: Transferred to Kerala High Court)	94 days	Calcutta	13 April 2011

== Orissa High Court ==
The Orissa High Court was established on 3 April 1948 under the Orissa High Court Ordinance, 1948 and has had 35 Chief Justices and several Acting Chief Justices.

#	Name	Portrait	Date of Appointment	Date of Retirement	Tenure	Parent High Court	Date of initial Appointment	Notes
1	Bira Kishore Ray		26 July 1948	30 October 1951	3 years, 97 days	Patna	23 July 1945	
2	Bachu Jagannadha Das		30 October 1951	3 March 1953	1 year, 125 days	Orissa	26 July 1948	
3	Lingaraj Panigrahi		4 March 1953	20 March 1956	3 years, 17 days	Orissa	26 July 1948	
4 Expand	Ramaswamy Laxman Narasimham		21 March 1956	27 December 1964	8 years, 282 days	Orissa	26 July 1948	(Note: Transferred to Patna High Court)
--	S. B. Barman		28 December 1964	17 January 1965	21 days	Orissa	3 February 1958	
5	Khaleel Ahmed		18 January 1965	5 April 1967	2 years, 78 days	Patna	23 April 1951	
6	Satya Bhusan Barman		6 April 1967	30 April 1969	2 years, 25 days	Orissa	3 February 1958	
7	Gati Krushna Misra		1 May 1969	31 October 1975	6 years, 184 days	Orissa	30 January 1962	
8	Siba Narain Sankar		1 November 1975	12 October 1977	1 year, 346 days	Delhi	25 May 1967	
9	Sukanta Kishore Ray		13 October 1977	5 November 1980	3 years, 24 days	Orissa	25 October 1967	
10 Expand	Ranganath Mishra		16 January 1981	14 March 1983	2 years, 58 days	Orissa	4 July 1969	(Note: He became ACJ on 6 November 1980 and served till 15 January 1981 for 71 days before becoming permanent Chief Justice and later elevated to Supreme Court of India)
--	Prafulla Kishore Mohanti		14 March 1983	10 August 1983	150 days	Orissa	2 January 1974	
11 Expand	Dambarudhar Pathak		11 August 1983	28 February 1986	2 years, 202 days	Gauhati	8 August 1973	(Note: CJ of Gauhati High Court transferred as CJ of Orissa)
--	B. N. Misra		1 March 1986	30 April 1986	61 days	Orissa	5 January 1981	
12 Expand	Hari Lal Agrawal		1 May 1986	31 July 1989	3 years, 92 days	Patna	12 April 1973	
--	Radha Charan Pattnaik		1 August 1989	21 February 1990	205 days	Orissa	18 September 1981	
13	Banwari Lal Hansaria		22 February 1990	13 December 1993	3 years, 295 days	Gauhati	12 February 1979	
14	Girish Thakorlal Nanavati		31 January 1994	27 September 1994	240 days	Gujarat	19 July 1979	(Note: Nanavati was serving as Judge of Gujarat High Court when he was transferred as ACJ and served as such from 14 December 1993 till 30 January 1994 for 48 days before becoming permanent Chief Justice and subsequently transferred as CJ of Karnataka High Court)
15 Expand	Vallabhdas Aidan Mohta		28 September 1994	25 April 1995	210 days	Bombay	27 April 1979	
--	G. B. Pattanaik		26 April 1995	18 May 1995	23 days	Orissa	1 June 1983	(Note: Elevated as Chief Justice of Patna High Court)
--	Debi Priya Mohapatra		19 May 1995	15 February 1996	273 days	Orissa	18 November 1983	(Note: Elevated as Chief Justice of Allahabad High Court)
--	Susanta Chatterjee		16 February 1996	1 August 1996	168 days	Calcutta	17 January 1986	
16 Expand	Sailendu Nath Phukan		2 August 1996	27 January 1999	2 years, 179 days	Gauhati	11 October 1985	(Note: CJ of Himachal Pradesh High Court transferred as CJ of Orissa)
--	Susanta Chatterjee		28 January 1999	1 April 1999	64 days	Calcutta	17 January 1986	(Note: Retired as ACJ)
--	A. Pasayat		2 April 1999	20 September 1999	171 days	Orissa	20 March 1989	(Note: Elevated as Chief Justice of Kerala High Court)
--	R. K. Patra		21 September 1999	17 November 1999	58 days	Orissa	22 June 1992	
17 Expand	Biswanath Agrawal		18 November 1999	18 October 2000	336 days	Patna	17 November 1986	
--	R. K. Patra		19 October 2000	16 February 2001	121 days	Orissa	22 June 1992	
18 Expand	Nyaka Yellapa Hanumanthappa		17 February 2001	24 September 2001	220 days	Karnataka	29 March 1990	
--	R. K. Patra		25 September 2001	4 December 2001	71 days	Orissa	22 June 1992	
19	Perubhemba Krishna Ayer Balasubramanyan		5 December 2001	9 March 2003	1 year, 95 days	Kerala	4 June 1992	(Note: Transferred to Jharkhand High Court)
20	Sujit Barman Roy		10 March 2003	27 January 2007	3 years, 331 days	Gauhati	14 November 1991	
21 Expand	Ashok Kumar Ganguly		2 March 2007	18 May 2008	1 year, 78 days	Calcutta	10 January 1994	(Note: He became ACJ on 28 January 2007 and served till 1 March 2007 for 33 days before becoming permanent Chief Justice and later transferred as CJ to Madras High Court)
--	I. M. Quddusi		19 May 2008	15 July 2008	58 days	Allahabad	18 April 1995	
22 Expand	Balbir Singh Chauhan		16 July 2008	10 May 2009	299 days	Allahabad	5 April 1995	
--	I. M. Quddusi		11 May 2009	13 November 2009	187 days	Allahabad	18 April 1995	
23 Expand	Bilal Nazki		14 November 2009	17 November 2009	4 days	Jammu & Kashmir	6 January 1995	
--	I. M. Quddusi		18 November 2009	24 March 2010	127 days	Allahabad	18 April 1995	(Note: Transferred as Judge to Chhattisgarh High Court)
24 Expand	Venkate Gopala Gowda		25 March 2010	23 December 2012	2 years, 274 days	Karnataka	11 June 1997	
--	P. K. Mohanty		24 December 2012	26 February 2013	65 days	Orissa	7 March 2002	
25 Expand	Chokkalingam Nagappan		27 February 2013	18 September 2013	204 days	Madras	27 September 2000	
--	P. K. Mohanty		19 September 2013	11 October 2013	23 days	Orissa	7 March 2002	
26 Expand	Adarsh Kumar Goel		12 October 2013	6 July 2014	268 days	Punjab & Haryana	2 July 2001	
--	P. K. Mohanty		7 July 2014	5 August 2014	30 days	Orissa	7 March 2002	
27 Expand	Amitava Roy		6 August 2014	26 February 2015	205 days	Gauhati	4 February 2002	(Note: CJ of Rajasthan High Court transferred as CJ of Orissa)
--	P. K. Mohanty		27 February 2015	3 June 2015	97 days	Orissa	7 March 2002	
28 Expand	Dhirendra Hiralal Waghela		4 June 2015	14 February 2016	256 days	Gujarat	17 September 1999	(Note: CJ of Karnataka High Court transferred as CJ of Orissa and subsequently transferred as CJ to Bombay High Court)
--	P. K. Mohanty		15 February 2016	25 February 2016	11 days	Orissa	7 March 2002	
29 Expand	Vineet Saran		26 February 2016	6 August 2018	2 years, 162 days	Allahabad	14 February 2002	
--	Indrajit Mahanty		7 August 2018	11 August 2018	5 days	Orissa	31 March 2006	
30 Expand	Kalpesh Satyendra Jhaveri		12 August 2018	4 January 2020	1 year, 146 days	Gujarat	7 March 2004	
--	Sanju Panda		5 January 2020	26 April 2020	113 days	Orissa	1 March 2007	
31	Mohammad Rafiq		27 April 2020	3 January 2021	252 days	Rajasthan	15 May 2006	(Note: CJ of Meghalaya High Court transferred as CJ of Orissa and subsequently transferred as CJ to Madhya Pradesh High Court)
32	S. Muralidhar		4 January 2021	7 August 2023	2 years, 216 days	Delhi	29 May 2006	
33 Expand	Subhasis Talapatra		8 August 2023	3 October 2023	57 days	Tripura	15 November 2011	
--	B. R. Sarangi		4 October 2023	6 February 2024	126 days	Orissa	20 June 2013	
34 Expand	Chakradhari Sharan Singh		7 February 2024	19 January 2025	348 days	Patna	5 April 2012	
--	Arindam Sinha		20 January 2025	25 March 2025	65 days	Calcutta	30 October 2013	
35	Harish Tandon		26 March 2025	15 November 2026	1 year, 235 days	Calcutta	13 April 2010	

== Patna High Court ==
The Patna High Court was established on 9 February 1916 under Letters Patent issued by the British Crown and has had 48 permanent Chief Justices and several Acting Chief Justices. Website of Bihar State Legal Services Authority contains list of its former patron in chiefs who always had been the chief justice of Patna High Court (whether acting or permanent). Thus the list contained in this website would serve as primary reference for acting chief justices after 1999.

#	Name	Portrait	Date of Appointment	Date of Retirement	Tenure	Parent High Court	Date of initial Appointment	Notes
1	Edward Maynard Des Champs Chamier		1 March 1916	30 October 1917	1 year, 244 days	Allahabad	1910	
2	Thomas Fredrick Dawson Miller		31 October 1917	30 March 1928	10 years, 152 days	Bar	--	
3 Expand	Courtney Terrell		31 March 1928	6 May 1938^{[‡]}	10 years, 37 days	Bar	--	
--	Fazl Ali		7 May 1938	9 October 1938	156 days	Patna	11 April 1928	
4	Arthur Trevor Harries		10 October 1938	18 January 1943	4 years, 101 days	Allahabad	1934	(Note: Transferred to Lahore High Court)
5	Saiyid Fazl Ali		19 January 1943	14 October 1946	3 years, 269 days	Patna	11 April 1928	(Note: Elevated to Federal Court of India on 9 June 1947 after retiring as High Court Judge on 14 October 1946)
6	Clifford Monmohan Agarwala		9 January 1948	24 January 1950^{[‡]}	2 years, 16 days	Patna	11 July 1933	(Note: He became ACJ on 15 October 1946 and served till 8 January 1948 for 1 year, 86 days before becoming permanent Chief Justice)
7	Herbert Ribton Meredith		25 January 1950	7 April 1950	73 days	Patna	1 October 1940	
8	Pandit Lakshami Kant Jha		8 April 1950	31 May 1952	2 years, 54 days	Bar	--	
9	David Ezra Reuben		1 June 1952	2 September 1953	1 year, 94 days	Patna	14 August 1943	
10	Syed Jafar Imam		3 September 1953	9 January 1955	1 year, 129 days	Patna	25 October 1943	
11	Sudhansu Kumar Das		10 January 1955	29 April 1956	1 year, 111 days	Patna	4 November 1944	
12	Vaidyanathier Ramaswami		30 April 1956	3 January 1965	8 years, 249 days	Patna	1 November 1947	
13	Ramaswamy Laxman Narasimham		4 January 1965	2 August 1968	3 years, 212 days	Orissa	26 July 1948	(Note: CJ of Orissa High Court transferred as CJ of Patna)
14	Satish Chandra Mishra		9 November 1968	4 September 1970	1 year, 300 days	Patna	11 December 1952	(Note: He became ACJ on 3 August 1968 and served till 8 November 1968 for 98 days before becoming permanent Chief Justice)
15	Ujjal Narayan Sinha		5 September 1970	28 September 1972	2 years, 24 days	Patna	29 October 1957	
16	Nand Lall Untwalia		29 September 1972	2 October 1974	2 years, 4 days	Patna	2 January 1958	
17	Shyam Nandan Prasad Singh		3 October 1974	30 April 1976	1 year, 211 days	Patna	1 December 1959	
18 Expand	Krishna Ballabh Narayan Singh		19 July 1976	12 March 1982	5 years, 237 days	Patna	15 November 1966	(Note: He became ACJ on 1 May 1976 and served till 18 July 1976 for 79 days before becoming permanent Chief Justice and later transferred as CJ to Madras High Court)
--	Syed Sarwar Ali		13 March 1982	28 November 1983	1 year, 261 days	Patna	6 April 1970	
19	Surjit Singh Sandhawalia		29 November 1983	27 July 1987	3 years, 241 days	Punjab & Haryana	28 May 1968	(Note: CJ of Punjab & Haryana High Court transferred as CJ of Patna)
20 Expand	Bhagwati Prasad Jha		2 January 1988	2 January 1988	1 day	Patna	12 April 1973	(Note: He became ACJ on 28 July 1987 and served till 1 January 1988 for 158 days before becoming permanent Chief Justice)
--	S. K. Jha		3 January 1988	30 April 1988	119 days	Patna	12 April 1973	
21	Dipak Kumar Sen		1 May 1988	1 May 1989	1 year, 1 day	Calcutta	5 March 1973	
22	Shushil Kumar Jha		19 October 1989	23 October 1989	5 days	Patna	12 April 1973	(Note: He became ACJ on 2 May 1989 and served till 18 October 1989 for 170 days before becoming permanent Chief Justice and later transferred as CJ to Madhya Pradesh High Court)
23 Expand	Gangadhar Ganesh Sohani		24 October 1989	17 December 1990	1 year, 55 days	Madhya Pradesh	2 June 1973	(Note: CJ of Madhya Pradesh High Court transferred as CJ of Patna)
--	N. P. Singh		18 December 1990	3 February 1991	48 days	Patna	12 April 1973	(Note: Elevated as Chief Justice of Calcutta High Court)
24	Bimal Chandra Basak		18 March 1991	21 January 1994	2 years, 310 days	Calcutta	10 June 1974	
25	Krishnaswami Sundara Paripoornan		24 January 1994	10 June 1994	141 days	Kerala	23 December 1982	
26 Expand	Konduswami Venkataswamy		19 June 1994	5 March 1995	260 days	Madras	24 July 1983	
--	B. L. Yadav		6 March 1995	18 May 1995	74 days	Allahabad	24 May 1984	
27	Gopal Ballav Pattanaik		19 May 1995	10 September 1995	115 days	Orissa	1 June 1983	
28 Expand	Devinder Pratap Wadhwa		29 September 1995	20 March 1997	1 year, 173 days	Delhi	12 August 1983	
--	J. N. Dubey		21 March 1997	8 July 1997	110 days	Allahabad	24 May 1984	
29 Expand	Brij Mohan Lal		9 July 1997	6 October 1999	2 years, 90 days	Madhya Pradesh	14 May 1984	
--	B. N. Agrawal		7 October 1999	17 November 1999	42 days	Patna	17 November 1986	(Note: Elevated as Chief Justice of Orissa High Court)
--	B. P. Singh		18 November 1999	24 January 2000	68 days	Patna	9 March 1987	
30 Expand	Ravi Swaroop Dhavan		25 January 2000	22 July 2004	4 years, 180 days	Allahabad	9 January 1986	
--	Nagendra Rai		22 July 2004	17 July 2005	361 days	Patna	10 July 1990	
31 Expand	Jitendrakumar Nanalal Bhatt		18 July 2005	16 October 2007	2 years, 91 days	Gujarat	21 June 1990	
--	Narayan Roy		16 October 2007	4 January 2008	81 days	Patna	2 December 1991	(Note: Elevated as Chief Justice of Rajasthan High Court)
32 Expand	Rajesh Balia		5 January 2008	3 March 2008	59 days	Rajasthan	21 October 1991	
--	C. K. Prasad		4 March 2008	12 May 2008	70 days	Patna	2 December 1991	
33 Expand	Rajendra Mal Lodha		13 May 2008	16 December 2008	218 days	Rajasthan	31 January 1994	
--	C. K. Prasad		17 December 2008	15 March 2009	89 days	Patna	8 November 1994	(Note: Elevated as Chief Justice of Allahabad High Court)
34 Expand	Jacob Benjamin Koshy		16 March 2009	12 May 2009	58 days	Kerala	17 January 1996	
--	S. K. Singh		13 May 2009	11 August 2009	91 days	Patna	29 December 1998	
35 Expand	Prafulla Kumar Mishra		12 August 2009	16 September 2009	36 days	Orissa	17 January 1996	
--	S. K. Singh		17 September 2009	22 December 2009	97 days	Patna	29 December 1998	
36 Expand	Dipak Misra		23 December 2009	23 May 2010	152 days	Orissa	17 January 1996	(Note: Transferred to Delhi High Court)
--	S. K. Singh		24 May 2010	20 June 2010	28 days	Patna	29 December 1998	
37 Expand	Rekha Manharlal Doshit		21 June 2010	12 December 2014	4 years, 175 days	Gujarat	18 September 1995	
--	I. A. Ansari		13 December 2014	1 January 2015	20 days	Gauhati	4 March 2002	
38	Lingala Narasimha Reddy		2 January 2015	31 July 2015	211 days	Andhra Pradesh	10 September 2001	
39 Expand	Iqbal Ahmed Ansari		29 July 2016	28 October 2016	92 days	Gauhati	4 March 2002	(Note: He became ACJ on 1 August 2015 and served till 28 July 2016 for 363 days before becoming permanent Chief Justice)
--	Hemant Gupta		29 October 2016	14 March 2017	137 days	Punjab & Haryana	2 July 2002	(Note: Elevated as Chief Justice of Madhya Pradesh High Court)
40 Expand	Rajendra Menon		15 March 2017	8 August 2018	1 year, 147 days	Madhya Pradesh	1 April 2002	
--	Ravi Ranjan		9 August 2018	11 August 2018	3 days	Patna	14 July 2008	
41 Expand	Mukesh Rasikbhai Shah		12 August 2018	1 November 2018	82 days	Gujarat	7 March 2004	
--	Ravi Ranjan		2 November 2018	16 November 2018	15 days	Patna	14 July 2008	
42	Amreshwar Pratap Sahi		17 November 2018	10 November 2019	359 days	Allahabad	24 September 2004	(Note: Transferred to Madras High Court)
43 Expand	Sanjay Karol		11 November 2019	5 February 2023	3 years, 87 days	Himachal Pradesh	8 March 2007	(Note: CJ of Tripura High Court transferred as CJ of Patna)
--	C. S. Singh		6 February 2023	28 March 2023	51 days	Patna	5 April 2012	
44 Expand	Krishnan Vinod Chandran		29 March 2023	15 January 2025	1 year, 293 days	Kerala	8 November 2011	
--	Ashutosh Kumar		16 January 2025	20 July 2025	186 days	Patna	15 May 2014	(Note: Elevated as Chief Justice of Gauhati High Court)
45	Vipul Manubhai Pancholi		21 July 2025	28 August 2025	39 days	Gujarat	1 October 2014	
46 Expand	Pavankumar Bhimappa Bajanthri		21 September 2025	22 October 2025	32 days	Karnataka	2 January 2015	(Note: He became ACJ on 29 August 2025 and served till 20 September 2025 for 23 days before becoming permanent Chief Justice)
--	Sudhir Singh		23 October 2025	6 January 2026	76 days	Patna	15 April 2015	
47	Sangam Kumar Sahoo		7 January 2026	4 June 2026	149 days	Orissa	2 July 2014	
48 Expand	Meenakshi Madan Rai		5 June 2026	11 July 2026	37 days	Sikkim	15 April 2015	
--	Sudhir Singh		12 July 2026	12 September 2026	63 days	Patna	15 April 2015	

== Punjab and Haryana High Court ==
The Punjab and Haryana High Court was established on 15 August 1947 under the Punjab High Court Ordinance, 1947 and has had 36 permanent Chief Justices and several Acting Chief Justices.

#	Name	Portrait	Date of Appointment	Date of Retirement	Tenure	Parent High Court	Date of initial Appointment	Notes
1	Ram Lall		15 August 1947	18 January 1949	1 year, 157 days	Lahore (Note: Before independence Lahore High Court has jurisdiction over Punjab, India after independence new High Court for Punjab was created and Indian judges from Lahore High Court was transferred to it.)	9 February 1938	
2	Sudhi Ranjan Das		19 January 1949	20 January 1950	1 year, 2 days	Calcutta	1 December 1942	(Note: Then known as Federal Court of India)
3	Eric Weston		21 January 1950	8 December 1952	2 years, 323 days	Bombay	14 January 1943	
4	Amar Nath Bhandari		8 December 1952	18 November 1959^{[‡]}	6 years, 346 days	Lahore	1944	
5	Gopal Das Khosla		19 November 1959	14 December 1961	2 years, 26 days	Lahore	1 November 1944	
6	Donald Falshaw		15 December 1961	29 May 1966^{[‡]}	4 years, 166 days	Lahore	26 September 1946	
7	Mehar Singh		30 May 1966	14 August 1970	4 years, 77 days	Punjab & Haryana	24 December 1953	
8	Harbans Singh		15 August 1970	8 April 1974	3 years, 237 days	Punjab & Haryana	11 August 1958	
9	Daya Krishan Mahajan		10 April 1974	10 May 1974	31 days	Punjab & Haryana	11 May 1959	
10	Ranjit Singh Narula		11 May 1974	31 October 1977^{[‡]}	3 years, 174 days	Punjab & Haryana	1 April 1965	
11	Anand Dev Koshal		1 November 1977	16 July 1978	258 days	Punjab & Haryana	28 May 1968	
12	Surjit Singh Sandhawalia		17 July 1978	28 November 1983	5 years, 135 days	Punjab & Haryana	28 May 1968	(Note: Transferred to Patna High Court)
13	Prem Chand Jain		1 August 1985	17 August 1986	1 year, 17 days	Punjab & Haryana	24 June 1968	(Note: He became ACJ on 28 November 1983 and served till 31 July 1985 for 1 year, 246 days before becoming permanent Chief Justice and later transferred as CJ to Karnataka High Court)
14	Hariday Nath Seth		18 August 1986	14 October 1987	1 year, 58 days	Allahabad	7 July 1969	(Note: CJ of Allahabad High Court transferred as CJ of Punjab & Haryana)
15 Expand	Debi Singh Tewatia		15 October 1987	29 October 1987	15 days	Punjab & Haryana	6 February 1970	(Note: Transferred to Calcutta High Court)
--	R. N. Mittal		30 October 1987	11 November 1987	13 days	Punjab & Haryana	24 February 1972	
16	Veeraswami Ramaswami		12 November 1987	6 October 1989	1 year, 329 days	Madras	31 January 1971	
17	Shanti Sarup Dewan		24 October 1989	31 December 1989	69 days	Punjab & Haryana	14 December 1977	(Note: He became ACJ on 6 October 1989 and served till 23 October 1989 for 18 days before becoming permanent Chief Justice)
18 Expand	Jitendra Vir Gupta		9 July 1990	1 May 1991^{[‡]}	297 days	Punjab & Haryana	19 February 1979	(Note: He became ACJ on 1 January 1990 and served till 8 July 1990 for 189 days before becoming permanent Chief Justice)
--	Gokal Chand Mittal		2 May 1991	4 August 1991	95 days	Punjab & Haryana	19 February 1979	(Note: Elevated as Chief Justice of Delhi High Court)
--	Iqbal Singh Tiwana		5 August 1991	19 September 1991	46 days	Punjab & Haryana	11 June 1979	
19	Bipin Chandra Verma		19 September 1991	2 May 1992	227 days	Madhya Pradesh	21 August 1978	
20 Expand	Mandagadde Rama Jois		3 May 1992	31 August 1992^{[‡]}	121 days	Karnataka	28 November 1977	
--	Sarvinder Singh Sodhi		1 September 1992	12 November 1992	73 days	Punjab & Haryana	18 June 1982	
21	Sudarshan Dayal Aggarwal		13 November 1992	14 January 1994	1 year, 63 days	Allahabad	17 November 1977	
22 Expand	Sudhakar Panditrao Kurdukar		16 January 1994	27 March 1996	2 years, 72 days	Bombay	25 April 1978	
--	R. P. Sethi		27 March 1996	27 June 1996	93 days	Jammu & Kashmir	30 May 1986	(Note: Elevated as Chief Justice of Karnataka High Court)
--	M. S. Liberhan		27 June 1996	30 July 1996	34 days	Punjab & Haryana	11 February 1987	
23 Expand	Kumaran Sreedharan		30 July 1996	18 October 1997	1 year, 81 days	Kerala	10 September 1985	(Note: Transferred to Gujarat High Court)
--	Amarjeet Chaudhary		19 October 1997	7 November 1997	20 days	Punjab & Haryana	27 June 1988	
24 Expand	Arun B. Saharya		7 November 1997	14 September 2002	4 years, 312 days	Delhi	24 April 1986	
--	G. S. Singhvi		15 September 2002	14 October 2002	30 days	Rajasthan	20 July 1990	
25 Expand	Binod Kumar Roy		14 October 2002	21 February 2005	2 years, 131 days	Patna	31 October 1988	(Note: Transferred to Gauhati High Court)
--	G. S. Singhvi		21 February 2005	25 February 2005	5 days	Rajasthan	20 July 1990	(Note: Transferred as Judge to Gujarat High Court)
--	H. S. Bedi		26 February 2005	11 March 2005	14 days	Punjab & Haryana	15 March 1991	
26 Expand	Devinder Kumar Jain		11 March 2005	9 April 2006	1 year, 30 days	Delhi	19 March 1991	
--	H. S. Bedi		10 April 2006	2 October 2006	176 days	Punjab & Haryana	15 March 1991	(Note: Elevated as Chief Justice of Bombay High Court)
--	S. S. Nijjar		3 October 2006	28 November 2006	57 days	Punjab & Haryana	8 April 1996	
27 Expand	Vijender Jain		28 November 2006	1 August 2008	1 year, 248 days	Delhi	24 December 1992	
--	J. S. Khehar	J. S. Khehar	2 August 2008	10 August 2008	9 days	Punjab & Haryana	8 February 1999	
28 Expand	Tirath Singh Thakur		11 August 2008	16 November 2009	1 year, 98 days	Jammu & Kashmir	16 February 1994	
--	J. S. Khehar		17 November 2009	28 November 2009	12 days	Punjab & Haryana	8 February 1999	(Note: Elevated as Chief Justice of Uttarakhand High Court)
--	Mehtab Singh Gill		29 November 2009	5 December 2009	7 days	Punjab & Haryana	14 May 1999	
29	Mukul Mudgal		5 December 2009	3 January 2011	1 year, 30 days	Delhi	2 March 1998	
30 Expand	Ranjan Gogoi		12 February 2011	22 April 2012	1 year, 71 days	Gauhati	28 February 2001	(Note: He became ACJ on 4 January 2011 and served till 11 February 2011 for 39 days before becoming permanent Chief Justice and later elevated to Supreme Court of India)
--	M. M. Kumar		23 April 2012	8 June 2012	47 days	Punjab & Haryana	2 July 2001	(Note: Elevated as Chief Justice of Jammu & Kashmir High Court)
--	Jasbir Singh		9 June 2012	23 September 2012	107 days	Punjab & Haryana	2 July 2001	
31 Expand	Arjan Kumar Sikri		23 September 2012	11 April 2013	201 days	Delhi	7 July 1999	
--	Jasbir Singh		12 April 2013	31 May 2013	50 days	Punjab & Haryana	2 July 2001	
32 Expand	Sanjay Kishan Kaul		1 June 2013	25 July 2014	1 year, 55 days	Delhi	3 May 2001	(Note: Transferred to Madras High Court)
--	Ashutosh Mohunta		26 July 2014	15 December 2014	143 days	Punjab & Haryana	2 July 2001	
33 Expand	Shiavax Jal Vazifdar		7 August 2016	3 May 2018	1 year, 270 days	Bombay	22 January 2001	(Note: Vazifdar was serving as Judge of Bombay High Court when he was transferred as ACJ and served as such from 15 December 2014 till 6 August 2016 for 1 year, 236 days before becoming permanent Chief Justice)
--	A. K. Mittal		4 May 2018	2 June 2018	30 days	Punjab & Haryana	9 January 2004	
34 Expand	Krishna Murari		2 June 2018	22 September 2019	1 year, 113 days	Allahabad	7 January 2004	
--	Rajeev Sharma		23 September 2019	5 October 2019	13 days	Himachal Pradesh	3 April 2007	
35 Expand	Ravi Shankar Jha		6 October 2019	13 October 2023	4 years, 8 days	Madhya Pradesh	18 October 2005	
--	Ritu Bahri		14 October 2023	3 February 2024	112 days	Punjab & Haryana	16 August 2010	
--	G. S. Sandhawalia		4 February 2024	8 July 2024	156 days	Punjab & Haryana	30 September 2011	
36	Sheel Nagu		9 July 2024	1 June 2026	1 year, 328 days	Madhya Pradesh	27 May 2011	

== Rajasthan High Court ==
The Rajasthan High Court was established on 21 June 1949 under the Rajasthan High Court Ordinance, 1949 and has had 43 permanent Chief Justices and several Acting Chief Justices. Website of Rajasthan State Legal Services Authority contains list of its former patron in chiefs who always had been the chief justice of Rajasthan High Court (whether acting or permanent). Thus the list contained in this website would serve as primary reference for acting chief justices after 1997.

#	Name	Portrait	Date of Appointment	Date of Retirement	Tenure	Parent High Court	Date of Appointment	Notes
1 Expand	Kamalkanta Verma		29 August 1949	24 January 1950	149 days	Allahabad	1937	(Note: Initially CJ of Allahabad High Court then transferred to High Court of princely state of Udaipur and then appointed as CJ of Rajasthan)
--	Nawal Kishore		25 January 1950	1 January 1951	342 days	Rajasthan	29 August 1949	
2 Expand	Kailas Nath Wanchoo		2 January 1951	10 August 1958	7 years, 221 days	Allahabad	17 February 1947	
--	Kanwar Lal Bapna		11 August 1958	27 February 1959	201 days	Rajasthan	29 August 1949	
3	Sarjoo Prasad		28 February 1959	10 October 1961	2 years, 225 days	Patna	13 January 1950	(Note: CJ of Gauhati High Court transferred as CJ of Rajasthan)
4	Jawan Singh Ranawat		11 October 1961	31 May 1963	1 year, 233 days	Rajasthan	29 August 1949	
5	Durga Shakti Dave		1 June 1963	17 December 1968	5 years, 200 days	Rajasthan	29 August 1949	(Note: Appointed as judge on 29 August 1949 and served till 25 January 1951. Reappointed as permanent judge on 12 July 1952 and served till his retirement as chief justice on 17 December 1968)
6	Daulat Mal Bhandari		18 December 1968	15 December 1969	363 days	Rajasthan	26 July 1955	
7	Jagat Narayan		16 December 1969	13 February 1973	3 years, 60 days	Rajasthan	20 January 1958	
8	Bhagwati Prasad Beri		14 February 1973	16 February 1975	2 years, 3 days	Rajasthan	16 August 1960	
9	Prakash Narayan Shinghal		17 February 1975	5 November 1975	262 days	Rajasthan	21 June 1961	
10 Expand	Vedpal Tyagi		6 November 1975	27 December 1977	2 years, 52 days	Rajasthan	13 September 1962	
--	A. P. Sen		28 December 1977	28 February 1978	63 days	Madhya Pradesh	7 November 1967	(Note: Elevated as Chief Justice of Madhya Pradesh High Court)
--	Mohan Lal Joshi		1 March 1978	26 April 1978	57 days	Rajasthan	22 November 1971	
11 Expand	Closepet Honniah		27 April 1978	22 September 1978	149 days	Karnataka	15 March 1965	
--	Mohan Lal Joshi		23 September 1978	11 March 1979	170 days	Rajasthan	22 November 1971	
12	Chand Mal Lodha		12 March 1979	9 July 1980	1 year, 120 days	Rajasthan	22 November 1967	
13	Kalyan Dutt Sharma		7 January 1981	22 October 1983	2 years, 289 days	Rajasthan	20 July 1973	(Note: He became ACJ on 10 July 1980 and served till 6 January 1981 for 181 days before becoming permanent Chief Justice)
14	Pradyot Kumar Banerjee		23 October 1983	30 September 1985	1 year, 343 days	Calcutta	31 July 1968	
15 Expand	Dwarka Prasad Gupta		12 April 1986	31 July 1986	111 days	Rajasthan	24 September 1973	(Note: He became ACJ on 1 October 1985 and served till 11 April 1986 for 193 days before becoming permanent Chief Justice)
--	G. M. Lodha		1 August 1986	31 August 1986	31 days	Rajasthan	1 May 1978	
16 Expand	Jagdish Sharan Verma		1 September 1986	22 May 1989	2 years, 264 days	Madhya Pradesh	12 September 1972	(Note: CJ of Madhya Pradesh High Court transferred as CJ of Rajasthan)
--	M. C. Jain		23 May 1989	14 April 1990	327 days	Rajasthan	15 June 1978	
17	Krishna Chandra Agarwal		15 April 1990	7 April 1994	3 years, 358 days	Allahabad	6 August 1973	(Note: Transferred to Calcutta High Court)
18	Gokal Chand Mittal		12 April 1994	3 March 1995	326 days	Punjab & Haryana	19 February 1979	(Note: CJ of Delhi High Court transferred as CJ of Rajasthan)
19	Amratlal Parmananddas Ravani		4 April 1995	10 September 1996^{[‡]}	1 year, 160 days	Gujarat	26 May 1982	
20 Expand	Mukul Gopal Mukherjee		19 September 1996	24 December 1997	1 year, 97 days	Calcutta	9 January 1984	
--	Maheshwari Prasad Singh		25 December 1997	9 April 1998	107 days	Allahabad	31 July 1987	(Note: Retired as ACJ)
--	N. L. Tibrewal		10 April 1998	25 May 1998	46 days	Rajasthan	20 July 1990	(Note: Appointed as Acting Governor of Rajasthan)
--	V. S. Kokje		25 May 1998	15 January 1999	236 days	Madhya Pradesh	28 July 1990	
--	N. L. Tibrewal		16 January 1999	17 January 1999	2 days	Rajasthan	20 July 1990	(Note: Reverted from position of Acting Governor to ACJ and subsequently retired as ACJ)
--	V. S. Kokje		17 January 1999	21 January 1999	5 days	Madhya Pradesh	28 July 1990	
21 Expand	Shivaraj Virupanna Patil		22 January 1999	14 March 2000	1 year, 53 days	Karnataka	29 March 1990	
--	V. S. Kokje		15 March 2000	28 May 2000	75 days	Madhya Pradesh	28 July 1990	
22 Expand	Arunachalam R. Lakshmanan		29 May 2000	25 November 2001	1 year, 181 days	Madras	14 June 1990	(Note: Transferred to Undivided Andhra Pradesh High Court)
--	Megh Raj Calla		26 November 2001	1 December 2001	6 days	Rajasthan	20 July 1990	
23 Expand	Arun Kumar		2 December 2001	2 October 2002	305 days	Delhi	13 July 1990	
--	Megh Raj Calla		3 October 2002	23 December 2002	82 days	Rajasthan	20 July 1990	
24 Expand	Anil Dev Singh		24 December 2002	22 October 2004	1 year, 304 days	Delhi	13 July 1990	
--	Y. R. Meena		23 October 2004	11 October 2005	354 days	Rajasthan	20 July 1990	
25 Expand	Sachchidanand Jha		12 October 2005	15 June 2007	1 year, 247 days	Patna	10 July 1990	(Note: CJ of Jammu & Kashmir High Court transferred as CJ of Rajasthan)
--	Rajesh Balia		16 June 2007	15 July 2007	30 days	Rajasthan	21 October 1991	
26 Expand	Jagdish Madhurlal Panchal		16 September 2007	11 November 2007	57 days	Gujarat	22 November 1990	(Note: Panchal was serving as Judge of Gujarat High Court when he was transferred as ACJ and served as such from 16 July 2007 to 15 September 2007 for 62 days before becoming permanent Chief Justice and later elevated to Supreme Court of India)
--	Rajesh Balia		12 November 2007	4 January 2008	54 days	Rajasthan	21 October 1991	(Note: Elevated as Chief Justice of Patna High Court)
27 Expand	Narayan Roy		5 January 2008	31 January 2009	1 year, 27 days	Patna	2 December 1991	
--	Rattan Chand Gandhi		1 February 2009	5 March 2009	33 days	Jammu & Kashmir	6 January 1995	
28 Expand	Deepak Verma		6 March 2009	10 May 2009	69 days	Madhya Pradesh	15 December 1994	
--	Rattan Chand Gandhi		11 May 2009	9 August 2009	91 days	Jammu & Kashmir	6 January 1995	
29	Jagadish Bhalla		10 August 2009	31 October 2010	1 year, 83 days	Allahabad	5 April 1995	(Note: CJ of Himachal Pradesh High Court transferred as CJ of Rajasthan)
30 Expand	Arun Mishra		26 November 2010	13 December 2012	2 years, 18 days	Madhya Pradesh	25 October 1999	(Note: He became ACJ on 1 November 2010 and served till 25 November 2010 for 25 days before becoming permanent Chief Justice and later transferred as CJ to Calcutta High Court)
--	Narendra Kumar Jain		14 December 2012	2 January 2013	20 days	Rajasthan	2 September 2004	
31	Amitava Roy		2 January 2013	5 August 2014	1 year, 216 days	Gauhati	4 February 2002	(Note: Transferred to Orissa High Court)
32 Expand	Sunil Ambwani		24 March 2015	22 August 2015	152 days	Allahabad	24 April 2001	(Note: He became ACJ on 6 August 2014 and served till 23 March 2015 for 230 days before becoming permanent Chief Justice)
--	Ajit Singh		23 August 2015	4 March 2016	196 days	Madhya Pradesh	1 April 2002	(Note: Elevated as Chief Justice of Gauhati High Court)
33 Expand	Satish Kumar Mittal		5 March 2016	14 April 2016	41 days	Punjab & Haryana	2 July 2002	
--	Ajay Rastogi		15 April 2016	13 May 2016	29 days	Rajasthan	2 September 2004	
34 Expand	Navin Sinha		14 May 2016	16 February 2017	279 days	Patna	11 February 2004	(Note: CJ of Chhattisgarh High Court transferred as CJ of Rajasthan)
--	K. S. Jhaveri		17 February 2017	1 April 2017	44 days	Gujarat	7 March 2004	
35 Expand	Pradeep Nandrajog		2 April 2017	6 April 2019	2 years, 5 days	Delhi	20 December 2002	(Note: Transferred to Bombay High Court)
--	Mohammad Rafiq		7 April 2019	4 May 2019	28 days	Rajasthan	15 May 2006	
36 Expand	Shripathi Ravindra Bhat		5 May 2019	23 September 2019	142 days	Delhi	16 July 2004	
--	Mohammad Rafiq		23 September 2019	5 October 2019	13 days	Rajasthan	15 May 2006	
37	Indrajit Mahanty		6 October 2019	11 October 2021	2 years, 6 days	Orissa	31 March 2006	(Note: Transferred to Tripura High Court)
38 Expand	Akil Abdulhamid Kureshi		12 October 2021	6 March 2022	146 days	Gujarat	7 March 2004	(Note: CJ of Tripura High Court transferred as CJ of Rajasthan)
--	M. M. Shrivastava		7 March 2022	20 June 2022	106 days	Chhattisgarh	10 December 2009	
39 Expand	Sambhaji Shiwaji Shinde		21 June 2022	1 August 2022	42 days	Bombay	17 March 2008	
--	M. M. Shrivastava		2 August 2022	13 October 2022	47 days	Chhattisgarh	10 December 2009	
40 Expand	Pankaj Mithal		14 October 2022	5 February 2023	115 days	Allahabad	7 July 2006	
--	M. M. Shrivastava		6 February 2023	29 May 2023	113 days	Chhattisgarh	10 December 2009	
41	Augustine George Masih		30 May 2023	8 November 2023	163 days	Punjab & Haryana	10 July 2008	
42	Manindra Mohan Shrivastava		6 February 2024	20 July 2025	1 year, 165 days	Chhattisgarh	10 December 2009	(Note: He became ACJ on 9 November 2023 and served till 5 February 2024 for 89 days before becoming permanent Chief Justice and later transferred as CJ to Madras High Court)
43 Expand	Kalpathi Rajendran Shriram		21 July 2025	27 September 2025	69 days	Bombay	21 June 2013	(Note: CJ of Madras High Court transferred as CJ of Rajasthan)
--	S. P. Sharma		28 September 2025	6 September 2026	344 days	Rajasthan	16 November 2016	

== Sikkim High Court ==
The Sikkim High Court was established on 16 May 1975 under the 36th Amendment to the Indian Constitution and has had 23 Chief Justices excluding Acting Chief Justices.

For Acting chief justices

#	Name	Portrait	Date of Appointment	Date of Retirement	Tenure	Parent High Court	Date of initial Appointment
1	Manmohan Singh Gujral		7 May 1976	14 March 1983	6 years, 312 days	Punjab & Haryana	21 August 1969
2	Mohan Lall Shrimal		17 December 1983	3 January 1985	1 year, 18 days	Rajasthan	7 October 1974
3	Jugal Kishore Mohanty		21 January 1986	4 January 1989	2 years, 350 days	Orissa	12 July 1978
4	Braja Nath Misra		20 January 1990	8 November 1992	2 years, 294 days	Orissa	5 January 1981
5	Surendra Nath Bhargava		20 January 1993	10 February 1996	3 years, 22 days	Rajasthan	20 October 1982
6	Krishna Murari Agarwal		15 February 1996	26 October 1996	255 days	Madhya Pradesh	14 May 1984
7	Kanniappa Arumuga Thanikkachallam		27 August 1997	26 September 1997	31 days	Madras	14 August 1988
8	Repusudan Dayal		3 February 1999	17 May 2003	4 years, 104 days	Sikkim	10 May 1984
9	Radha Krishna Patra		9 July 2003	23 November 2004	1 year, 138 days	Orissa	22 June 1992
10	Binod Kumar Roy		30 September 2005 (Note: CJ of Gauhati High Court transferred as CJ of Sikkim)	26 December 2006	1 year, 88 days	Patna	31 October 1988
11	Ajoy Nath Ray		27 January 2007 (Note: CJ of Allahabad High Court transferred as CJ of Sikkim)	30 October 2008	1 year, 278 days	Calcutta	6 August 1990
12	Aftab Hussain Saikia		7 March 2009	7 April 2010 (Note: Transferred to Jammu and Kashmir High Court)	1 year, 32 days	Gauhati	15 November 2000
13	Barin Ghosh		13 April 2010 (Note: CJ of Jammu & Kashmir High Court transferred as CJ of Sikkim)	5 August 2010 (Note: Transferred to Uttarakhand High Court)	115 days	Calcutta	14 July 1995
14	Paul Daniel Dinakaran Premkumar		9 August 2010 (Note: CJ of Karnataka High Court transferred as CJ of Sikkim)	29 July 2011^{[‡]}	355 days	Madras	19 December 1996
15	Permod Kohli		12 December 2011	28 February 2013	1 year, 79 days	Jammu & Kashmir	7 January 2003
16	Pius Chakkalayil Kuriakose		28 March 2013	1 October 2013	188 days	Kerala	9 September 2002
17	Narendra Kumar Jain		7 January 2014	7 October 2014	274 days	Rajasthan	2 September 2004
18	Sunil Kumar Sinha		30 March 2015	6 July 2016	1 year, 99 days	Chhattisgarh	1 December 2004
19	Satish Kumar Agnihotri		22 September 2016	30 June 2018	1 year, 282 days	Chhattisgarh	5 May 2005
20	Vijay Kumar Bist		30 October 2018	16 September 2019	322 days	Uttarakhand	1 November 2008
21	Arup Kumar Goswami		15 October 2019	5 January 2021 (Note: Transferred to Andhra Pradesh High Court)	1 year, 83 days	Gauhati	24 January 2011
22	Jitendra Kumar Maheshwari		6 January 2021 (Note: CJ of Andhra Pradesh High Court transferred as CJ of Sikkim)	30 August 2021	237 days	Madhya Pradesh	25 November 2005
23	Biswanath Somadder		12 October 2021 (Note: CJ of Meghalaya High Court transferred as CJ of Sikkim)	14 December 2025	4 years, 64 days	Calcutta	22 June 2006

== Telangana High Court ==
The Telangana High Court was established on 1 January 2019 under Andhra Pradesh Reorganisation Act, 2014 and has had 7 Chief Justices excluding Acting Chief Justices.

For Acting chief justices

#	Name	Portrait	Date of Appointment	Date of Retirement	Tenure	Parent High Court	Date of initial Appointment
1	Thottathil Bhaskaran Nair Radhakrishnan		1 January 2019 (Note: Transferred from Chhattisgarh High Court as chief justice of undivided Andhra Pradesh High Court and became chief justice of Telangana High Court on its establishment on 1 January 2019)	2 April 2019 (Note: Transferred to Calcutta High Court)	92 days	Kerala	14 October 2004
2	Raghvendra Singh Chauhan		22 June 2019	6 January 2021 (Note: Transferred to Uttarakhand High Court)	1 year, 199 days	Rajasthan	13 June 2005
3	Hima Kohli		7 January 2021	30 August 2021	236 days	Delhi	29 May 2006
4	Satish Chandra Sharma		11 October 2021	27 June 2022 (Note: Transferred to Delhi High Court)	260 days	Madhya Pradesh	18 January 2008
5	Ujjal Bhuyan		28 June 2022	13 July 2023	1 year, 16 days	Gauhati	17 October 2011
6	Alok Aradhe		23 July 2023	20 January 2025 (Note: Transferred to Bombay High Court)	1 year, 182 days	Madhya Pradesh	29 December 2009
7	Aparesh Kumar Singh		19 July 2025 (Note: CJ of Tripura High Court transferred as CJ of Telangana)	5 October 2026	1 year, 79 days	Jharkhand	24 January 2012

== Tripura High Court ==
The Tripura High Court was established on 26 March 2013 under the North-Eastern Areas (Reorganisation) and Other Related Laws (Amendment) Act, 2012 and has had 8 permanent Chief Justices and several Acting Chief Justices.

#	Name	Portrait	Date of Appointment	Date of Retirement	Tenure	Parent High Court	Date of initial Appointment	Notes
1	Deepak Gupta		23 March 2013	15 May 2016	3 years, 54 days	Himachal Pradesh	4 October 2004	(Note: Transferred to Chhattisgarh High Court)
2	Tinilangthang Vaiphei		21 September 2016	28 February 2018	1 year, 161 days	Gauhati	17 July 2003	(Note: Vaiphei was serving as Judge of Gauhati High Court when he was transferred as ACJ and served as such from 16 May 2016 to 20 September 2016 for 128 days before becoming permanent Chief Justice)
3 Expand	Ajay Rastogi		1 March 2018	2 November 2018	247 days	Rajasthan	2 September 2004	
--	Subhasis Talapatra		2 November 2018	13 November 2018	12 days	Tripura	15 November 2011	
4 Expand	Sanjay Karol		14 November 2018	10 November 2019	362 days	Himachal Pradesh	8 March 2007	(Note: Transferred to Patna High Court)
--	Subhasis Talapatra		11 November 2019	15 November 2019	5 days	Tripura	15 November 2011	
5	Akil Abdulhamid Kureshi		16 November 2019	11 October 2021	1 year, 330 days	Gujarat	7 March 2004	(Note: Transferred to Rajasthan High Court)
6 Expand	Indrajit Mahanty		12 October 2021	10 November 2022	1 year, 30 days	Orissa	31 March 2006	(Note: CJ of Rajasthan High Court transferred as CJ of Tripura)
--	T. Amarnath Goud		11 November 2022	14 February 2023	96 days	Telangana	21 September 2017	
7 Expand	Jaswant Singh		15 February 2023	22 February 2023	8 days	Punjab & Haryana	5 December 2007	
--	T. Amarnath Goud		23 February 2023	16 April 2023	53 days	Telangana	21 September 2017	
8 Expand	Aparesh Kumar Singh		17 April 2023	17 July 2025	2 years, 92 days	Jharkhand	24 January 2012	(Note: Transferred to Telangana High Court)
--	T. Amarnath Goud		18 July 2025	21 July 2025	4 days	Telangana	21 September 2017	

== Uttarakhand High Court ==
The Uttarakhand High Court was established on 9 November 2000 under Uttar Pradesh Reorganisation Act, 2000 and has had 15 permanent Chief Justices and several Acting Chief Justices.

#	Name	Portrait	Date of appointment	Date of retirement	Tenure	Parent High Court	Date of initial appointment	Notes
1 Expand	Ashok Desai		6 December 2000	31 March 2003^{[‡]}	2 years, 116 days	Bombay	21 November 1986	(Note: Desai was serving as Judge of Allahabad High Court when he was transferred as ACJ upon creation of Uttarakhand High Court and served as such from 9 November 2000 to 5 December 2000 for 27 days before becoming permanent Chief Justice)
--	Prakash Chandra Verma		1 April 2003	4 August 2003	126 days	Allahabad	5 February 1999	
2 Expand	Sarosh Homi Kapadia		5 August 2003	17 December 2003	135 days	Bombay	8 October 1991	
--	Prakash Chandra Verma		18 December 2003	24 July 2004	220 days	Allahabad	5 February 1999	
3	Vikas Shridhar Sirpurkar		25 July 2004	19 March 2005	238 days	Bombay	9 November 1992	(Note: Transferred to Calcutta High Court)
4 Expand	Cyriac Joseph		20 March 2005	6 January 2006	293 days	Kerala	6 July 1994	(Note: Transferred to Karnataka High Court)
--	Prakash Chandra Verma		7 January 2006	13 January 2006	7 days	Allahabad	5 February 1999	
5	Rajeev Gupta		14 January 2006	1 February 2008	2 years, 19 days	Madhya Pradesh	27 September 1994	(Note: CJ of Kerala High Court transferred as CJ of Uttarakhand and subsequently transferred as CJ to Chhattisgarh High Court)
6 Expand	Vinod Kumar Gupta		2 February 2008	9 September 2009	1 year, 220 days	Jammu & Kashmir	7 November 1990	(Note: CJ of Himachal Pradesh High Court transferred as CJ of Uttarakhand)
--	Bipin Chandra Kandapal		10 September 2009	25 September 2009	16 days	Uttarakhand	29 June 2004	
--	Tarun Agarwala		25 September 2009	28 November 2009	65 days	Allahabad	7 January 2004	(Note: Judge of Allahabad High Court transferred as ACJ)
7	Jagdish Singh Khehar		29 November 2009	7 August 2010	252 days	Punjab & Haryana	8 February 1999	
8 Expand	Barin Ghosh		12 August 2010	4 June 2014	3 years, 297 days	Calcutta	14 July 1995	(Note: CJ of Sikkim High Court transferred as CJ of Uttarakhand)
--	V. K. Bist		5 June 2014	30 July 2014	56 days	Uttarakhand	1 November 2008	
9 Expand	Kuttiyil Mathew Joseph		31 July 2014	6 August 2018	4 years, 7 days	Kerala	14 October 2004	
--	Rajeev Sharma		7 August 2018	2 November 2018	87 days	Himachal Pradesh	3 April 2007	
10 Expand	Ramesh Ranganathan		2 November 2018	27 July 2020	1 year, 269 days	Andhra Pradesh	26 May 2005	
--	Ravi Malimath		28 July 2020	6 January 2021	132 days	Karnataka	18 February 2008	(Note: Transferred as Judge to Himachal Pradesh High Court)
11 Expand	Raghvendra Singh Chauhan		7 January 2021	23 December 2021	351 days	Rajasthan	13 June 2005	(Note: CJ of Telangana High Court transferred as CJ of Uttarakhand)
--	Sanjaya Kumar Mishra		24 December 2021	28 June 2022	187 days	Orissa	7 October 2009	
12 Expand	Vipin Sanghi		28 June 2022	26 October 2023	1 year, 121 days	Delhi	29 May 2006	
--	M. K. Tiwari		27 October 2023	3 February 2024	100 days	Uttarakhand	19 May 2017	
13 Expand	Ritu Bahri		4 February 2024	10 October 2024	250 days	Punjab & Haryana	16 August 2010	
--	M. K. Tiwari		11 October 2024	25 December 2024	76 days	Uttarakhand	19 May 2017	
14	Guhanathan Narendar		26 December 2024	9 January 2026	1 year, 15 days	Karnataka	2 January 2015	
15	Manoj Kumar Gupta		10 January 2026	8 October 2026	272 days	Allahabad	12 April 2013	

== Chief Justices arranged as per date of appointment ==
Name	Portrait	Appointed in HC of	Date of Appointment	Date of Retirement	Tenure	Parent High Court	Date of initial Appointment	Transferred to other HC
Meenakshi Madan Rai		Patna	5 June 2026	11 July 2026	37 days	Sikkim	15 April 2015	
Sujoy Paul		Calcutta	16 January 2026	20 June 2026	156 days	Madhya Pradesh	27 May 2011	
Manoj Kumar Gupta		Uttarakhand	10 January 2026	8 October 2026	272 days	Allahabad	12 April 2013	
S. K. Sahoo		Patna	7 January 2026	4 June 2026	149 days	Orissa	2 July 2014	
Soumen Sen		Meghalaya	8 October 2025	Incumbent	1 year, 46 days	Calcutta	13 April 2011	Yes
P. B. Bajanthri		Patna	21 September 2025	22 October 2025	32 days	Karnataka	2 January 2015	
Shree Chandrashekhar		Bombay	5 September 2025	1 June 2026	270 days	Jharkhand	17 January 2013	
Tarlok Singh Chauhan		Jharkhand	23 July 2025	8 January 2026	170 days	Himachal Pradesh	23 February 2014	
V. M. Pancholi		Patna	21 July 2025	28 August 2025	39 days	Gujarat	1 October 2014	
Sanjeev Sachdeva		Madhya Pradesh	17 July 2025	1 June 2026	320 days	Delhi	17 April 2013	
K. Somashekar		Manipur	22 May 2025	14 September 2025	116 days	Karnataka	14 November 2016	
Arun Palli		Jammu & Kashmir	16 April 2025	1 June 2026	1 year, 47 days	Punjab & Haryana	28 December 2013	
Harish Tandon		Orissa	26 March 2025	15 November 2026	1 year, 235 days	Calcutta	13 April 2010	
G. Narendar		Uttarakhand	26 December 2024	9 January 2026	1 year, 15 days	Karnataka	2 January 2015	
D. Krishnakumar		Manipur	22 November 2024	21 May 2025	181 days	Madras	7 April 2016	
I. P. Mukerji		Meghalaya	3 October 2024	5 September 2025	338 days	Calcutta	18 May 2009	
Manmohan		Delhi	29 September 2024	4 December 2024	67 days	Delhi	13 March 2008	
K. R. Shriram		Madras	27 September 2024	27 September 2025	1 year, 1 day	Bombay	21 June 2013	Yes
Tashi Rabstan		Jammu & Kashmir	27 September 2024	9 April 2025	195 days	Jammu & Kashmir	8 March 2013	
N. M. Jamdar		Kerala	26 September 2024	9 January 2026	1 year, 106 days	Bombay	23 January 2012	
Suresh Kumar Kait		Madhya Pradesh	25 September 2024	23 May 2025	241 days	Delhi	5 September 2008	
Rajiv Shakdher		Himachal Pradesh	25 September 2024	18 October 2024	24 days	Delhi	11 April 2008	
Sheel Nagu		Punjab & Haryana	9 July 2024	1 June 2026	1 year, 328 days	Madhya Pradesh	27 May 2011	
B. R. Sarangi		Jharkhand	5 July 2024	19 July 2024	15 days	Orissa	20 June 2013	
N. V. Anjaria		Karnataka	25 February 2024	29 May 2025	1 year, 94 days	Gujarat	21 November 2011	
S. Vaidyanathan		Meghalaya	11 February 2024	16 August 2024	188 days	Madras	25 October 2013	
C. S. Singh		Orissa	7 February 2024	19 January 2025	348 days	Patna	5 April 2012	
M. M. Shrivastava		Rajasthan	6 February 2024	5 March 2026	2 years, 28 days	Chhattisgarh	10 December 2009	Yes
Vijay Bishnoi		Gauhati	5 February 2024	29 May 2025	1 year, 114 days	Rajasthan	8 January 2013	
Ritu Bahri		Uttarakhand	4 February 2024	10 October 2024	250 days	Punjab & Haryana	16 August 2010	
P. S. Dinesh Kumar		Karnataka	3 February 2024	24 February 2024	22 days	Karnataka	2 January 2015	
Siddharth Mridul		Manipur	20 October 2023	21 November 2024	1 year, 33 days	Delhi	13 March 2008	
Subhasis Talapatra		Orissa	8 August 2023	3 October 2023	57 days	Tripura	15 November 2011	
D. K. Upadhyaya		Bombay	29 July 2023	5 October 2026	3 years, 69 days	Allahabad	21 November 2011	Yes
Dhiraj Singh Thakur		Andhra Pradesh	28 July 2023	24 April 2026	2 years, 271 days	Jammu & Kashmir	8 March 2013	
Sunita Agarwal		Gujarat	23 July 2023	5 October 2026	3 years, 75 days	Allahabad	21 November 2011	
Alok Aradhe		Telangana	23 July 2023	28 August 2025	2 years, 37 days	Madhya Pradesh	29 December 2009	Yes
A. J. Desai		Kerala	22 July 2023	4 July 2024	349 days	Gujarat	21 November 2011	
S. V. N. Bhatti		Kerala	1 June 2023	14 July 2023	44 days	Andhra Pradesh	12 April 2013	
M. S. Ramachandra Rao		Himachal Pradesh	30 May 2023	Incumbent	3 years, 177 days	Telangana	29 June 2012	Yes
A. G. Masih		Rajasthan	30 May 2023	8 November 2023	163 days	Punjab & Haryana	10 July 2008	
R. D. Dhanuka		Bombay	28 May 2023	30 May 2023	3 days	Bombay	23 January 2012	
S. V. Gangapurwala		Madras	28 May 2023	23 May 2024	362 days	Bombay	13 March 2010	
T. S. Sivagnanam		Calcutta	11 May 2023	15 September 2025	2 years, 128 days	Madras	31 March 2009	
Aparesh Kumar Singh		Tripura	17 April 2023	5 October 2026	3 years, 172 days	Jharkhand	24 January 2012	Yes
Ramesh Sinha		Chhattisgarh	29 March 2023	4 September 2026	3 years, 160 days	Allahabad	21 November 2011	
K. Vinod Chandran		Patna	29 March 2023	15 January 2025	1 year, 293 days	Kerala	8 November 2011	
Pritinker Diwaker		Allahabad	26 March 2023	21 November 2023	241 days	Chhattisgarh	31 March 2009	
Sanjaya Kumar Mishra		Jharkhand	20 February 2023	28 December 2023	312 days	Orissa	7 October 2009	
Sonia Giridhar Gokani		Gujarat	16 February 2023	25 February 2023	10 days	Gujarat	17 February 2011	
N. Kotiswar Singh		Jammu & Kashmir	15 February 2023	17 July 2024	1 year, 154 days	Manipur	17 October 2011	
Sandeep Mehta		Gauhati	15 February 2023	8 November 2023	267 days	Rajasthan	30 May 2011	
Jaswant Singh		Tripura	15 February 2023	22 February 2023	8 days	Punjab & Haryana	5 December 2007	
P. B. Varale		Karnataka	15 October 2022	24 January 2024	1 year, 102 days	Bombay	18 July 2008	
A. M. Magrey		Jammu & Kashmir	12 October 2022	7 December 2022	57 days	Jammu & Kashmir	8 March 2013	
Ujjal Bhuyan		Telangana	28 June 2022	13 July 2023	1 year, 16 days	Gauhati	17 October 2011	
Vipin Sanghi		Uttarakhand	28 June 2022	26 October 2023	1 year, 121 days	Delhi	29 May 2006	
R. M. Chhaya		Gauhati	23 June 2022	11 January 2023	203 days	Gujarat	17 February 2011	
A. A. Sayed		Himachal Pradesh	23 June 2022	20 January 2023	212 days	Bombay	11 April 2007	
S. S. Shinde		Rajasthan	21 June 2022	1 August 2022	42 days	Bombay	17 March 2008	
M. N. Bhandari		Madras	14 February 2022	12 September 2022	211 days	Rajasthan	5 July 2007	
R. V. Malimath		Madhya Pradesh	14 October 2021	24 May 2024	2 years, 224 days	Karnataka	18 February 2008	
Prashant Kumar Mishra		Andhra Pradesh	13 October 2021	18 May 2023	1 year, 218 days	Chhattisgarh	10 December 2009	
Aravind Kumar		Gujarat	13 October 2021	12 February 2023	1 year, 123 days	Karnataka	26 June 2009	
R. V. More		Meghalaya	12 October 2021	3 November 2021	23 days	Bombay	8 September 2006	
Ritu Raj Awasthi		Karnataka	11 October 2021	2 July 2022	265 days	Allahabad	13 April 2009	
Prakash Shrivastava		Calcutta	11 October 2021	30 March 2023	1 year, 171 days	Madhya Pradesh	18 January 2008	
Satish Chandra Sharma		Telangana	11 October 2021	8 November 2023	2 years, 29 days	Madhya Pradesh	18 January 2008	Yes
Rajesh Bindal		Allahabad	11 October 2021	12 February 2023	1 year, 125 days	Punjab & Haryana	22 March 2006	
Sanjay Yadav		Allahabad	13 June 2021	25 June 2021	13 days	Madhya Pradesh	2 March 2007	
P. V. Sanjay Kumar		Manipur	14 February 2021	5 February 2023	1 year, 357 days	Telangana	8 August 2008	
Sudhanshu Dhulia		Gauhati	10 January 2021	8 May 2022	1 year, 119 days	Uttarakhand	1 November 2008	
Hima Kohli		Telangana	7 January 2021	30 August 2021	236 days	Delhi	29 May 2006	
Pankaj Mithal		Jammu & Kashmir	4 January 2021	5 February 2023	2 years, 33 days	Allahabad	7 July 2006	Yes
Sanjib Banerjee		Madras	4 January 2021	1 November 2023	2 years, 302 days	Calcutta	22 June 2006	Yes
S. Muralidhar		Orissa	4 January 2021	7 August 2023	2 years, 216 days	Delhi	29 May 2006	
Dipankar Datta		Bombay	28 April 2020	11 December 2022	2 years, 228 days	Calcutta	22 June 2006	
Biswanath Somadder		Meghalaya	27 April 2020	14 December 2025	5 years, 232 days	Calcutta	22 June 2006	Yes
B. P. Dharmadhikari		Bombay	20 March 2020	27 April 2020	39 days	Bombay	15 March 2004	
Ravi Ranjan		Jharkhand	17 November 2019	19 December 2022	3 years, 33 days	Patna	14 July 2008	
Akil Kureshi		Tripura	16 November 2019	6 March 2022	2 years, 111 days	Gujarat	7 March 2004	Yes
Mohammad Rafiq		Meghalaya	13 November 2019	24 May 2022	2 years, 104 days	Rajasthan	15 May 2006	Yes
Arup Kumar Goswami		Sikkim	15 October 2019	10 March 2023	3 years, 147 days	Gauhati	24 January 2011	Yes
S. Manikumar		Kerala	11 October 2019	24 April 2023	3 years, 196 days	Madras	31 July 2006	
Ajai Lamba		Gauhati	7 October 2019	20 September 2020	350 days	Punjab & Haryana	22 March 2006	
J. K. Maheshwari		Andhra Pradesh	7 October 2019	30 August 2021	1 year, 328 days	Madhya Pradesh	25 November 2005	Yes
L. Narayana Swamy		Himachal Pradesh	6 October 2019	30 June 2021	1 year, 268 days	Karnataka	4 July 2007	
Indrajit Mahanty		Rajasthan	6 October 2019	10 November 2022	3 years, 36 days	Orissa	31 March 2006	Yes
R. S. Jha		Punjab & Haryana	6 October 2019	13 October 2023	4 years, 8 days	Madhya Pradesh	18 October 2005	
Vikram Nath		Gujarat	10 September 2019	30 August 2021	1 year, 355 days	Allahabad	24 September 2004	
V. Ramasubramanian		Himachal Pradesh	22 June 2019	22 September 2019	93 days	Madras	31 July 2006	
R. S. Chauhan		Telangana	22 June 2019	23 December 2021	2 years, 185 days	Rajasthan	13 June 2005	Yes
D. N. Patel		Delhi	7 June 2019	12 March 2022	2 years, 279 days	Gujarat	7 March 2004	
Ajay Kumar Mittal		Meghalaya	28 May 2019	29 September 2020	1 year, 125 days	Punjab & Haryana	9 January 2004	Yes
A. S. Oka		Karnataka	10 May 2019	30 August 2021	2 years, 113 days	Bombay	29 August 2003	
P. R. Ramachandra Menon		Chhattisgarh	6 May 2019	31 May 2021	2 years, 26 days	Kerala	5 January 2009	
S. Ravindra Bhat		Rajasthan	5 May 2019	23 September 2019	142 days	Delhi	16 July 2004	
A. P. Sahi		Patna	17 November 2018	31 December 2020	2 years, 45 days	Allahabad	24 September 2004	Yes
Sanjay Karol		Tripura	14 November 2018	5 February 2023	4 years, 84 days	Himachal Pradesh	8 March 2007	Yes
Govind Mathur		Allahabad	14 November 2018	13 April 2021	2 years, 151 days	Rajasthan	2 September 2004	
Sanjay Kumar Seth		Madhya Pradesh	14 November 2018	9 June 2019	208 days	Madhya Pradesh	21 March 2003	
R. Ranganathan		Uttarakhand	2 November 2018	27 July 2020	1 year, 269 days	Andhra Pradesh	26 May 2005	
V. K. Bist		Sikkim	30 October 2018	16 September 2019	322 days	Uttarakhand	1 November 2008	
D. K. Gupta		Calcutta	30 October 2018	31 December 2018	63 days	Calcutta	22 June 2006	
A. S. Bopanna		Gauhati	29 October 2018	23 May 2019	207 days	Karnataka	6 January 2006	
N. H. Patil		Bombay	29 October 2018	6 April 2019	160 days	Bombay	12 October 2001	
Surya Kant		Himachal Pradesh	5 October 2018	23 May 2019	231 days	Punjab & Haryana	9 January 2004	
K. S. Jhaveri		Orissa	12 August 2018	4 January 2020	1 year, 146 days	Gujarat	7 March 2004	
M. R. Shah		Patna	12 August 2018	1 November 2018	82 days	Gujarat	7 March 2004	
V. K. Tahilramani		Madras	12 August 2018	6 September 2019^{[‡]}	1 year, 26 days	Bombay	26 June 2001	
Gita Mittal		Jammu & Kashmir	11 August 2018	8 December 2020	2 years, 120 days	Delhi	16 July 2004	
Aniruddha Bose		Jharkhand	11 August 2018	23 May 2019	286 days	Calcutta	19 January 2004	
Hrishikesh Roy		Kerala	8 August 2018	22 September 2019	1 year, 46 days	Gauhati	12 October 2006	
Ajay Kumar Tripathi		Chhattisgarh	7 July 2018	26 March 2019^{[‡]}	263 days	Patna	9 October 2006	
Krishna Murari		Punjab & Haryana	2 June 2018	22 September 2019	1 year, 113 days	Allahabad	7 January 2004	
M. Y. Mir		Meghalaya	21 May 2018	27 May 2019	1 year, 7 days	Jammu & Kashmir	23 November 2007	
R. Sudhakar		Manipur	18 May 2018	13 February 2021	2 years, 272 days	Madras	10 December 2005	
J. M. Bhattacharya		Calcutta	1 May 2018	24 September 2018	147 days	Calcutta	3 December 2003	
Ajay Rastogi		Tripura	1 March 2018	2 November 2018	247 days	Rajasthan	2 September 2004	
Tarun Agarwala		Meghalaya	12 February 2018	2 March 2018	19 days	Allahabad	7 January 2004	
Antony Dominic		Kerala	9 February 2018	30 May 2018	111 days	Kerala	30 January 2007	
Abhilasha Kumari		Manipur	9 February 2018	23 February 2018	15 days	Himachal Pradesh	2 December 2005	
Indira Banerjee		Madras	5 April 2017	6 August 2018	1 year, 124 days	Calcutta	5 February 2002	
Pradeep Nandrajog		Rajasthan	2 April 2017	23 February 2020	2 years, 328 days	Delhi	20 December 2002	Yes
B. D. Ahmed		Jammu & Kashmir	1 April 2017	15 March 2018	349 days	Delhi	20 December 2002	
P. K. Mohanty		Jharkhand	24 March 2017	9 June 2017	78 days	Orissa	7 March 2002	
Navniti Prasad Singh		Kerala	20 March 2017	6 November 2017	232 days	Patna	6 March 2006	
T. B. Radhakrishnan		Chhattisgarh	18 March 2017	28 April 2021	4 years, 42 days	Kerala	14 October 2004	Yes
Hemant Gupta		Madhya Pradesh	18 March 2017	1 November 2018	1 year, 229 days	Punjab & Haryana	2 July 2002	
Rajendra Menon		Patna	15 March 2017	6 June 2019	2 years, 84 days	Madhya Pradesh	1 April 2002	Yes
Rakesh Ranjan Prasad		Manipur	22 September 2016	30 June 2017	282 days	Jharkhand	27 February 2006	
S. K. Agnihotri		Sikkim	22 September 2016	30 June 2018	1 year, 282 days	Chhattisgarh	5 May 2005	
Mohan Shantanagoudar		Kerala	22 September 2016	16 February 2017	148 days	Karnataka	12 May 2003	
T. Vaiphei		Tripura	21 September 2016	28 February 2018	1 year, 161 days	Gauhati	17 July 2003	
G. C. Gupta		Calcutta	21 September 2016	30 November 2016	71 days	Calcutta	15 September 2000	
S. J. Vazifdar		Punjab & Haryana	7 August 2016	3 May 2018	1 year, 270 days	Bombay	22 January 2001	
D. B. Bhosale		Allahabad	30 July 2016	23 October 2018	2 years, 86 days	Bombay	22 January 2001	
Iqbal Ahmed Ansari		Patna	29 July 2016	28 October 2016	92 days	Gauhati	4 March 2002	
Satish Kumar Mittal		Rajasthan	5 March 2016	14 April 2016	41 days	Punjab & Haryana	2 July 2002	
Ajit Singh		Gauhati	5 March 2016	5 September 2018	2 years, 185 days	Madhya Pradesh	1 April 2002	
Vineet Saran		Orissa	26 February 2016	6 August 2018	2 years, 162 days	Allahabad	14 February 2002	
Dinesh Maheshwari		Meghalaya	24 February 2016	17 January 2019	2 years, 328 days	Rajasthan	2 September 2004	Yes
Subhro Kamal Mukherjee		Karnataka	23 February 2016	9 October 2017	1 year, 229 days	Calcutta	15 September 2000	
R. Subhash Reddy		Gujarat	13 February 2016	1 November 2018	2 years, 262 days	Andhra Pradesh	2 December 2002	
Navin Sinha		Chhattisgarh	9 April 2015	16 February 2017	1 year, 314 days	Patna	11 February 2004	Yes
S. K. Sinha		Sikkim	30 March 2015	6 July 2016	1 year, 99 days	Chhattisgarh	1 December 2004	
Ashok Bhushan		Kerala	26 March 2015	12 May 2016	1 year, 48 days	Allahabad	24 April 2001	
Sunil Ambwani		Rajasthan	24 March 2015	22 August 2015	152 days	Allahabad	24 April 2001	
U. N. Singh		Meghalaya	19 March 2015	14 January 2016	302 days	Madhya Pradesh	22 October 2001	
N. Paul Vasanthakumar		Jammu & Kashmir	2 February 2015	14 March 2017	2 years, 41 days	Madras	10 December 2005	
L. Narasimha Reddy		Patna	2 January 2015	31 July 2015	211 days	Andhra Pradesh	10 September 2001	
Virender Singh		Jharkhand	1 November 2014	6 October 2016	1 year, 341 days	Punjab & Haryana	2 July 2002	
K. M. Joseph		Uttarakhand	31 July 2014	6 August 2018	4 years, 7 days	Kerala	14 October 2004	
L. K. Mohapatra		Manipur	10 July 2014	9 June 2016	1 year, 336 days	Orissa	16 January 1999	
Mansoor Ahmad Mir		Himachal Pradesh	18 June 2014	24 April 2017	2 years, 311 days	Jammu & Kashmir	31 January 2005	
G. Rohini		Delhi	21 April 2014	13 April 2017	2 years, 358 days	Andhra Pradesh	25 June 2001	
Narendra Kumar Jain		Sikkim	7 January 2014	7 October 2014	274 days	Rajasthan	2 September 2004	
R. Banumathi		Jharkhand	16 November 2013	12 August 2014	270 days	Madras	3 April 2003	
D. Y. Chandrachud		Allahabad	31 October 2013	12 May 2016	2 years, 195 days	Bombay	29 March 2000	
R. K. Agrawal		Madras	24 October 2013	16 February 2014	116 days	Allahabad	5 February 1999	
P. C. Pant		Meghalaya	20 September 2013	12 August 2014	327 days	Uttarakhand	29 June 2004	
N. V. Ramana	N. V. Ramana	Delhi	2 September 2013	16 February 2014	168 days	Andhra Pradesh	27 June 2000	
Sanjay Kishan Kaul		Punjab & Haryana	1 June 2013	16 February 2017	3 years, 261 days	Delhi	3 May 2001	Yes
A. M. Khanwilkar		Himachal Pradesh	4 April 2013	12 May 2016	3 years, 39 days	Bombay	29 March 2000	Yes
P. C. Kuriakose		Sikkim	28 March 2013	1 October 2013	188 days	Kerala	9 September 2002	
Deepak Gupta		Tripura	23 March 2013	16 February 2017	3 years, 332 days	Himachal Pradesh	4 October 2004	Yes
A. M. Sapre		Manipur	23 March 2013	12 August 2014	1 year, 143 days	Madhya Pradesh	25 October 1999	Yes
T. Meena Kumari		Meghalaya	23 March 2013	3 August 2013	134 days	Andhra Pradesh	23 February 1998	
D. H. Waghela		Karnataka	7 March 2013	10 August 2016	3 years, 157 days	Gujarat	17 September 1999	Yes
C. Nagappan		Orissa	27 February 2013	18 September 2013	204 days	Madras	27 September 2000	
Shiva Kirti Singh		Allahabad	4 February 2013	18 September 2013	227 days	Patna	29 December 1998	
Amitava Roy		Rajasthan	2 January 2013	26 February 2015	2 years, 56 days	Gauhati	4 February 2002	Yes
Yatindra Singh		Chhattisgarh	22 October 2012	8 October 2014	1 year, 352 days	Allahabad	5 February 1999	
S. A. Bobde	S. A. Bobde	Madhya Pradesh	16 October 2012	11 April 2013	178 days	Bombay	29 March 2000	
D. Murugesan		Delhi	26 September 2012	10 June 2013	258 days	Madras	2 March 2000	
Manjula Chellur		Kerala	26 September 2012	4 December 2017	5 years, 70 days	Karnataka	21 February 2000	Yes
A. K. Sikri		Punjab & Haryana	23 September 2012	11 April 2013	201 days	Delhi	7 July 1999	
Bhaskar Bhattacharya		Gujarat	21 July 2012	28 September 2014	2 years, 70 days	Calcutta	17 July 1997	
Mahesh Mittal Kumar		Jammu & Kashmir	9 June 2012	4 January 2015	2 years, 210 days	Punjab & Haryana	2 July 2001	
Vikramajit Sen		Karnataka	24 December 2011	24 December 2012	1 year, 1 day	Delhi	7 July 1999	
Adarsh Kumar Goel		Gauhati	20 December 2011	6 July 2014	2 years, 199 days	Punjab & Haryana	2 July 2001	Yes
Permod Kohli		Sikkim	12 December 2011	28 February 2013	1 year, 79 days	Jammu & Kashmir	7 January 2003	
F. M. I. Kalifulla		Jammu & Kashmir	18 September 2011	1 April 2012	197 days	Madras	2 March 2000	
P. C. Tatia		Jharkhand	11 September 2011	3 August 2013	1 year, 327 days	Rajasthan	11 January 2001	
Ranjan Gogoi	Ranjan Gogoi	Punjab & Haryana	12 February 2011	22 April 2012	1 year, 71 days	Gauhati	28 February 2001	
Arun Kumar Mishra		Rajasthan	26 November 2010	6 July 2014	3 years, 223 days	Madhya Pradesh	25 October 1999	
Bhagwati Prasad		Jharkhand	22 August 2010	12 May 2011	264 days	Rajasthan	6 April 1996	
F. I. Rebello		Allahabad	26 June 2010	30 July 2011	1 year, 35 days	Bombay	15 April 1996	
J. N. Patel		Calcutta	26 June 2010	4 October 2012	2 years, 101 days	Bombay	11 March 1996	
Madan Lokur		Gauhati	24 June 2010	4 June 2012	1 year, 347 days	Delhi	19 February 1999	Yes
Rekha M. Doshit		Patna	21 June 2010	12 December 2014	4 years, 175 days	Gujarat	18 September 1995	
M. Y. Eqbal		Madras	11 June 2010	23 December 2012	2 years, 196 days	Jharkhand	9 May 1996	
R. S. Garg		Gauhati	17 April 2010	18 June 2010	63 days	Madhya Pradesh	15 December 1994	
V. G. Gowda		Orissa	25 March 2010	23 December 2012	2 years, 274 days	Karnataka	11 June 1997	
Kurian Joseph		Himachal Pradesh	8 February 2010	7 March 2013	3 years, 28 days	Kerala	12 July 2000	
M. S. Shah		Calcutta	24 December 2009	8 September 2015	5 years, 259 days	Gujarat	18 September 1995	Yes
Dipak Misra	Dipak Misra	Patna	23 December 2009	9 October 2011	1 year, 291 days	Orissa	17 January 1996	Yes
S. J. Mukhopadhaya		Gujarat	9 December 2009	12 September 2011	1 year, 278 days	Patna	8 November 1994	
Syed Rafat Alam		Madhya Pradesh	20 December 2009	7 August 2012	2 years, 232 days	Patna	8 November 1994	Yes
Mukul Mudgal		Punjab & Haryana	5 December 2009	3 January 2011	1 year, 30 days	Delhi	2 March 1998	
J. S. Khehar	J. S. Khehar	Uttarakhand	29 November 2009	12 September 2011	1 year, 36 days	Punjab & Haryana	8 February 1999	Yes
Bilal Nazki		Orissa	14 November 2009	17 November 2009	4 days	Jammu & Kashmir	6 January 1995	
Prafulla Kumar Mishra		Patna	12 August 2009	16 September 2009	36 days	Orissa	17 January 1996	
C. K. Prasad		Allahabad	20 March 2009	7 February 2010	325 days	Patna	8 November 1994	
S. R. Bannurmath		Kerala	18 March 2009	22 January 2010	311 days	Karnataka	11 June 1997	
J. B. Koshy		Patna	16 March 2009	12 May 2009	58 days	Kerala	17 January 1996	
A. H. Saikia		Sikkim	7 March 2009	6 April 2011	2 years, 31 days	Gauhati	15 November 2000	Yes
Deepak Verma		Rajasthan	6 March 2009	10 May 2009	69 days	Madhya Pradesh	15 December 1994	
Barin Ghosh		Jammu & Kashmir	3 January 2009	4 June 2014	5 years, 153 days	Calcutta	14 July 1995	Yes
Manmohan Sarin		Jammu & Kashmir	4 September 2008	19 October 2008	46 days	Delhi	17 May 1995	
T. S. Thakur	T. S. Thakur	Punjab & Haryana	11 August 2008	16 November 2009	1 year, 98 days	Jammu & Kashmir	16 February 1994	
P. D. Dinakaran		Karnataka	8 August 2008	29 July 2011^{[‡]}	2 years, 356 days	Madras	19 December 1996	Yes
B. S. Chauhan		Orissa	16 July 2008	10 May 2009	299 days	Allahabad	5 April 1995	
Gyan Sudha Misra		Jharkhand	13 July 2008	30 April 2010	1 year, 292 days	Patna	16 March 1994	
R. M. Lodha	R. M. Lodha	Patna	13 May 2008	16 December 2008	218 days	Rajasthan	31 January 1994	
Jagadish Bhalla		Himachal Pradesh	2 February 2008	31 October 2010	2 years, 272 days	Allahabad	5 April 1995	Yes
A. R. Dave		Andhra Pradesh	7 January 2008	29 April 2010	2 years, 113 days	Gujarat	18 September 1995	Yes
K. S. Radhakrishnan		Jammu & Kashmir	7 January 2008	16 November 2009	1 year, 314 days	Kerala	17 May 1995	Yes
Narayan Roy		Rajasthan	5 January 2008	31 January 2009	1 year, 27 days	Patna	2 December 1991	
Rajesh Balia		Patna	5 January 2008	3 March 2008	59 days	Rajasthan	21 October 1991	
Jagdish Madhurlal Panchal		Rajasthan	16 September 2007	11 November 2007	57 days	Gujarat	22 November 1990	
Jasti Chelameswar		Gauhati	3 May 2007	9 October 2011	4 years, 160 days	Andhra Pradesh	23 June 1997	Yes
Swatanter Kumar		Bombay	31 March 2007	17 December 2009	2 years, 262 days	Delhi	10 November 1994	
S. S. Nijjar		Calcutta	7 March 2007	16 November 2009	2 years, 255 days	Punjab & Haryana	8 April 1996	
H. L. Gokhale		Allahabad	7 March 2007	28 April 2010	3 years, 53 days	Bombay	20 January 1994	Yes
A. K. Ganguly		Orissa	2 March 2007	15 December 2008	1 year, 289 days	Calcutta	10 January 1994	Yes
H. L. Dattu	H. L. Dattu	Chhattisgarh	12 February 2007	15 December 2008	1 year, 308 days	Karnataka	18 December 1995	Yes
Y. R. Meena		Gujarat	3 February 2007	30 June 2008	1 year, 149 days	Rajasthan	20 July 1990	
Bashir Ahmed Khan		Jammu & Kashmir	25 January 2007	31 March 2007	66 days	Jammu & Kashmir	12 November 1990	
Mukundakam Sharma		Delhi	4 December 2006	8 April 2008	1 year, 127 days	Gauhati	10 January 1994	
Vijender Jain		Punjab & Haryana	28 November 2006	1 August 2008	1 year, 248 days	Delhi	24 December 1992	
H. S. Bedi		Bombay	3 October 2006	11 January 2007	101 days	Punjab & Haryana	15 March 1991	
M. Karpaga Vinayagam		Jharkhand	17 September 2006	15 May 2008	1 year, 242 days	Madras	8 January 1996	
Kshitij R. Vyas		Bombay	25 February 2006	18 July 2006	144 days	Gujarat	22 November 1990	
V. K. Bali		Kerala	22 January 2006	23 January 2007	1 year, 2 days	Punjab & Haryana	15 March 1991	

== See also ==
- List of current Indian chief justices
- List of female chief justices in India
- List of sitting judges of the high courts of India
- List of sitting judges of the Supreme Court of India
- List of former judges of the Supreme Court of India
- List of former acting chief justices of the high courts of India
- List of chief justices of the Gujarat High Court
- List of chief justices of the Himachal Pradesh High Court
- List of chief justices of the Uttarakhand High Court
