= List of former acting chief justices of the high courts of India =

This Article is a consolidated list of former acting chief justices of all high courts of India. This list includes all known acting Chief Justices as official websites of all high courts except Jammu & Kashmir High Court and Punjab & Haryana High Court do not maintain list of former acting chief justices, thus compiled data about all the former acting chief justices is not readily available. Therefore, this compiled list is made from various distinct sources giving information about the acting chief justices of the relevant time. Due care has been taken in making this list as exhaustive as possible but information about acting chief justices in pre independence era cannot be found reliably therefore list includes acting chief justices post independence.

Further this list includes only those acting chief justices who had been appointed when there was vacancy in permanent chief justice post. This does not include such acting chief justices who had been appointed to fill in the post when the permanent chief justice went on leave or appointed as acting Governors of respective states.

Colour Key

- Served as Chief Justice of India
- Female Acting Chief Justice
- Elevated to Supreme Court of India
- Female chief justice elevated to Supreme Court of India

Symbol Key

- ^{/} Elevated directly to Supreme Court of India from position of Acting Chief Justice
- ^{‡} Resigned
- ^{†} Died in office
- ^{§} Immediately elevated as CJ of other High Court
- ^{+} Transferred as ACJ from other High Court

Acting chief justices elevated to Supreme Court of India includes those who were elevated to supreme court at any point of their career.

Date of initial appointment - Date of first appointment as High court judge

CJ - Chief Justice

== Allahabad High Court ==
The Allahabad High Court was established on 17 March 1866 under Indian High Courts Act 1861 and the first verifiably known acting chief justice of the high court was Sir Iqbal Ahmed appointed in 1941.

For Permanent chief justices

Name	Image	From (Reason)	To (Reason)	Tenure	Parent High Court	Date of initial Appointment	Ref.
Iqbal Ahmad		20 February 1941 (Death of CJ John Gibb Thom)	20 July 1941 (Became permanent)	151 days	Allahabad	1933	
M. N. Beg		8 August 1966 (Elevation of CJ V. Bhargava to SCI)	23 September 1966 (Became permanent)	47 days	Allahabad	1 June 1951	
Mahesh Narain Shukla		29 November 1983 (Transfer of CJ Satish Chandra to Calcutta)	11 April 1985 (Became permanent)	1 year, 134 days	Allahabad	14 March 1969	
Hridai Narain Seth		6 October 1985 (Retirement of CJ M. N. Shukla)	15 May 1986 (Became permanent)	222 days	Allahabad	7 July 1969	
N. D. Ojha		18 August 1986 (Transfer of CJ H. N. Seth to P&H)	30 September 1986 (Appointment of K. J. Shetty as new CJ)	44 days	Allahabad	3 September 1971	
Dwarka Nath Jha		1 May 1987 (Elevation of CJ K. J. Shetty to SCI)	13 July 1987 (Became permanent)	74 days	Allahabad	6 August 1973	
Amitav Banerji		16 July 1987 (Retirement of CJ D. N. Jha)	25 April 1988 (Became permanent)	285 days	Allahabad	6 August 1973	
K. C. Agarwal		23 May 1989 (Retirement of CJ B. N. Katju)	15 April 1990^{[§]} (Note: Elevated as Chief Justice of Rajasthan High Court) (Appointment of B. P. Jeevan Reddy as new CJ)	328 days	Allahabad	6 August 1973	
Prem Shankar Gupta		7 October 1991 (Elevation of CJ B. P. Jeevan Reddy to SCI)	11 November 1991 (Appointment of M. K. Mukherjee as new CJ)	36 days	Allahabad	17 November 1977	
Satish Chandra Mathur		8 January 1993 (Transfer of CJ M. K. Mukherjee to Bombay)	12 October 1993^{[§]} (Note: Elevated as Chief Justice of Jammu & Kashmir High Court) (Himself elevated as 16th CJ of J&K)	277 days	Allahabad	30 March 1978	
Viney Krishna Khanna		13 October 1993 (Elevation of ACJ S. C. Mathur as 16th CJ of J&K)	23 April 1994^{[§]} (Note: Elevated as Chief Justice of Gauhati High Court) (Appointment of Sarvinder Singh Sodhi as new CJ)	193 days	Allahabad	2 July 1979	
V. N. Khare		15 January 1996 (Retirement of CJ A. Lakshman Rao)	1 February 1996^{[§]} (Note: Elevated as Chief Justice of Calcutta High Court) (Himself elevated as 29th CJ of Calcutta)	18 days	Allahabad	25 June 1983	
Uday Pratap Singh		2 February 1996 (Elevation of ACJ V. N. Khare as 29th CJ of Calcutta)	15 February 1996 (Appointment of Debi Priya Mohapatra as new CJ)	14 days	Patna	15 February 1984	
Brijesh Kumar		9 December 1998 (Elevation of CJ Debi Priya Mohapatra to SCI)	11 February 1999^{[§]} (Appointment of N. K. Mitra as new CJ)	65 days	Allahabad	24 May 1984	
D. S. Sinha		18 April 2000 (Retirement of CJ N. K. Mitra)	7 May 2000 (Transfer of S. K. Sen as ACJ)	20 days	Allahabad	17 March 1986	
S. K. Sen		8 May 2000^{[+]} (Transferred as ACJ)	17 July 2000 (Became permanent)	71 days	Calcutta	17 January 1986	
Govind Prasad Mathur		25 November 2002 (Retirement of CJ S. K. Sen)	19 December 2002^{[/]} (Himself elevated to SCI)	25 days	Allahabad	6 July 1990	
Satya Prakash Srivastava		20 December 2002 (Elevation of ACJ G. P. Mathur to SCI)	30 January 2003 (Appointment of T. Chatterjee as new CJ)	42 days	Allahabad	27 November 1991	
Markandey Katju		27 August 2004 (Elevation of CJ T. Chatterjee to SCI)	27 November 2004^{[§]} (Note: Elevated as Chief Justice of Madras High Court) (Himself elevated as 32nd CJ of Madras)	93 days	Allahabad	30 November 1991	
Vishnu Sahai		28 November 2004 (Elevation of ACJ Markandey Katju as 32nd CJ of Madras)	29 December 2004 (Retirement as ACJ)	32 days	Allahabad	1 February 1994	
S. R. Alam		30 December 2004 (Retirement of ACJ Vishnu Sahai)	10 January 2005 (Appointment of A. N. Ray as new CJ)	12 days	Patna	8 November 1994	
S. R. Alam		27 January 2007 (Transfer of CJ A. N. Ray to Sikkim)	6 March 2007 (Appointment of H. L. Gokhale as new CJ)	39 days	Patna	8 November 1994	
S. R. Alam		9 March 2009 (Transfer of CJ H. L. Gokhale to Madras)	19 March 2009 (Appointment of C. K. Prasad as new CJ)	11 days	Patna	8 November 1994	
Amitava Lala		8 February 2010 (Elevation of CJ C. K. Prasad to SCI)	25 June 2010 (Appointment of F. I. Rebello as new CJ)	138 days	Calcutta	12 May 1997	
Amitava Lala		31 July 2011 (Retirement of CJ F. I. Rebello)	4 August 2011 (Transfer of MP CJ S. R. Alam as new CJ)	5 days	Calcutta	12 May 1997	
Amitava Lala		8 August 2012 (Retirement of CJ S. R. Alam)	19 November 2012 (Retirement as ACJ)	104 days	Calcutta	12 May 1997	
S. K. Singh		20 November 2012 (Retirement of ACJ A. Lala)	3 February 2013 (Became permanent)	76 days	Patna	29 December 1998	
L. K. Mohapatra		19 September 2013 (Elevation of CJ S. K. Singh to SCI)	20 October 2013 (Himself transferred as ACJ of Manipur)	32 days	Orissa	16 January 1999	
Sheo Kumar Singh		21 October 2013 (Transfer of ACJ L. K. Mohapatra as ACJ of Manipur)	30 October 2013 (Appointment of D. Y. Chandrachud as new CJ)	10 days	Allahabad	24 April 2001	
Vimlesh Kumar Shukla		13 May 2016 (Elevation of CJ D. Y. Chandrachud to SCI)	29 July 2016 (Appointment of D. B. Bhosale as new CJ)	78 days	Allahabad	21 December 2002	
Govind Mathur		24 October 2018 (Retirement of CJ D. B. Bhosale)	13 November 2018 (Became permanent)	21 days	Rajasthan	2 September 2004	
Sanjay Yadav		14 April 2021 (Retirement of CJ Govind Mathur)	12 June 2021 (Became permanent)	60 days	Madhya Pradesh	2 March 2007	
M. N. Bhandari		26 June 2021 (Retirement of CJ Sanjay Yadav)	10 October 2021 (Appointment of Rajesh Bindal as new CJ)	107 days	Rajasthan	5 July 2007	
Pritinker Diwaker		13 February 2023 (Elevation of CJ Rajesh Bindal to SCI)	25 March 2023 (Became permanent)	41 days	Chhattisgarh	31 March 2009	
M. K. Gupta		22 November 2023 (Retirement of CJ Pritinker Diwaker)	4 February 2024 (Appointment of Arun Bhansali as new CJ)	75 days	Allahabad	12 April 2013	

== Andhra Pradesh High Court ==
The Andhra Pradesh High Court was established on 1 January 2019 under the Andhra Pradesh Reorganisation Act, 2014 with C. Praveen Kumar as its inaugural acting chief justice.

For Permanent chief justices

Name	Image	From (Reason)	To (Reason)	Tenure	Parent High Court	Date of initial Appointment
C. Praveen Kumar		1 January 2019 (Creation of New HC)	6 October 2019 (Appointment of J. K. Maheshwari as new CJ)	280 days	Andhra Pradesh	29 June 2012
Akula Venkata Sesha Sai		19 May 2023 (Elevation of CJ P. K. Mishra to SCI)	27 July 2023 (Appointment of D. S. Thakur as new CJ)	70 days	Andhra Pradesh	12 April 2013

== Bombay High Court ==
The Bombay High Court was established on 14 August 1862 under the Indian High Courts Act 1861 and the first verifiably known acting chief justice of the high court was M. C. Chagla appointed in 1947. Website of Maharashtra Judicial Academy contains list of its former patron in chiefs who always had been the chief justice of Bombay High Court (whether acting or permanent). Thus the list contained in this website would serve as primary reference for acting chief justices after 2009.

For Permanent chief justices

Name	Image	From (Reason)	To (Reason)	Tenure	Parent High Court	Date of initial Appointment	Ref.
M. C. Chagla		3 January 1948 (Resignation of CJ Leonard Stone)	5 February 1948 (Became permanent)	34 days	Bombay	5 August 1941	
Y. S. Tambe		28 November 1965 (Death of CJ H. K. Chainani)	6 February 1966 (Became permanent)	71 days	Nagpur	8 February 1954	
V. S. Deshpande		19 November 1980 (Retirement of CJ Balkrishna Narhar Deshmukh)	11 January 1981 (Became permanent)	54 days	Bombay	11 June 1967	
D. P. Madon		11 August 1982 (Retirement of CJ V. S. Deshpande)	30 August 1982 (Became permanent)	20 days	Bombay	25 September 1967	
M. N. Chandurkar		15 March 1983 (Elevation of CJ D. P. Madon to SCI)	1 January 1984 (Became permanent)	293 days	Bombay	28 October 1967	
M. H. Kania		2 April 1984 (Transfer of CJ M. N. Chandurkar to Madras)	7 April 1984 (Transfer of Undivided AP CJ K. M. Reddy as new CJ)	6 days	Bombay	4 November 1969	
M. H. Kania		22 October 1985 (Retirement of CJ K. M. Reddy)	22 June 1986 (Became permanent)	241 days	Bombay	4 November 1969	
Sharadchandra Krishnaprasd Desai		1 May 1987 (Elevation of CJ M. H. Kania to SCI)	2 September 1987 (Himself appointed as Acting Governor of Maharashtra)	125 days	Bombay	15 April 1970	
C. S. Dharmadhikari		3 September 1987 (Appointment of ACJ S. K. Desai as Acting Governor of Maharashtra)	1 November 1987 (Transfer of Calcutta CJ C. Mookerjee as new CJ)	60 days	Bombay	13 July 1972	
Subhash Chhaganlal Pratap		1 January 1991 (Retirement of CJ C. Mookerjee)	6 January 1991 (Transfer of Calcutta CJ P. D. Desai as new CJ)	6 days	Bombay	19 September 1977	
Sujata Manohar		15 December 1992 (Retirement of CJ P. D. Desai)	8 January 1993 (Transfer of Allahabad CJ M. K. Mukherjee as new CJ)	25 days	Bombay	23 January 1978	
Sujata Manohar		15 December 1993 (Elevation of CJ M. K. Mukherjee to SCI)	14 January 1994 (Became permanent)	31 days	Bombay	23 January 1978	
Madhav Laxman Pendse		1 April 1995 (Resignation of CJ A. M. Bhattacharjee)	27 July 1995^{[§]} (Note: Elevated as Chief Justice of Karnataka High Court) (Himself elevated as 16th CJ of Karnataka)	118 days	Bombay	25 January 1978	
A. C. Agarwal		9 December 1998 (Elevation of CJ M. B. Shah to SCI)	2 February 1999 (Appointment of Y. K. Sabharwal as new CJ)	56 days	Bombay	21 November 1986	
Manohar Bansiji Ghodeswar		29 January 2000 (Elevation of CJ Y. K. Sabharwal to SCI)	13 February 2000 (Retirement as ACJ)	16 days	Bombay	15 November 1988	
Bhagwati Prasad Saraf		14 February 2000 (Retirement of ACJ M. B. Ghodeswar)	20 February 2000^{[§]} (Note: Elevated as Chief Justice of Jammu & Kashmir High Court) (Himself elevated as 20th CJ of J&K)	7 days	Gauhati	2 January 1989	
Niranjan Janmashanker Pandya		21 February 2000 (Elevation of ACJ B. P. Saraf as 20th CJ of J&K)	30 March 2000 (Appointment of B. P. Singh as new CJ)	39 days	Gujarat	21 June 1990	
Gulabrao Deorao Patil		14 December 2001 (Elevation of CJ B. P. Singh to SCI)	30 December 2001 (Transfer of HP CJ C. K. Thakker as new CJ)	17 days	Bombay	30 July 1990	
A. P. Shah		7 June 2004 (Elevation of CJ C. K. Thakker to SCI)	24 July 2004 (Appointment of Dalveer Bhandari as new CJ)	48 days	Bombay	18 December 1992	
Vishwanath Gopal Palshikar		28 October 2005 (Elevation of CJ Dalveer Bhandari to SCI)	24 February 2006 (Appointment of K. R. Vyas as new CJ)	120 days	Bombay	20 January 1994	
Vishwanath Gopal Palshikar		19 July 2006 (Retirement of CJ K. R. Vyas)	2 October 2006 (Appointment of H. S. Bedi as new CJ)	76 days	Bombay	20 January 1994	
H. L. Gokhale		12 January 2007 (Elevation of CJ H. S. Bedi to SCI)	6 March 2007^{[§]} (Note: Elevated as Chief Justice of Allahabad High Court) (Himself elevated as 40th CJ of Allahabad)	54 days	Bombay	20 January 1994	
J. N. Patel		7 March 2007 (Elevation of ACJ H. L. Gokhale as 40th CJ of Allahabad)	30 March 2007 (Appointment of Swatanter Kumar as new CJ)	24 days	Bombay	11 March 1996	
J. N. Patel		18 December 2009 (Elevation of CJ Swatanter Kumar to SCI)	10 February 2010 (Transfer of Undivided AP CJ A. R. Dave as new CJ)	55 days	Bombay	11 March 1996	
J. N. Patel		30 April 2010 (Elevation of CJ A. R. Dave to SCI)	25 June 2010^{[§]} (Note: Elevated as Chief Justice of Calcutta High Court) (Transfer of Calcutta CJ M. S. Shah as new CJ)	57 days	Bombay	11 March 1996	
V. K. Tahilramani		9 September 2015 (Retirement of CJ M. S. Shah)	14 February 2016 (Transfer of Orissa CJ D. H. Waghela as new CJ)	159 days	Bombay	26 June 2001	
V. K. Tahilramani		11 August 2016 (Retirement of CJ D. H. Waghela)	21 August 2016 (Transfer of Calcutta CJ Manjula Chellur as new CJ)	11 days	Bombay	26 June 2001	
V. K. Tahilramani		5 December 2017 (Retirement of CJ Manjula Chellur)	11 August 2018^{[§]} (Note: Elevated as Chief Justice of Madras High Court) (Herself elevated as 40th CJ of Madras)	250 days	Bombay	26 June 2001	
N. H. Patil		12 August 2018 (Elevation of ACJ V. K. Tahilramani as 40th CJ of Madras)	28 October 2018 (Became permanent)	78 days	Bombay	12 October 2001	
B. P. Dharmadhikari		24 February 2020 (Retirement of CJ Pradeep Nandrajog)	19 March 2020 (Became permanent)	25 days	Bombay	15 March 2004	
S. V. Gangapurwala		12 December 2022 (Elevation of CJ Dipankar Datta to SCI)	27 May 2023^{[§]} (Appointment of R. D. Dhanuka as new CJ)	167 days	Bombay	13 March 2010	
N. M. Jamdar		31 May 2023 (Retirement of CJ R. D. Dhanuka)	28 July 2023 (Appointment of D. K. Upadhyaya as new CJ)	59 days	Bombay	23 January 2012	
Shree Chandrashekhar		29 August 2025 (Elevation of CJ Alok Aradhe to SCI)	4 September 2025 (Became permanent)	7 days	Jharkhand	17 January 2013	
R. V. Ghuge		2 June 2026 (Elevation of CJ Shree Chandrashekhar to SCI)	8 September 2026^{[§]} (Appointment of M. C. Tripathi as new CJ)	99 days	Bombay	21 June 2013	

== Calcutta High Court ==
The Calcutta High Court was established on 1 July 1862 under the Indian High Courts Act 1861 and the first verifiably known acting chief justice of the high court was P. B. Mukharji appointed in 1970.

For Permanent chief justices

Name	Image	From (Reason)	To (Reason)	Tenure	Parent High Court	Date of initial Appointment	Ref.
P. B. Mukharji		14 January 1970 (Retirement of CJ D. N. Sinha)	19 May 1970 (Became permanent)	126 days	Calcutta	3 January 1949	
S. Mukharji		1 March 1983 (Retirement of CJ S. C. Deb)	14 March 1983^{[/]} (Himself elevated to SCI)	14 days	Calcutta	31 July 1968	
Tarun Kumar Basu		15 March 1983 (Elevation of ACJ S. Mukharji to SCI)	28 November 1983 (Transfer of Allahabad CJ Satish Chandra as new CJ)	259 days	Calcutta	31 July 1968	
Rabindranath Pyne		3 May 1988 (Resignation of CJ D. S. Tewatia)	19 May 1988^{[§]} (Note: Elevated as Chief Justice of Delhi High Court) (Himself elevated as 14th CJ of Delhi)	17 days	Calcutta	6 March 1974	
Manashnath Roy		20 May 1988 (Elevation of ACJ R. N. Pyne as 14th CJ of Delhi)	13 November 1988 (Transfer of HP CJ P. D. Desai as new CJ)	178 days	Calcutta	10 June 1974	
A. M. Bhattacharjee		15 June 1992 (Elevation of CJ N. P. Singh to SCI)	24 January 1993 (Became permanent)	224 days	Sikkim	16 June 1976	
Samir Kumar Mookherjee		21 March 1997 (Elevation of CJ V. N. Khare to SCI)	27 October 1997 (Transfer of Undivided AP CJ P. S. Mishra as new CJ)	221 days	Calcutta	9 January 1984	
Samir Kumar Mookherjee		15 July 1998 (Resignation of CJ P. S. Mishra)	29 April 1999 (Retirement as ACJ)	289 days	Calcutta	9 January 1984	
S. K. Sen		29 April 1999 (Retirement of ACJ S. K. Mookherjee)	17 May 1999 (Himself appointed as Acting Governor of West Bengal)	19 days	Calcutta	17 January 1986	
S. K. Sen		5 December 1999 (Reverted from position of Acting Governor to ACJ)	21 December 1999 (Transfer of MP CJ A. K. Mathur as new CJ)	17 days	Calcutta	17 January 1986	
S. B. Sinha		18 May 1999 (Appointment of ACJ S. K. Sen as Acting Governor of West Bengal)	4 December 1999 (Acting Governor S. K. Sen reverted to his position as ACJ)	201 days	Patna	9 March 1987	
A. N. Ray		7 June 2004 (Elevation of CJ A. K. Mathur to SCI)	10 January 2005^{[§]} (Note: Elevated as Chief Justice of Allahabad High Court) (Himself elevated as 38th CJ of Allahabad)	218 days	Calcutta	6 August 1990	
A. Kabir	Altamas Kabir	11 January 2005 (Elevation of ACJ A. N. Ray as 38th CJ of Allahabad)	28 February 2005^{[§]} (Note: Elevated as Chief Justice of Jharkhand High Court) (Himself elevated as 3rd CJ of Jharkhand)	49 days	Calcutta	6 August 1990	
A. K. Ganguly		1 March 2005 (Elevation of ACJ A. Kabir as 3rd CJ of Jharkhand)	19 March 2005 (Transfer of Uttarakhand CJ V. S. Sirpurkar as new CJ)	19 days	Calcutta	10 January 1994	
B. Bhattacharya		12 January 2007 (Elevation of CJ V. S. Sirpurkar to SCI)	6 March 2007 (Appointment of S. S. Nijjar as new CJ)	54 days	Calcutta	17 July 1997	
B. Bhattacharya		17 November 2009 (Elevation of CJ S. S. Nijjar to SCI)	23 December 2009 (Appointment of M. S. Shah as new CJ)	37 days	Calcutta	17 July 1997	
K. J. Sengupta		5 October 2012 (Retirement of CJ J. N. Patel)	30 October 2012 (Himself transferred as Judge to Uttarakhand)	26 days	Calcutta	17 July 1997	
Pratap Kumar Ray		31 October 2012 (Transfer of ACJ K. J. Sengupta as Judge to Uttarakhand)	14 December 2012 (Transfer of Rajasthan CJ A. K. Mishra as new CJ)	45 days	Calcutta	15 September 2000	
Ashim Kumar Banerjee		7 July 2014 (Elevation of CJ Arun Mishra to SCI)	5 August 2014 (Transfer of Kerala CJ Manjula Chellur as new CJ)	30 days	Calcutta	15 September 2000	
G. C. Gupta		22 August 2016 (Transfer of CJ Manjula Chellur to Bombay)	20 September 2016 (Became permanent)	30 days	Calcutta	15 September 2000	
N. N. Mhatre		1 December 2016 (Retirement of CJ G. C. Gupta)	19 September 2017 (Retirement as ACJ)	293 days	Bombay	28 March 2001	
Rakesh Tiwari		20 September 2017 (Retirement of ACJ N. N. Mhatre)	24 October 2017 (Retirement as ACJ)	35 days	Allahabad	14 February 2002	
J. M. Bhattacharya		25 October 2017 (Retirement of ACJ Rakesh Tiwari)	30 April 2018 (Became permanent)	188 days	Calcutta	3 December 2003	
D. K. Gupta		25 September 2018 (Retirement of CJ J. M. Bhattacharya)	29 October 2018 (Became permanent)	35 days	Calcutta	22 June 2006	
Biswanath Somadder		1 January 2019 (Retirement of CJ D. K. Gupta)	3 April 2019 (Transfer of Telangana CJ T. B. Radhakrishnan as new CJ)	93 days	Calcutta	22 June 2006	
Rajesh Bindal		28 April 2021 (Retirement of CJ T. B. Radhakrishnan)	10 October 2021^{[§]} (Appointment of Prakash Shrivastava as new CJ)	166 days	Punjab & Haryana	22 March 2006	
T. S. Sivagnanam		31 March 2023 (Retirement of CJ Prakash Shrivastava)	10 May 2023 (Became permanent)	41 days	Madras	31 March 2009	
Soumen Sen		16 September 2025 (Retirement of CJ T. S. Sivagnanam)	7 October 2025^{[§]} (Note: Elevated as Chief Justice of Meghalaya High Court) (Himself elevated as 14th CJ of Meghalaya)	22 days	Calcutta	13 April 2011	
Sujoy Paul		8 October 2025 (Elevation of ACJ Soumen Sen as 14th CJ of Meghalaya)	15 January 2026 (Became permanent)	100 days	Madhya Pradesh	27 May 2011	
T. Chakraborty		21 June 2026 (Retirement of CJ Sujoy Paul)	8 September 2026 (Appointment of R. V. Ghuge as new CJ)	80 days	Calcutta	30 October 2013	

== Chhattisgarh High Court ==
The Chhattisgarh High Court was established on 1 November 2000 under the Madhya Pradesh Reorganisation Act, 2000 with R. S. Garg as its inaugural acting chief justice.

For Permanent chief justices

Name	Image	From (Reason)	To (Reason)	Tenure	Parent High Court	Date of initial Appointment
R. S. Garg		1 November 2000 (Creation of New HC)	4 December 2000 (Appointment of W. A. Shishak as new CJ)	34 days	Madhya Pradesh	15 December 1994
Fakhruddin		16 January 2002 (Transfer of CJ W. A. Shishak to HP)	5 February 2002 (Appointment of K. H. N. Kuranga as new CJ)	21 days	Madhya Pradesh	15 December 1994
Fakhruddin		11 May 2004 (Retirement of CJ K. H. N. Kuranga)	27 May 2004 (Appointment of A. S. V. Moorthy as new CJ)	17 days	Madhya Pradesh	15 December 1994
Fakhruddin		8 January 2005 (Retirement of CJ A. S. V. Moorthy)	13 March 2005 (Appointment of A. K. Patnaik as new CJ)	65 days	Madhya Pradesh	15 December 1994
Fakhruddin		2 October 2005 (Transfer of CJ A. K. Patnaik to MP)	16 November 2005 (Appointment of S. R. Nayak as new CJ)	46 days	Madhya Pradesh	15 December 1994
L. C. Bhadoo		1 January 2007 (Retirement of CJ S. R. Nayak)	11 February 2007 (Appointment of H. L. Dattu as new CJ)	42 days	Chhattisgarh	20 January 2003
Jagadish Bhalla		19 May 2007^{[+]} (Note: Judge of Allahabad High Court transferred as ACJ) (Transfer of CJ H. L. Dattu to Kerala)	1 February 2008^{[§]} (Note: Elevated as Chief Justice of Himachal Pradesh High Court) (Transfer of Uttarakhand CJ Rajeev Gupta as new CJ)	259 days	Allahabad	5 April 1995
A. M. Sapre		10 October 2012 (Retirement of CJ Rajeev Gupta)	21 October 2012 (Appointment of Yatindra Singh as new CJ)	12 days	Madhya Pradesh	25 October 1999
Navin Sinha		9 October 2014 (Retirement of CJ Yatindra Singh)	8 April 2015 (Became permanent)	159 days	Patna	11 February 2004
Pritinker Diwaker		17 February 2017 (Elevation of CJ Deepak Gupta to SCI)	17 March 2017 (Appointment of T. B. Radhakrishnan as new CJ)	29 days	Chhattisgarh	31 March 2009
P. K. Mishra		27 March 2019 (Resignation of CJ A. K. Tripathi)	5 May 2019 (Appointment of P. R. Ramachandra Menon as new CJ)	40 days	Chhattisgarh	10 December 2009
P. K. Mishra		1 June 2021 (Retirement of CJ P. R. Ramachandra Menon)	11 October 2021^{[§]} (Note: Elevated as Chief Justice of Andhra Pradesh High Court) (Transfer of AP CJ A. K. Goswami as new CJ)	133 days	Chhattisgarh	10 December 2009
Goutam Bhaduri		11 March 2023 (Retirement of CJ A. K. Goswami)	28 March 2023 (Appointment of Ramesh Sinha as new CJ)	18 days	Chhattisgarh	16 September 2013
S. K. Agrawal		5 September 2026 (Retirement of CJ Ramesh Sinha)	6 September 2026^{[§]} (Note: Elevated as Chief Justice of Rajasthan High Court) (Appointment of K. R. Mohapatra as new CJ)	2 days	Chhattisgarh	16 September 2013

== Delhi High Court ==
The Delhi High Court was established on 31 October 1966 under Delhi High Court Act, 1966 and the first acting chief justice of the high court was Prakash Narain appointed in 1980. Website of Delhi State legal services Authority contains list of its former patron in chiefs who always had been the chief justice of Delhi High Court (whether acting or permanent). Thus the list contained in this website would serve as primary reference for acting chief justices after 1990 until 2010 because after 2010 this website only mentions permanent chief justices as Patron-in-Chief.

For Permanent chief justices

Name	Image	From (Reason)	To (Reason)	Tenure	Parent High Court	Date of initial Appointment	Ref.
Prakash Narain		27 June 1980 (Retirement of CJ Vasant Shamrao Deshpande)	7 January 1981 (Became permanent)	195 days	Delhi	20 January 1969	
Tejinder Pal Singh Chawla		20 August 1986 (Retirement of CJ Dalip Kumar Kapur)	25 September 1986 (Became permanent)	37 days	Delhi	6 January 1972	
Surjit Singh Chadha		19 March 1988 (Transfer of CJ Yogeshwar Dayal to Undivided AP)	19 May 1988 (Appointment of Rabindranath Pyne as new CJ)	62 days	Delhi	18 December 1974	
Leila Seth		28 September 1990 (Retirement of CJ Rabindranath Pyne)	27 November 1990 (Appointment of M. C. Jain as new CJ)	61 days	Delhi	25 July 1978	
Leila Seth		22 July 1991 (Retirement of CJ M. C. Jain)	4 August 1991^{[§]} (Note: Elevated as Chief Justice of Himachal Pradesh High Court) (Appointment of Gokal Chand Mittal as new CJ)	14 days	Delhi	25 July 1978	
Mahinder Narain		21 March 1997 (Elevation of CJ M. J. Rao to SCI)	25 June 1997 (Appointment of Ajay Prakash Misra as new CJ)	97 days	Delhi	4 July 1985	
Mahinder Narain		4 December 1997 (Elevation of CJ Ajay Prakash Misra to SCI)	18 September 1998 (Himself went on leave)	289 days	Delhi	4 July 1985	
Mahinder Narain		10 December 1998 (Resumed duty after leave)	17 January 1999 (Again went on leave and subsequently died)	39 days	Delhi	4 July 1985	
Y. K. Sabharwal	Y. K. Sabharwal	19 September 1998 (ACJ Mahinder Narain went on leave)	9 December 1998 (ACJ Mahinder Narain Resumed duty after leave)	82 days	Delhi	17 November 1986	
Y. K. Sabharwal	Y. K. Sabharwal	18 January 1999 (ACJ Mahinder Narain went on leave and subsequently died)	2 February 1999^{[§]} (Note: Elevated as Chief Justice of Bombay High Court) (Himself elevated as 31st CJ of Bombay)	16 days	Delhi	17 November 1986	
Devinder Gupta		3 February 1999 (Elevation of ACJ Y. K. Sabharwal as 31st CJ of Bombay)	24 May 1999 (Appointment of S. N. Variava as new CJ)	111 days	Himachal Pradesh	25 June 1990	
Devinder Gupta		15 March 2000 (Elevation of CJ S. N. Variava to SCI)	9 May 2000 (Transfer of Kerala CJ A. Pasayat as new CJ)	56 days	Himachal Pradesh	25 June 1990	
Devinder Gupta		19 October 2001 (Elevation of CJ A. Pasayat to SCI)	25 November 2001 (Transfer of Undivided AP CJ S. B. Sinha as new CJ)	38 days	Himachal Pradesh	25 June 1990	
Devinder Gupta		2 October 2002 (Elevation of CJ S. B. Sinha to SCI)	4 March 2003^{[§]} (Note: Elevated as Chief Justice of undivided Andhra Pradesh High Court) (Transfer of J&K CJ B. C. Patel as new CJ)	154 days	Himachal Pradesh	25 June 1990	
Bashir Ahmed Khan		8 August 2005 (Retirement of CJ B. C. Patel)	11 October 2005 (Note: Transferred to Jammu & Kashmir High Court as ACJ) (Transfer of Madras CJ Markandey Katju as new CJ)	65 days	Jammu & Kashmir	12 November 1990	
Vijender Jain		10 April 2006 (Elevation of CJ Markandey Katju to SCI)	27 November 2006^{[§]} (Note: Elevated as Chief Justice of Punjab & Haryana High Court) (Himself elevated as 27th CJ of P&H)	232 days	Delhi	24 December 1992	
M. K. Sharma		28 November 2006 (Elevation of ACJ Vijender Jain as 27th CJ of P&H)	3 December 2006 (Became permanent)	6 days	Gauhati	10 January 1994	
T. S. Thakur		9 April 2008 (Elevation of CJ M. K. Sharma to SCI)	10 May 2008 (Transfer of Madras CJ A. P. Shah as new CJ)	32 days	Jammu & Kashmir	16 February 1994	
M. B. Lokur		13 February 2010 (Retirement of CJ A. P. Shah)	23 May 2010 (Transfer of Patna CJ Dipak Misra as new CJ)	100 days	Delhi	19 February 1999	
A. K. Sikri		10 October 2011 (Elevation of CJ Dipak Misra to SCI)	22 September 2012^{[§]} (Himself elevated as 31st CJ of P&H)	349 days	Delhi	7 July 1999	
S. K. Kaul		23 September 2012 (Elevation of ACJ A. K. Sikri as 31st CJ of P&H)	25 September 2012 (Appointment of D. Murugesan as new CJ)	3 days	Delhi	3 May 2001	
B. D. Ahmed		11 June 2013 (Retirement of CJ D. Murugesan)	1 September 2013 (Appointment of N. V. Ramana as new CJ)	83 days	Delhi	20 December 2002	
B. D. Ahmed		17 February 2014 (Elevation of CJ N. V. Ramana to SCI)	20 April 2014 (Appointment of G. Rohini as new CJ)	63 days	Delhi	20 December 2002	
Gita Mittal		14 April 2017 (Retirement of CJ G. Rohini)	8 August 2018^{[§]} (Note: Elevated as Chief Justice of Jammu & Kashmir High Court) (Transfer of Patna CJ Rajendra Menon as new CJ)	1 year, 117 days	Delhi	16 July 2004	
Vipin Sanghi		13 March 2022 (Retirement of CJ D. N. Patel)	27 June 2022^{[§]} (Note: Elevated as Chief Justice of Uttarakhand High Court) (Transfer of Telangana CJ S. C. Sharma as new CJ)	107 days	Delhi	29 May 2006	
Manmohan		9 November 2023 (Elevation of CJ S. C. Sharma to SCI)	28 September 2024 (Became permanent)	325 days	Delhi	13 March 2008	
Vibhu Bakhru		5 December 2024 (Elevation of CJ Manmohan to SCI)	20 January 2025 (Transfer of Bombay CJ D. K. Upadhyaya as new CJ)	47 days	Delhi	17 April 2013	

== Gauhati High Court ==
The Gauhati High Court was established on 1 March 1948 under the Government of India Act 1935 and the first acting chief justice of the high court was T. V. Thadani appointed in 1949.

For Permanent chief justices

Name	Image	From (Reason)	To (Reason)	Tenure	Parent High Court	Date of initial Appointment	Ref.
T. V. Thadani		8 April 1949 (Resignation of CJ R. F. Lodge)	27 May 1951 (Became permanent)	2 years, 50 days	Gauhati	1948	
Ram Labhaya		22 November 1952 (Retirement of CJ T. V. Thadani)	9 February 1953 (Appointment of Sarjoo Prasad as new CJ)	80 days	Gauhati	3 January 1949	
Mahendra Chandra Pathak		10 September 1973 (Elevation of CJ P. K. Goswami to SCI)	8 January 1974 (Became permanent)	121 days	Gauhati	23 August 1967	
Mahadevayya Sadanand Swami		1 July 1977 (Retirement of CJ M. C. Pathak)	30 September 1977 (Became permanent)	92 days	Karnataka	2 June 1967	
Baharul Islam		11 March 1979 (Transfer of CJ C. M. Lodha to Rajasthan)	6 July 1979 (Became permanent)	118 days	Gauhati	20 January 1972	
D. Pathak		2 March 1980 (Retirement of CJ Baharul Islam)	17 April 1983 (Became permanent)	3 years, 47 days	Gauhati	8 August 1973	
Kiranmoy Lahiri		15 November 1984 (Retirement of CJ T. S. Misra)	29 September 1985 (Transfer of Undivided AP CJ P. Chennakesava Reddy as new CJ)	319 days	Gauhati	19 November 1975	
Khagendra Nath Saikia		20 December 1986 (Retirement of CJ K. M. Lahiri)	13 June 1987 (Became permanent)	176 days	Gauhati	12 February 1979	
B. L. Hansaria		16 March 1988 (Retirement of CJ G. M. Lodha)	5 May 1988 (Appointment of A. Raghuvir as new CJ)	51 days	Gauhati	12 February 1979	
Shafiqul Haque		22 March 1991 (Retirement of CJ A. Raghuvir)	19 August 1991 (Appointment of U. L. Bhat as new CJ)	151 days	Gauhati	10 January 1984	
Rajkumar Manisana Singh		12 December 1993 (Transfer of CJ U. L. Bhat to Madhya Pradesh)	26 January 1994 (Became permanent)	46 days	Gauhati	21 November 1984	
S. N. Phukan		2 February 1994 (Retirement of CJ R. K. Manisana Singh)	23 April 1994 (Appointment of Viney Krishna Khanna as new CJ)	81 days	Gauhati	11 October 1985	
Virendra Dutt Gyani		15 February 1997 (Retirement of CJ Viney Krishna Khanna)	17 June 1997 (Transfer of J&K CJ M. Ramakrishna as new CJ)	122 days	Madhya Pradesh	14 May 1984	
Virendra Dutt Gyani		13 April 1998 (Retirement of CJ M. Ramakrishna)	29 July 1998 (Retirement as ACJ)	108 days	Madhya Pradesh	14 May 1984	
Naresh Chandra Jain		30 July 1998 (Retirement of ACJ V. D. Gyani)	11 February 1999 (Appointment of Brijesh Kumar as new CJ)	197 days	Punjab & Haryana	27 June 1988	
H. K. Sema		5 April 2001 (Retirement of CJ N. C. Jain)	6 June 2001 (Himself transferred as Judge to J&K)	63 days	Gauhati	24 May 1989	
R. S. Mongia		12 June 2001 (Transfer of ACJ H. K. Sema as Judge to J&K)	20 September 2001 (Became permanent)	101 days	Punjab & Haryana	15 June 1990	
Dinendra Biswas		27 August 2004 (Elevation of CJ P. P. Naolekar to SCI)	20 May 2005 (Transfer of P&H CJ B. K. Roy as new CJ)	267 days	Gauhati	31 October 1997	
Dinendra Biswas		30 September 2005 (Transfer of CJ B. K. Roy to Sikkim)	4 December 2005 (Appointment of B. S. Reddy as new CJ)	66 days	Gauhati	31 October 1997	
Dinendra Biswas		12 January 2007 (Elevation of CJ B. S. Reddy to SCI)	2 May 2007 (Appointment of J. Chelameswar as new CJ)	111 days	Gauhati	31 October 1997	
Ranjan Gogoi	Ranjan Gogoi	17 March 2010 (Transfer of CJ J. Chelameswar to Kerala)	16 April 2010 (Appointment of R. S. Garg as new CJ)	31 days	Gauhati	28 February 2001	
Ranjan Gogoi	Ranjan Gogoi	18 June 2010 (Retirement of CJ R. S. Garg)	23 June 2010 (Appointment of Madan Lokur as new CJ)	6 days	Gauhati	28 February 2001	
A. K. Goel		15 November 2011 (Transfer of CJ M. B. Lokur to Undivided Andhra Pradesh)	19 December 2011 (Became permanent)	35 days	Punjab & Haryana	2 July 2001	
Karanam Sreedhar Rao		13 August 2014 (Elevation of CJ A. M. Sapre to SCI)	20 October 2015 (Retirement as ACJ)	1 year, 69 days	Karnataka	21 February 2000	
T. Vaiphei		21 October 2015 (Retirement of ACJ K. Sreedhar Rao)	4 March 2016 (Appointment of Ajit Singh as new CJ)	136 days	Gauhati	17 July 2003	
A. K. Goswami		6 September 2018 (Retirement of CJ Ajit Singh)	28 October 2018 (Appointment of A. S. Bopanna as new CJ)	53 days	Gauhati	24 January 2011	
A. K. Goswami		24 May 2019 (Elevation of CJ A. S. Bopanna to SCI)	6 October 2019 (Appointment of Ajai Lamba as new CJ)	136 days	Gauhati	24 January 2011	
N. Kotiswar Singh		21 September 2020 (Retirement of CJ Ajai Lamba)	9 January 2021 (Appointment of Sudhanshu Dhulia as new CJ)	111 days	Manipur	17 October 2011	
N. Kotiswar Singh		9 May 2022 (Elevation of CJ Sudhanshu Dhulia to SCI)	22 June 2022 (Appointment of R. M. Chhaya as new CJ)	45 days	Manipur	17 October 2011	
N. Kotiswar Singh		12 January 2023 (Retirement of CJ R. M. Chhaya)	14 February 2023^{[§]} (Note: Elevated as Chief Justice of Jammu & Kashmir High Court) (Appointment of Sandeep Mehta as new CJ)	34 days	Manipur	17 October 2011	
L. Jamir		9 November 2023 (Elevation of CJ Sandeep Mehta to SCI)	4 February 2024 (Appointment of Vijay Bishnoi as new CJ)	88 days	Gauhati	22 May 2013	
L. Jamir		30 May 2025 (Elevation of CJ Vijay Bishnoi to SCI)	20 July 2025 (Note: Transferred as Judge to Calcutta High Court) (Appointment of Ashutosh Kumar as new CJ)	52 days	Gauhati	22 May 2013	

== Gujarat High Court ==
The Gujarat High Court was established on 1 May 1960 under the Bombay Reorganisation Act, 1960 and the first acting chief justice of the high court was J. M. Shelat appointed in 1963. 2022 Annual report of Gujarat High Court contains list of all former acting chief justices till the time of publishing report.

For Permanent chief justices

Name	Image	From (Reason)	To (Reason)	Tenure	Parent High Court	Date of initial Appointment
J. M. Shelat		23 May 1963 (Retirement of CJ K. T. Desai)	30 May 1963 (Became permanent)	8 days	Bombay	6 January 1957
N. M. Miabhoy		24 February 1966 (Elevation of CJ J. M. Shelat to SCI)	20 April 1966 (Became permanent)	126 days	Bombay	22 March 1957
Jayantilal Bapalal Mehta		30 June 1976 (Transfer of CJ B. J. Divan to Undivided Andhra Pradesh)	6 July 1976 (Transfer of Undivided AP CJ Obul Reddy as new CJ)	7 days	Gujarat	5 August 1963
Jayantilal Bapalal Mehta		19 August 1977 (Transfer of CJ Obul Reddy to Undivided Andhra Pradesh)	27 August 1977 (Transfer of Undivided AP CJ B. J. Divan as new CJ)	9 days	Gujarat	5 August 1963
P. D. Desai		15 March 1983 (Elevation of CJ M. P. Thakkar to SCI)	27 September 1983 (Transfer of Kerala CJ P. S. Poti as new CJ)	197 days	Gujarat	19 February 1970
Batukumar Kantiprasad Mehta		2 February 1985 (Retirement of CJ P. S. Poti)	20 March 1985 (Appointment of P. R. Gokulakrishnan as new CJ)	47 days	Gujarat	19 February 1970
Rameshkumar Chunilal Mankad		13 August 1990 (Retirement of CJ P. R. Gokulakrishnan)	1 December 1990 (Appointment of G. N. Ray as new CJ)	111 days	Gujarat	28 December 1977
Rameshkumar Chunilal Mankad		7 October 1991 (Elevation of CJ G. N. Ray to SCI)	18 February 1992 (Retirement as ACJ)	135 days	Gujarat	28 December 1977
Shailesh Bhadrayulal Majmudar		19 February 1992 (Retirement of ACJ R. C. Mankad)	14 June 1992 (Appointment of S. N. Sundaram as new CJ)	117 days	Gujarat	3 October 1978
R. A. Mehta		11 September 1995 (Elevation of CJ B. N. Kirpal to SCI)	1 July 1996 (Appointment of Gurudas Datta Kamat as new CJ)	294 days	Gujarat	5 September 1983
R. A. Mehta		5 January 1997 (Retirement of CJ Gurudas Datta Kamat)	19 October 1997; Transfer of P&H CJ Kumaran Sreedharan as new CJ)	288 days	Gujarat	5 September 1983
K. G. Balakrishnan	K. G. Balakrishnan	4 June 1998 (Retirement of CJ Kumaran Sreedharan)	15 July 1998 (Became permanent)	42 days	Kerala	26 September 1985
C. K. Thakker		9 September 1999 (Transfer of CJ K. G. Balakrishnan to Madras)	24 January 2000 (Appointment of D. M. Dharmadhikari as new CJ)	138 days	Gujarat	21 June 1990
B. C. Patel		5 March 2002 (Elevation of CJ D. M. Dharmadhikari to SCI)	16 March 2002 (Appointment of D. S. Sinha as new CJ)	12 days	Gujarat	21 June 1990
J. N. Bhatt		18 March 2003 (Retirement of CJ D. S. Sinha)	24 August 2003 (Transfer of MP CJ Bhawani Singh as new CJ)	160 days	Gujarat	21 June 1990
Behram Jahanbux Shethna		28 March 2006 (Retirement of CJ Bhawani Singh)	2 April 2006 (Transfer of Y. R. Meena as ACJ)	6 days	Gujarat	22 November 1990
Y. R. Meena		3 April 2006^{[+]} (Transferred as ACJ)	2 February 2007 (Became permanent)	306 days	Rajasthan	20 July 1990
M. S. Shah		1 July 2008 (Retirement of CJ Y. R. Meena)	3 September 2008 (Transfer of J&K CJ K. S. Radhakrishnan as new CJ)	65 days	Gujarat	18 September 1995
M. S. Shah		16 November 2009 (Elevation of CJ K. S. Radhakrishnan to SCI)	8 December 2009 (Appointment of S. J. Mukhopadhaya as new CJ)	23 days	Gujarat	18 September 1995
Ashokkumar Laxminarayan Dave		13 September 2011 (Elevation of CJ S. J. Mukhopadhaya to SCI)	7 November 2011 (Transfer of B. Bhattacharya as ACJ)	56 days	Gujarat	11 December 1997
B. Bhattacharya		8 November 2011^{[+]} (Transferred as ACJ)	20 July 2012 (Became permanent)	256 days	Calcutta	17 July 1997
Vijay Manohar Sahai		29 September 2014 (Retirement of CJ B. Bhattacharya)	12 August 2015 (Retirement as ACJ)	318 days	Allahabad	5 February 1999
Jayant Maganlal Patel		13 August 2015 (Retirement of ACJ V. M. Sahai)	12 February 2016 (Note: Transferred as Judge to Karnataka High Court) (Appointment of R. S. Reddy as new CJ)	184 days	Gujarat	3 December 2001
A. A. Kureshi		2 November 2018 (Elevation of CJ R. S. Reddy to SCI)	13 November 2018 (Himself transferred as Judge to Bombay)	12 days	Gujarat	7 March 2004
A. S. Dave		14 November 2018 (Transfer of ACJ A. A. Kureshi as Judge to Bombay)	9 September 2019 (Appointment of Vikram Nath as new CJ)	300 days	Gujarat	8 October 2004
Vineet Kothari		31 August 2021 (Elevation of CJ Vikram Nath to SCI)	2 September 2021 (Retirement as ACJ)	3 days	Rajasthan	13 June 2005
R. M. Chhaya		2 September 2021 (Retirement of ACJ Vineet Kothari)	12 October 2021 (Appointment of Aravind Kumar as new CJ)	41 days	Gujarat	17 February 2011
S. G. Gokani		13 February 2023 (Elevation of CJ Aravind Kumar to SCI)	15 February 2023 (Became permanent)	3 days	Gujarat	17 February 2011
A. J. Desai		26 February 2023 (Retirement of CJ S. G. Gokani)	22 July 2023^{[§]} (Note: Elevated as Chief Justice of Kerala High Court) (Appointment of Sunita Agarwal as new CJ)	147 days	Gujarat	21 November 2011

== Himachal Pradesh High Court ==
The Himachal Pradesh High Court was established on 25 January 1971 under the State of Himachal Pradesh Act, 1970 and the first acting chief justice of the high court was Dhruva Bihari Lal appointed in 1971.

For Permanent chief justices

Name	Image	From (Reason)	To (Reason)	Tenure	Parent High Court	Date of initial Appointment	Ref.
Dhruva Bihari Lal		10 December 1971 (Elevation of CJ M. H. Beg to SCI)	17 March 1972 (Appointment of R. S. Pathak as new CJ)	99 days	Himachal Pradesh	11 March 1971	
Tryambkalal Umedchand Mehta		20 February 1978 (Elevation of CJ R. S. Pathak to SCI)	24 July 1978 (Became permanent)	155 days	Gujarat	17 November 1969	
Hira Singh Thakur		1 October 1983 (Retirement of CJ Vyas Dev Misra)	22 December 1983 (Appointment of P. D. Desai as new CJ)	83 days	Himachal Pradesh	5 January 1979	
Vijaya Kumar Mehrotra		14 November 1988 (Transfer of CJ P. D. Desai to Calcutta)	28 March 1989 (Appointment of N. M. Kasliwal as new CJ)	135 days	Allahabad	30 March 1978	
Vijaya Kumar Mehrotra		6 October 1989 (Elevation of CJ N. M. Kasliwal to SCI)	5 November 1989 (Appointment of P. C. Balakrishna Menon as new CJ)	31 days	Allahabad	30 March 1978	
Vijaya Kumar Mehrotra		15 January 1991 (Retirement of CJ P. C. Balakrishna Menon)	4 August 1991 (Appointment of Leila Seth as new CJ)	202 days	Allahabad	30 March 1978	
Bhawani Singh		20 October 1992 (Retirement of CJ Leila Seth)	21 June 1993 (Appointment of S. K. Seth as new CJ)	245 days	Himachal Pradesh	16 December 1988	
Bhawani Singh		28 August 1993 (Retirement of CJ S. K. Seth)	28 January 1994 (Appointment of V. Ratnam as new CJ)	154 days	Himachal Pradesh	16 December 1988	
Bhawani Singh		1 August 1994 (Retirement of CJ V. Ratnam)	16 September 1994 (Appointment of Gulab Chand Gupta as new CJ)	47 days	Himachal Pradesh	16 December 1988	
Kamlesh Sharma		2 August 1996 (Transfer of CJ S. N. Phukan to Orissa)	11 August 1996 (Appointment of M. Srinivasan as new CJ)	10 days	Himachal Pradesh	25 June 1990	
Kamlesh Sharma		25 September 1997 (Elevation of CJ M. Srinivasan to SCI)	6 November 1997 (Appointment of M. N. Rao as new CJ)	43 days	Himachal Pradesh	25 June 1990	
Kamlesh Sharma		22 April 1998 (Retirement of CJ M. N. Rao)	30 June 1998 (Appointment of D. Raju as new CJ)	70 days	Himachal Pradesh	25 June 1990	
Kamlesh Sharma		29 January 2000 (Elevation of CJ D. Raju to SCI)	4 May 2000 (Appointment of C. K. Thakker as new CJ)	97 days	Himachal Pradesh	25 June 1990	
Kamlesh Sharma		31 December 2001 (Transfer of CJ C. K. Thakker to Bombay)	24 January 2002 (Transfer of Chhattisgarh CJ W. A. Shishak as new CJ)	25 days	Himachal Pradesh	25 June 1990	
Kamlesh Sharma		1 January 2003 (Retirement of CJ W. A. Shishak)	7 March 2003 (Transfer of Jharkhand CJ V. K. Gupta as new CJ)	66 days	Himachal Pradesh	25 June 1990	
Ram Bhawan Misra		10 August 2009 (Transfer of CJ Jagadish Bhalla to Rajasthan)	8 February 2010 (Appointment of Kurian Joseph as new CJ)	183 days	Allahabad	24 April 2001	
Ram Bhawan Misra		8 March 2013 (Elevation of CJ Kurian Joseph to SCI)	3 April 2013 (Appointment of A. M. Khanwilkar as new CJ)	27 days	Allahabad	24 April 2001	
Dev Darshan Sud		24 November 2013 (Transferred of CJ A. M. Khanwilkar to Madhya Pradesh)	26 November 2013 (Transfer of M. A. Mir as ACJ)	3 days	Himachal Pradesh	27 November 2006	
M. A. Mir		27 November 2013^{[+]} (Transferred as ACJ)	17 June 2014 (Became permanent)	203 days	Jammu & Kashmir	31 January 2005	
Sanjay Karol		25 April 2017 (Retirement of CJ M. A. Mir)	5 October 2018 (Appointment of Surya Kant as new CJ)	1 year, 164 days	Himachal Pradesh	8 March 2007	
D. C. Chaudhary		24 May 2019 (Elevation of CJ Surya Kant to SCI)	21 June 2019 (Appointment of V. Ramasubramanian as new CJ)	29 days	Himachal Pradesh	21 January 2012	
D. C. Chaudhary		23 September 2019 (Elevation of CJ V. Ramasubramanian to SCI)	5 October 2019 (Appointment of L. N. Swamy as new CJ)	13 days	Himachal Pradesh	21 January 2012	
Ravi Malimath		1 July 2021 (Retirement of CJ L. N. Swamy)	13 October 2021^{[§]} (Note: Elevated as Chief Justice of Madhya Pradesh High Court) (Transfer of MP CJ Mohammad Rafiq as new CJ)	105 days	Karnataka	18 February 2008	
Sabina		25 May 2022 (Retirement of CJ Mohammad Rafiq)	22 June 2022 (Appointment of A. A. Sayed as new CJ)	29 days	Punjab & Haryana	12 March 2008	
Sabina		21 January 2023 (Retirement of CJ A. A. Sayed)	19 April 2023 (Retirement as ACJ)	89 days	Punjab & Haryana	12 March 2008	
T. S. Chauhan		20 April 2023 (Retirement of ACJ Sabina)	29 May 2023 (Appointment of M. S. R. Rao as new CJ)	40 days	Himachal Pradesh	23 February 2014	
T. S. Chauhan		19 October 2024 (Retirement of CJ Rajiv Shakdher)	28 December 2024 (Appointment of G. S. Sandhawalia as new CJ)	71 days	Himachal Pradesh	23 February 2014	

== Jammu and Kashmir and Ladakh High Court ==
The Jammu and Kashmir and Ladakh High Court was established on 26 March 1928 under Letters Patent issued by then Maharaja of Kashmir, Jammu and Kashmir Reorganisation Act, 2019 and the first verifiably known acting chief justice of the high court was Mian Jalal-ud-Din appointed in 1977. Official website of Jammu & Kashmir & Ladakh maintains list of Acting Chief Justices after 2007 and for prior acting chief justices individual sources are given here.

For Permanent chief justices

Name	Image	From (Reason)	To (Reason)	Tenure	Parent High Court	Date of initial Appointment	Ref.
Mian Jalal-ud-Din		9 November 1977 (Retirement of CJ M. R. A. Ansari)	14 February 1978 (Became permanent)	98 days	Jammu & Kashmir	10 July 1968	
Mufti Baha-ud-Din		23 February 1980 (Retirement of CJ Mian Jalal-ud-Din)	6 March 1983 (Became permanent)	3 years, 12 days	Jammu & Kashmir	27 August 1971	
A. S. Anand		25 June 1984 (Elevation of CJ V. Khalid to SCI)	10 May 1985 (Became permanent)	320 days	Jammu & Kashmir	26 May 1975	
S. M. Rizvi		15 May 1993 (Retirement of CJ S. S. Kang)	9 October 1993 (Appointment of Satish Chandra Mathur as new CJ)	148 days	Jammu & Kashmir	30 May 1984	
S. M. Rizvi		23 September 1994 (Transfer of CJ S. S. Ahmad to Undivided AP)	9 October 1994 (Appointment of M. Ramakrishna as new CJ)	17 days	Jammu & Kashmir	30 May 1984	
H. K. Sema		23 August 2001 (Retirement of CJ Bhagwati Prasad Saraf)	11 September 2001 (Became permanent)	20 days	Gauhati	24 May 1989	
Vijay Kumar Jhanji		9 April 2002 (Elevation of CJ H. K. Sema to SCI)	14 May 2002 (Appointment of B. C. Patel as new CJ)	36 days	Punjab & Haryana	15 March 1991	
Vijay Kumar Jhanji		5 March 2003 (Transfer of CJ B. C. Patel to Delhi)	4 February 2004 (Appointment of Sachchidanand Jha as new CJ)	337 days	Punjab & Haryana	15 March 1991	
Bashir Ahmed Khan		12 October 2005^{[+]} (Note: ACJ of Delhi High Court transferred as ACJ) (Transfer of CJ Sachchidanand Jha to Rajasthan)	24 January 2007 (Became permanent)	1 year, 105 days	Jammu & Kashmir	12 November 1990	
N. A. Kakru		1 April 2007 (Retirement of CJ B. A. Khan)	5 June 2007 (Transfer of Aftab Alam as ACJ)	66 days	Jammu & Kashmir	26 November 1997	
N. A. Kakru		12 November 2007 (Elevation of ACJ Aftab Alam to SCI)	6 January 2008 (Appointment of K. S. Radhakrishnan as new CJ)	56 days	Jammu & Kashmir	26 November 1997	
N. A. Kakru		20 October 2008 (Retirement of CJ Manmohan Sarin)	2 January 2009 (Appointment of Barin Ghosh as new CJ)	75 days	Jammu & Kashmir	26 November 1997	
Aftab Alam		6 June 2007^{[+]} (Transferred as ACJ)	11 November 2007^{[/]} (Himself elevated to SCI)	159 days	Patna	27 July 1990	
F. M. I. Kalifulla		7 April 2011 (Retirement of CJ A. H. Saikia)	17 September 2011 (Became permanent)	164 days	Madras	2 March 2000	
Virender Singh		2 April 2012 (Elevation of CJ F. M. I. Kalifulla to SCI)	8 June 2012 (Appointment of M. M. Kumar as new CJ)	68 days	Punjab & Haryana	2 July 2002	
M. Y. Mir		5 January 2015 (Retirement of CJ M. M. Kumar)	2 February 2015 (Appointment of N. Paul Vasanthakumar as new CJ)	29 days	Jammu & Kashmir	23 November 2007	
R. Sudhakar		15 March 2017 (Retirement of CJ N. Paul Vasanthakumar)	31 March 2017 (Appointment of B. D. Ahmed as new CJ)	17 days	Madras	10 December 2005	
R. Sudhakar		16 March 2018 (Retirement of CJ B. D. Ahmed)	11 May 2018^{[§]} (Note: Elevated as Chief Justice of Manipur High Court) (Himself elevated as 5th CJ of Manipur)	57 days	Madras	10 December 2005	
Alok Aradhe		11 May 2018 (Elevation of ACJ R. Sudhakar as 5th CJ of Manipur)	10 August 2018 (Appointment of Gita Mittal as new CJ)	92 days	Madhya Pradesh	29 December 2009	
Rajesh Bindal		9 December 2020 (Retirement of CJ Gita Mittal)	3 January 2021 (Note: Transferred as Judge to Calcutta High Court) (Appointment of Pankaj Mithal as new CJ)	26 days	Punjab & Haryana	22 March 2006	
Tashi Rabstan		8 December 2022 (Retirement of CJ A. M. Magrey)	14 February 2023 (Appointment of N. K. Singh as new CJ)	69 days	Jammu & Kashmir	8 March 2013	
Tashi Rabstan		18 July 2024 (Elevation of CJ N. K. Singh to SCI)	26 September 2024 (Became permanent)	71 days	Jammu & Kashmir	8 March 2013	
Sanjeev Kumar		10 April 2025 (Retirement of CJ Tashi Rabstan)	15 April 2025 (Appointment of Arun Palli as new CJ)	6 days	Jammu & Kashmir	6 June 2017	
Sanjeev Kumar		2 June 2026 (Elevation of CJ Arun Palli to SCI)	8 September 2026 (Appointment of P. S. Bhati as new CJ)	99 days	Jammu & Kashmir	6 June 2017	

== Jharkhand High Court ==
The Jharkhand High Court was established on 15 November 2000 under Bihar Reorganisation Act, 2000 with Vinod Kumar Gupta as its inaugural acting chief justice.

For Permanent chief justices

Name	Image	From (Reason)	To (Reason)	Tenure	Parent High Court	Date of initial Appointment
V. K. Gupta		15 November 2000 (Creation of New HC)	4 December 2000 (Became permanent)	20 days	Jammu & Kashmir	7 November 1990
S. J. Mukhopadhaya		27 August 2004 (Elevation of CJ P. K. Balasubramanyan to SCI)	28 February 2005 (Appointment of A. Kabir as new CJ)	186 days	Patna	8 November 1994
S. J. Mukhopadhaya		9 September 2005 (Elevation of CJ A. Kabir to SCI)	3 December 2005 (Appointment of N. Dhinakar as new CJ)	86 days	Patna	8 November 1994
S. J. Mukhopadhaya		10 June 2006 (Retirement of CJ N. Dhinakar)	28 August 2006 (Himself transferred as Judge to Madras)	80 days	Patna	8 November 1994
M. Y. Eqbal		29 August 2006 (Transfer of ACJ S. J. Mukhopadhaya as Judge to Madras)	16 September 2006 (Appointment of M. K. Vinayagam as new CJ)	19 days	Jharkhand	9 May 1996
M. Y. Eqbal		16 May 2008 (Retirement of CJ M. K. Vinayagam)	12 July 2008 (Appointment of G. S. Misra as new CJ)	58 days	Jharkhand	9 May 1996
M. Y. Eqbal		1 May 2010 (Elevation of CJ G. S. Misra to SCI)	10 June 2010^{[§]} (Note: Elevated as Chief Justice of Madras High Court) (Himself elevated as 36th CJ of Madras)	41 days	Jharkhand	9 May 1996
Sushil Harkauli		11 June 2010 (Elevation of ACJ M. Y. Eqbal as 36th CJ of Madras)	21 August 2010 (Appointment of Bhagwati Prasad as new CJ)	72 days	Allahabad	5 February 1999
P. C. Tatia		13 May 2011 (Retirement of CJ Bhagwati Prasad)	10 September 2011 (Became permanent)	121 days	Rajasthan	11 January 2001
D. N. Patel		4 August 2013 (Retirement of CJ P. C. Tatia)	15 November 2013 (Appointment of R. Banumathi as new CJ)	104 days	Gujarat	7 March 2004
D. N. Patel		13 August 2014 (Elevation of CJ R. Banumathi to SCI)	31 October 2014 (Appointment of Virender Singh as new CJ)	80 days	Gujarat	7 March 2004
D. N. Patel		10 June 2017 (Retirement of CJ P. K. Mohanty)	10 August 2018 (Appointment of A. Bose as new CJ)	1 year, 62 days	Gujarat	7 March 2004
D. N. Patel		24 May 2019 (Elevation of CJ A. Bose to SCI)	6 June 2019^{[§]} (Note: Elevated as Chief Justice of Delhi High Court) (Himself elevated as 31st CJ of Delhi)	14 days	Gujarat	7 March 2004
P. K. Mohanty		7 October 2016 (Retirement of CJ Virender Singh)	23 March 2017 (Became permanent)	168 days	Orissa	7 March 2002
Prashant Kumar		7 June 2019 (Elevation of ACJ D. N. Patel as 31st CJ of Delhi)	30 August 2019^{[†]} (Died in office)	85 days	Jharkhand	21 January 2009
H. C. Mishra		30 August 2019 (Death of ACJ Prashant Kumar)	16 November 2019 (Appointment of Ravi Ranjan as new CJ)	79 days	Jharkhand	27 April 2011
A. K. Singh		20 December 2022 (Retirement of CJ Ravi Ranjan)	19 February 2023 (Appointment of S. K. Mishra as new CJ)	62 days	Jharkhand	24 January 2012
Shree Chandrashekhar		29 December 2023 (Retirement of CJ S. K. Mishra)	4 July 2024 (Note: Transferred as Judge to Rajasthan High Court) (Appointment of B. R. Sarangi as new CJ)	189 days	Jharkhand	17 January 2013
S. N. Prasad		20 July 2024 (Retirement of CJ B. R. Sarangi)	24 September 2024 (Transfer of HP CJ M. S. R. Rao as new CJ)	67 days	Jharkhand	26 September 2014
S. N. Prasad		22 July 2025 (Transfer of CJ M. S. R. Rao to Tripura)	23 July 2025 (Appointment of T. S. Chauhan as new CJ)	2 days	Jharkhand	26 September 2014

== Karnataka High Court ==
The Karnataka High Court was established in 1884 under the Mysore High Court Act, 1884 and the first acting chief justice of the high court was Nittoor Srinivasa Rau appointed in 1957.

For Permanent chief justices

Name	Image	From (Reason)	To (Reason)	Tenure	Parent High Court	Date of initial Appointment	Ref.
N. Srinivasa Rau		16 July 1957 (Retirement of CJ R. Venkataramaiah)	24 July 1957 (Appointment of S. R. Das Gupta as new CJ)	9 days	Karnataka	11 June 1955	
N. Srinivasa Rau		14 August 1961 (Retirement of CJ S. R. Das Gupta)	28 March 1962 (Became permanent)	227 days	Karnataka	11 June 1955	
Hombe Gowda		7 August 1963 (Retirement of CJ N. S. Rau)	1 August 1969^{[†]} (Died in office)	5 years, 360 days	Karnataka	11 June 1955	
A. R. Somanath Iyer		1 August 1969 (Death of ACJ Hombe Gowda)	22 November 1969 (Became permanent)	64 days	Karnataka	11 July 1957	
C. Honniah		15 December 1977 (Retirement of CJ G. K. Govinda Bhat)	21 March 1978 (Transfer of Allahabad CJ D. M. Chandrashekhar as new CJ)	97 days	Karnataka	15 March 1965	
K. Bhimaiah		26 September 1982 (Retirement of CJ D. M. Chandrshekhar)	27 October 1982 (Became permanent)	32 days	Karnataka	19 July 1965	
V. S. Malimath		11 April 1983 (Retirement of CJ K. Bhimaiah)	5 February 1984 (Became permanent)	301 days	Karnataka	5 March 1970	
K. Jagannatha Shetty		24 October 1985 (Transfer of CJ V. S. Malimath to Kerala)	27 August 1986 (Transfer of P&H CJ Prem Chand Jain as new CJ)	308 days	Karnataka	25 June 1970	
M. Rama Jois		17 September 1989 (Retirement of CJ Prem Chand Jain)	25 October 1989 (Transfer of Madras CJ S. Mohan as new CJ)	39 days	Karnataka	28 November 1977	
M. Rama Jois		7 October 1991 (Elevation of CJ S. Mohan to SCI)	31 October 1991 (Appointment of S. P. Bharucha as new CJ)	25 days	Karnataka	28 November 1977	
K. A. Swamy		1 July 1992 (Elevation of CJ S. P. Bharucha to SCI)	1 July 1993^{[§]} (Note: Elevated as Chief Justice of Madras High Court) (Transfer of Undivided AP CJ Shailesh Bhadrayulal Majumdar as new CJ)	1 year, 1 day	Karnataka	1 January 1979	
M. Ramakrishna		19 September 1994 (Elevation of CJ Shailesh Bhadrayulal Majumdar to SCI)	27 September 1994 (Transfer of Orissa CJ G. T. Nanavati as new CJ)	9 days	Karnataka	10 January 1983	
Syed Abdul Hakeem		6 March 1995 (Elevation of CJ G. T. Nanavati to SCI)	27 July 1995 (Appointment of Madhav Laxman Pendse as new CJ)	144 days	Karnataka	25 May 1984	
Syed Abdul Hakeem		26 March 1996 (Resignation of CJ Madhav Laxman Pendse)	2 May 1996 (Became permanent)	38 days	Karnataka	25 May 1984	
S. Rajendra Babu		10 May 1996 (Retirement of CJ S. A. Hakeem)	28 June 1996 (Appointment of R. P. Sethi as new CJ)	50 days	Karnataka	19 February 1988	
Y. B. Rao		7 January 1999 (Elevation of CJ R. P. Sethi to SCI)	8 March 1999 (Became permanent)	61 days	Andhra Pradesh	11 July 1986	
Ashok Bhan		27 June 2000 (Retirement of CJ Y. B. Rao)	20 October 2000 (Appointment of P. Venkatarama Reddi as new CJ)	116 days	Punjab & Haryana	15 June 1990	
G. C. Bharuka		17 August 2001 (Elevation of CJ P. Venkatarama Reddi to SCI)	30 August 2001 (Transfer of Madras CJ N. K. Jain as new CJ)	14 days	Patna	27 July 1990	
S. R. Nayak		20 October 2004 (Retirement of CJ N. K. Jain)	18 November 2004 (Transfer of Kerala CJ N. K. Sodhi as new CJ)	30 days	Karnataka	25 February 1994	
B. Padmaraj		29 November 2005 (Retirement of CJ N. K. Sodhi)	6 January 2006 (Transfer of Uttarakhand CJ Cyriac Joseph as new CJ)	39 days	Karnataka	30 November 1994	
Deepak Verma		7 July 2008 (Elevation of CJ Cyriac Joseph to SCI)	7 August 2008 (Appointment of P. D. Dinakaran as new CJ)	32 days	Madhya Pradesh	15 December 1994	
Vikramajit Sen		13 September 2011 (Elevation of CJ J. S. Khehar to SCI)	23 December 2011 (Became permanent)	102 days	Delhi	7 July 1999	
Karanam Sreedhar Rao		25 December 2012 (Elevation of CJ Vikramajit Sen to SCI)	6 March 2013 (Appointment of D. H. Waghela as new CJ)	72 days	Karnataka	21 February 2000	
S. K. Mukherjee		4 June 2015 (Transfer of CJ D. H. Waghela to Orissa)	22 February 2016 (Became permanent)	264 days	Calcutta	15 September 2000	
Humchadakatte G. Ramesh		10 October 2017 (Retirement of CJ S. K. Mukherjee)	12 February 2018 (Transfer of Meghalaya CJ Dinesh Maheshwari as new CJ)	126 days	Karnataka	12 May 2003	
L. N. Swamy		18 January 2019 (Elevation of CJ Dinesh Maheshwari to SCI)	9 May 2019 (Appointment of A. S. Oka as new CJ)	112 days	Karnataka	4 July 2007	
S. C. Sharma		31 August 2021 (Elevation of CJ A. S. Oka to SCI)	10 October 2021^{[§]} (Note: Elevated as Chief Justice of Telangana High Court) (Appointment of R. R. Awasthi as new CJ)	41 days	Madhya Pradesh	18 January 2008	
Alok Aradhe		3 July 2022 (Retirement of CJ R. R. Awasthi)	14 October 2022 (Appointment of P. B. Varale as new CJ)	104 days	Madhya Pradesh	29 December 2009	
P. S. Dinesh Kumar		25 January 2024 (Elevation of CJ P. B. Varale to SCI)	2 February 2024 (Became permanent)	9 days	Karnataka	2 January 2015	
V. Kameswar Rao		30 May 2025 (Elevation of CJ N. V. Anjaria to SCI)	18 July 2025 (Note: Transferred as Judge to Delhi High Court) (Appointment of Vibhu Bakhru as new CJ)	50 days	Delhi	17 April 2013	

== Kerala High Court ==
The Kerala High Court was established on 1 November 1956 under States Reorganisation Act, 1956 and the first acting chief justice of the high court was P. S. Poti appointed in 1981. History section of website of Kerala Judicial Academy contains list of former chief justices of Kerala High Court (both acting and permanent) after 1986. Thus the list contained in this website would serve as primary reference for acting chief justices after 1986.

For Permanent chief justices

Name	Image	From (Reason)	To (Reason)	Tenure	Parent High Court	Date of initial Appointment
P. S. Poti		29 January 1981 (Elevation of CJ V. B. Eradi to SCI)	5 June 1983 (Became permanent)	2 years, 127 days	Kerala	20 March 1969
K. Bhaskaran		28 September 1983 (Transfer of CJ P. S. Poti to Gujarat)	20 March 1985 (Became permanent)	1 year, 174 days	Kerala	3 April 1972
T. K. Thommen		9 October 1985 (Transfer of CJ K. Bhaskaran to Undivided AP)	24 October 1985 (Transfer of Karnataka CJ V. S. Malimath as new CJ)	16 days	Kerala	9 May 1975
U. L. Bhat		11 June 1991 (Retirement of CJ V. S. Malimath)	7 August 1991 (Appointment of M. J. Rao as new CJ)	58 days	Kerala	18 September 1980
Varghese Kalliath		6 April 1994 (Transfer of CJ M. J. Rao to Delhi)	20 April 1994 (Transfer of Bombay CJ Sujata Manohar as new CJ)	15 days	Kerala	11 June 1984
K. T. Thomas		18 September 1995 (Retirement of CJ M. M. Pareed Pillay)	26 March 1996^{[/]} (Himself elevated to SCI)	191 days	Kerala	12 August 1985
K. Sreedharan		27 March 1996 (Elevation of ACJ K. T. Thomas to SCI)	22 July 1996 (Appointment of Uday Pratap Singh as new CJ)	118 days	Kerala	10 September 1985
G. Rajasekharan		20 March 1999 (Retirement of CJ O. P. Verma)	23 May 1999 (Retirement as ACJ)	65 days	Kerala	23 November 1989
A. R. Lakshmanan		23 May 1999 (Retirement of ACJ G. Rajasekharan)	19 September 1999 (Appointment of A. Pasayat as new CJ)	120 days	Madras	14 June 1990
A. R. Lakshmanan		8 May 2000 (Transfer of CJ A. Pasayat to Delhi)	27 May 2000^{[§]} (Note: Elevated as Chief Justice of Rajasthan High Court) (Himself elevated as 22nd CJ of Rajasthan)	20 days	Madras	14 June 1990
K. K. Usha		28 May 2000 (Elevation of ACJ A. R. Lakshmanan as 22nd CJ of Rajasthan)	29 May 2000 (Appointment of Arvind Vinayakarao Savant as new CJ)	2 days	Kerala	25 February 1991
K. K. Usha		17 September 2000 (Retirement of CJ Arvind Vinayakarao Savant)	29 November 2000 (Became permanent)	74 days	Kerala	25 February 1991
P. K. Balasubramanyan		3 July 2001 (Retirement of CJ K. K. Usha)	6 September 2001 (Appointment of B. N. Srikrishna as new CJ)	66 days	Kerala	4 June 1992
Cyriac Joseph		2 October 2002 (Elevation of CJ B. N. Srikrishna to SCI)	1 November 2002 (Appointment of J. L. Gupta as new CJ)	31 days	Kerala	6 July 1994
Cyriac Joseph		18 November 2004 (Transfer of CJ N. K. Sodhi to Karnataka)	20 November 2004 (Transfer of Madras CJ B. S. Reddy as new CJ)	3 days	Kerala	6 July 1994
Cyriac Joseph		2 March 2005 (Retirement of CJ B. S. Reddy)	18 March 2005^{[§]} (Note: Elevated as Chief Justice of Uttarakhand High Court) (Himself elevated as 4th CJ of Uttarakhand)	17 days	Kerala	6 July 1994
N. K. Sodhi		22 January 2004 (Retirement of CJ J. L. Gupta)	5 April 2004 (Became permanent)	75 days	Punjab & Haryana	15 March 1991
K. S. Radhakrishnan		19 March 2005 (Elevation of ACJ Cyriac Joseph as 4th CJ of Uttarakhand)	26 April 2005 (Appointment of Rajeev Gupta as new CJ)	39 days	Kerala	17 May 1995
K. S. Radhakrishnan		11 January 2006 (Transfer of CJ Rajeev Gupta to Uttarakhand)	21 January 2006 (Appointment of V. K. Bali as new CJ)	11 days	Kerala	17 May 1995
K. S. Radhakrishnan		24 January 2007 (Retirement of CJ V. K. Bali)	17 May 2007 (Transfer of Chhattisgarh CJ H. L. Dattu as new CJ)	114 days	Kerala	17 May 1995
J. B. Koshy		16 December 2008 (Elevation of CJ H. L. Dattu to SCI)	13 March 2009^{[§]} (Note: Elevated as Chief Justice of Patna High Court) (Himself elevated as 34th CJ of Patna)	88 days	Kerala	17 January 1996
Kurian Joseph		14 March 2009 (Elevation of ACJ J. B. Koshy as 34th CJ of Patna)	17 March 2009 (Appointment of S. R. Bannurmath as new CJ)	4 days	Kerala	12 July 2000
Kurian Joseph		23 January 2010 (Retirement of CJ S. R. Bannurmath)	5 February 2010^{[§]} (Note: Elevated as Chief Justice of Himachal Pradesh High Court) (Himself elevated as 20th CJ of HP)	14 days	Kerala	12 July 2000
P. R. Raman		6 February 2010 (Elevation of ACJ Kurian Joseph as 20th CJ of HP)	16 March 2010 (Transfer of Gauhati CJ J. Chelameswar as new CJ)	39 days	Kerala	7 September 2001
C. N. Ramachandran Nair		10 October 2011 (Elevation of CJ J. Chelameswar to SCI)	8 November 2011 (Transfer of Manjula Chellur as ACJ)	30 days	Kerala	7 September 2001
Manjula Chellur		9 November 2011^{[+]} (Transferred as ACJ)	25 September 2012 (Became permanent)	322 days	Karnataka	21 February 2000
Ashok Bhushan		2 August 2014 (Transfer of CJ Manjula Chellur to Calcutta)	25 March 2015 (Became permanent)	236 days	Allahabad	24 April 2001
T. B. Radhakrishnan		13 May 2016 (Elevation of CJ Ashok Bhushan to SCI)	31 July 2016 (Transfer of M. Shantanagoudar as ACJ)	80 days	Kerala	14 October 2004
T. B. Radhakrishnan		16 February 2017 (Elevation of CJ M. Shantanagoudar to SCI)	17 March 2017^{[§]} (Note: Elevated as Chief Justice of Chhattisgarh High Court) (Himself elevated as 11th CJ of Chhattisgarh)	30 days	Kerala	14 October 2004
Mohan Shantanagoudar		1 August 2016^{[+]} (Transferred as ACJ)	21 September 2016 (Became permanent)	52 days	Karnataka	12 May 2003
Antony Dominic		17 March 2017 (Elevation of ACJ T. B. Radhakrishnan as 11th CJ of Chhattisgarh)	20 March 2017 (Appointment of N. P. Singh as new CJ)	4 days	Kerala	30 January 2007
Antony Dominic		6 November 2017 (Retirement of CJ N. P. Singh)	8 February 2018 (Became permanent)	95 days	Kerala	30 January 2007
Hrishikesh Roy		30 May 2018^{[+]} (Note: Judge of Gauhati High Court transferred as ACJ) (Retirement of CJ Antony Dominic)	7 August 2018 (Became permanent)	70 days	Gauhati	12 October 2006
C. K. Abdul Rehim		22 September 2019 (Elevation of CJ Hrishikesh Roy to SCI)	11 October 2019 (Appointment of S. Manikumar as new CJ)	20 days	Kerala	5 January 2009
S. V. N. Bhatti		24 April 2023 (Retirement of CJ S. Manikumar)	31 May 2023 (Became permanent)	38 days	Andhra Pradesh	12 April 2013
Alexander Thomas		14 July 2023 (Elevation of CJ S. V. N. Bhatti to SCI)	21 July 2023 (Appointment of A. J. Desai as new CJ)	8 days	Kerala	23 January 2014
A. M. Mustaque		5 July 2024 (Retirement of CJ A. J. Desai)	25 September 2024 (Appointment of N. M. Jamdar as new CJ)	83 days	Kerala	23 January 2014

== Madhya Pradesh High Court ==
The Madhya Pradesh High Court was established on 2 January 1936 under the Government of India Act 1935 and the first acting chief justice of the high court was G. P. Singh appointed in 1978. Official website of Madhya Pradesh High Court maintains official list of Acting chief justices alongside permanent chief justices.

For Permanent chief justices

Name	Image	From (Reason)	To (Reason)	Tenure	Parent High Court	Date of initial Appointment
G. P. Singh		17 July 1978 (Elevation of CJ A. P. Sen to SCI)	26 July 1978 (Became permanent)	10 days	Madhya Pradesh	7 November 1967
G. L. Oza		4 January 1984 (Retirement of CJ G. P. Singh)	30 November 1984 (Became permanent)	332 days	Madhya Pradesh	29 July 1968
J. S. Verma		27 October 1985 (Elevation of CJ G. L. Oza to SCI)	13 June 1986 (Became permanent)	230 days	Madhya Pradesh	12 September 1972
G. G. Sohani		31 August 1986 (Transfer of CJ J. S. Verma to Rajasthan)	7 January 1987 (Appointment of N. D. Ojha as new CJ)	130 days	Madhya Pradesh	2 June 1973
G. G. Sohani		19 January 1988 (Elevation of CJ N. D. Ojha to SCI)	19 October 1989 (Became permanent)	1 year, 274 days	Madhya Pradesh	2 June 1973
A. K. Mathur		13 October 1995 (Retirement of CJ U. L. Bhat)	2 February 1996 (Became permanent)	113 days	Rajasthan	13 July 1985
Devendra Pal Singh Chauhan		22 December 1999 (Transfer of CJ A. K. Mathur to Calcutta)	23 February 2000 (Transfer of J&K CJ Bhawani Singh as new CJ)	64 days	Allahabad	3 January 1989
Rajiv Gupta		24 August 2003 (Transfer of CJ Bhawani Singh to Gujarat)	5 September 2003 (Appointment of K. Rajarathnam as new CJ)	13 days	Madhya Pradesh	27 September 1994
Rajiv Gupta		13 March 2004 (Retirement of CJ K. Rajarathnam)	7 July 2004 (Appointment of R. V. Raveendran as new CJ)	117 days	Madhya Pradesh	27 September 1994
Deepak Verma		9 September 2005 (Elevation of CJ R. V. Raveendran to SCI)	1 October 2005 (Transfer of Chhattisgarh CJ A. K. Patnaik as new CJ)	23 days	Madhya Pradesh	15 December 1994
R. S. Garg		17 November 2009 (Elevation of CJ A. K. Patnaik to SCI)	19 December 2009 (Appointment of S. R. Alam as new CJ)	33 days	Madhya Pradesh	15 December 1994
Sushil Harkauli		5 August 2011 (Transfer of CJ S. R. Alam to Allahabad)	16 October 2012 (Note: Transferred as Judge to Allahabad High Court) (Appointment of S. A. Bobde as new CJ)	1 year, 73 days	Allahabad	5 February 1999
Krishn Kumar Lahoti		12 April 2013 (Elevation of CJ S. A. Bobde to SCI)	23 November 2013 (Transfer of HP CJ A. M. Khanwilkar as new CJ)	226 days	Madhya Pradesh	22 October 2001
Rajendra Menon		13 May 2016 (Elevation of CJ A. M. Khanwilkar to SCI)	14 March 2017^{[§]} (Note: Elevated as Chief Justice of Patna High Court) (Himself elevated as 40th CJ of Patna)	306 days	Madhya Pradesh	1 April 2002
S. K. Seth		15 March 2017 (Elevation of ACJ Rajendra Menon as 40th CJ of Patna)	18 March 2017 (Appointment of Hemant Gupta as new CJ)	3 days	Madhya Pradesh	21 March 2003
S. K. Seth		2 November 2018 (Elevation of CJ Hemant Gupta to SCI)	13 November 2018 (Became permanent)	12 days	Madhya Pradesh	21 March 2003
R. S. Jha		10 June 2019 (Retirement of CJ S. K. Seth)	5 October 2019^{[§]} (Note: Elevated as Chief Justice of Punjab & Haryana High Court) (Himself elevated as 35th CJ of P&H)	118 days	Madhya Pradesh	18 October 2005
Sanjay Yadav		6 October 2019 (Elevation of ACJ R. S. Jha as 35th CJ of P&H)	2 November 2019 (Transfer of Meghalaya CJ A. K. Mittal as new CJ)	28 days	Madhya Pradesh	2 March 2007
Sanjay Yadav		30 September 2020 (Retirement of CJ A. K. Mittal)	2 January 2021 (Transfer of Orissa CJ Mohammad Rafiq as new CJ)	95 days	Madhya Pradesh	2 March 2007
Sheel Nagu		25 May 2024 (Retirement of CJ R. V. Malimath)	8 July 2024^{[§]} (Himself elevated as 36th CJ of P&H)	45 days	Madhya Pradesh	27 May 2011
Sanjeev Sachdeva		9 July 2024 (Elevation of ACJ Sheel Nagu as 36th CJ of P&H)	24 September 2024 (Appointment of S. K. Kait as new CJ)	78 days	Delhi	17 April 2013
Sanjeev Sachdeva		24 May 2025 (Retirement of CJ S. K. Kait)	16 July 2025 (Became permanent)	54 days	Delhi	17 April 2013
Vivek Rusia		2 June 2026 (Elevation of CJ Sanjeev Sachdeva to SCI)	9 September 2026 (Appointment of A. Y. Kogje as new CJ)	100 days	Madhya Pradesh	7 April 2016

== Madras High Court ==
The Madras High Court was established on 15 August 1862 under the Indian High Courts Act 1861 and the first verifiably known acting chief justice of the high court was S. Ramachandra Iyer appointed in 1961.

For Permanent chief justices

Name	Image	From (Reason)	To (Reason)	Tenure	Parent High Court	Date of initial Appointment	Ref..
S. Ramachandra Iyer		10 May 1961 (Retirement of CJ P. V. Rajamannar)	15 September 1961 (Became permanent)	129 days	Madras	29 January 1958	
P. R. Gokulakrishnan		10 July 1981 (Resignation of CJ M. M. Ismail)	11 March 1982 (Transfer of Patna CJ K. B. N. Singh as new CJ)	245 days	Madras	11 July 1969	
P. R. Gokulakrishnan		25 January 1984 (Retirement of CJ K. B. N. Singh)	2 April 1984 (Transfer of Bombay CJ M. N. Chandurkar as new CJ)	69 days	Madras	11 July 1969	
S. R. Pandian		14 March 1988 (Retirement of CJ M. N. Chandurkar)	13 December 1988^{[/]} (Himself elevated to SCI)	275 days	Madras	27 February 1974	
S. Mohan		14 December 1988 (Elevation of ACJ S. R. Pandian to SCI)	18 October 1989 (Became permanent)	309 days	Madras	27 February 1974	
S. N. Sundaram		18 November 1991 (Elevation of CJ A. S. Anand to SCI)	14 June 1992^{[§]} (Note: Elevated as Chief Justice of Gujarat High Court) (Appointment of K. K. Bhatnagar as new CJ)	210 days	Madras	4 January 1978	
V. Ratnam		15 November 1992 (Retirement of CJ K. K. Bhatnagar)	30 June 1993 (Appointment of K. A. Swamy as new CJ)	228 days	Madras	25 January 1979	
K. A. Thanikkachallam		20 March 1997 (Retirement of CJ K. A. Swamy)	6 July 1997 (Appointment of M. S. Liberhan as new CJ)	109 days	Madras	14 August 1988	
Shivaraj Patil		28 December 1998 (Transfer of CJ M. S. Liberhan to Undivided AP)	19 January 1999^{[§]} (Note: Elevated as Chief Justice of Rajasthan High Court) (Himself elevated as 21st CJ of Rajasthan)	23 days	Karnataka	29 March 1990	
N. K. Jain		20 January 1999 (Elevation of ACJ Shivaraj Patil as 21st CJ of Rajasthan)	23 May 1999 (Appointment of A. C. Agarwal as new CJ)	124 days	Rajasthan	20 July 1990	
N. K. Jain		27 August 1999 (Retirement of CJ A. C. Agarwal)	8 September 1999 (Transfer of Gujarat CJ K. G. Balakrishnan as new CJ)	13 days	Rajasthan	20 July 1990	
N. K. Jain		7 June 2000 (Elevation of CJ K. G. Balakrishnan to SCI)	12 September 2000 (Became permanent)	98 days	Rajasthan	20 July 1990	
K. Narayana Kurup		31 August 2001 (Transfer of CJ N. K. Jain to Karnataka)	11 September 2001 (Appointment of B. S. Reddy as new CJ)	12 days	Kerala	20 October 1992	
N. Dhinakar		21 November 2004 (Transfer of CJ B. S. Reddy to Kerala)	27 November 2004 (Appointment of Markandey Katju as new CJ)	7 days	Madras	17 October 1994	
N. Dhinakar		11 October 2005 (Transfer of CJ Markandey Katju to Delhi)	11 November 2005 (Appointment of A. P. Shah as new CJ)	32 days	Madras	17 October 1994	
S. J. Mukhopadhaya		10 May 2008 (Transfer of CJ A. P. Shah to Delhi)	18 May 2008 (Transfer of Orissa CJ A. K. Ganguly as new CJ)	9 days	Patna	8 November 1994	
S. J. Mukhopadhaya		16 December 2008 (Elevation of CJ A. K. Ganguly to SCI)	8 March 2009 (Transfer of Allahabad CJ H. L. Gokhale as new CJ)	83 days	Patna	8 November 1994	
Elipe Dharma Rao		29 April 2010 (Elevation of CJ H. L. Gokhale to SCI)	10 June 2010 (Appointment of M. Y. Eqbal as new CJ)	43 days	Andhra Pradesh	17 May 1999	
Elipe Dharma Rao		24 December 2012 (Elevation of CJ M. Y. Eqbal to SCI)	6 February 2013 (Transfer of R. K. Agrawal as ACJ)	45 days	Andhra Pradesh	17 May 1999	
R. K. Agrawal		7 February 2013^{[+]} (Transferred as ACJ)	23 October 2013 (Became permanent)	259 days	Allahabad	5 February 1999	
S. K. Agnihotri		16 February 2014 (Elevation of CJ R. K. Agrawal to SCI)	25 July 2014 (Transfer of P&H CJ S. K. Kaul as new CJ)	160 days	Chhattisgarh	5 May 2005	
Huluvadi G. Ramesh		16 February 2017 (Elevation of CJ S. K. Kaul to SCI)	4 April 2017 (Appointment of I. Banerjee as new CJ)	48 days	Karnataka	8 September 2003	
Huluvadi G. Ramesh		7 August 2018 (Elevation of CJ I. Banerjee to SCI)	11 August 2018 (Appointment of V. K. Tahilramani as new CJ)	5 days	Karnataka	8 September 2003	
Vineet Kothari		7 September 2019 (Resignation of CJ V. K. Tahilramani)	10 November 2019 (Transfer of Patna CJ A. P. Sahi as new CJ)	65 days	Rajasthan	13 June 2005	
Vineet Kothari		1 January 2021 (Retirement of CJ A. P. Sahi)	3 January 2021 (Note: Transferred as Judge to Gujarat High Court) (Appointment of S. Banerjee as new CJ)	3 days	Rajasthan	13 June 2005	
M. Duraiswamy		17 November 2021 (Transfer of CJ S. Banerjee to Meghalaya)	21 November 2021 (Transfer of M. N. Bhandari as ACJ)	5 days	Madras	31 March 2009	
M. Duraiswamy		13 September 2022 (Retirement of CJ M. N. Bhandari)	21 September 2022 (Retirement as ACJ)	9 days	Madras	31 March 2009	
M. N. Bhandari		22 November 2021^{[+]} (Transferred as ACJ)	13 February 2022 (Became permanent)	84 days	Rajasthan	5 July 2007	
T. Raja		22 September 2022 (Retirement of ACJ M. Duraiswamy)	24 May 2023 (Retirement as ACJ)	245 days	Madras	31 March 2009	
S. Vaidyanathan		25 May 2023 (Retirement of ACJ T. Raja)	27 May 2023 (Appointment of S. V. Gangapurwala as new CJ)	3 days	Madras	25 October 2013	
R. Mahadevan		24 May 2024 (Retirement of CJ S. V. Gangapurwala)	17 July 2024^{[/]} (Himself elevated to SCI)	55 days	Madras	25 October 2013	
D. Krishnakumar		18 July 2024 (Elevation of ACJ R. Mahadevan to SCI)	26 September 2024 (Appointment of K. R. Shriram as new CJ)	72 days	Madras	7 April 2016	

== Manipur High Court ==
The Manipur High Court was established on 25 March 2013 under the North-Eastern Areas (Reorganisation) and Other Related Laws (Amendment) Act, 2012 and the first acting chief justice of the high court was L. K. Mohapatra appointed in 2013.

For Permanent chief justices

Name	Image	From (Reason)	To (Reason)	Tenure	Parent High Court	Date of initial Appointment
L. K. Mohapatra		21 October 2013^{[+]} (Note: ACJ of Allahabad High Court transferred as ACJ) (Transfer of CJ A. M. Sapre to Gauhati)	9 July 2014 (Became permanent)	262 days	Orissa	16 January 1999
R. R. Prasad		10 June 2016 (Retirement of CJ L. K. Mohapatra)	21 September 2016 (Became permanent)	245 days	Jharkhand	27 February 2006
N. Kotiswar Singh		1 July 2017 (Retirement of CJ R. R. Prasad)	8 February 2018 (Appointment of Abhilasha Kumari as new CJ)	223 days	Manipur	17 October 2011
N. Kotiswar Singh		24 February 2018 (Retirement of CJ Abhilasha Kumari)	17 May 2018 (Appointment of R. Sudhakar as new CJ)	83 days	Manipur	17 October 2011
M. V. Muralidaran		6 February 2023 (Elevation of CJ P. V. Sanjay Kumar to SCI)	19 October 2023 (Note: Transferred as Judge to Calcutta High Court) (Appointment of Siddharth Mridul as new CJ)	256 days	Madras	7 April 2016

== Meghalaya High Court ==
The Meghalaya High Court was established on 23 March 2013 under the North-Eastern Areas (Reorganisation) and Other Related Laws (Amendment) Act, 2012 and the first acting chief justice of the high court was T. Nandakumar Singh appointed in 2013.

For Permanent chief justices

Name	Image	From (Reason)	To (Reason)	Tenure	Parent High Court	Date of initial Appointment
T. Nandakumar Singh		4 August 2013 (Retirement of CJ T. Meena Kumari)	19 September 2013 (Appointment of P. C. Pant as new CJ)	47 days	Gauhati	25 November 2004
T. Nandakumar Singh		13 August 2014 (Elevation of CJ P. C. Pant to SCI)	26 August 2014 (Transfer of U. N. Singh as ACJ)	14 days	Gauhati	25 November 2004
T. Nandakumar Singh		15 January 2016 (Retirement of CJ U. N. Singh)	31 January 2016 (Retirement as ACJ)	17 days	Gauhati	25 November 2004
U. N. Singh		27 August 2014^{[+]} (Transferred as ACJ)	18 March 2015 (Became permanent)	204 days	Madhya Pradesh	22 October 2001
Sudip Ranjan Sen		1 February 2016 (Retirement of ACJ T. N. Singh)	23 February 2016 (Appointment of Dinesh Maheshwari as new CJ)	24 days	Gauhati	6 February 2012
Sudip Ranjan Sen		3 March 2018 (Retirement of CJ Tarun Agarwala)	20 May 2018 (Appointment of M. Y. Mir as new CJ)	79 days	Gauhati	6 February 2012
H. S. Thangkhiew		3 November 2019 (Transfer of CJ A. K. Mittal to Madhya Pradesh)	12 November 2019 (Appointment of Mohammad Rafiq as new CJ)	10 days	Meghalaya	19 November 2018
H. S. Thangkhiew		4 November 2021 (Retirement of CJ R. V. More)	23 November 2021 (Transfer of Madras CJ S. Banerjee as new CJ)	20 days	Meghalaya	19 November 2018
H. S. Thangkhiew		2 November 2023 (Retirement of CJ S. Banerjee)	10 February 2024 (Appointment of S. Vaidyanathan as new CJ)	101 days	Meghalaya	19 November 2018
H. S. Thangkhiew		17 August 2024 (Retirement of CJ S. Vaidyanathan)	2 October 2024 (Appointment of I. P. Mukerji as new CJ)	47 days	Meghalaya	19 November 2018
H. S. Thangkhiew		6 September 2025 (Retirement of CJ I. P. Mukerji)	7 October 2025 (Appointment of Soumen Sen as new CJ)	32 days	Meghalaya	19 November 2018

== Orissa High Court ==
The Orissa High Court was established on 3 April 1948 under the Orissa High Court Ordinance, 1948 and the first acting chief justice of the high court was S. B. Burman appointed in 1964.

For Permanent chief justices

Name	Image	From (Reason)	To (Reason)	Tenure	Parent High Court	Date of initial Appointment	Ref.
S. B. Barman		28 December 1964 (Transfer of CJ R. L. Narasimham to Patna)	17 January 1965 (Appointment of Khaleel Ahmed as new CJ)	21 days	Orissa	3 February 1958	
R. N. Misra		6 November 1980 (Retirement of CJ S. K. Ray)	15 January 1981 (Became permanent)	71 days	Orissa	4 July 1969	
Prafulla Kishore Mohanti		14 March 1983 (Elevation of CJ R. N. Misra to SCI)	10 August 1983 (Transfer of Gauhati CJ D. Pathak as new CJ)	150 days	Orissa	2 January 1974	
B. N. Misra		1 March 1986 (Retirement of CJ D. Pathak)	30 April 1986 (Appointment of H. L. Agrawal as new CJ)	61 days	Orissa	5 January 1981	
Radha Charan Pattnaik		1 August 1989 (Retirement of CJ H. L. Agrawal)	21 February 1990 (Appointment of B. L. Hansaria as new CJ)	205 days	Orissa	18 September 1981	
G. T. Nanavati		14 December 1993^{[+]} (Note: Judge of Gujarat High Court transferred as ACJ) (Elevation of CJ B. L. Hansaria to SCI)	30 January 1994 (Became permanent)	48 days	Gujarat	19 July 1979	
G. B. Pattanaik	G. B. Pattanaik	26 April 1995 (Retirement of CJ V. A. Mohta)	18 May 1995^{[§]} (Note: Elevated as Chief Justice of Patna High Court) (Himself elevated as 27th CJ of Patna)	23 days	Orissa	1 June 1983	
Debi Priya Mohapatra		19 May 1995 (Elevation of ACJ G. B. Pattanaik as 27th CJ of Patna)	15 February 1996^{[§]} (Note: Elevated as Chief Justice of Allahabad High Court) (Himself elevated as 35th CJ of Allahabad)	273 days	Orissa	18 November 1983	
Susanta Chatterjee		16 February 1996 (Elevation of ACJ D. P. Mohapatra as 35th CJ of Allahabad)	1 August 1996 (Transfer of HP CJ S. N. Phukan as new CJ)	168 days	Calcutta	17 January 1986	
Susanta Chatterjee		28 January 1999 (Elevation of CJ S. N. Phukan to SCI)	1 April 1999 (Retirement as ACJ)	64 days	Calcutta	17 January 1986	
A. Pasayat		2 April 1999 (Retirement of ACJ S. Chatterjee)	20 September 1999^{[§]} (Note: Elevated as Chief Justice of Kerala High Court) (Himself elevated as 18th CJ of Kerala)	171 days	Orissa	20 March 1989	
R. K. Patra		21 September 1999 (Elevation of ACJ A. Pasayat as 18th CJ of Kerala)	17 November 1999 (Appointment of B. N. Agrawal as new CJ)	58 days	Orissa	22 June 1992	
R. K. Patra		19 October 2000 (Elevation of CJ B. N. Agrawal to SCI)	16 February 2001 (Appointment of N. Y. Hanumanthappa as new CJ)	121 days	Orissa	22 June 1992	
R. K. Patra		25 September 2001 (Retirement of CJ N. Y. Hanumanthappa)	4 December 2001 (Appointment of P. K. Balasubramanyan as new CJ)	71 days	Orissa	22 June 1992	
A. K. Ganguly		28 January 2007 (Retirement of CJ S. B. Roy)	1 March 2007 (Became permanent)	33 days	Calcutta	10 January 1994	
I. M. Quddusi		19 May 2008 (Transfer of CJ A. K. Ganguly to Madras)	15 July 2008 (Appointment of B. S. Chauhan as new CJ)	58 days	Allahabad	18 April 1995	
I. M. Quddusi		11 May 2009 (Elevation of CJ B. S. Chauhan to SCI)	13 November 2009 (Appointment of Bilal Nazki as new CJ)	187 days	Allahabad	18 April 1995	
I. M. Quddusi		18 November 2009 (Retirement of CJ Bilal Nazki)	24 March 2010 (Note: Transferred as Judge to Chhattisgarh High Court) (Appointment of V. G. Gowda as new CJ)	127 days	Allahabad	18 April 1995	
P. K. Mohanty		24 December 2012 (Elevation of CJ V. G. Gowda to SCI)	26 February 2013 (Appointment of C. Nagappan as new CJ)	65 days	Orissa	7 March 2002	
P. K. Mohanty		19 September 2013 (Elevation of CJ C. Nagappan to SCI)	11 October 2013 (Transfer of Gauhati CJ A. K. Goel as new CJ)	23 days	Orissa	7 March 2002	
P. K. Mohanty		7 July 2014 (Elevation of CJ A. K. Goel to SCI)	5 August 2014 (Transfer of Rajasthan CJ Amitava Roy as new CJ)	30 days	Orissa	7 March 2002	
P. K. Mohanty		27 February 2015 (Elevation of CJ Amitava Roy to SCI)	3 June 2015 (Transfer of Karnataka CJ D. H. Waghela as new CJ)	97 days	Orissa	7 March 2002	
P. K. Mohanty		15 February 2016 (Transfer of CJ D. H. Waghela to Bombay)	25 February 2016 (Appointment of Vineet Saran as new CJ)	11 days	Orissa	7 March 2002	
Indrajit Mahanty		7 August 2018 (Elevation of CJ Vineet Saran to SCI)	11 August 2018 (Appointment of K. S. Jhaveri as new CJ)	5 days	Orissa	31 March 2006	
Sanju Panda		5 January 2020 (Retirement of CJ K. S. Jhaveri)	26 April 2020 (Transfer of Meghalaya CJ Mohammad Rafiq as new CJ)	113 days	Orissa	1 March 2007	
B. R. Sarangi		4 October 2023 (Retirement of CJ S. Talapatra)	6 February 2024 (Appointment of C. S. Singh as new CJ)	126 days	Orissa	20 June 2013	
Arindam Sinha		20 January 2025 (Retirement of CJ C. S. Singh)	25 March 2025 (Appointment of Harish Tandon as new CJ)	65 days	Calcutta	30 October 2013	

== Patna High Court ==
The Patna High Court was established on 2 September 1916 under Letters Patent issued by the British Crown and the first acting chief justice of the high court was Fazl Ali appointed in 1938. Website of Bihar State Legal Services Authority contains list of its former patron in chiefs who always had been the chief justice of Patna High Court (whether acting or permanent). Thus the list contained in this website would serve as primary reference for acting chief justices after 1999.

For Permanent chief justices

Name	Image	From (Reason)	To (Reason)	Tenure	Parent High Court	Date of initial Appointment	Ref.
Fazl Ali		7 May 1938 (Resignation of CJ Courtney Terrell)	9 October 1938 (Appointment of A. T. Harries as new CJ)	156 days	Patna	11 April 1928	
C. M. Agarwala		15 October 1946 (Retirement of CJ Fazl Ali)	8 January 1948 (Became permanent)	1 year, 86 days	Patna	July 1932	
Satish Chandra Mishra		3 August 1968 (Retirement of CJ R. L. Narasimham)	8 November 1968 (Became permanent)	98 days	Patna	11 December 1952	
K. B. N. Singh		1 May 1976 (Retirement of CJ Shyam Nandan Prasad Singh)	18 July 1976 (Became permanent)	79 days	Patna	15 November 1966	
Syed Sarwar Ali		13 March 1982 (Transfer of CJ K. B. N. Singh to Madras)	28 November 1983 (Transfer of P&H CJ S. S. Sandhawalia as new CJ)	1 year, 261 days	Patna	6 April 1970	
Bhagwati Prasad Jha		28 July 1987 (Retirement of CJ S. S. Sandhawalia)	1 January 1988 (Became permanent)	158 days	Patna	12 April 1973	
S. K. Jha		3 January 1988 (Retirement of CJ B. P. Jha)	30 April 1988 (Appointment of D. K. Sen as new CJ)	119 days	Patna	12 April 1973	
S. K. Jha		2 May 1989 (Retirement of CJ D. K. Sen)	18 October 1989 (Became permanent)	170 days	Patna	12 April 1973	
N. P. Singh		18 December 1990 (Retirement of CJ G. G. Sohani)	3 February 1991^{[§]} (Note: Elevated as Chief Justice of Calcutta High Court) (Himself elevated as 26th CJ of Calcutta)	48 days	Patna	12 April 1973	
B. L. Yadav		6 March 1995 (Elevation of CJ K. Venkataswamy to SCI)	18 May 1995 (Appointment of G. B. Pattanaik as new CJ)	74 days	Allahabad	24 May 1984	
J. N. Dubey		21 March 1997 (Elevation of CJ Devinder Pratap Wadhwa to SCI)	8 July 1997 (Appointment of B. M. Lal as new CJ)	110 days	Allahabad	24 May 1984	
B. N. Agrawal		7 October 1999 (Retirement of CJ B. M. Lal)	17 November 1999^{[§]} (Note: Elevated as Chief Justice of Orissa High Court) (Himself elevated as 17th CJ of Orissa)	42 days	Patna	17 November 1986	
B. P. Singh		18 November 1999 (Elevation of ACJ B. N. Agrawal as 17th CJ of Orissa)	24 January 2000 (Appointment of R. S. Dhavan as new CJ)	68 days	Patna	9 March 1987	
Nagendra Rai		22 July 2004 (Retirement of CJ R. S. Dhavan)	17 July 2005 (Appointment of J. N. Bhatt as new CJ)	361 days	Patna	10 July 1990	
Narayan Roy		16 October 2007 (Retirement of CJ J. N. Bhatt)	4 January 2008^{[§]} (Note: Elevated as Chief Justice of Rajasthan High Court) (Appointment of Rajesh Balia as new CJ)	81 days	Patna	2 December 1991	
C. K. Prasad		4 March 2008 (Retirement of CJ Rajesh Balia)	12 May 2008 (Appointment of R. M. Lodha as new CJ)	70 days	Patna	8 November 1994	
C. K. Prasad		17 December 2008 (Elevation of CJ R. M. Lodha to SCI)	15 March 2009^{[§]} (Note: Elevated as Chief Justice of Allahabad High Court) (Appointment of J. B. Koshy as new CJ)	89 days	Patna	8 November 1994	
S. K. Singh		13 May 2009 (Retirement of CJ J. B. Koshy)	11 August 2009 (Appointment of P. K. Mishra as new CJ)	91 days	Patna	29 December 1998	
S. K. Singh		17 September 2009 (Retirement of CJ P. K. Mishra)	22 December 2009 (Appointment of Dipak Misra as new CJ)	97 days	Patna	29 December 1998	
S. K. Singh		24 May 2010 (Transfer of CJ Dipak Misra to Delhi)	20 June 2010 (Appointment of R. M. Doshit as new CJ)	28 days	Patna	29 December 1998	
I. A. Ansari		13 December 2014 (Retirement of CJ R. M. Doshit)	1 January 2015 (Appointment of L. N. Reddy as new CJ)	20 days	Gauhati	4 March 2002	
I. A. Ansari		1 August 2015 (Retirement of CJ L. N. Reddy)	28 July 2016 (Became permanent)	363 days	Gauhati	4 March 2002	
Hemant Gupta		29 October 2016 (Retirement of CJ I. A. Ansari)	14 March 2017^{[§]} (Note: Elevated as Chief Justice of Madhya Pradesh High Court) (Appointment of Rajendra Menon as new CJ)	137 days	Punjab & Haryana	2 July 2002	
Ravi Ranjan		9 August 2018 (Transfer of CJ Rajendra Menon to Delhi)	11 August 2018 (Appointment of M. R. Shah as new CJ)	3 days	Patna	14 July 2008	
Ravi Ranjan		2 November 2018 (Elevation of CJ M. R. Shah to SCI)	16 November 2018 (Appointment of A. P. Sahi as new CJ)	15 days	Patna	14 July 2008	
C. S. Singh		6 February 2023 (Elevation of CJ Sanjay Karol to SCI)	28 March 2023 (Appointment of K. V. Chandran as new CJ)	51 days	Patna	5 April 2012	
Ashutosh Kumar		16 January 2025 (Elevation of CJ K. V. Chandran to SCI)	20 July 2025^{[§]} (Note: Elevated as Chief Justice of Gauhati High Court) (Appointment of V. M. Pancholi as new CJ)	186 days	Patna	15 May 2014	
P. B. Bajanthri		29 August 2025 (Elevation of CJ V. M. Pancholi to SCI)	20 September 2025 (Became permanent)	23 days	Karnataka	2 January 2015	
Sudhir Singh		23 October 2025 (Retirement of CJ P. B. Bajanthri)	6 January 2026 (Appointment of S. K. Sahoo as new CJ)	76 days	Patna	15 April 2015	
Sudhir Singh		12 July 2026 (Retirement of CJ M. M. Rai)	12 September 2026 (Appointment of V. K. Rao as new CJ)	63 days	Patna	15 April 2015	

== Punjab and Haryana High Court ==
The Punjab and Haryana High Court was established on 15 August 1947 under the Punjab High Court Ordinance, 1947 and the first acting chief justice of the high court was Prem Chand Jain appointed in 1983. Official website of Punjab and Haryana High Court maintains list of all acting chief justices alongside permanent chief justices

For Permanent chief justices

Name	Image	From (Reason)	To (Reason)	Tenure	Parent High Court	Date of initial Appointment
Prem Chand Jain		28 November 1983 (Transfer of CJ S. S. Sandhawalia to Patna)	31 July 1985 (Became permanent)	1 year, 246 days	Punjab & Haryana	24 June 1968
R. N. Mittal		30 October 1987 (Transfer of CJ D. S. Tewatia to Calcutta)	11 November 1987 (Appointment of V. Ramaswami as new CJ)	13 days	Punjab & Haryana	24 February 1972
Shanti Sarup Dewan		6 October 1989 (Elevation of CJ V. Ramaswami to SCI)	23 October 1989 (Became permanent)	18 days	Punjab & Haryana	6 March 1974
Jitendra Vir Gupta		1 January 1990 (Retirement of CJ S. S. Dewan)	8 July 1990 (Became permanent)	189 days	Punjab & Haryana	19 February 1979
Gokal Chand Mittal		2 May 1991 (Resignation of CJ J. V. Gupta)	4 August 1991^{[§]} (Note: Elevated as Chief Justice of Delhi High Court) (Himself elevated as 16th CJ of Delhi)	95 days	Punjab & Haryana	19 February 1979
Iqbal Singh Tiwana		5 August 1991 (Elevation of ACJ G. C. Mittal as 16th CJ of Delhi)	19 September 1991 (Appointment of Bipin Chandra Verma as new CJ)	46 days	Punjab & Haryana	11 June 1979
Sarvinder Singh Sodhi		1 September 1992 (Resignation of CJ M. R. Jois)	12 November 1992 (Appointment of Sudarshan Dayal Aggarwal as new CJ)	73 days	Punjab & Haryana	18 June 1982
R. P. Sethi		27 March 1996 (Elevation of CJ S. P. Kurdukar to SCI)	27 June 1996^{[§]} (Note: Elevated as Chief Justice of Karnataka High Court) (Himself elevated as 18th CJ of Karnataka)	93 days	Jammu & Kashmir	30 May 1986
M. S. Liberhan		27 June 1996 (Elevation of ACJ R. P. Sethi as 18th CJ of Karnataka)	30 July 1996 (Appointment of Kumaran Sreedharan as new CJ)	34 days	Punjab & Haryana	11 February 1987
Amarjeet Chaudhary		19 October 1997 (Transfer of CJ Kumaran Sreedharan to Gujarat)	7 November 1997 (Appointment of Arun B. Saharya as new CJ)	20 days	Punjab & Haryana	27 June 1988
G. S. Singhvi		15 September 2002 (Retirement of CJ Arun B. Saharya)	14 October 2002 (Appointment of B. K. Roy as new CJ)	30 days	Rajasthan	20 July 1990
G. S. Singhvi		21 February 2005 (Transfer of CJ B. K. Roy to Gauhati)	25 February 2005 (Himself transferred as Judge to Gujarat)	5 days	Rajasthan	20 July 1990
H. S. Bedi		26 February 2005 (Transfer of ACJ G. S. Singhvi as Judge to Gujarat)	11 March 2005 (Appointment of D. K. Jain as new CJ)	14 days	Punjab & Haryana	15 March 1991
H. S. Bedi		10 April 2006 (Elevation of CJ D. K. Jain to SCI)	2 October 2006^{[§]} (Note: Elevated as Chief Justice of Bombay High Court) (Himself elevated as 36th CJ of Bombay)	176 days	Punjab & Haryana	15 March 1991
S. S. Nijjar		3 October 2006 (Elevation of ACJ H. S. Bedi as 36th CJ of Bombay)	28 November 2006 (Appointment of Vijender Jain as new CJ)	57 days	Punjab & Haryana	8 April 1996
J. S. Khehar	J. S. Khehar	2 August 2008 (Retirement of CJ Vijender Jain)	10 August 2008 (Appointment of T. S. Thakur as new CJ)	9 days	Punjab & Haryana	8 February 1999
J. S. Khehar	J. S. Khehar	17 November 2009 (Elevation of CJ T. S. Thakur to SCI)	28 November 2009^{[§]} (Note: Elevated as Chief Justice of Uttarakhand High Court) (Himself elevated as 7th CJ of Uttarakhand)	12 days	Punjab & Haryana	8 February 1999
Mehtab Singh Gill		29 November 2009 (Elevation of ACJ J. S. Khehar as 7th CJ of Uttarakhand)	5 December 2009 (Appointment of Mukul Mudgal as new CJ)	7 days	Punjab & Haryana	14 May 1999
Ranjan Gogoi	Ranjan Gogoi	4 January 2011 (Retirement of CJ Mukul Mudgal)	11 February 2011 (Became permanent)	39 days	Gauhati	28 February 2001
M. M. Kumar		23 April 2012 (Elevation of CJ Ranjan Gogoi to SCI)	8 June 2012^{[§]} (Note: Elevated as Chief Justice of Jammu & Kashmir High Court) (Himself elevated as 30th CJ of J&K)	47 days	Punjab & Haryana	2 July 2001
Jasbir Singh		9 June 2012 (Elevation of ACJ M. M. Kumar as 30th CJ of J&K)	23 September 2012 (Appointment of A. K. Sikri as new CJ)	107 days	Punjab & Haryana	2 July 2001
Jasbir Singh		12 April 2013 (Elevation of CJ A. K. Sikri to SCI)	31 May 2013 (Appointment of S. K. Kaul as new CJ)	50 days	Punjab & Haryana	2 July 2001
Ashutosh Mohunta		26 July 2014 (Transfer of CJ S. K. Kaul to Madras)	15 December 2014 (Transfer of S. J. Vazifdar as ACJ)	143 days	Punjab & Haryana	2 July 2001
S. J. Vazifdar		15 December 2014^{[+]} (Transferred as ACJ)	6 August 2016 (Became permanent)	1 year, 236 days	Bombay	22 January 2001
A. K. Mittal		4 May 2018 (Retirement of CJ S. J. Vazifdar)	2 June 2018 (Appointment of Krishna Murari as new CJ)	30 days	Punjab & Haryana	9 January 2004
Rajeev Sharma		23 September 2019 (Elevation of CJ Krishna Murari to SCI)	5 October 2019 (Appointment of R. S. Jha as new CJ)	13 days	Himachal Pradesh	3 April 2007
Ritu Bahri		14 October 2023 (Retirement of CJ R. S. Jha)	3 February 2024^{[§]} (Herself elevated as 13th CJ of Uttarakhand)	112 days	Punjab & Haryana	16 August 2010
G. S. Sandhawalia		4 February 2024 (Elevation of ACJ Ritu Bahri as 13th CJ of Uttarakhand)	8 July 2024 (Appointment of Sheel Nagu as new CJ)	156 days	Punjab & Haryana	30 September 2011
A. K. Mishra		2 June 2026 (Elevation of CJ Sheel Nagu to SCI)	6 September 2026 (Became permanent)	97 days	Allahabad	3 February 2014

== Rajasthan High Court ==
The Rajasthan High Court was established on 21 June 1949 under the Rajasthan High Court Ordinance, 1949 and the first acting chief justice of the high court was Nawal Kishore appointed in 1950. Website of Rajasthan State Legal Services Authority contains list of its former patron in chiefs who always had been the chief justice of Rajasthan High Court (whether acting or permanent). Thus the list contained in this website would serve as primary reference for acting chief justices after 1997.

For Permanent chief justices

Name	Image	From (Reason)	To (Reason)	Tenure	Parent High Court	Date of initial Appointment
Nawal Kishore		25 January 1950 (Retirement of CJ K. K. Verma)	1 January 1951 (Appointment of K. N. Wanchoo as new CJ)	342 days	Rajasthan	29 August 1949
Kanwar Lal Bapna		11 August 1958 (Elevation of CJ K. N. Wanchoo to SCI)	27 February 1959 (Transfer of Gauhati CJ Sarjoo Prasad as new CJ)	201 days	Rajasthan	29 August 1949
A. P. Sen		28 December 1977 (Retirement of CJ V. P. Tyagi)	28 February 1978^{[§]} (Note: Elevated as Chief Justice of Madhya Pradesh High Court) (Himself elevated as 7th CJ of MP)	63 days	Madhya Pradesh	7 November 1967
Mohan Lal Joshi		1 March 1978 (Elevation of ACJ A. P. Sen as 7th CJ of MP)	26 April 1978 (Appointment of C. Honniah as new CJ)	57 days	Rajasthan	22 November 1971
Mohan Lal Joshi		23 September 1978 (Retirement of CJ C. Honniah)	11 March 1979 (Transfer of Gauhati CJ C. M. Lodha as new CJ)	170 days	Rajasthan	22 November 1971
Kalyan Dutt Sharma		10 July 1980 (Retirement of CJ C. M. Lodha)	6 January 1981 (Became permanent)	181 days	Rajasthan	20 July 1973
Dwarka Prasad Gupta		1 October 1985 (Retirement of CJ Pradyot Kumar Banerjee)	11 April 1986 (Became permanent)	193 days	Rajasthan	24 September 1973
G. M. Lodha		1 August 1986 (Retirement of CJ D. P. Gupta)	31 August 1986 (Transfer of MP CJ J. S. Verma as new CJ)	31 days	Rajasthan	1 May 1978
M. C. Jain		23 May 1989 (Elevation of CJ J. S. Verma to SCI)	14 April 1990 (Appointment of K. C. Agarwal as new CJ)	327 days	Rajasthan	15 June 1978
Maheshwari Prasad Singh		25 December 1997 (Retirement of CJ M. G. Mukherjee)	9 April 1998 (Retirement as ACJ)	107 days	Allahabad	31 July 1987
N. L. Tibrewal		10 April 1998 (Retirement of ACJ M. P. Singh)	25 May 1998 (Himself appointed as Acting Governor of Rajasthan)	46 days	Rajasthan	20 July 1990
N. L. Tibrewal		16 January 1999 (Reverted from position of Acting Governor to ACJ)	17 January 1999 (Retirement as ACJ)	2 days	Rajasthan	20 July 1990
V. S. Kokje		25 May 1998 (Appointment of ACJ N. L. Tibrewal as Acting Governor of Rajasthan)	15 January 1999 (Acting Governor N. L.Tibrewal reverted to his position as ACJ)	236 days	Madhya Pradesh	28 July 1990
V. S. Kokje		17 January 1999 (Retirement of ACJ N. L. Tibrewal)	21 January 1999 (Appointment of S. V. Patil as new CJ)	5 days	Madhya Pradesh	28 July 1990
V. S. Kokje		15 March 2000 (Elevation of CJ S. V. Patil to SCI)	28 May 2000 (Appointment of A. R. Lakshmanan as new CJ)	75 days	Madhya Pradesh	28 July 1990
Megh Raj Calla		26 November 2001 (Transfer of CJ A. R. Lakshmanan to Undivided AP)	1 December 2001 (Appointment of Arun Kumar as new CJ)	6 days	Rajasthan	20 July 1990
Megh Raj Calla		3 October 2002 (Elevation of CJ Arun Kumar to SCI)	23 December 2002 (Appointment of Anil Dev Singh as new CJ)	82 days	Rajasthan	20 July 1990
Y. R. Meena		23 October 2004 (Retirement of CJ Anil Dev Singh)	11 October 2005 (Transfer of J&K CJ Sachchidanand Jha as new CJ)	354 days	Rajasthan	20 July 1990
Rajesh Balia		16 June 2007 (Retirement of CJ Sachchidanand Jha)	15 July 2007 (Transfer of J. M. Panchal as ACJ)	30 days	Rajasthan	21 October 1991
Rajesh Balia		12 November 2007 (Elevation of CJ J. M. Panchal to SCI)	4 January 2008^{[§]} (Note: Elevated as Chief Justice of Patna High Court) (Appointment of Narayan Roy as new CJ)	54 days	Rajasthan	21 October 1991
Jagdish Madhurlal Panchal		16 July 2007^{[+]} (Transferred as ACJ)	15 September 2007 (Became permanent)	62 days	Gujarat	22 November 1990
Rattan Chand Gandhi		1 February 2009 (Retirement of CJ Narayan Roy)	5 March 2009 (Appointment of Deepak Verma as new CJ)	33 days	Jammu & Kashmir	6 January 1995
Rattan Chand Gandhi		11 May 2009 (Elevation of CJ Deepak Verma to SCI)	9 August 2009 (Transfer of HP CJ Jagadish Bhalla as new CJ)	91 days	Jammu & Kashmir	6 January 1995
Arun Mishra		1 November 2010 (Retirement of CJ Jagadish Bhalla)	25 November 2010 (Became permanent)	25 days	Madhya Pradesh	25 October 1999
Narendra Kumar Jain		14 December 2012 (Transfer of CJ Arun Mishra to Calcutta)	2 January 2013 (Appointment of Amitava Roy as new CJ)	20 days	Rajasthan	2 September 2004
Sunil Ambwani		6 August 2014 (Transfer of CJ Amitava Roy to Orissa)	23 March 2015 (Became permanent)	230 days	Allahabad	24 April 2001
Ajit Singh		23 August 2015 (Retirement of CJ Sunil Ambwani)	4 March 2016^{[§]} (Note: Elevated as Chief Justice of Gauhati High Court) (Appointment of Satish Kumar Mittal as new CJ)	196 days	Madhya Pradesh	1 April 2002
Ajay Rastogi		15 April 2016 (Retirement of CJ Satish Kumar Mittal)	13 May 2016 (Transfer of Chhattisgarh CJ Navin Sinha as new CJ)	29 days	Rajasthan	2 September 2004
K. S. Jhaveri		17 February 2017 (Elevation of CJ Navin Sinha to SCI)	1 April 2017 (Appointment of Pradeep Nandrajog as new CJ)	44 days	Gujarat	7 March 2004
Mohammad Rafiq		7 April 2019 (Transfer of CJ Pradeep Nandrajog to Bombay)	4 May 2019 (Appointment of S. R. Bhat as new CJ)	28 days	Rajasthan	15 May 2006
Mohammad Rafiq		23 September 2019 (Elevation of CJ S. R. Bhat to SCI)	5 October 2019 (Appointment of I. Mahanty as new CJ)	13 days	Rajasthan	15 May 2006
M. M. Shrivastava		7 March 2022 (Retirement of CJ A. A. Kureshi)	20 June 2022 (Appointment of S. S. Shinde as new CJ)	106 days	Chhattisgarh	10 December 2009
M. M. Shrivastava		2 August 2022 (Retirement of CJ S. S. Shinde)	13 October 2022 (Transfer of J&K CJ Pankaj Mithal as new CJ)	47 days	Chhattisgarh	10 December 2009
M. M. Shrivastava		6 February 2023 (Elevation of CJ Pankaj Mithal to SCI)	29 May 2023 (Appointment of A. G. Masih as new CJ)	113 days	Chhattisgarh	10 December 2009
M. M. Shrivastava		9 November 2023 (Elevation of CJ A. G. Masih to SCI)	5 February 2024 (Became permanent)	89 days	Chhattisgarh	10 December 2009
S. P. Sharma		28 September 2025 (Retirement of CJ K. R. Shriram)	6 September 2026 (Appointment of S. K. Agrawal as new CJ)	344 days	Rajasthan	16 November 2016

== Sikkim High Court ==
The Sikkim High Court was established on 16 May 1975 under the 36th Amendment to the Indian Constitution with Rajinder Sachar as its inaugural acting chief justice.

For Permanent chief justices

Name	Image	From (Reason)	To (Reason)	Tenure	Parent High Court	Date of initial Appointment
Rajinder Sachar		16 May 1975 (Creation of New HC)	6 May 1976 (Note: Transferred as Judge to Rajasthan High Court) (Appointment of M. S. Gujral as new CJ)	357 days	Delhi	12 February 1970
A. M. Bhattacharjee		14 March 1983 (Retirement of CJ M. S. Gujral)	16 December 1983 (Appointment of M. L. Shrimal as new CJ)	278 days	Sikkim	16 June 1976
A. M. Bhattacharjee		4 January 1985 (Retirement of CJ M. L. Shrimal)	20 January 1986 (Appointment of Jugal Kishore Mohanty as new CJ)	1 year, 17 days	Sikkim	16 June 1976
R. S. Dayal		5 January 1989 (Retirement of CJ Jugal Kishore Mohanty)	19 January 1990 (Appointment of B. N. Misra as new CJ)	1 year, 15 days	Sikkim	10 May 1984
R. S. Dayal		9 November 1992 (Retirement of CJ B. N. Misra)	19 January 1993 (Appointment of Surendra Nath Bhargava as new CJ)	72 days	Sikkim	10 May 1984
Malay Sengupta		27 October 1996 (Retirement of CJ Krishna Murari Agarwal)	26 August 1997 (Appointment of K. A. Thanikkachallam as new CJ)	304 days	Calcutta	27 September 1995
Malay Sengupta		27 September 1997 (Retirement of CJ K. A. Thanikkachallam)	26 December 1997 (Transfer of Anup Deb as ACJ)	91 days	Calcutta	27 September 1995
Anup Deb		27 December 1997^{[+]} (Transferred as ACJ)	2 February 1999 (Appointment of R. S. Dayal as new CJ)	1 year, 38 days	Sikkim	16 December 1994
Nongthomban Surajmani Singh		18 May 2003 (Retirement of CJ R. S. Dayal)	8 July 2003 (Appointment of R. K. Patra as new CJ)	52 days	Gauhati	29 January 1996
Nongthomban Surajmani Singh		24 November 2004 (Retirement of CJ R. K. Patra)	29 September 2005 (Transfer of Gauhati CJ B. K. Roy as new CJ)	310 days	Gauhati	29 January 1996
Nongthomban Surajmani Singh		27 December 2006 (Retirement of CJ B. K. Roy)	26 January 2007 (Transfer of Allahabad CJ A. N. Ray as new CJ)	31 days	Gauhati	29 January 1996
Ananda Prakash Subba		31 October 2008 (Retirement of CJ A. N. Ray)	6 March 2009 (Appointment of A. H. Saikia as new CJ)	127 days	Sikkim	4 October 2004
Sonam Phinsto Wangdi		30 July 2011 (Resignation of CJ P. D. Dinakaran)	11 December 2011 (Appointment of Permod Kohli as new CJ)	135 days	Sikkim	23 June 2009
Sonam Phinsto Wangdi		1 March 2013 (Retirement of CJ Permod Kohli)	27 March 2013 (Appointment of P. C. Kuriakose as new CJ)	27 days	Sikkim	23 June 2009
Narendra Kumar Jain		2 October 2013 (Retirement of CJ P. C. Kuriakose)	6 January 2014 (Became permanent)	97 days	Rajasthan	2 September 2004
S. K. Sinha		8 October 2014 (Retirement of CJ N. K. Jain)	29 March 2015 (Became permanent)	173 days	Chhattisgarh	1 December 2004
S. K. Agnihotri		7 July 2016 (Retirement of CJ S. K. Sinha)	21 September 2016 (Became permanent)	77 days	Chhattisgarh	5 May 2005
M. M. Rai		1 July 2018 (Retirement of CJ S. K. Agnihotri)	29 October 2018 (Appointment of V. K. Bist as new CJ)	121 days	Sikkim	15 April 2015
M. M. Rai		17 September 2019 (Retirement of CJ V. K. Bist)	14 October 2019 (Appointment of A. K. Goswami as new CJ)	28 days	Sikkim	15 April 2015
M. M. Rai		1 September 2021 (Elevation of CJ J. K. Maheshwari to SCI)	11 October 2021 (Transfer of Meghalaya CJ Biswanath Somadder as new CJ)	41 days	Sikkim	15 April 2015
M. M. Rai		15 December 2025 (Retirement of CJ Biswanath Somadder)	3 January 2026 (Appointment of A. M. Mustaque as new CJ)	20 days	Sikkim	15 April 2015

== Telangana High Court ==
The Telangana High Court was established on 1 January 2019 under Andhra Pradesh Reorganisation Act, 2014 and the first acting chief justice of the high court was R. S. Chauhan appointed in 2019.

For Permanent chief justices

Name	Image	From (Reason)	To (Reason)	Tenure	Parent High Court	Date of initial Appointment
R. S. Chauhan		3 April 2019 (Transfer of CJ T. B. Radhakrishnan to Calcutta)	21 June 2019 (Became permanent)	80 days	Rajasthan	13 June 2005
M. S. R. Rao		31 August 2021 (Elevation of CJ Hima Kohli to SCI)	10 October 2021 (Note: Transferred as Judge to Punjab and Haryana High Court) (Appointment of S. C. Sharma as new CJ)	41 days	Telangana	29 June 2012
Ponugoti Naveen Rao		14 July 2023 (Appointed due to elevation of CJ Ujjal Bhuyan to SCI and retired on the same day)		1 day	Telangana	12 April 2013
Abhinand Kumar Shavili		15 July 2023 (Retirement of ACJ P. N. Rao)	23 July 2023 (Appointment of Alok Aradhe as new CJ)	9 days	Telangana	21 September 2017
Sujoy Paul		21 January 2025 (Transfer of CJ Alok Aradhe to Bombay)	17 July 2025 (Himself transferred as Judge to Calcutta)	178 days	Madhya Pradesh	27 May 2011
P. S. Koshy		18 July 2025 (Transfer of ACJ Sujoy Paul as Judge to Calcutta)	19 July 2025 (Transfer of Tripura CJ A. K. Singh as new CJ)	2 days	Chhattisgarh	16 September 2013

== Tripura High Court ==
The Tripura High Court was established on 26 March 2013 under the North-Eastern Areas (Reorganisation) and Other Related Laws (Amendment) Act, 2012 and the first acting chief justice of the high court was T. Vaiphei appointed in 2016.

For Permanent chief justices

Name	Image	From (Reason)	To (Reason)	Tenure	Parent High Court	Date of initial Appointment
T. Vaiphei		16 May 2016^{[+]} (Note: Judge of Gauhati High Court transferred as ACJ) (Transfer of CJ Deepak Gupta to Chhattisgarh)	20 September 2016 (Became permanent)	128 days	Gauhati	17 July 2003
Subhasis Talapatra		2 November 2018 (Elevation of CJ Ajay Rastogi to SCI)	13 November 2018 (Appointment of Sanjay Karol as new CJ)	12 days	Tripura	15 November 2011
Subhasis Talapatra		11 November 2019 (Transfer of CJ Sanjay Karol to Patna)	15 November 2019 (Appointment of A. A. Kureshi as new CJ)	5 days	Tripura	15 November 2011
T. A. Goud		11 November 2022 (Retirement of CJ I. Mahanty)	14 February 2023 (Appointment of Jaswant Singh as new CJ)	96 days	Telangana	21 September 2017
T. A. Goud		23 February 2023 (Retirement of CJ Jaswant Singh)	16 April 2023 (Appointment of A. K. Singh as new CJ)	53 days	Telangana	21 September 2017
T. A. Goud		18 July 2025 (Transfer of CJ A. K. Singh to Telangana)	21 July 2025 (Transfer of Jharkhand CJ M. S. R. Rao as new CJ)	4 days	Telangana	21 September 2017

== Uttarakhand High Court ==
The Uttarakhand High Court was established on 9 November 2000 under Uttar Pradesh Reorganisation Act, 2000 with Ashok Desai as its inaugural acting chief justice.

For Permanent chief justices

Name	Image	From (Reason)	To (Reason)	Tenure	Parent High Court	Date of initial Appointment
Ashok Desai		9 November 2000 (Creation of New HC)	5 December 2000 (Became permanent)	27 days	Bombay	21 November 1986
Prakash Chandra Verma		1 April 2003 (Resignation of CJ Ashok Desai)	4 August 2003 (Appointment of S. H. Kapadia as new CJ)	126 days	Allahabad	5 February 1999
Prakash Chandra Verma		18 December 2003 (Elevation of CJ S. H. Kapadia to SCI)	24 July 2004 (Appointment of V. S. Sirpurkar as new CJ)	220 days	Allahabad	5 February 1999
Prakash Chandra Verma		7 January 2006 (Transfer of CJ Cyriac Joseph to Karnataka)	13 January 2006 (Transfer of Kerala CJ Rajeev Gupta as new CJ)	7 days	Allahabad	5 February 1999
B. C. Kandapal		10 September 2009 (Retirement of CJ V. K. Gupta)	25 September 2009 (Transfer of Tarun Agarwala as ACJ)	16 days	Uttarakhand	29 June 2004
Tarun Agarwala		25 September 2009^{[+]} (Transferred as ACJ)	28 November 2009 (Appointment of J. S. Khehar as new CJ)	65 days	Allahabad	7 January 2004
V. K. Bist		5 June 2014 (Retirement of CJ Barin Ghosh)	30 July 2014 (Appointment of K. M. Joseph as new CJ)	56 days	Uttarakhand	1 November 2008
Rajeev Sharma		7 August 2018 (Elevation of CJ K. M. Joseph to SCI)	2 November 2018 (Appointment of R. Ranganathan as new CJ)	87 days	Himachal Pradesh	3 April 2007
Ravi Malimath		28 July 2020 (Retirement of CJ R. Ranganathan)	6 January 2021 (Note: Transferred as Judge to Himachal Pradesh High Court) (Transfer of Telangana CJ R. S. Chauhan as new CJ)	132 days	Karnataka	18 February 2008
S. K. Mishra		24 December 2021 (Retirement of CJ R. S. Chauhan)	28 June 2022 (Appointment of Vipin Sanghi as new CJ)	187 days	Orissa	7 October 2009
M. K. Tiwari		27 October 2023 (Retirement of CJ Vipin Sanghi)	3 February 2024 (Appointment of Ritu Bahri as new CJ)	100 days	Uttarakhand	19 May 2017
M. K. Tiwari		11 October 2024 (Retirement of CJ Ritu Bahri)	25 December 2024 (Appointment of G. Narendar as new CJ)	76 days	Uttarakhand	19 May 2017

== See also ==
- List of former chief justices of the high courts of India
- List of current Indian chief justices
- List of sitting judges of the high courts of India
- List of former judges of the Supreme Court of India
- List of sitting judges of the Supreme Court of India
- List of chief justices of India
- List of presidents of India
