= Ram Prakash Sethi =

Indian judge (1937–2007)

Judge of the Supreme Court of India
- In office 8 January 1999 – 7 July 2002

Chief Justice of Karnataka High Court
- In office 29 June 1996 – 6 January 1999
- Succeeded by: Y. Bhaskar Rao

Personal details
- Born: 7 July 1937 7 July 1937
- Died: 17 January 2007 (aged 69) Chandigarh, India
- Education: Kashmir University; Aligarh Muslim University

Ram Prakash Sethi (7 July 1937 – 17 January 2007) was an Indian judge who served on the Supreme Court of India. He began practicing law in 1961. Sethi was enrolled as Pleader in 1961, as Vakil in 1962, and as advocate in 1967. He practiced law for 25 years. Before elevation to the Jammu & Kashmir High Court on 30 May 1986, he was Special Public Prosecutor for cases under Jammu & Kashmir Enemy Agents Ordinance, appointed Additional Advocate General of Jammu & Kashmir State in 1975 but resigned after nine months. Was the Standing Counsel of various prestigious organizations and institutions such as the University of Jammu, Jammu & Kashmir Financial Corporation, represented State of Jammu & Kashmir in the Supreme Court in the review matter of Keshwanand Bharti's case.

He died on 17 January 2007 at Chandigarh.

== Early life ==
Sethi was born in Mirpur, Jammu and Kashmir (present-day Pakistan).

== Education ==
Sethi graduated from University of Kashmir in 1959 and LL.B. from Faculty of Law, Aligarh Muslim University, Aligarh in 1961. He was President of the Students Union of the College. Actively participated in the students movement having remained as Secretary General of Jammu and Kashmir Students Federation of India. He was also Secretary of the Debating Society of the College, participated in various debates at the State and national level and won prizes. He also edited the college magazine.

== Career ==
Sethi authored commentaries on the Hindu Marriage Act and was an editor of Urdu weekly Shagaf besides being the Regional Editor of more than twelve law magazines published from various parts of the country.

He was appointed additional judge of the Jammu and Kashmir High Court on 30 May 1986 and a permanent Judge on 5 August 1987. He transferred to Punjab & Haryana High Court on 18 October 1993 and was appointed Chief Justice Karnataka High Court on 29 June 1996. Later, he was appointed as a Judge of Supreme Court of India on 8 January 1999. Sethi retired on 7 July 2002.

Post-retirement, he was appointed to the Jammu & Kashmir accountability panel.
