= Antony Dominic =

34th Chief Justice of Kerala

Hon'ble Justice Antony Dominic
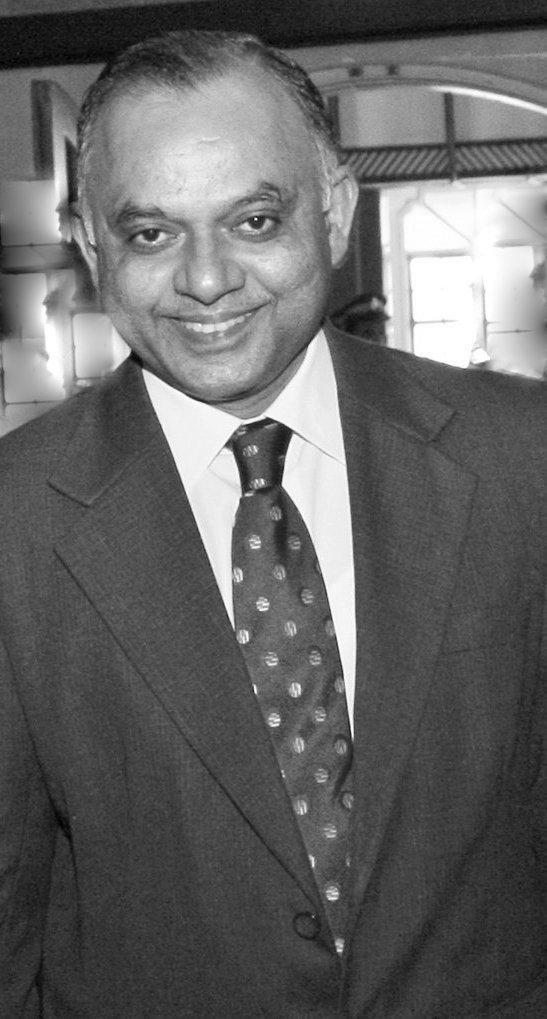

Chief Justice of Kerala
- In office 6 February 2018 – 30 May 2018
- Preceded by: Justice Navniti Prasad Singh
- Succeeded by: Justice Hrishikesh Roy

Judge Kerala High Court
- In office 30 January 2007 – 5 February 2018

Personal details
- Born: 30 May 1956 (age 70) Kerala, India
- Education: S.D.M Law College, Mangalore

Justice Antony Dominic (born 30 May 1956) is a retired Indian judge and former Chief Justice at the High Court of Kerala. The High Court, headquartered at Ernakulam, is the highest court in the Indian state of Kerala and in the Union Territory of Lakshadweep. He was the Chairman of the State Human Rights Commission of Kerala.

== Education ==
Dominic obtained his degree in law from S.D.M. Law College, Mangalore.

== Career ==
He started his practice in Munsiff's Court and JFCM, Kanjirappally in 1981. Later, Dominic shifted to Kerala High Court at Ernakulam in 1986. He acquired extensive experience in Company, Labour and Constitutional laws. Dominic was appointed Additional Judge of the Kerala High Court in January 2007 and promoted to Permanent Judge in December 2008.

He was elevated to the post of Chief Justice, High Court of Kerala on 6 February 2018, and his tenure ended on 29 May 2018.

Currently, he is the Chairman of the State Human Rights Commission of Kerala.
