= Jyotirmay Bhattacharya =

Indian judge

The Hon'ble Justice Jyotirmay Bhattacharya

Acting Chief Justice of the Calcutta High Court
- In office 25 October 2017 – 24 September 2018
- Appointed by: Ram Nath Kovind (President of India)
- Preceded by: Rakesh Tiwari (acting)

Judge, Calcutta High Court
- In office 3 December 2003 – 24 September 2018
- Appointed by: A. P. J. Abdul Kalam

Personal details
- Born: 25 September 1956 (age 70)
- Education: St. Xavier's College, Kolkata; Faculty of Law, University of Calcutta

Justice Jyotirmay Bhattacharya (born 25 September 1956) is a retired Indian jurist who served as the acting Chief Justice at the Calcutta High Court from October 2017 to April 2018 and was Chief Justice of the same high court from 1 May 2018 to September 2018.

== Education ==
Bhattacharya was born in the Village Beliachandi of South 24 Parganas, where he was educated at Baruipur High School. Afterward, he went to St. Xavier's College, Calcutta and got his LL. B. degree from the University of Calcutta.

== Career ==
Bhattacharya enrolled at the Bar in March 1983. He started practising in the Civil and Writ Jurisdictions of the Calcutta High Court. In 2003, he was appointed a Permanent Judge at the court.

== Notable judgements ==
- A High Court bench presided by Bhattacharya held in September 2012 that land acquisition along certain stretches of Kolkata Metro stood lapsed on account of compensation not being awarded to the tenants within the stipulated period. This was in response to a writ petition filed by Central Calcutta Citizens' Welfare Association.
