= Rakesh Tiwari =

Indian judge

Rakesh Tiwari (born 25 October 1955) is a retired Indian judge and former acting Chief Justice of the Calcutta High Court.

== Career ==
Tiwari graduated in Commerce subject and passed LL.B. from Allahabad University in Allahabad. He got the enrollment on 20 July 1984 from the Bar Council of Uttar Pradesh. He started practice in the Allahabad High Court on the Civil matters as well as Labour Industry, Company and Constitutional law. Tiwari also worked as advocate of Central Government Undertaking Corporations, Banks, Local Bodies and Premier Companies. He was first elevated as permanent Judge on 14 February 2002. In March 2016, Justice Tiwari was transferred to the Calcutta High Court. After the retirement of Smt. Nishita Nirmal Mhatre he took charge of the Chief Justice on 20 September 2017. He retired from the judgeship in October 2017.
