= Kudarikoti Annadanayya Swamy =

Indian judge (1935–2023)

Kudarikoti Annadanayya Swami (20 March 1935 – 14 February 2023) was an Indian judge who served as Chief Justice of Madras High Court from 1993 to 1997 and also was Judge of Karnataka High Court.

== Personal life and career ==
Swami was born on 20 March 1935. He was appointed to Judge of Karnataka High Court in 1980 and also was Acting Chief Justice of Karnataka High Court from 1992 to 1993 and then became Chief Justice of Madras High Court on 1 July 1993. Justice K A Swami died on 14 February 2023, at the age of 87.
