= Kumar Rajarathnam =

Indian Judge

17th Chief Justice of the Madhya Pradesh High Court
- In office 6 September 2003 – 12 March 2004

Judge of the Karnataka High Court
- In office 24 January 1994 – 5 September 2003

Judge of the Madras High Court
- In office 1 January 1994 – 23 January 1994

Personal details
- Born: 13 March 1942 India
- Died: 27 September 2015 (aged 73)

Kumar Rajarathnam (13 March 1942 – 27 September 2015) was an Indian Barrister and former Chief Justice of the Madhya Pradesh High Court. He became the first barrister since the Independence of India to be appointed a judge.

== Career ==
Rajarathnam studied at Loyola College, Chennai and was called to the Bar from Gray's lnn. He was enrolled as an advocate on 10 March 1971 and started his lawyer career in the Madras High Court. On 1 January 1994 he was appointed a judge of Madras High Court. Justice Rajarathnam was transferred to the Karnataka High Court on 24 January 1994. He was elevated to the post of Chief Justice of the Madhya Pradesh High Court in September 2003. Rajarathnam retired in 2004 and became the second Chairman of the Securities Appellate Tribunal in Mumbai from 20 March 2004 to 20 December 2005. In 2015, he died in Chennai at the age of 73.
