= Pius C. Kuriakose =

Hon'ble Justice Pius C. Kuriakose

Lokayukta, Kerala
- In office 10 February 2014 – 10 February 2019

Chief Justice Sikkim High Court
- In office 28 March 2013 – 1 October 2013

Judge Kerala High Court
- In office 9 September 2002 – 27 March 2013

Personal details
- Born: 2 October 1951 (age 75) Thripunithura, Kerala, India
- Citizenship: Indian
- Education: Government Law College, Ernakulam

Pius C. Kuriakose (born 2 October 1951) is a former Lokayukta of the state of Kerala and a retired Chief Justice of Sikkim High Court.

== Early life ==
He was born in Thripunithura, Ernakulam District, Kerala, India on 2 October 1951. He completed his education from St. Mary's Lower Primary School, Thripunithura, Leo XIII English Medium High School, Alappuzaha, Government Boys' High School, Thripunithura, Maharajas College, Ernakulam and Maharajas Law College, Ernakulam.

== Career ==
He enrolled as an Advocate on 9 November 1974 and was practicing in Ernakulam in civil, rent control, land acquisition, constitutional and criminal matters. He was appointed Additional Judge in Kerala High Court on 9 September 2002 and he became designated as the Permanent Judge of Kerala High Court on 8 September 2004.
