= Nirendra Krishna Mitra =

Indian Judge

36th Chief Justice of Allahabad High Court
- In office 12 February 1999 – 17 April 2000
- Preceded by: Deba Priya Mohapatra
- Succeeded by: Shyamal Kumar Sen

Judge of the Calcutta High Court
- In office 20 December 1985 – February 1999

Personal details
- Profession: Judge

Nirendra Krishna Mitra (18 April 1938 —12 April 2003) was an Indian Judge and former Chief Justice of the Allahabad High Court.

== Career ==
Mitra passed M.A, LL.B and started his career as an advocate in 1963 in the Calcutta High Court. He was later elevated as a permanent judge of the Calcutta High Court on 20 December 1985. On 12 February 1999, he was appointed Chief Justice of the Allahabad High Court.
