= Ajai Lamba =

Former Chief Justice of Gauhati High Court

Hon'ble Chief Justice Retd. Ajai Lamba

Chief Justice of Gauhati High Court
- In office 7 October 2019 – 20 September 2020
- Nominated by: Ranjan Gogoi
- Appointed by: Ram Nath Kovind

Judge of Allahabad High Court
- In office 9 December 2011 – 4 October 2019
- Nominated by: S. H. Kapadia
- Appointed by: Pratibha Patil

Judge of Punjab and Haryana High Court
- In office 22 March 2006 – 8 December 2011
- Nominated by: Yogesh Kumar Sabharwal
- Appointed by: A. P. J. Abdul Kalam

Personal details
- Born: 21 September 1958 (age 68) Abohar, Punjab
- Education: Panjab University

Justice Ajai Lamba (born 21 September 1958) is an Indian Judge. He is former Chief Justice of Gauhati High Court and Judge of Allahabad High Court and Punjab and Haryana High Court.
