= T. Raja (judge) =

Former Acting Chief Justice of Madras High Court

Hon'ble Acting Chief Justice (Retd.) T. Raja

Acting Chief Justice of Madras High Court
- In office 22 September 2022 – 24 May 2023
- Appointed by: Droupadi Murmu

Judge of Madras High Court
- In office 31 March 2009 – 21 September 2022
- Nominated by: K. G. Balakrishnan
- Appointed by: Pratibha Patil

Personal details
- Born: 25 May 1961 (age 64) Thenur, Madurai

T. Raja (born 25 May 1961) is an Indian Judge. He was the Acting Chief Justice of Madras High Court.

== Career ==
Raja was born on 25 May 1961, in a village in Thenur, Madurai, India. He studied law at Madurai Law College and became an Advocate in 1988. On 9 February 2008, he was appointed as an Additional Advocate General to the Madurai Bench of the Madras High Court. On 31 March 2009, he was appointed as an Additional judge of the Madras High Court and was made a permanent judge on 3 January 2012. On 22 September 2022, he was appointed as Acting Chief Justice of the Madras High Court.
