= Navniti Prasad Singh =

Indian judge (born 1955)

Navniti Prasad Singh (born 6 November 1955) is a retired Indian judge and former Chief Justice of the Kerala High Court.

== Career ==
Singh completed his schooling from Scindia School of Gwalior, graduated and passed Law from Delhi University. He was enrolled as Advocate on 2 July 1980 and started practice in Patna and Jharkhand High Court on Commercial, Taxation and Constitutional matters. In his lawyer career he appeared on behalf of the State Bank of India, Lalit Narayan Mithila University and other statutory authorities. Singh became a Senior Advocate in December 2004. On 6 March 2006 he was appointed an additional judge of Patna High Court. Justice Singh was appointed Chief Justice of the Kerala High Court on 20 March 2017. He retired on 6 November 2017.
