= Nishita Nirmal Mhatre =

Indian judge

Nishita Nirmal Mhatre is a retired Indian judge who served as the Acting Chief Justice of Calcutta High Court. She joined office on 1 December 2016 and retired as the acting chief justice of the Calcutta High Court on 18 September 2017. During her tenure as the Acting Chief justice, she presided over the high-profile sting operation of the Trinamool Congress leaders popularly known as the Narada case and ordered a CBI investigation in that case.

== Early life ==
Mhatre was born on 20 September 1955. For her post-secondary education, Mhatre attended Sophia College and Government Law College, Mumbai. Apart from law, Mhatre also studied microbiology.

== Legal profession ==
In 1978, Mhatre began her legal career with the Bar Council of Maharashtra and Goa as a practicing Advocate in the Bombay High Court and before the Industrial and Labour Courts in Mumbai. She was elevated in the year 2001 as a judge in the Bombay High Court until her transfer in 2012 to the Calcutta High Court.

In 2016, she became acting Chief Justice after the retirement of the Chief Justice Girish Chandra Gupta.

Justice Mhatre retired in 2017 as acting Chief Justice of the Calcutta High Court.
