= Y. Bhaskar Rao =

Anti-corruption ombudsman organization

Y. Bhaskar Rao was the Lokayukta in an anti-corruption ombudsman organization, Karnataka state in India. Bhaskar Rao was appointed the Lokayukta in February 2013. Hailing from Andhra Pradesh, he served as the Chief Justice of Karnataka High Court earlier.

== Accusation ==
On 26 June 2015, days after charges of alleged bribery scandal in the Lokayukta, Justice Y. Bhaskar Rao announced that he had handed over the case to the Central Crime Branch for investigation; Justice Rao's son, Ashwin Rao allegedly misused the office of the Lokayukta.

Karnataka Lokayukta Act, 1984 was amended to bring clarity in the procedure to remove a Lokayukta or Upa Lokayukta, with the sole intention to remove Rao.

== Removal ==
Facing the prospect of his removal, controversial Karnataka Lokayukta Y Bhaskar Rao resigned over an alleged extortion racket in the anti-graft ombudsman's office involving his son.

On 4 August 2016, Y Bhaskar Rao was chargesheeted by CBI.
