= List of chief justices of the Patna High Court =

Chief Justice of Patna High Court
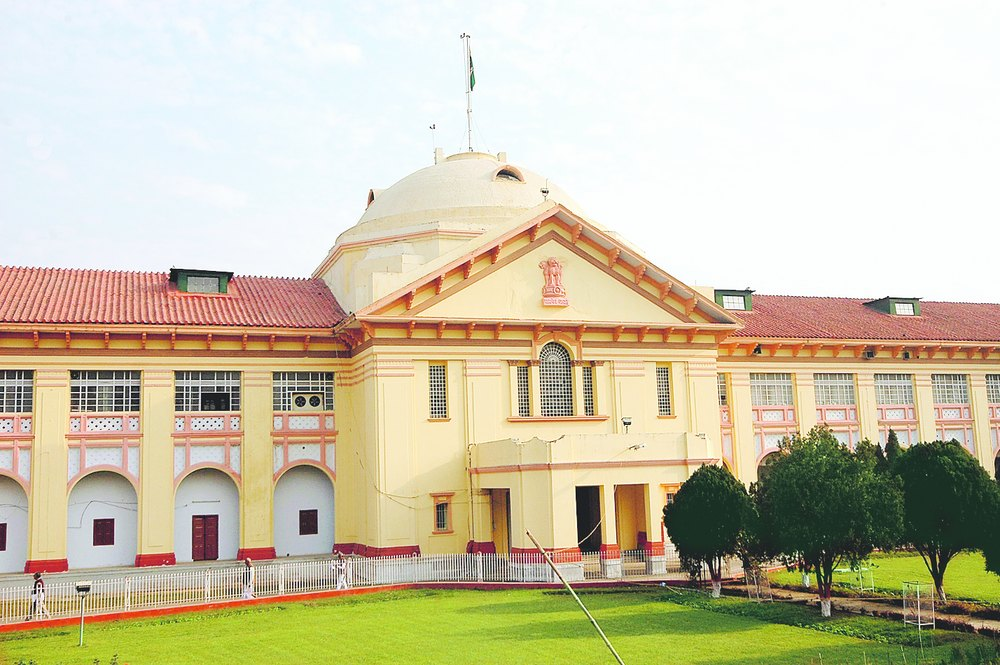
- Incumbent; V. Kameswar Rao since 13 September 2026
- Patna High Court
- Abbreviation: CJ Patna
- Seat: Patna, Bihar, India
- Nominator: Collegium of the Supreme Court
- Appointer: President of India
- Term length: till the age of 62 yrs
- Constituting instrument: Constitution of India (under Article 214)
- Formation: 9 February 1916; 110 years ago
- First holder: Justice Edward Maynard Des Champs Chamier (1 March 1916 – 30 October 1917)
- Salary: ₹250,000 (US$2,700) (per month)
- Website: https://patnahighcourt.gov.in/

The list shows incumbent and past chief justices of Patna High Court, the high court of the state of Bihar. In Indian legal jurisdiction, high courts are instituted as constitutional courts under the Indian Constitution.

Colour Key

- Served as Chief Justice of India
- Female Chief Justice
- Elevated to Supreme Court of India
- Female chief justice elevated to Supreme Court of India

Symbol Key

- ^{‡} Resigned
- ^{†} Died in office

Chief Justices elevated to Supreme Court of India includes those who were elevated to supreme court at any point of their career.

Chief Justices mentioned in italics were those who were serving as Acting Chief Justice in the same high court immediately before their permanent appointment.

Date of initial appointment - Date of first appointment as High court judge

CJ - Chief Justice

== List ==
The Patna High Court was established on 9 February 1916 under Letters Patent issued by the British Crown and has had 48 permanent Chief Justices and several Acting Chief Justices. Website of Bihar State Legal Services Authority contains list of its former patron in chiefs who always had been the chief justice of Patna High Court (whether acting or permanent). Thus the list contained in this website would serve as primary reference for acting chief justices after 1999.

#	Name	Portrait	Date of Appointment	Date of Retirement	Tenure	Parent High Court	Date of initial Appointment	Notes
1	Edward Maynard Des Champs Chamier		1 March 1916	30 October 1917	1 year, 244 days	Allahabad	1910	
2	Thomas Fredrick Dawson Miller		31 October 1917	30 March 1928	10 years, 152 days	Bar	--	
3 Expand	Courtney Terrell		31 March 1928	6 May 1938^{[‡]}	10 years, 37 days	Bar	--	
--	Fazl Ali		7 May 1938	9 October 1938	156 days	Patna	11 April 1928	
4	Arthur Trevor Harries		10 October 1938	18 January 1943	4 years, 101 days	Allahabad	1934	(Note: Transferred to Lahore High Court)
5	Saiyid Fazl Ali		19 January 1943	14 October 1946	3 years, 269 days	Patna	11 April 1928	(Note: Elevated to Federal Court of India on 9 June 1947 after retiring as High Court Judge on 14 October 1946)
6	Clifford Monmohan Agarwala		9 January 1948	24 January 1950^{[‡]}	2 years, 16 days	Patna	11 July 1933	(Note: He became ACJ on 15 October 1946 and served till 8 January 1948 for 1 year, 86 days before becoming permanent Chief Justice)
7	Herbert Ribton Meredith		25 January 1950	7 April 1950	73 days	Patna	1 October 1940	
8	Pandit Lakshami Kant Jha		8 April 1950	31 May 1952	2 years, 54 days	Bar	--	
9	David Ezra Reuben		1 June 1952	2 September 1953	1 year, 94 days	Patna	14 August 1943	
10	Syed Jafar Imam		3 September 1953	9 January 1955	1 year, 129 days	Patna	25 October 1943	
11	Sudhansu Kumar Das		10 January 1955	29 April 1956	1 year, 111 days	Patna	4 November 1944	
12	Vaidyanathier Ramaswami		30 April 1956	3 January 1965	8 years, 249 days	Patna	1 November 1947	
13	Ramaswamy Laxman Narasimham		4 January 1965	2 August 1968	3 years, 212 days	Orissa	26 July 1948	(Note: CJ of Orissa High Court transferred as CJ of Patna)
14	Satish Chandra Mishra		9 November 1968	4 September 1970	1 year, 300 days	Patna	11 December 1952	(Note: He became ACJ on 3 August 1968 and served till 8 November 1968 for 98 days before becoming permanent Chief Justice)
15	Ujjal Narayan Sinha		5 September 1970	28 September 1972	2 years, 24 days	Patna	29 October 1957	
16	Nand Lall Untwalia		29 September 1972	2 October 1974	2 years, 4 days	Patna	2 January 1958	
17	Shyam Nandan Prasad Singh		3 October 1974	30 April 1976	1 year, 211 days	Patna	1 December 1959	
18 Expand	Krishna Ballabh Narayan Singh		19 July 1976	12 March 1982	5 years, 237 days	Patna	15 November 1966	(Note: He became ACJ on 1 May 1976 and served till 18 July 1976 for 79 days before becoming permanent Chief Justice and later transferred as CJ to Madras High Court)
--	Syed Sarwar Ali		13 March 1982	28 November 1983	1 year, 261 days	Patna	6 April 1970	
19	Surjit Singh Sandhawalia		29 November 1983	27 July 1987	3 years, 241 days	Punjab & Haryana	28 May 1968	(Note: CJ of Punjab & Haryana High Court transferred as CJ of Patna)
20 Expand	Bhagwati Prasad Jha		2 January 1988	2 January 1988	1 day	Patna	12 April 1973	(Note: He became ACJ on 28 July 1987 and served till 1 January 1988 for 158 days before becoming permanent Chief Justice)
--	S. K. Jha		3 January 1988	30 April 1988	119 days	Patna	12 April 1973	
21	Dipak Kumar Sen		1 May 1988	1 May 1989	1 year, 1 day	Calcutta	5 March 1973	
22	Shushil Kumar Jha		19 October 1989	23 October 1989	5 days	Patna	12 April 1973	(Note: He became ACJ on 2 May 1989 and served till 18 October 1989 for 170 days before becoming permanent Chief Justice and later transferred as CJ to Madhya Pradesh High Court)
23 Expand	Gangadhar Ganesh Sohani		24 October 1989	17 December 1990	1 year, 55 days	Madhya Pradesh	2 June 1973	(Note: CJ of Madhya Pradesh High Court transferred as CJ of Patna)
--	N. P. Singh		18 December 1990	3 February 1991	48 days	Patna	12 April 1973	(Note: Elevated as Chief Justice of Calcutta High Court)
24	Bimal Chandra Basak		18 March 1991	21 January 1994	2 years, 310 days	Calcutta	10 June 1974	
25	Krishnaswami Sundara Paripoornan		24 January 1994	10 June 1994	141 days	Kerala	23 December 1982	
26 Expand	Konduswami Venkataswamy		19 June 1994	5 March 1995	260 days	Madras	24 July 1983	
--	B. L. Yadav		6 March 1995	18 May 1995	74 days	Allahabad	24 May 1984	
27	Gopal Ballav Pattanaik		19 May 1995	10 September 1995	115 days	Orissa	1 June 1983	
28 Expand	Devinder Pratap Wadhwa		29 September 1995	20 March 1997	1 year, 173 days	Delhi	12 August 1983	
--	J. N. Dubey		21 March 1997	8 July 1997	110 days	Allahabad	24 May 1984	
29 Expand	Brij Mohan Lal		9 July 1997	6 October 1999	2 years, 90 days	Madhya Pradesh	14 May 1984	
--	B. N. Agrawal		7 October 1999	17 November 1999	42 days	Patna	17 November 1986	(Note: Elevated as Chief Justice of Orissa High Court)
--	B. P. Singh		18 November 1999	24 January 2000	68 days	Patna	9 March 1987	
30 Expand	Ravi Swaroop Dhavan		25 January 2000	22 July 2004	4 years, 180 days	Allahabad	9 January 1986	
--	Nagendra Rai		22 July 2004	17 July 2005	361 days	Patna	10 July 1990	
31 Expand	Jitendrakumar Nanalal Bhatt		18 July 2005	16 October 2007	2 years, 91 days	Gujarat	21 June 1990	
--	Narayan Roy		16 October 2007	4 January 2008	81 days	Patna	2 December 1991	(Note: Elevated as Chief Justice of Rajasthan High Court)
32 Expand	Rajesh Balia		5 January 2008	3 March 2008	59 days	Rajasthan	21 October 1991	
--	C. K. Prasad		4 March 2008	12 May 2008	70 days	Patna	2 December 1991	
33 Expand	Rajendra Mal Lodha		13 May 2008	16 December 2008	218 days	Rajasthan	31 January 1994	
--	C. K. Prasad		17 December 2008	15 March 2009	89 days	Patna	8 November 1994	(Note: Elevated as Chief Justice of Allahabad High Court)
34 Expand	Jacob Benjamin Koshy		16 March 2009	12 May 2009	58 days	Kerala	17 January 1996	
--	S. K. Singh		13 May 2009	11 August 2009	91 days	Patna	29 December 1998	
35 Expand	Prafulla Kumar Mishra		12 August 2009	16 September 2009	36 days	Orissa	17 January 1996	
--	S. K. Singh		17 September 2009	22 December 2009	97 days	Patna	29 December 1998	
36 Expand	Dipak Misra		23 December 2009	23 May 2010	152 days	Orissa	17 January 1996	(Note: Transferred to Delhi High Court)
--	S. K. Singh		24 May 2010	20 June 2010	28 days	Patna	29 December 1998	
37 Expand	Rekha Manharlal Doshit		21 June 2010	12 December 2014	4 years, 175 days	Gujarat	18 September 1995	
--	I. A. Ansari		13 December 2014	1 January 2015	20 days	Gauhati	4 March 2002	
38	Lingala Narasimha Reddy		2 January 2015	31 July 2015	211 days	Andhra Pradesh	10 September 2001	
39 Expand	Iqbal Ahmed Ansari		29 July 2016	28 October 2016	92 days	Gauhati	4 March 2002	(Note: He became ACJ on 1 August 2015 and served till 28 July 2016 for 363 days before becoming permanent Chief Justice)
--	Hemant Gupta		29 October 2016	14 March 2017	137 days	Punjab & Haryana	2 July 2002	(Note: Elevated as Chief Justice of Madhya Pradesh High Court)
40 Expand	Rajendra Menon		15 March 2017	8 August 2018	1 year, 147 days	Madhya Pradesh	1 April 2002	
--	Ravi Ranjan		9 August 2018	11 August 2018	3 days	Patna	14 July 2008	
41 Expand	Mukesh Rasikbhai Shah		12 August 2018	1 November 2018	82 days	Gujarat	7 March 2004	
--	Ravi Ranjan		2 November 2018	16 November 2018	15 days	Patna	14 July 2008	
42	Amreshwar Pratap Sahi		17 November 2018	10 November 2019	359 days	Allahabad	24 September 2004	(Note: Transferred to Madras High Court)
43 Expand	Sanjay Karol		11 November 2019	5 February 2023	3 years, 87 days	Himachal Pradesh	8 March 2007	(Note: CJ of Tripura High Court transferred as CJ of Patna)
--	C. S. Singh		6 February 2023	28 March 2023	51 days	Patna	5 April 2012	
44 Expand	Krishnan Vinod Chandran		29 March 2023	15 January 2025	1 year, 293 days	Kerala	8 November 2011	
--	Ashutosh Kumar		16 January 2025	20 July 2025	186 days	Patna	15 May 2014	(Note: Elevated as Chief Justice of Gauhati High Court)
45	Vipul Manubhai Pancholi		21 July 2025	28 August 2025	39 days	Gujarat	1 October 2014	
46 Expand	Pavankumar Bhimappa Bajanthri		21 September 2025	22 October 2025	32 days	Karnataka	2 January 2015	(Note: He became ACJ on 29 August 2025 and served till 20 September 2025 for 23 days before becoming permanent Chief Justice)
--	Sudhir Singh		23 October 2025	6 January 2026	76 days	Patna	15 April 2015	
47	Sangam Kumar Sahoo		7 January 2026	4 June 2026	149 days	Orissa	2 July 2014	
48 Expand	Meenakshi Madan Rai		5 June 2026	11 July 2026	37 days	Sikkim	15 April 2015	
--	Sudhir Singh		12 July 2026	12 September 2026	63 days	Patna	15 April 2015	

== See also ==
- List of High Courts of India
- Patna High Court
- List of former chief justices of the high courts of India
- List of former acting chief justices of the high courts of India
