= Bhuvaneshwar Prasad Sinha =

Chief Justice of India from 1959 to 1964

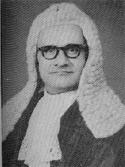

6th Chief Justice of India
- In office 1 October 1959 – 31 January 1964
- Appointed by: Rajendra Prasad
- Preceded by: Sudhi Ranjan Das
- Succeeded by: P. B. Gajendragadkar

Judge of Supreme Court of India
- In office 3 December 1954 – 30 September 1959
- Nominated by: Mehr Chand Mahajan
- Appointed by: Rajendra Prasad

4th Chief Justice of Nagpur High court
- In office 24 February 1951 – 2 December 1954
- Appointed by: Rajendra Prasad
- Preceded by: Vivian Bose
- Succeeded by: Mohammed Hidayatullah

Judge of Patna High Court
- In office 19 January 1943 – 23 February 1951
- Appointed by: Lord Linlithgow
- Chief Justice: Arthur Trevor Harries

Personal details
- Born: 1 February 1899 Shahabad, Bengal Presidency (Now in Bhojpur, Bihar, India)
- Died: 12 November 1986 (aged 87)
- Relations: B. P. Singh (grandson); S. K. Singh (grandson); A. K. Singh (great grandson)
- Children: Rameshwar Prasad Sinha
- Education: B.A. (Hons.), M. A.
- Alma mater: Patna College; Patna Law College

Bhuvaneshwar Prasad Sinha [Title: Sinha] of Shahabad (now Bhojpur), Bengal Presidency (1 February 1899 – 12 November 1986) was the 6th Chief Justice of India (1 October 1959 – 31 January 1964). He also served as the president of the Bharat Scouts and Guides from April 1965 to February 1967.

Sinha served as the Chief Justice of the Supreme Court of India from 1 October 1959 to 31 January 1964. Over the course of his Supreme Court tenure, Sinha authored 137 judgments and sat on 684 benches.

== Life ==
Sinha was born and brought up in a prominent Rajput (Kshatriya) family of Rajwada Gajiyapur Estate, Arrah (present Bhojpur) District. His grandson B. P. Singh is a former judge of the Supreme Court of India.

A deeply religious man, following his retirement, Sinha led a quiet life mostly devoted to spiritual pursuits, though he did accept a number of private arbitration cases. Becoming blind in his later years, he died in 1986.

== Career ==
He was educated at the Arrah Zilla School, Patna College and Patna Law College.

Sinha topped the list of candidates at the B.A. (Hons) in 1919 and M.A in 1921 at the Patna University. He was a Vakil in the Patna High Court from 1922 to 1927. Later he became an advocate in 1927 and also got the position of Lecturer at the Govt. Law College, Patna, both of which he remained till 1935. He also was a member of the Senate of the Faculty of Law and of the Board of Examiners in Law, Patna Univ. He became the member of the Court of the Benaras Hindu University where he was a Government Pleader from 1935 to 1939. He was Srimati Radhika Sinha Gold Medalist for standing first in History.

He became an Assistant Govt. Advocate in 1940 and the Judge of Patna High Court on 19 January 1943. He was elevated to the position of the Chief Justice of Nagpur High Court in 1951 and eventually to the Judge of Supreme Court in December 1954 at which he remained till 30 September 1959. He finally became the Chief Justice of India in 1959 and remained so till 1964 and then he retired.

== Published works ==
- Reminiscences and Reflections of a Chief Justice ISBN 81-7018-253-0, 1985, 1st ed.

Legal offices
Preceded by Sudhi Ranjan Das	Chief Justice of India; 30 September 1959 – 31 January 1964	Succeeded by P. B. Gajendragadkar

Preceded by Ammu Swaminathan	Presidents of the Bharat Scouts and Guides; 1965–1967	Succeeded by Sir Chandulal M. Trivedi
