= Ahsanuddin Amanullah =

Judge of the Supreme Court of India

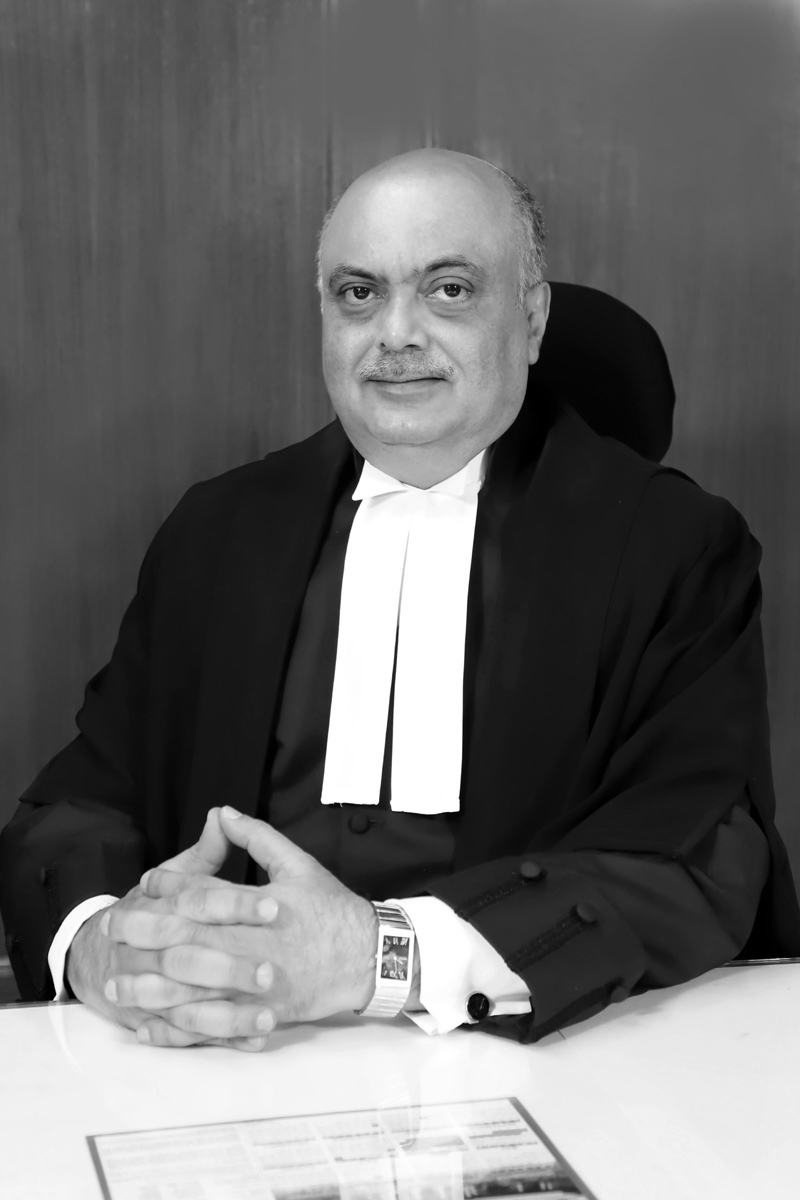

Judge of the Supreme Court of India
- Incumbent
- Assumed office 6 February 2023
- Nominated by: Dhananjaya Y. Chandrachud
- Appointed by: Droupadi Murmu

Judge of the Patna High Court
- In office 20 June 2022 – 6 February 2023
- Nominated by: N. V. Ramana
- Appointed by: Ram Nath Kovind

Judge of the Andhra Pradesh High Court
- In office 10 October 2021 – 20 June 2022
- Nominated by: N. V. Ramana
- Appointed by: Ram Nath Kovind

Judge of the Patna High Court
- In office 20 June 2011 – 10 October 2021
- Nominated by: S. H. Kapadia
- Appointed by: Pratibha Patil

Personal details
- Born: 11 May 1963 (age 63)

Ahsanuddin Amanullah (born 11 May 1963) is a judge of the Supreme Court of India. He is a former judge of the Patna High Court and the Andhra Pradesh High Court.

== Early life and education ==
Ahsanuddin Amanullah was born on 11 May 1963 to an eminent family hailing from Bihar. He is the second son of Late Nehaluddin Amanullah and Late Mrs. Ishrati Amanullah. After completing his schooling from St Michael’s High School, Patna, he obtained a Bachelor's in Science (Chemistry Honours) from Aligarh Muslim University and then an LL.B. from the Patna Law College.

== Professional career ==
He enrolled as an Advocate on 27 September 1991 with the Bihar State Bar Council and made rapid strides in the profession.

He was in regular practice, primarily in the Patna High Court and also appeared before the Supreme Court of India and the Delhi High Court, Calcutta High Court and Jharkhand High Court in Constitutional, Civil, Criminal, Service, Taxation, Co-operative, Labour, Corporate, Forest, Board, Corporation, Arbitration, Contempt and Miscellaneous matters. He came to be known for his expertise in Constitutional and Service Laws. He handled private briefs of writ and other cases as well. In addition, he appeared before the Central Administrative Tribunal, Commercial Taxes Tribunal, District Courts, the District Consumer Disputes Redressal Forum, the Board of Revenue etc.

He left an extensive practice on the private side when requested by the Advocate General, Bihar to serve as Standing Counsel to the Government of Bihar (March 2006 - August 2010). Thereafter, he was appointed Government Advocate for the State of Bihar (August 2010 onwards) until he rose to the Bench. He was called upon to render assistance to the Court as Amicus Curiae in several significant matters. He has been associated with social issues pro bono publico. He was Counsel for the District Administration before the Dalsingsarai (Samastipur) Firing Enquiry Commission and the Special Counsel for the Income Tax Department, Government of India in the Jharkhand High Court at Ranchi.

He has represented and appeared for the Indian Railways, Unit Trust of India, Union Bank of India, RITES (previously Rail India Technical and Economic Services Limited), Indian Railway Catering and Tourism Corporation Limited (IRCTC), Bihar State Housing Board, Bihar State Electricity Board, Bihar State Textbook Publishing Corporation, Bihar State Cooperative Bank Limited, Bihar State Cooperative Marketing Union Limited (BISCOMAUN), Bihar Cooperative Land Development Bank Limited, Bihar State Agricultural Marketing Board, Bihar State Housing Cooperative Federation, Bihar State Credit and Investment Corporation (BICICO), Commercial Taxes Department (Government of Bihar), Magadh University at Bodh Gaya, Veer Kuer Singh University at Arrah, Samsung Corporation (Engineering & Construction Group), Mahindra and Mahindra, Bihar Industrial Area Development Authority, Bihar State Health Society etc. before various judicial and quasi-judicial fora, primarily the Constitutional Courts.

He has been instrumental in drafting and vetting subordinate and delegated legislation for various Acts passed by the Bihar Legislature. He served as counsel for a number of other government organisations, universities, corporate houses and was Legal Advisor to various establishments. Upon special request by the Advocate General, Maharashtra, he was nominated by the Advocate General, Bihar to represent the State of Maharashtra. He was Assistant Returning Officer for elections to the Bihar State Bar Council in 2002 and the Jharkhand State Bar Council in 2006. As an Advocate, he addressed Indian Administrative Service probationers at the Lal Bahadur Shastri National Academy of Administration, Mussoorie.

He served as chairman, Patna High Court Juvenile Justice Committee; Member, Board of Governors, Bihar Judicial Academy, Patna, and; chairman, Patna High Court Legal Services Committee.

He was appointed Executive Chairman, Andhra Pradesh State Legal Services Authority on 8 November 2021. He was appointed Chairperson, Bihar Judicial Academy on 11 October 2022. He was appointed Executive Chairman, Bihar State Legal Services Authority on 29 November 2022.

He was elevated as judge of the Patna High Court on 20 June 2011. Upon transfer, he joined the High Court of Andhra Pradesh on 10 October 2021. He was re-transferred to Patna High Court on 20 June 2022.

He was elevated to the Supreme Court on 6 February 2023.

He is amongst the few judges elevated directly without serving as a chief justice of the High Court.
