= Sangam Kumar Sahoo =

47th Chief Justice of Patna High Court

Hon'ble Chief Justice (Retd.) Sangam Kumar Sahoo
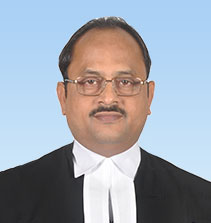

47th Chief Justice of Patna High Court
- In office 7 January 2026 – 4 June 2026
- Nominated by: Surya Kant
- Appointed by: Droupadi Murmu
- Preceded by: P. B. Bajanthri; Sudhir Singh (acting)
- Succeeded by: Meenakshi Madan Rai

Judge of Orissa High Court
- In office 2 July 2014 – 6 January 2026
- Nominated by: R. M. Lodha
- Appointed by: Pranab Mukherjee

Personal details
- Born: 5 June 1964 (age 62)
- Parent: Sarat Chandra Sahoo
- Education: B.Sc, M.A. (in English and Oriya) and LL.B
- Alma mater: Utkal University

Sangam Kumar Sahoo (born 5 June 1964) is a retired Indian jurist who had served as the 47th Chief Justice of Patna High Court. He is a former judge of the Orissa High Court.

== Career ==
Justice Sahoo was born on 5 June 1964. He did his B.Sc. from Stewart Science College, Cuttack and LLB from Law College of Cuttack. He was enrolled as an advocate on 26 November 1989 with Bar Council of Odisha.

He started his practice under the guidance of his father Late Sarat Chandra Sahoo, who was a criminal advocate. He practiced as an advocate in the Orissa High Court, District Courts, State Administrative Tribunal, Central Administrative Tribunal and Consumer forums.

He was as appointed as Judge of Orissa High Court on 2 July 2014 and served there till he was elevated the as Chief Justice of Patna High Court.

On 18 December 2025, Supreme Court Collegium led by CJI Surya Kant recommended his name for his appointment as Chief Justice of the Patna High Court. Central government cleared his name for elevation as Chief Justice on 1 January 2026.
