= Sudhir Singh =

Indian judge (born 1965)

Hon'ble Justice Sudhir Singh

16th Chief Justice of Uttarakhand High Court
- Nominee
- Assuming office TBD
- Nominated by: Surya Kant
- Succeeding: M. K. Gupta; M. K. Tiwari (acting)

Judge of Patna High Court
- Incumbent
- Assumed office 22 July 2025
- Nominated by: B. R. Gavai
- Appointed by: Droupadi Murmu
- Acting Chief Justice
- In office 12 July 2026 – 12 September 2026
- Appointed by: Droupadi Murmu
- Preceded by: Meenakshi Madan Rai
- Succeeded by: V. Kameswar Rao
- In office 23 October 2025 – 6 January 2026
- Appointed by: Droupadi Murmu
- Preceded by: P. B. Bajanthri
- Succeeded by: Sangam Kumar Sahoo

Judge of Punjab & Haryana High Court
- In office 2 November 2023 – 21 July 2025
- Nominated by: D. Y. Chandrachud
- Appointed by: Droupadi Murmu

Judge of Patna High Court
- In office 15 April 2015 – 1 November 2023
- Nominated by: H. L. Dattu
- Appointed by: Pranab Mukherjee

Personal details
- Born: 11 December 1965 (age 60)
- Parent: Nagendra Prasad Singh
- Education: Patna College (B.A.), Patna Law College (LL.B)

Sudhir Singh (born 11 December 1965) is an Indian jurist, who is currently serving as judge of the Patna High Court. He is former Judge of the Punjab and Haryana High Court. He also served as Acting Chief Justice of the Patna High Court twice in 2025 and 2026.

== Family ==
Singh was born on 11 December 1965 to his father Nagendra Prasad Singh, who later became judge of Supreme Court of India. His great-grandfather Nand Kishore Prasad Singh practised at the District Court in Chhapra, while his grandfather Baldeo Prasad Singh was a barrister who practised at the Patna High Court and served as President of the Barristers’ Association for many years.

== Education ==
Singh completed his schooling at Vikas Vidyalaya, Ranchi, graduated in Political Science from Patna College, and obtained his LL.B. degree from Patna Law College both colleges affiliated with Patna University. He enrolled as an advocate in 1991 and practised primarily in criminal law and writ matters. He served as Central Government Counsel for the Union of India, Railway Advocate for the Ministry of Railways, Additional Standing Counsel for the Indian Audit and Accounts Department, and Assistant Solicitor General of India at the Patna High Court.

== Career ==
Sudhir Singh was appointed as Additional Judge of the Patna High Court on 15 April 2015 and became permanent on 20 April 2016. In August 2023, Supreme Court collegium recommended his transfer to Punjab and Haryana High Court and he was transferred on 2 November 2023. However, in May 2025, collegium recommended his repatriation to Patna High Court which was cleared in July and he was transferred back to the Patna High Court on 22 July 2025. In October 2025, he was appointed as Acting Chief Justice of Patna High Court following retirement of Chief Justice P. B. Bajanthri. He was again appointed to same post in July 2026 after retirement of Chief Justice Meenakshi Madan Rai and served till appointment of V. Kameswar Rao as new Chief Justice in September 2026.

On 26 October 2026, Supreme Court collegium recommended his elevation as the Chief Justice of the Uttarakhand High Court.
