= Vaidyanathier Ramaswami =

Former judge of Supreme Court of India (1965-1969)

Hon'ble Justice (Retd.) Vaidyanathier Ramaswami

Judge of Supreme Court of India
- In office 4 January 1965 – 30 October 1969
- Nominated by: P. B. Gajendragadkar
- Appointed by: S. Radhakrishnan

12th Chief Justice of Patna High Court
- In office 30 April 1956 – 3 January 1965
- Nominated by: Sudhi Ranjan Das
- Appointed by: Rajendra Prasad
- Preceded by: Sudhansu Kumar Das
- Succeeded by: R. L. Narasimham

Judge of Patna High Court
- In office 1 November 1947 – 29 April 1956
- Appointed by: Lord Mountbatten

Personal details
- Born: 30 October 1904 Madras Presidency, British India
- Education: Presidency College, Chennai; University of Allahabad; University of Oxford; Inner Temple
- Profession: Indian Civil Servant, Judge

Vaidyanathier Ramaswami (30 October 1904 – Not known) was an Indian civil servant and judge who served as the Judge of the Supreme Court of India. He also served as the 12th Chief Justice of Patna High Court and judge in the same High Court.

== Education ==
Vaidyanathier Ramaswami was born on 30 October 1904 in the Madras Presidency of British India. He received his education at Presidency College, Madras, and subsequently studied at the University of Allahabad and the University of Oxford. He also studied law at the Inner Temple in London and became Barrister-at-Law.

== Civil services ==
Ramaswami joined the Indian Civil Service (ICS) on 9 October 1929. He began his administrative career in Bihar as an Assistant Magistrate and Collector on 9 December 1929, serving in that capacity until 29 June 1933. He subsequently served as Secretary to the Orissa Committee under the Government of India and as a Reforms Officer from 30 June to 15 November 1933. He returned to Bihar as a Joint Magistrate from 21 November 1933 to 24 February 1936. Ramaswami became an officiating District and Sessions Judge in March 1936 and served until 31 October 1946. He then joined the Patna High Court as a Special Officer on 1 November 1946 and became its Registrar on 11 November 1946, serving in that position until 31 October 1947, apart from a brief period when he acted as a High Court judge (in August 1947).

== Judicial career ==
He was appointed an Additional Judge of the Patna High Court on 1 November 1947 and became a permanent on 28 October 1948. He was appointed as Chief Justice of the Patna High Court on 30 April 1956 following elevation of Chief Justice Sudhansu Kumar Das to Supreme Court of India. He served in this position till 3 January 1965 becoming the third longest serving Chief Justice of Patna High Court and the longest serving Indian Chief Justice of Patna High Court with tenure of 8 Years and 8 months.

On 4 January 1965, Ramaswami was elevated as a Judge of the Supreme Court of India becoming the third consecutive Chief Justice of Patna High Court to get elevated to Supreme Court after Syed Jafar Imam and Sudhansu Kumar Das. He served in Supreme Court until his retirement on 30 October 1969.

He was one of the six civil service judges, who were elevated to Supreme Court of India. Other civil service judges were, Kailas Nath Wanchoo, Sudhansu Kumar Das, Kulada Charan Das Gupta, Raghubar Dayal and Vashishtha Bhargava.
