= Nand Lall Untwalia =

Indian Judge

Judge of the Supreme Court of India
- In office 3 October 1974 – 31 July 1980
- Appointed by: Fakhruddin Ali Ahmed

14th Chief Justice of the Patna High Court
- In office 29 September 1972 – 2 October 1974
- Preceded by: Ujjal Narayan Sinha
- Succeeded by: S. Sarwar Ali

Judge of the Patna High Court
- In office 2 January 1958 – 28 September 1972

Personal details
- Born: August 1, 1915
- Education: G.B.B. College, University of Calcutta
- Profession: Lawyer, Judge

Nand Lall Untwalia (1 August 1915 – ?) was an Indian Judge who served as a Judge of the Supreme Court of India.

== Career ==
Untwalia was born in 1915. He passed Matriculation from Sitamarhi High English School in Sitamarhi, Bihar and graduated from G.B.B. College in Muzaffarpur. He obtained his Bachelor of Law from Calcutta University in 1940. He started at the Muzaffarpur District courts and in the Patna High Court. Untwalia was appointed as an Additional Judge of the Patna High Court on 2 January 1958 and became a permanent judge of the court on 4 November 1958. On 29 September 1972, he was appointed Chief Justice of the Patna High Court. Untwalia was elevated to the Supreme Court of India as a judge on 3 October 1974, where he served until his retirement on 31 July 1980.
