= V. Kameswar Rao =

49th Chief Justice of Patna High Court

Hon'ble Chief Justice Valluri Kameswar Rao

49th Chief Justice of Patna High Court
- Incumbent
- Assumed office 13 September 2026
- Nominated by: Surya Kant
- Appointed by: Droupadi Murmu
- Preceding: Meenakshi Madan Rai; Sudhir Singh (acting)

Judge of Delhi High Court
- In office 21 July 2025 – 12 September 2026
- Nominated by: B. R. Gavai
- Appointed by: Droupadi Murmu
- In office 17 April 2013 – 31 May 2024
- Nominated by: Altamas Kabir
- Appointed by: Pranab Mukherjee

Judge of Karnataka High Court
- In office 1 June 2024 – 20 July 2025
- Nominated by: D. Y. Chandrachud
- Appointed by: Droupadi Murmu
- Acting Chief Justice
- In office 30 May 2025 – 18 July 2025
- Appointed by: Droupadi Murmu
- Preceded by: N. V. Anjaria
- Succeeded by: Vibhu Bakhru

Personal details
- Born: 7 August 1965 (age 61)
- Education: B.A. in Geography (Hons) and L.L.B from Delhi University

Valluri Kameswar Rao (born 7 August 1965) is an Indian judge who is currently serving as the Chief Justice of Patna High Court. He has also earlier served as a judge of Delhi High Court. He has also served as the judge of Karnataka High court from 1 June 2024 to 29 May 2025 where he also served as Acting Chief Justice from 29 May 2025, until his repatriation to Delhi High Court.

== Education and background ==
Rao was born on 7 August 1965, his family hails originally from Andhra Pradesh. His parents were married in 1951, after which his father decided to relocate from Andhra Pradesh to New Delhi in 1954. He laid his foundational higher education at Delhi University, where he initially earned a B.A. (Honours) degree in Geography in 1987 before pursuing his legal education and obtaining an LL.B. degree in 1990. During his collegiate years, he proved his academic prowess by being awarded the Certificate of Merit for ranking second in his college during the 1985–1986 term. He officially embarked on his professional legal journey upon enrolling as an advocate with the Bar Council of Delhi in March 1991.

Following his enrollment, Rao established a versatile and deep practice across several prominent judicial forums, regularly appearing before the Supreme Court of India, the Delhi High Court, and the Principal Bench of the Central Administrative Tribunal (CAT) in New Delhi. His multi-state litigating experience also extended to other major coastal high courts, including the Madras High Court and the Port Blair Circuit Bench of the Calcutta High Court. Over more than two decades at the bar, he earned significant acclaim for handling complex cases centered on service law, labour disputes, arbitration, constitutional matters, and administrative law. He frequently represented large public sector undertakings, major banks, and autonomous bodies, while also serving as an executive member of the Central Administrative Tribunal Bar Association. In recognition of his exceptional standing and mastery of the law, the Delhi High Court designated him as a Senior Advocate in January 2010.

== Career ==
His transition to the bench began when he was elevated as an Additional Judge of the Delhi High Court on 17 April 2013, and he was later sworn in as a permanent judge on 18 March 2015. After more than eleven years of dedicated service in the national capital, he was transferred to the southern judiciary, where he assumed office as a Judge of the Karnataka High Court on 1 June 2024. He was appointed as the Acting Chief Justice of the Karnataka High Court on 30 May 2025 following elevation of the then Chief Justice Nilay Anjaria to Supreme Court of India. Following a highly praised, emotional farewell tenure in Karnataka, Justice Rao was formally repatriated to his parent court. He returned to New Delhi and resumed his duties as a permanent judge of the Delhi High Court on 21 July 2025.

Following his return to Delhi, the Supreme Court Collegium, led by Chief Justice of India Surya Kant, formally recommended him to be appointed as the permanent Chief Justice of the Patna High Court on 6 August 2026. Sudhir Singh was serving as the temporary Acting Chief Justice of Patna High Court. This recommendation was cleared by government on 5 September 2026 and he took oath as the Chief Justice of Patna High Court on 13 September 2026.
