= L. Narasimha Reddy =

Indian judge

Justice (Retd.) L. Narasimha Reddy

38th Chief Justice Patna High Court
- In office 2 January 2015 – 31 July 2015
- Appointed by: Pranab Mukherjee
- Preceded by: Rekha Manharlal Doshit
- Succeeded by: Hon. Iqbal A. Ansari

Personal details
- Born: 1 August 1953 (age 73) Hyderabad State (now Telangana), India
- Citizenship: Indian
- Spouse: Indira
- Children: L. Aravind Reddy, Ashrita

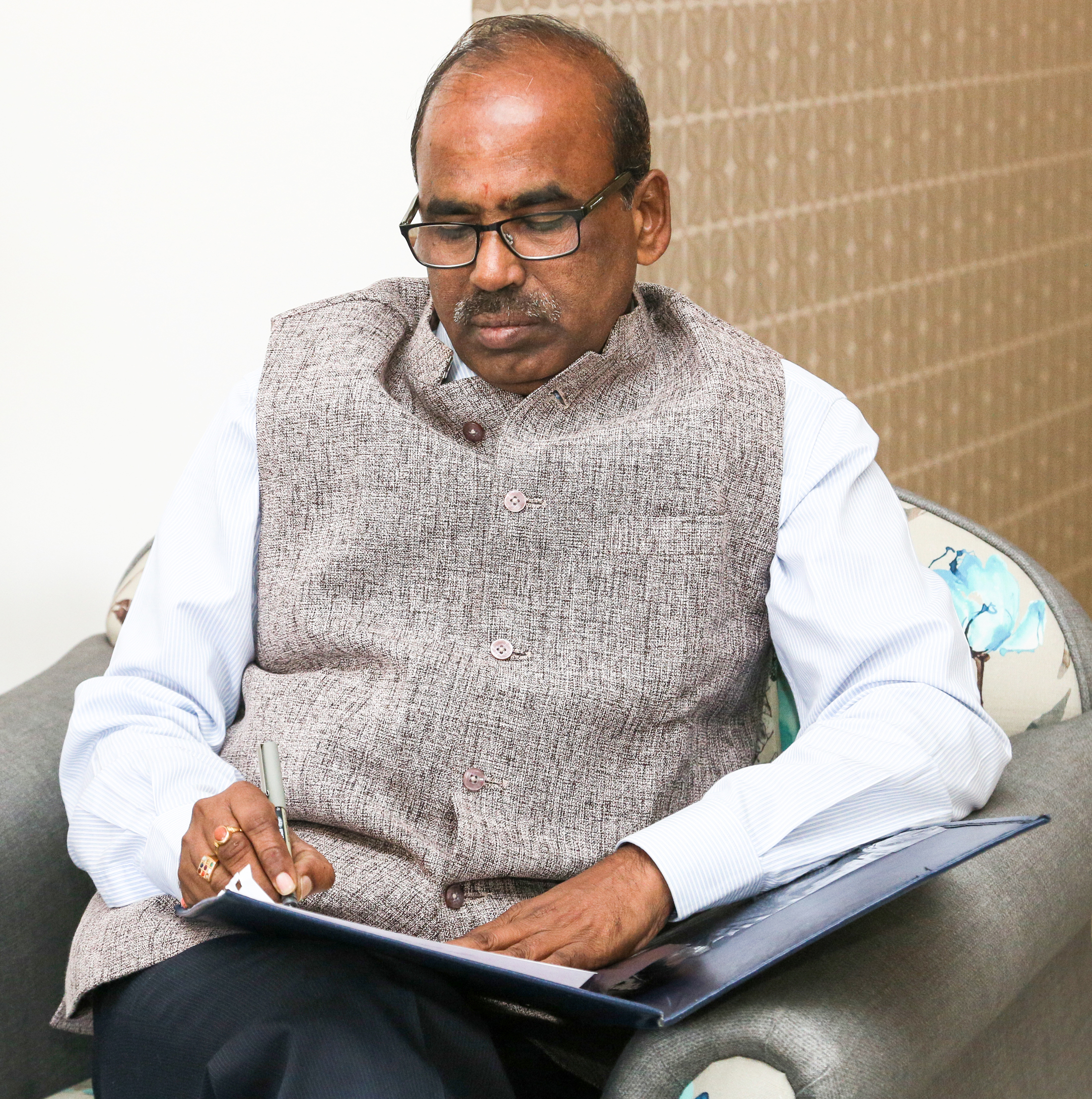
Narasimha Reddy in 2015

Justice L. Narasimha Reddy (born 1 August 1953) was the Chief Justice of Patna High Court and was the senior most judge of Andhra Pradesh High Court. He served as Chairman of the Central Administrative Tribunal and as the Chancellor of University of Hyderabad and the North-Eastern Hill University.

== Education ==
Narasimha Reddy was born in an agricultural family in Gavicharla village, Warangal, Telangana. He received his B.Sc. degree from C.K.M. College, Warangal, and went on to earn his bachelor's as well as master's degree in law (international law) from Osmania University, Hyderabad.
