= Syed Rafat Alam =

Indian judge (1950–2024)

43rd Chief Justice of the Allahabad High Court
- In office 5 August 2011 – 7 August 2012

20th Chief Justice of the Madhya Pradesh High Court
- In office 20 December 2009 – 4 August 2011

Judge of the Allahabad High Court
- In office 28 November 1994 – 19 December 2009

Judge of the Patna High Court
- In office 8 November 1994 – 27 November 1994

Personal details
- Born: 8 August 1950 (age 75) India

Syed Rafat Alam (8 August 1950 – 23 April 2024) was an Indian judge who was the Chief Justice of two High Courts of India: Madhya Pradesh High Court and Allahabad High Court.

== Early life and education ==
Alam was born on 8 August 1950. He graduated in Art with Honours from St. Columba's College, Hazaribagh in 1970 and passed LL.B. from Patna Law College, Patna. After his enrollment in 1975, he started practice in the Patna High Court on Constitutional, Civil Taxation and Education Matters.

== Career ==
Alam served as Standing Counsel for the State of Bihar and Bihar State Electricity Board. He pleaded on behalf of Patna University and Magadh University in the High Court in his lawyer's career. He also worked as part time Lecturer in Law Faculty of College of Commerce, Arts and Science, Patna since 1983 till his elevation as Judge. In 1994 he became the Permanent Judge of the Patna High Court and transferred to Allahabad High Court in the same year. Justice Alam took over the charge of Acting Chief Justice of the Allahabad High Court for various periods. He was appointed Chief Justice of Madhya Pradesh High Court on 20 December 2009. After the retirement he became the Chairman of Uttar Pradesh Human Rights Commission. He died on 23 April 2024, at the age of 73.
