= Iqbal Ahmed Ansari =

Chief Justice of Patna High Court

Chairperson of PSHRC
- In office 1 August 2017 – 1 August 2022
- Preceded by: Jagadish Bhalla
- Succeeded by: Sant Prakash

39th Chief Justice of Patna High Court
- In office 29 July 2016 – 28 October 2016
- Preceded by: L. Narasimha Reddy
- Succeeded by: Rajendra Menon

Personal details
- Born: 29 October 1954 (age 71) Tezpur, Assam

Justice Iqbal Ahmed Ansari (born 29 October 1954) is a retired Indian judge, former Chief Justice of Patna High Court, and former Chairperson of Punjab State Human Rights Commission.

== Career ==
He did his B.Sc. from Darrang College, Tezpur and completed graduation in Law from Tezpur Law College. He was elevated to Guwahati High Court on 4 March 2004. He also served as Executive Chairman of State Legal Services Authority in Arunachal Pradesh and Nagaland and has accordingly performed the duty of legal awareness.

In July 2016 he became the Chief Justice of Patna High Court and retired in October 2016.

On 1 August 2017 he was appointed Chairperson of Punjab State Human Rights Commission.
