= Edward Maynard Des Champs Chamier =

British Indian Judge

1st Chief Justice of Patna High Court
- In office 1 March 1916 – 30 October 1917
- Appointed by: George V
- Preceded by: Position established
- Succeeded by: Thomas Fredrick Dawson Miller

Judge of Allahabad High Court
- In office 1910–1915
- Appointed by: George V

Personal details
- Born: 4 June 1866
- Died: 17 November 1945 (aged 79)

Sir Edward Maynard Des Champs Chamier KCSI KCIE, (4 June 1866 – 17 November 1945) was a British Indian judge and the first Chief Justice of the Patna High Court during the British Raj.

Chamier demonstrated judicial independence in 1916 at the inauguration of the new High Court building by not inviting either of the provincial Lieutenant Governors, Sir Edward Albert Gait, or the Viceroy, Lord Hardinge.

== Career ==
Sir Edward Chamier passed Indian Civil Service. He was knighted on 1 January 1916 and was appointed the Chief Justice of the Patna High Court on 1 March 1916 and retired on 30 October 1917. During this tenure he set up an example of judicial autonomy at the time of inaugurating the High Court building in 1916. In the opening ceremony Justice Chamier neither invited Lieutenant Governor of the province Sir Edward Albert Gait nor even Viceroy Lord Hardinge.

Chamier was legal adviser to the Secretary of State for India in 1925–26.

== Family ==
Married to Alice Mary (May) Cobb (1864 - 1940), who is the daughter of William H Cobb, solicitor in Clifton, York (1833 - 1911) and Emily Alice Hey (1840 - 1913)

Edward Chamier had three children: Stephen Henry DesChamps Chamier (Born: 1897, Allahabad, India - Died: 1949, York, England), who was Captain of West Yorkshire Regiment, serving in WWI 1914-18, and was awarded the Military Cross and the Croix de Guerre avec Palme, and who had two children with his wife, Marjorie Iris Whistler (1907 - 1998); Edward Chamier's second child was a daughter 'Alice DesChamps Chamier' (1900, Allahabad, India - 1991, St Lythans, Cardiff) who married Sydney Norman Gerrans on July 1st 1935, she did not have any children; George DesChamps Chamier (07.12.1906, Lucknow, India - 21.01.1987, Inverness, Scotland), who was Brigadier-General, Kings Own Yorkshire Light Infantry, Royal Artillery, Served in WWII in France and North Africa, then NATO and as a British Military Attaché to Moscow, awarded the Order of the British Empire (OBE), and who had four children with his wife, Marion Erica Gascoigne (1907 - 2003).

Chamier was part of the old Huguenot protestant family, the 'DesChamps Chamier' (although it is believed he was a Catholic).

Edward Chamier was the son of Major-General Francis Edward Archibald Chamier (1833–1923), who was a Persian interpreter to General Sir James Outram during the Indian Mutiny. He took part in the relief of Lucknow (1857), later achieving the rank of Major-General in the Indian Staff Corps. He was knighted in 1916, appointed a Knight Commander of the Order of the Indian Empire (KCIE) in the 1924 Birthday Honours and a Knight Commander of the Order of the Star of India (KCSI) in the 1934 New Year Honours, and he received the Indian Mutiny Medal. His first wife was Annie Maria Caroline Johnstone (1838–1875).
