= David Ezra Reuben =

9th Chief Justice of Patna High Court

Justice David Ezra Reuben

9th Chief Justice of Patna High Court
- In office 1 June 1952 – 2 September 1953
- Appointed by: Rajendra Prasad
- Preceded by: Pandit Lakshami Kant Jha
- Succeeded by: Syed Jafar Imam

Judge of Patna High Court
- In office 14 August 1943 – 31 May 1952
- Appointed by: George VI

Personal details
- Occupation: Judge, civil servant
- Known for: First Bene Israel member to serve in the Indian Civil Service

David Ezra Reuben was an Indian Judge, served as the Chief Justice of the Patna High Court. He was a member of the Bene Israel Jewish community of India and was the only member of the community to serve in the Indian Civil Service.

== Career ==
Reuben secured first place in the Indian Civil Service in 1917. He became a judge of the Patna High Court on 14 August 1943 and also became the Chief Justice of the Patna High Court on 1 June 1952, succeeding Justice Lakshami Kant Jha. He held the office until 2 September 1953.
