= Aftab Alam (judge) =

Indian judge (born 1948)

Judge of the Supreme Court of India
- In office 12 November 2007 – 18 April 2013

Acting Chief Justice of Jammu and Kashmir High Court
- In office 7 June 2007 – 10 November 2007

Judge of Jammu and Kashmir High Court
- In office 7 June 2007 – 11 November 2007

Judge of Patna High Court
- In office 27 July 1990 – 6 June 2007

Personal details
- Born: Syed Aftab Alam; April 19, 1948 (age 78) Patna, Bihar, India
- Children: Shahrukh Alam

Aftab Alam (born 19 April 1948) is a retired judge of the Supreme Court of India.

== Early life ==
Alam was born in 1948 in Sheikhpura district, Bihar. He studied in Patna Collegiate School.

== Career ==
After passing Law he was enrolled as an Advocate and practiced on Criminal, labour and Constitutional matters at the Patna High Court. Alam was designated a Senior Advocate at the age of 36. He became Additional Standing Counsel of the Government of India in the High Court on 7 September 1981 and served up to 6 September 1985. On 27 July 1990, Alam was elevated as a permanent Judge of the Patna High Court. He was transferred to Jammu and Kashmir High Court as acting chief justice 6 June 2007.

On 12 November 2007, he became the justice of the Supreme Court of India. After the retirement on 18 April 2013, Alam was appointed in the post of Chairperson of the Telecom Disputes Settlement and Appellate Tribunal. Besides his legal career, he is an eminent scholar of classical Urdu having knowledge in Persian Poetry and Sufism.
