= K. S. Paripoornan =

Indian jurist and lawyer (1932–2016)

The Honourable Justice K S Paripoornan

Justice of the Supreme Court of India
- In office 11 June 1994 – 11 June 1997

25th Chief Justice of Patna High Court
- In office 24 January 1994 – 11 June 1994
- Preceded by: Bimal Chandra Basak
- Succeeded by: Konduswami Venkataswamy

Personal details
- Born: Krishnaswami Sundara Paripoornan; 12 June 1932 Trivandrum, Kerala, India
- Died: 3 February 2016 (aged 83) Kochi, Kerala, India

Krishnaswami Sundara Paripoornan (12 June 1932 – 3 February 2016) was an Indian jurist, lawyer and judge of the Supreme Court of India from 1994 to 1997, who was known for his landmark judgements regarding the devaswom boards in Kerala.

Paripoornan was born in 1932 in Trivandrum in the state of Kerala. His father, Krishnaswami Ayyangar, was also a renowned lawyer. Paripoornan graduated with a law degree from Madras Law College, and working in his father's practice, enrolled as an advocate in the High Court of Travancore-Cochin in June 1956. The court became Kerala High Court later that year, and Paripoornan practiced there specialising in civil, taxation and general matters. From 1966 to 1980, he worked as a government counsel at the Kerala High Court.

On 1 January 1994, Paripoornan was announced as Chief Justice of the Patna High Court, and commenced the role on 24 January. Just under five months later on 11 June 1994, he was elevated to a Justice of the Supreme Court of India where he remained until his retirement three years later in June 1997.

In 2007, Justice Paripoornan was appointed head of a special commission looking into the revenue arrangements of the devaswom boards in Kerala, following allegations of corruption and malpractice in the Travancore Devaswom Board and its management of temples in Kerala. Paripoornan was critical of the board's political appointments and requested that the government require minimum educational and qualification standards for appointment to the administration of the temples.

Paripoornan died at the age of 83 at a private hospital in Kochi on 3 February 2016 from multiple organ failure.
