= Shiva Kirti Singh =

Indian judge (born 1951)

Chairperson of Telecom Disputes Settlement and Appellate Tribunal
- In office 21 April 2017 – 13 March 2022
- Appointed by: Appointments Committee of the Cabinet
- Preceded by: Justice Aftab Alam
- Succeeded by: Justice Dhirubhai Naranbhai Patel

Judge of the Supreme Court of India
- In office 19 September 2013 – 11 November 2016
- Nominated by: P. Sathasivam
- Appointed by: Pranab Mukherjee

Chief Justice of the Allahabad High Court
- In office 4 February 2013 – 18 September 2013
- Nominated by: Altamas Kabir
- Appointed by: Pranab Mukherjee

Chief Justice of Allahabad High Court
- Acting
- In office 20 November 2012 – 3 February 2013
- Appointed by: Pranab Mukherjee

Judge of the Allahabad High Court
- In office 17 October 2012 – 19 November 2012
- Nominated by: Altamas Kabir
- Appointed by: Pranab Mukherjee

Judge of the Patna High Court
- In office 29 December 1998 – 16 October 2012
- Nominated by: Adarsh Sein Anand
- Appointed by: Kocheril Raman Narayanan

Personal details
- Born: 13 November 1951 (age 74)
- Relations: B. P. Sinha (Maternal grandfather); B. P. Singh (Cousin); A. K. Singh (Nephew)
- Parent: Shambhu Prasad Singh
- Education: Patna Law College

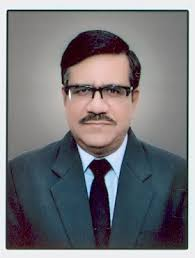
Mr. Shiva Kirti Singh

Shiva Kirti Singh (born 13 November 1951) is a retired Indian judge who served as the chairperson of Telecom Disputes Settlement and Appellate Tribunal. He previously served as a judge of the Supreme Court of India from 2013 to 2016. He has also served as Chief Justice of the Allahabad High Court, acting Chief Justice of the Allahabad High Court and Patna High Court and judge of the Allahabad High Court and Patna High Court. His father Shambhu Prasad SIngh retired as the senior most judge of Patna High Court in January 1979. Former Chief Justice of India Bhuvaneshwar Prasad Sinha is his maternal grandfather.
