= Thomas Fredrick Dawson Miller =

British Indian Judge

Thomas Frederick Dawson Miller KC

2nd Chief Justice of Patna High Court
- In office 31 October 1917 – 30 March 1928
- Appointed by: George V
- Preceded by: Edward Chamier
- Succeeded by: Courtney Terrell

Personal details
- Born: 1867 England
- Died: 1931 (aged 63–64)
- Education: Trinity College, Cambridge
- Profession: Barrister, Judge

Thomas Frederick Dawson Miller KC (1867 – 1931) was a British Indian Judge and barrister who served as the second Chief Justice of the Patna High Court from 1917 to 1928.

== Career ==
Miller was born in England in 1867. He was educated at Trinity College, Cambridge, before being called to the bar at the Inner Temple in 1891. He was appointed King's Counsel in 1912. In October 1917, Miller became the Chief Justice of the Patna High Court and held the office until his retirement in March 1928. He is the longest serving Chief Justice of this High Court. During his tenure, Miller was known for asserting strict judicial independence from the colonial administration. In a widely reported incident asserting the authority of the judiciary, Miller barred high-ranking executive even, Charles Hardinge, 1st Baron Hardinge of Penshurst, the Viceroy of India and the Lieutenant-Governor of Bihar and Orissa from entering court premises without following formal judicial protocol. He was knighted as a Knight Bachelor in 1918.
