= Surjit Singh Sandhawalia =

19th Chief Justice of Patna High Court

19th Chief Justice of Patna High Court
- In office 29 November 1983 – 27 July 1987
- Nominated by: Y. V. Chandrachud
- Appointed by: Zail Singh
- Preceded by: K. B. N. Singh
- Succeeded by: Bhagwati Prasad Jha

12th Chief Justice of Punjab & Haryana High Court
- In office 17 July 1978 – 28 November 1983
- Nominated by: Y. V. Chandrachud
- Appointed by: Neelam Sanjiva Reddy
- Preceded by: Anand Dev Koshal
- Succeeded by: Prem Chand Jain

Judge of Punjab & Haryana High Court
- In office 28 May 1968 – 16 July 1978
- Nominated by: M. Hidayatullah
- Appointed by: Zakir Husain

Personal details
- Born: 27 July 1925 Lyallpur, Punjab Province, British India
- Died: 16 November 2007 (aged 82)
- Children: Gurmeet Singh Sandhawalia
- Education: B. A. (Hons.), LL. B.

Surjit Singh Sandhawalia (27 July 1925 – 16 November 2007) was an Indian jurist who served as chief justice of the Punjab & Haryana High Court from July 1978 to November 1983 and of the Patna High Court from 1983 to 1987. Sandhawalia was the acting Governor for the state of Haryana during 1979–80. He was also the acting Governor of Punjab in February 1983.

== Education ==
Sandhawalia was born on 27 July 1925 in Lyallpur, now known as Faisalabad, in present-day Pakistan. He completed his Bachelor of Arts (Honours) and Bachelor of Laws (LL.B.) degrees before entering the legal profession. He enrolled as an advocate with the Bombay High Court in 1948 and with the Punjab High Court in 1952.

== Career ==
Sandhawalia was appointed as an Additional Judge of the Punjab and Haryana High Court on 28 May 1968 along with Anand Dev Koshal, who later became judge of Supreme Court of India. He became a permanent judge of the same High Court on 16 July 1971, serving in that capacity until July 1978.

On 17 July 1978, Sandhawalia was appointed as the Chief Justice of the Punjab and Haryana High Court, succeeding Chief Justice Anand Dev Koshal, who was elevated to Supreme Court of India. He held the position until 28 November 1983. On 29 November 1983, he was transferred as Chief Justice of the Patna High Court. He served in this position until his retirement on 27 July 1987.

== As Governor ==
Sandhawalia served as Acting Governor of Haryana from 10 December 1979 to 27 February 1980 succeeding Harcharan Singh Brar and succeeded by Ganpatrao Devji Tapase. He also served as Acting Governor of Punjab from 7 February 1983 to 21 February 1983 succeeding Marri Chenna Reddy and succeeded by Anant Sharma.

== Death ==
Sandhawalia died on 16 November 2007 and was survived by his son Gurmeet Singh Sandhawalia, who is also a judge and currently serving as Chief Justice of Himachal Pradesh High Court as on October 2026.
