= Courtney Terrell =

British Indian judge

Sir Courtney Terrell

3rd Chief Justice of Patna High Court
- In office 31 March 1928 – 6 May 1938
- Appointed by: George V
- Preceded by: Thomas Miller
- Succeeded by: Arthur Trevor Harries; Syed Fazl Ali (acting)

Personal details
- Born: 1881
- Died: 17 May 1938 (aged 56–57)
- Children: Richard Terrell
- Parent(s): Thomas Terrell and Emma Terrell

Sir Courtney Terrell (1881—17 May 1938) was a British Indian Judge and former Chief Justice of the Patna High Court.

== Career ==
Terrell was born in 1881, the eldest son of Thomas Terrell, KC and Emma Terrell. He was appointed as the Chief Justice of Patna High Court on 31 March 1928 and stayed in the post for ten years almost until his death. Sir Courtney Terrell was known and respected for his legal decisions and his love of the Indian people. Terrell visited Japan during his judgeship. He died in 1938 from abdominal cancer. His son Richard Terrell wrote a book The Chief Justice describing his life in British India.
