= B. P. Singh (judge) =

Indian judge (born 1942)

Hon'ble Justice (Retd.) Bisheshwar Prasad Singh

Judge of Supreme Court of India
- In office 14 December 2001 – 8 July 2007
- Nominated by: S. P. Bharucha
- Appointed by: K. R. Narayanan

32nd Chief Justice of Bombay High Court
- In office 31 March 2000 – 13 December 2001
- Nominated by: A. S. Anand
- Appointed by: K. R. Narayanan
- Preceded by: Y. K. Sabharwal
- Succeeded by: C. K. Thakker

Judge of Patna High Court
- In office 9 September 1991 – 30 March 2000
- Nominated by: Ranganath Misra
- Appointed by: R. Venkataraman
- In office 9 March 1987 – 8 April 1990
- Nominated by: R. S. Pathak
- Appointed by: Zail Singh

Judge of Karnataka High Court
- In office 9 April 1990 – 8 September 1991
- Nominated by: Sabyasachi Mukharji
- Appointed by: R. Venkataraman

Personal details
- Born: July 9, 1942 (age 84) Bihar, British India
- Relations: B. P. Sinha (grandfather); S. K. Singh (cousin); A. K. Singh (nephew)
- Parent: Rameshwar Prasad Sinha
- Education: B. A. (Hons.), LL. B.
- Alma mater: St. Xavier's High School, Patna; St. Columba's School, Delhi; Hindu College, Delhi; Delhi University

Bisheshwar Prasad Singh (born 9 July 1942) is an Indian retired judge and a former Judge of Supreme Court of India.

== Early life ==
Singh was born in 1942 in a Rajput Judge's family in Arrah. He is the grandson of Bhuvaneshwar Prasad Sinha, 6th Chief Justice of India and his father Rameshwar Prasad Singh was a judge of the Patna High Court. He studied at St. Xavier's High School, Patna and St. Columba's School, Delhi. He passed Senior Cambridge examination with first Division in 1958 and entered into Hindu College, Delhi. Singh completed his graduation from Delhi University in 1961 and became the topper of the University. In 1963 he passed Law from Delhi University.

== Career ==
He was enrolled as an Advocate in October 1963 and started practice in the Supreme Court of India on Civil, Criminal and Constitutional matters. He became the additional Judge of Patna High Court on 9 March 1987. Singh was transferred to the Karnataka High Court in 1990. On 9 September 1991 he was re transferred to Patna High Court again. On 31 March 2000 Justice Singh was appointed the Chief Justice of Bombay High Court. He was elevated as Judge of the Supreme Court of India on 14 December 2001. On 8 July 2007 he retired from the post.
