= B.M. Lal =

Indian judge and administrator (died 2001)

29th Chief Justice of Patna High Court
- In office 9 July 1997 – 6 October 1999
- Preceded by: D. P. Wadhwa
- Succeeded by: Ravi S. Dhavan

Governor of Bihar
- In office 15 March 1999 – 5 October 1999
- Preceded by: Sunder Singh Bhandari
- Succeeded by: Suraj Bhan

Personal details
- Born: c. 1937
- Died: 24 January 2001 (aged 63) New Delhi, India

B. M. Lal (c. 1937 – 24 January 2001) was an Indian judge and administrator who served as the Chief Justice of Patna High Court and as acting Governor of Bihar.

Lal died in New Delhi on 24 January 2001, at the age of 63.
