= B. N. Agrawal =

Indian judge

Justice Biswanath Agrawal

17th Chief justice of Odisha High Court
- In office 18 November 1999 – 18 October 2000
- Preceded by: Sailendu Nath Phukan
- Succeeded by: N. Y. Hanumanthappa

Personal details
- Born: 15 October 1944

Biswanath N. Agrawal (born 15 October 1944) is a retired judge of the Supreme Court of India. He started his judicial service as a judge at Patna High Court in November 1986. Later, he was promoted as the Chief Justice at Orissa High Court in November 1999. He got to the Supreme Court of India as a judge on October 19, 2000 and retired in 2009. He opposed National Judicial Commission legislation in 2014 that could move judges from one state to other. He said:

“If Judiciary is finished, democracy will be finished. This bill (National Judicial Appointments Commission) affects the independence of the judiciary, there is no doubt about it. The way Governors are being transferred to Mizoram, the Chief Justices and judges of the HCs will be transferred to newly created HCs in North East. No judge will be able to pass strong orders."

— The EconomicTimes

== Career ==
Agrawal was born in 1944. He passed LL.B. and started practice in the Patna High Court in 1996. He worked mainly in Civil and Constitutional matters. He was appointed a judge of Patna High Court on 17 November 1986. Agarwal became the Chief Justice of Orissa High Court in November 1999. Thereafter he was elevated to the post of the Justice of Supreme Court of India on 19 October 2000.
