= Patna High Court =

High Court of Patna

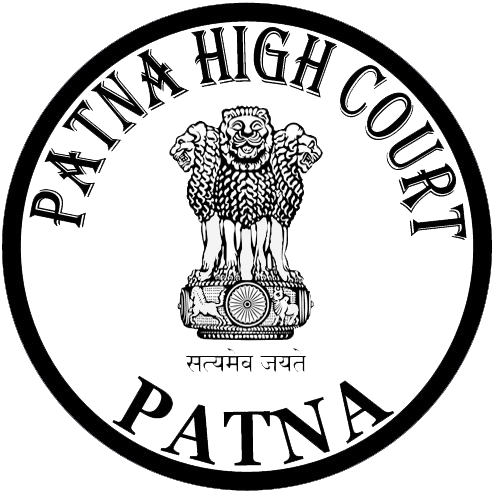
- Emblem of the Patna High Court

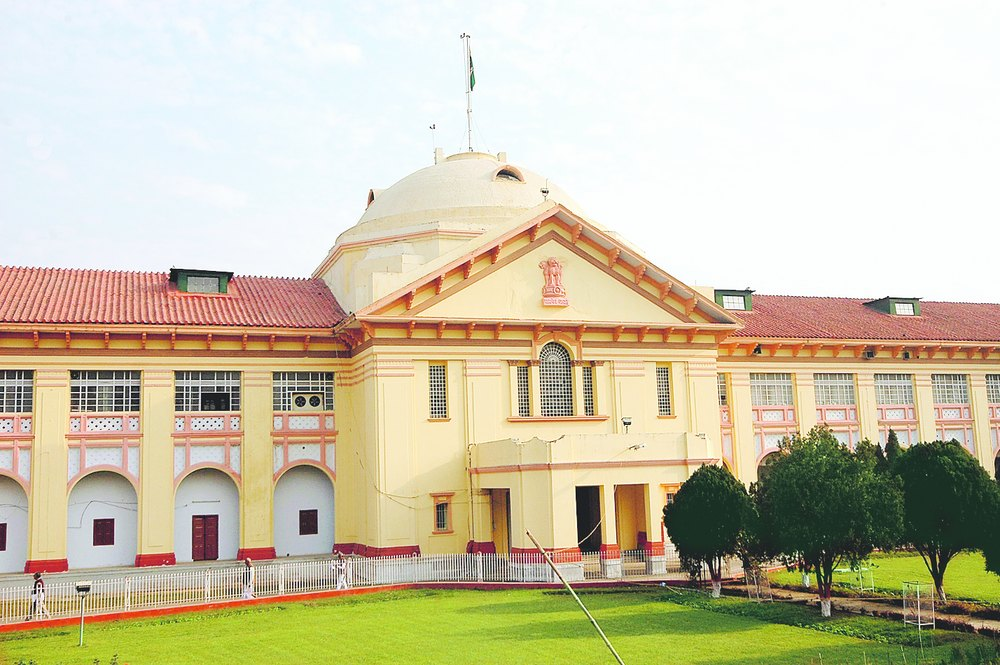
- Interactive map of Patna High Court
- 25°36′32″N 85°7′32″E
- Established: 9 February 1916; 110 years ago
- Jurisdiction: Bihar
- Location: Patna, Bihar, India
- Coordinates: 25°36′32″N 85°7′32″E
- Composition method: Presidential assent on advice of the Chief Justice of India with consultation of Governor of Bihar
- Authorised by: Constitution of India
- Judge term length: mandatory retirement by age of 62
- Number of positions: 53
- Website: patnahighcourt.gov.in

Chief Justice
- Currently: V. Kameswar Rao
- Since: 13 September 2026

The High Court of Judicature at Patna (commonly known as Patna High Court) is the High Court of the state of Bihar, India. It was established on 3 February 1916 by the British colonial government and was later affiliated under the Government of India Act 1915, making it one of the oldest High Courts of India.

The court is based in Patna, the administrative capital of the state of Bihar.

== History of the court ==
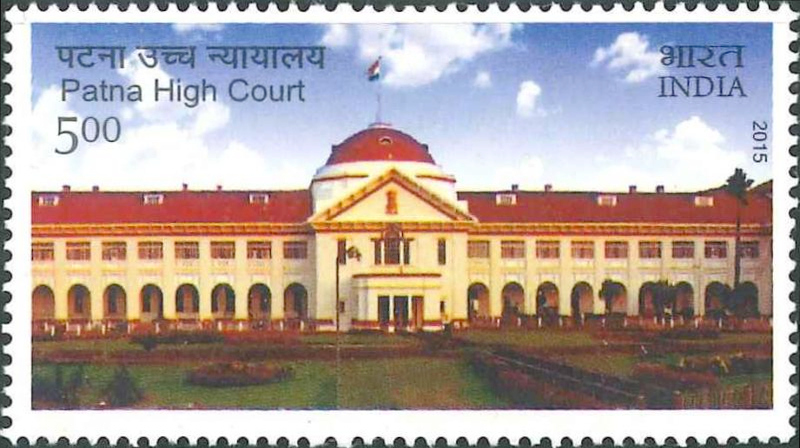
A 2015 stamp dedicated to the 100th anniversary of the Patna High Court

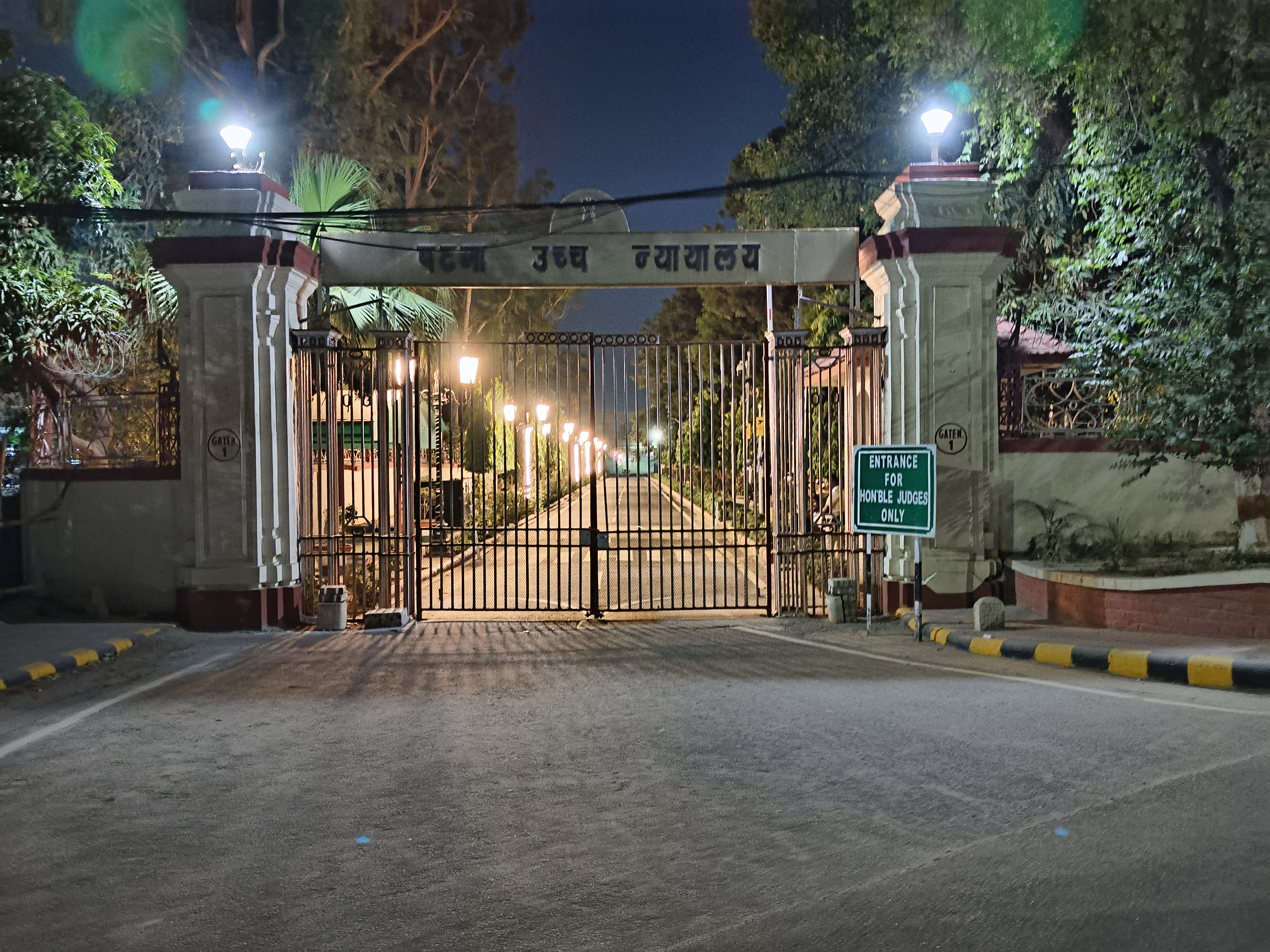
Gate No. 1 of Patna High Court at night

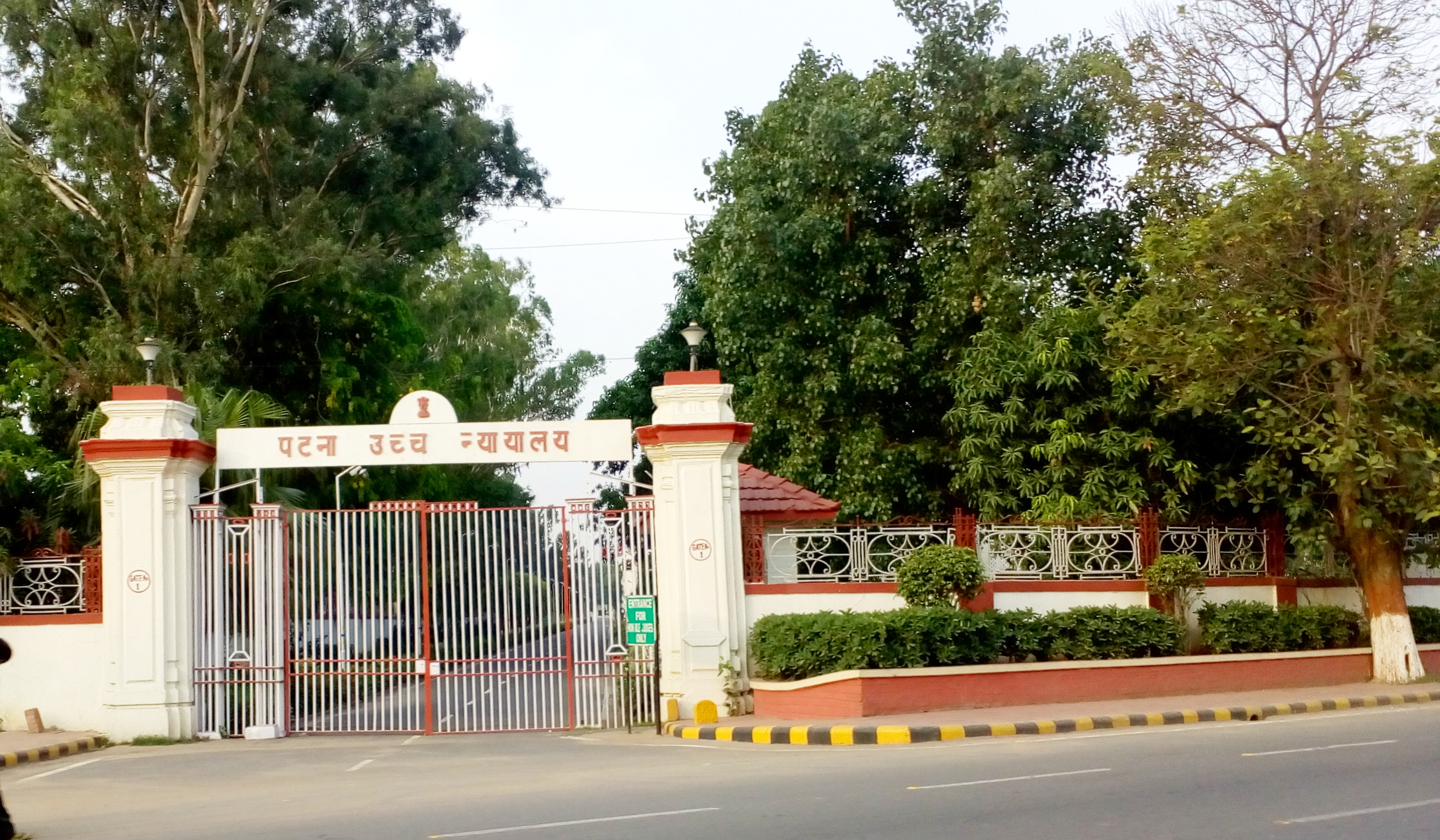
Gate No. 1 of Patna High Court

A proclamation for setting up the court was issued by the governor-general of India on 22 March 1912. The foundation-stone of the High Court Building was laid on 1 December 1913 by Viceroy and Governor-General of India Sir Charles Hardinge of Penshurst. The Patna High Court building on its completion was formally opened by the same viceroy on 3 February 1916. Official work commenced on 1 March 1916. Sir Edward Maynard Des Champs Chamier was the first chief justice of the court.

In 1948, the Patna High Court exercised jurisdiction over the territories of the province of Bihar & Orissa until 26 July 1948, when a separate high court was constituted for Orissa. The Patna High Court opened a circuit bench at Ranchi in 1972. In 1976, the circuit bench of the Patna High Court at Ranchi became a permanent bench. In November 2000, under the Bihar Reorganisation Act, 2000, the circuit bench of the Patna High Court at Ranchi became the Jharkhand High Court.

Starting 18 April 2015, the Patna High Court planned a year-long centenary celebration of 100 years of establishment, and the occasion was inaugurated by the president of India, Pranab Mukherjee, and was chaired by the governor of Bihar, Keshari Nath Tripathi; the chief justice of India, H. L. Dattu; and the chief justice of the Patna High Court, L. Narasimha Reddy.

== Prominent judges of the Patna High Court ==
- Hon. Ms. Justice Rekha Doshit was the chief justice of the Patna High Court and the first woman to hold this office.
- Hon. Sir Edward Maynard Des Champs Chamier is the first chief justice of the Patna High Court.
- Hon. Pandit Lakshami Kant Jha was the first Indian chief justice of the Patna High Court after independence.
- Hon. Mrs. Justice Indu Prabha Singh, the first lady judge of the Patna High Court, holds the distinction of being the first woman judge to hold court at the Patna High Court and its Ranchi Bench.
- Hon. Mrs. Justice Gyan Sudha Misra, the second lady judge of the Patna High Court, is the first woman judge of the Supreme Court of India from Bihar.
- The high court has given two chief justices of India.
  - Hon. Mr. Justice Bhuvneshwar Prasad Sinha, the 6th chief justice of India.
  - Hon. Mr. Justice Lalit Mohan Sharma, the 24th chief justice of India.

== Chief Justice and Judges ==
The following are serving as the judges of the court.

== Former chief justices ==
The following have served as chief justices of the court.

#	Portrait	Chief justice	From	To	Remarks
1		Edward Maynard Des Champs Chamier	1 March 1916	30 October 1917	
2		Thomas Fredrick Dawson Miller	31 October 1917	31 March 1928	
3		Courtney Terrell	31 March 1928	6 May 1938	
4		Arthur Trevor Harries	10 October 1938	19 January 1943	
5		Saiyid Fazl Ali	19 January 1943	14 October 1946	
6		Clifford Monmohan Agarwala	9 January 1948	24 January 1950	
7		Herbert Ribton Meredith	25 January 1950	8 April 1950	
8		Pandit Lakshami Kant Jha	8 April 1950	1 June 1952	
9		David Ezra Reuben	1 June 1952	2 September 1953	
10		Syed Jafar Imam	3 September 1953	10 January 1955	
11		Sudhansu Kumar Das	10 January 1955	30 April 1956	
12		Vaidyanathier Ramaswami	30 April 1956	4 January 1965	
13		Ramaswamy Laxman Narasimham	4 January 1965	2 August 1968	
14		Satish Chandra Mishra	9 November 1968	5 September 1970	
15		Ujjal Narayan Sinha	5 September 1970	29 September 1972	
16		Nand Lall Untwalia	29 September 1972	3 October 1974	
17		Shyam Nandan Prasad Singh	3 October 1974	1 May 1976	
18		Krishna Ballabh Narayan Singh	19 July 1976	12 March 1982	
19		Surjit Singh Sandhawalia	29 November 1983	27 July 1987	
20		Bhagwati Prasad Jha	2 January 1988	2 January 1988	
21		Dipak Kumar Sen	1 May 1988	1 May 1989	
22		Shushil Kumar Jha	19 October 1989	23 October 1989	
23		Gangadhar Ganesh Sohani	24 October 1989	17 December 1990	
24		Bimal Chandra Basak	18 March 1991	21 October 1994	
25		Krishnaswami Sundara Paripoornan	24 January 1994	11 June 1994	
26		Konduswami Venkataswamy	19 September 1994	6 March 1995	
27	G. B. Pattanaik	Gopal Ballav Pattanaik	19 May 1995	11 September 1995	
28		Devinder Pratap Wadhwa	29 September 1995	21 March 1997	
29		Brij Mohan Lal	9 July 1997	6 October 1999	
30		Ravi Swaroop Dhavan	25 January 2000	22 July 2004	
31		Jitendrakumar Nanalal Bhatt	18 July 2005	16 October 2007	
32		Rajesh Balia	5 January 2008	3 March 2008	
33	R. M. Lodha	Rajendra Mal Lodha	13 May 2008	16 December 2008	
34		Jacob Benjamin Koshy	16 March 2009	12 May 2009	
35		Prafulla Kumar Mishra	12 August 2009	16 September 2009	
36	Dipak Misra	Dipak Misra	23 December 2009	24 June 2010	Elevated to Supreme Court on 10 October 2011. Took oath as Chief Justice of India on 28 August 2017
37		Rekha Manharlal Doshit	21 June 2010	13 December 2014	Transferred from Gujarat High Court
38		Lingala Narasimha Reddy	2 January 2015	31 July 2015	
39		Iqbal Ahmed Ansari	29 August 2016	28 October 2016	
40		Rajendra Menon	15 March 2017	8 August 2018	Transferred from Madhya Pradesh High Court. Transferred to Delhi High Court as its Chief Justice
41		Mukesh Rasikbhai Shah	12 August 2018	1 November 2018	Transferred from Gujarat High Court. Elevated to Supreme Court of India
42		Amreshwar Pratap Sahi	17 November 2018	10 November 2019	Transferred from Allahabad High Court. Transferred to Madras High Court as its Chief Justice
43		Sanjay Karol	11 November 2019	5 February 2023	Transferred from Tripura High Court. Elevated to Supreme Court of India
44		Krishnan Vinod Chandran	27 March 2023	15 January 2025	Transferred from Kerala High Court. Elevated to Supreme Court of India
45		Vipul Manubhai Pancholi	21 July 2025	28 August 2025	Transferred from Gujarat High Court. Elevated to Supreme Court of India
46		Pavankumar Bhimappa Bajanthri	21 September 2025	22 October 2025	Transferred from Gujarat High Court
47		Sangam Kumar Sahoo	7 January 2026	4 June 2026	Transferred from Orissa High Court
48		Meenakshi Madan Rai	5 June 2026	11 July 2026	Transferred from Sikkim High Court
49		V. Kameswar Rao	13 September 2026		Transferred from Delhi High Court

== Judges elevated as Chief Justices ==
This sections contains list of only those judges elevated as chief justices whose parent high court is Patna. This includes those judges who, at the time of appointment as chief justice, may not be serving in Patna High Court but this list does not include judges who at the time of appointment as chief justice were serving in Patna High Court but does not have Patna as their Parent High Court.

Colour Key

- Female Chief Justice
- Served as Chief Justice of India

Symbol Key

- ^{‡} Elevated to Supreme Court of India
- ^{RES} Resigned
- ^{†} Died in office

Name	Image	Appointed as CJ in HC of	Date of appointment		Date of retirement (Note: this includes date of resignation, death and elevation to supreme court)	Tenure		Ref..
Name	Image	Appointed as CJ in HC of	As Judge	As Chief Justice	Date of retirement	As Chief Justice	As Judge (Note: also includes tenure as Chief Justice)	Ref..
Saiyid Fazl Ali		Patna	11 April 1928	19 January 1943	14 October 1946^{[‡]} (Note: Elevated to Federal Court of India on 9 June 1947 after retiring as High Court Judge on 14 October 1946)	3 years, 269 days	18 years, 187 days	
Clifford Monmohan Agarwala		Patna	11 July 1933	9 January 1948	24 January 1950^{[RES]}	2 years, 16 days	16 years, 198 days	
Herbert Ribton Meredith		Patna	1 October 1940	25 January 1950	7 April 1950	73 days	9 years, 189 days	
Bhuvaneshwar Prasad Sinha		Nagpur	19 January 1943	24 February 1951	2 December 1954^{[‡]}	3 years, 282 days	11 years, 318 days	
David Ezra Reuben		Patna	14 August 1943	1 June 1952	2 September 1953	1 year, 94 days	10 years, 20 days	
Syed Jafar Imam		Patna	25 October 1943	3 September 1953	9 January 1955^{[‡]}	1 year, 129 days	11 years, 77 days	
Sudhansu Kumar Das		Patna	4 November 1944	10 January 1955	29 April 1956^{[‡]}	1 year, 111 days	11 years, 178 days	
Bira Kishore Ray		Orissa	23 July 1945	26 July 1948	30 October 1951	3 years, 97 days	6 years, 100 days	
Vaidyanathier Ramaswami		Patna	1 November 1947	30 April 1956	3 January 1965^{[‡]}	8 years, 249 days	17 years, 64 days	
Sarjoo Prasad		Gauhati, transferred to Rajasthan	13 January 1950	10 February 1953	10 October 1961	8 years, 243 days	11 years, 271 days	
Chandreswar Prasad Sinha		Gauhati	16 June 1950	21 February 1959	31 January 1961	1 year, 346 days	10 years, 230 days	
Khaleel Ahmed		Orissa	23 April 1951	18 January 1965	5 April 1967	2 years, 78 days	15 years, 348 days	
Satish Chandra Mishra		Patna	11 December 1952	9 November 1968	4 September 1970	1 year, 300 days	17 years, 268 days	
Ujjal Narayan Sinha		Patna	29 October 1957	5 September 1970	28 September 1972	2 years, 24 days	14 years, 336 days	
Nand Lall Untwalia		Patna	2 January 1958	29 September 1972	2 October 1974^{[‡]}	2 years, 4 days	16 years, 274 days	
Shyam Nandan Prasad Singh		Patna	1 December 1959	3 October 1974	30 April 1976	1 year, 211 days	16 years, 152 days	
Krishna Ballabh Narayan Singh		Patna, transferred to Madras	15 November 1966	19 July 1976	24 January 1984	7 years, 190 days	17 years, 71 days	
Bhagwati Prasad Jha		Patna	12 April 1973	2 January 1988	2 January 1988	1 day	14 years, 266 days	
Hari Lal Agrawal		Orissa	12 April 1973	1 May 1986	31 July 1989	3 years, 92 days	16 years, 111 days	
Shushil Kumar Jha		Patna, transferred to Madhya Pradesh	12 April 1973	19 October 1989	15 December 1993	4 years, 50 days	20 years, 248 days	
Nagendra Prasad Singh		Calcutta	12 April 1973	4 February 1991	14 June 1992^{[‡]}	1 year, 132 days	19 years, 64 days	
Prabha Shankar Mishra		Andhra Pradesh, transferred to Calcutta	18 November 1982	15 May 1995	15 July 1998^{[RES]}	3 years, 62 days	15 years, 240 days	
Uday Pratap Singh		Kerala	15 February 1984	23 July 1996	19 December 1997	1 year, 150 days	13 years, 308 days	
Biswanath Agrawal		Orissa	17 November 1986	18 November 1999	18 October 2000^{[‡]}	336 days	13 years, 337 days	
Bisheshwar Prasad Singh		Bombay	9 March 1987	31 March 2000	13 December 2001^{[‡]}	1 year, 258 days	14 years, 280 days	
Satyabrata Sinha		Andhra Pradesh, transferred to Delhi	9 March 1987	11 December 2000	2 October 2002^{[‡]}	1 year, 296 days	15 years, 208 days	
Binod Kumar Roy		Punjab & Haryana, transferred to Gauhati then to Sikkim	31 October 1988	14 October 2002	26 December 2006	4 years, 74 days	18 years, 57 days	
Sachchidanand Jha		Jammu & Kashmir, transferred to Rajasthan	10 July 1990	4 February 2004	15 June 2007	3 years, 132 days	16 years, 341 days	
Narayan Roy		Rajasthan	2 December 1991	5 January 2008	31 January 2009	1 year, 27 days	17 years, 61 days	
Gyan Sudha Misra		Jharkhand	16 March 1994	13 July 2008	30 April 2010^{[‡]}	1 year, 292 days	16 years, 46 days	
Chandramauli Kumar Prasad		Allahabad	8 November 1994	20 March 2009	7 February 2010^{[‡]}	325 days	15 years, 92 days	
Syed Rafat Alam		Madhya Pradesh, transferred to Allahabad	8 November 1994	20 December 2009	7 August 2012	2 years, 232 days	17 years, 274 days	
Sudhanshu Joshi Mukhopadhaya		Gujarat	8 November 1994	9 December 2009	12 September 2011^{[‡]}	1 year, 278 days	16 years, 309 days	
Shiva Kirti Singh		Allahabad	29 December 1998	4 February 2013	18 September 2013^{[‡]}	227 days	14 years, 264 days	
Navin Sinha		Chhattisgarh, transferred to Rajasthan	11 February 2004	9 April 2015	16 February 2017^{[‡]}	1 year, 314 days	13 years, 6 days	
Navniti Prasad Singh		Kerala	6 March 2006	20 March 2017	6 November 2017	232 days	11 years, 246 days	
Ajay Kumar Tripathi		Chhattisgarh	9 October 2006	7 July 2018	26 March 2019^{[RES]}	263 days	12 years, 169 days	
Ravi Ranjan		Jharkhand	14 July 2008	17 November 2019	19 December 2022	3 years, 33 days	14 years, 159 days	
Chakradhari Sharan Singh		Orissa	5 April 2012	7 February 2024	19 January 2025	348 days	12 years, 290 days	
Ashutosh Kumar		Gauhati	15 May 2014	21 July 2025	Incumbent	1 year, 110 days	12 years, 177 days	

=== Judges appointed as Acting Chief Justice ===
Name	Appointed as ACJ in HC of	Date of appointment as Judge	Period as Acting Chief Justice	Date of retirement	Tenure as ACJ	Tenure as Judge	Remarks	Ref..
Fazl Ali	Patna	11 April 1928	7 May 1938 – 9 Oct 1938	14 October 1946	156 days	18 years, 187 days	--	
C. M. Agarwala	Patna	July 1932	15 Oct 1946 – 8 Jan 1948	24 January 1950^{[RES]}	1 year, 86 days		Became permanent	
Satish Chandra Mishra	Patna	11 December 1952	3 Aug 1968 – 8 Nov 1968	4 September 1970	98 days	17 years, 268 days	Became permanent	
K. B. N. Singh	Patna	15 November 1966	1 May 1976 – 18 Jul 1976	24 January 1984	79 days	17 years, 71 days	Became permanent	
Syed Sarwar Ali	Patna	6 April 1970	13 Mar 1982 – 28 Nov 1983	9 September 1984	298 days	14 years, 157 days	--	
Bhagwati Prasad Jha	Patna	12 April 1973	28 Jul 1987 – 1 Jan 1988	2 January 1988	158 days	14 years, 266 days	Became permanent	
S. K. Jha	Patna	12 April 1973	3 Jan 1988 – 30 Apr 1988	15 December 1993	119 days	20 years, 248 days	--	
S. K. Jha	Patna	12 April 1973	2 May 1989 – 18 Oct 1989	15 December 1993	170 days	20 years, 248 days	Became permanent	
N. P. Singh	Patna	12 April 1973	18 Dec 1990 – 3 Feb 1991	14 June 1992^{[‡]}	48 days	19 years, 64 days	Elevated as CJ of Calcutta	
Uday Pratap Singh	Allahabad	15 February 1984	2 Feb 1996 – 15 Feb 1996	19 December 1997	14 days	13 years, 308 days	--	
B. N. Agrawal	Patna	17 November 1986	7 Oct 1999 – 17 Nov 1999	18 October 2000^{[‡]}	42 days	13 years, 337 days	Elevated as CJ of Orissa	
B. P. Singh	Patna	9 March 1987	18 Nov 1999 – 24 Jan 2000	13 December 2001^{[‡]}	68 days	14 years, 280 days	--	
S. B. Sinha	Calcutta	9 March 1987	18 May 1999 – 4 Dec 1999	2 October 2002^{[‡]}	201 days	15 years, 208 days	--	
Nagendra Rai	Patna	10 July 1990	22 Jul 2004 – 17 Jul 2005	30 January 2006	361 days	15 years, 205 days	--	
G. C. Bharuka	Karnataka	27 July 1990	17 Aug 2001 – 30 Aug 2001	15 June 2003	14 days	12 years, 324 days	--	
Aftab Alam	Jammu & Kashmir	27 July 1990	6 Jun 2007 – 11 Nov 2007	11 November 2007^{[‡]}	159 days	17 years, 108 days	Elevated to Supreme Court	
Narayan Roy	Patna	2 December 1991	16 Oct 2007 – 4 Jan 2008	31 January 2009	81 days	17 years, 61 days	Elevated as CJ of Rajasthan	
C. K. Prasad	Patna	8 November 1994	4 Mar 2008 – 12 May 2008	7 February 2010^{[‡]}	70 days	15 years, 92 days	--	
C. K. Prasad	Patna	8 November 1994	17 Dec 2008 – 15 Mar 2009	7 February 2010^{[‡]}	89 days	15 years, 92 days	Elevated as CJ of Allahabad	
S. R. Alam	Allahabad	8 November 1994	30 Dec 2004 – 10 Jan 2005	7 August 2012	12 days	17 years, 274 days	--	
S. R. Alam	Allahabad	8 November 1994	27 Jan 2007 – 6 Mar 2007	7 August 2012	39 days	17 years, 274 days	--	
S. R. Alam	Allahabad	8 November 1994	9 Mar 2009 – 19 Mar 2009	7 August 2012	11 days	17 years, 274 days	--	
S. J. Mukhopadhaya	Jharkhand	8 November 1994	27 Aug 2004 – 28 Feb 2005	12 September 2011^{[‡]}	186 days	16 years, 309 days	--	
S. J. Mukhopadhaya	Jharkhand	8 November 1994	9 Sep 2005 – 3 Dec 2005	12 September 2011^{[‡]}	86 days	16 years, 309 days	--	
S. J. Mukhopadhaya	Jharkhand	8 November 1994	10 Jun 2006 – 28 Aug 2006	12 September 2011^{[‡]}	80 days	16 years, 309 days	Transferred to Madras	
S. J. Mukhopadhaya	Madras	8 November 1994	10 May 2008 – 18 May 2008	12 September 2011^{[‡]}	9 days	16 years, 309 days	--	
S. J. Mukhopadhaya	Madras	8 November 1994	16 Dec 2008 – 8 Mar 2009	12 September 2011^{[‡]}	83 days	16 years, 309 days	--	
S. K. Singh	Patna	29 December 1998	13 May 2009 – 11 Aug 2009	18 September 2013^{[‡]}	91 days	14 years, 264 days	--	
S. K. Singh	Patna	29 December 1998	17 Sep 2009 – 22 Dec 2009	18 September 2013^{[‡]}	97 days	14 years, 264 days	--	
S. K. Singh	Patna	29 December 1998	24 May 2010 – 20 Jun 2010	18 September 2013^{[‡]}	28 days	14 years, 264 days	--	
S. K. Singh	Allahabad	29 December 1998	20 Nov 2012 – 3 Feb 2013	18 September 2013^{[‡]}	76 days	14 years, 264 days	Became permanent	
Navin Sinha	Chhattisgarh	11 February 2004	9 Oct 2014 – 8 Apr 2015	16 February 2017^{[‡]}	1 year, 314 days	13 years, 6 days	Became permanent	
Ravi Ranjan	Patna	14 July 2008	9 Aug 2018 – 11 Aug 2018	19 December 2022	3 days	14 years, 159 days	--	
Ravi Ranjan	Patna	14 July 2008	2 Nov 2018 – 16 Nov 2018	19 December 2022	15 days	14 years, 159 days	--	
C. S. Singh	Patna	5 April 2012	6 Feb 2023 – 28 Mar 2023	19 January 2025	51 days	12 years, 290 days	--	
Ashutosh Kumar	Patna	15 May 2014	16 Jan 2025 – 20 Jul 2025	Incumbent	186 days	12 years, 177 days	Elevated as CJ of Gauhati	
Sudhir Singh	Patna	15 April 2015	23 Oct 2025 – 6 Jan 2026	Incumbent	76 days	11 years, 207 days	--	
Sudhir Singh	Patna	15 April 2015	12 Jul 2026 – 12 Sep 2026	Incumbent	63 days	11 years, 207 days	--	

== Judges elevated to Supreme Court ==
This section includes the list of only those judges whose parent high court was Patna. This includes those judges who, at the time of elevation to Supreme Court of India, may not be serving in Patna High Court but this list does not include judges who at the time of elevation were serving in Patna High Court but does not have Patna as their Parent High Court.

Colour Key

- Female Judge
- Served as Chief Justice of India

Key

- ^{RES} Resigned
- ^{†} Died in office

#	Name of the Judge	Image	Date of Appointment		Date of Retirement	Tenure			Immediately preceding office
#	Name of the Judge	Image	In Parent High Court	In Supreme Court	Date of Retirement	In High Court(s)	In Supreme Court	Total tenure (Note: Includes both tenure as High Court Judge as well as Supreme Court Judge)	Immediately preceding office
1	Saiyid Fazl Ali		11 April 1928	9 June 1947 (Note: Elevated to the Federal Court of India on 9 June 1947, and became part of the Supreme Court of India after its establishment on 26 January 1950.) (Note: Elevated to Federal Court of India after retirement as High Court Judge on 14 October 1946)	18 September 1951	18 years, 187 days	4 years, 102 days	22 years, 289 days	--
2	Bhuvaneshwar Prasad Sinha		19 January 1943	3 December 1954	31 January 1964	11 years, 318 days	9 years, 60 days	21 years, 13 days	CJ of erstwhile Nagpur HC
3	Syed Jaffer Imam		25 October 1943	10 January 1955	31 January 1964	11 years, 77 days	9 years, 22 days	20 years, 99 days	10th CJ of Patna HC
4	Sudhansu Kumar Das		4 November 1944	30 April 1956	2 September 1963	11 years, 178 days	7 years, 126 days	18 years, 303 days	11th CJ of Patna HC
5	Vaidyanathier Ramaswami		1 November 1947	4 January 1965	30 October 1969	17 years, 64 days	4 years, 300 days	21 years, 364 days	12th CJ of Patna HC
6	Nand Lall Untwalia		2 January 1958	3 October 1974	31 July 1980	16 years, 274 days	5 years, 303 days	22 years, 212 days	16th CJ of Patna HC
7	Lalit Mohan Sharma		12 April 1973	5 October 1987	11 February 1993	14 years, 176 days	5 years, 130 days	19 years, 306 days	Judge of Patna HC
8	Nagendra Prasad Singh		12 April 1973	15 June 1992	24 December 1996	19 years, 65 days	4 years, 193 days	23 years, 257 days	26th CJ of Calcutta HC
9	Biswanath Agrawal		17 November 1986	19 October 2000	15 October 2009	13 years, 337 days	8 years, 362 days	22 years, 333 days	17th CJ of Orissa HC
10	Bisheshwar Prasad Singh		9 March 1987	14 December 2001	8 July 2007	14 years, 280 days	5 years, 207 days	20 years, 122 days	32nd CJ of Bombay HC
11	Satyabrata Sinha		9 March 1987	3 October 2002	8 August 2009	15 years, 208 days	6 years, 341 days	22 years, 153 days	21st CJ of Delhi HC
12	Aftab Alam		27 July 1990	12 November 2007	18 April 2013	17 years, 108 days	5 years, 158 days	22 years, 266 days	Acting CJ of Jammu & Kashmir HC
13	Chandramauli Kumar Prasad		8 November 1994	8 February 2010	14 July 2014	15 years, 92 days	4 years, 157 days	19 years, 249 days	41st CJ of Allahabad HC
14	Gyan Sudha Misra		16 March 1994	30 April 2010	27 April 2014	16 years, 46 days	3 years, 363 days	20 years, 43 days	6th CJ of Jharkhand HC
15	Sudhanshu Joshi Mukhopadhaya		8 November 1994	13 September 2011	14 March 2015	16 years, 309 days	3 years, 183 days	20 years, 219 days	22nd CJ of Gujarat HC
16	Shiva Kirti Singh		29 December 1998	19 September 2013	11 November 2016	14 years, 264 days	3 years, 54 days	17 years, 319 days	44th CJ of Allahabad HC
17	Navin Sinha		11 February 2004	17 February 2017	18 August 2021	13 years, 6 days	4 years, 183 days	17 years, 189 days	34th CJ of Rajasthan HC
18	Ahsanuddin Amanullah		20 June 2011	6 February 2023	Incumbent	11 years, 230 days	3 years, 275 days	15 years, 140 days	Judge of Patna HC

== List of Former Judges (Arranged in alphabetical order) ==
Judge	Source	Term Start	Term End	Tenure	Parent High Court	Remarks
A. K. Ganguly		4 April 1994	3 February 2012			
A. N. Trivedi						
A. B. N. Sinha		6 May 1963	15 September 1970			
A. W. E. Wort, Barrister- at- law						
Abhayapda Mukherji						
Abhijit Sinha			3 November 2008			
Abhiram Singh		18 November 1982	2 March 1988			
Achalendra Nath Mukherji		6 April 1970	1 August 1975			
Aditya Kumar Trivedi		20 June 2011	10 August 2020			
Aditya Narayan Chaturvedi		18 September 1991	18 January 1997			
Aftab Alam		27 July 1990	18 April 2013			
Ahmad Saiyid Anwar		8 November 1965	28 February 1975			
Akhilesh Chandra		15 March 2010	15 March 2015			
Amaresh Kumar Lal		20 June 2011				(Additional Judge)
Amir Das		2 December 1991	1 January 1996			
Anand Prasad Sinha		18 November 1982	10 September 1986			
Ananta Manohar Badar		20 October 2021	9 August 2023			
Anil Kumar Sinha		29 December 1998	8 January 2004			
Anil Kumar Upadhyay		22 May 2017				
Anjana Mishra		15 May 2014				
Anjana Prakash		13 June 2009	17 July 2016			
Anjani Kumar Sharan		17 April 2019	9 April 2025			
Anwar Ahmad		10 May 2006				
Arthur Edgar Scroope		31 January 1927				
Arun Kumar		9 December 2016	21 August 2018			
Arvind Singh Chandel		8 June 2024	31 August 2025			
Arvind Srivastava		9 December 2016	3 April 2024			
Ashok Kumar Verma		16 December 1999	28 January 2004			
Ashoke Kumar Prasad		16 October 1997	10 April 2001			
Ashwani Kumar Singh		20 June 2011	31 October 2022			
Ashwini Kumar Sinha		18 November 1982	11 August 1987			
B. K. Jha		1 March 2002	1 February 2005			
B. K. Roy		31 October 1988	26 December 2006			
B. L. Yadav		28 April 1994	5 April 1996			
B. P. Jamuar		18 July 1949	27 September 1958			
B. N. Agrawal		17 November 1986	15 October 2009			
B. N. Rai		25 January 1950	11 January 1960			
B. N. Sinha		17 November 1986	1 January 1992			
B. N. P. Singh		1 July 2001	18 April 2004			
B. N. Singh		16 March 1994	10 February 2001			
B. P. Singh		9 March 1987	8 July 2007			(Former Judge Supreme Court Of India)
Bageshwari Prasad Griyaghey		18 November 1982	14 August 1986			
Baidyanath Jha		21 March 1967	17 November 1971			
Balmiki Prasad Sinha		21 March 1967	12 January 1971			
Barin Ghosh		7 January 2005	4 June 2014			
Bharat Prasad Sharma		9 May 1996	23 January 2000			
Bhubaneshwan Dhari Singh		5 February 1968	1 November 1977			
Bhuvaneshwar Prasad		13 September 1987	20 October 1991			
Bhuvaneshwar Prasad Pandey		5 March 1945				
Bhuvaneshwar Prasad Sinha		19 January 1943	1 February 1964			
Binodanand Singh		4 December 1981				
Bira Kishore Ray		23 July 1945				
Birendra Prasad Sinha		3 January 1975	15 November 1990			
Birendra Prasad Verma		18 February 2010	16 January 2017			
Brishketu Saran Sinha		10 March 1976	12 January 1985			
C. Aikinson K.C., Barrister - At- Law						
C. H. A. Bennell, Barrister-at-law						
C. M. Prasad		24 March 2003				
C. S. S. Sinha		3 January 1977	15 June 1981			
Chandra Narain Tiwary		12 April 1973	1 August 1979			
Chandra Prakash Singh		4 June 2022	22 December 2025			
Chandramauli Kumar Prasad		8 November 1994	14 July 2014			
Chandreshwar Prasad Sinha						
Chandrika Prasad Sinha		6 April 1970	1 April 1976			
D. N. Prasad		29 December 1998	14 August 2003			
D. H. Kingsford		27 April 1916				I.C.S
D. P. S. Choudhary		29 December 1998	28 March 2002			
Daljeet Singh Dhaliwal		21 July 1994	22 July 1998			
Dharampal Sinha						
Dharnidhar Jha		3 March 2014	7 September 2015			
Dinesh Kumar Singh		18 February 2010	2 October 2020			
Dr. T. Thornhill, Barrister - At- Law						
Dr. Mukundakam Sharma		14 February 1994	18 September 2011			
Durga Prasad Sinha		12 April 1973	1 May 1978			
E. P. Chapman		1 March 1916	26 October 1918			I.C.S.
F. G. Rowland						I.C.S
F. F. Madan		20 July 1936				
F. R. Roe		1 March 1916				I.C.S
Francis George Rowland		23 May 1929	14 February 1944			
G. S. Chaube		9 May 1996	20 July 2000			
G. C. Bharukha		27 July 1990	15 June 2003			
Ghanshyam Prasad		24 January 2005	28 January 2009			
Girija Nandan Prasad		10 November 1960	7 March 1973			
Gobind Mohan Misra		21 July 1976	1 January 1981			
Gopal Prasad		15 March 2010	6 July 2016			
H. F. E. B. Foster		12 November 1919				
H. L. Agarwal		12 April 1973	1 August 1989			
H. L. L. Allanson						I.C.S
Harry Llewellyn Lyons Allanson		11 April 1928				
Hemant Kumar Srivastava		12 August 2010	1 February 2021			
I. P. Singh		10 July 1990	1 September 2007			
J. A. Saunders		11 July 1933				I.C.S
J. G. Shearer		22 July 1940	8 January 1953			
Dr. J.N. Dubey		28 April 1994	15 July 1999			
Jayanandan Singh		9 October 2006	30 September 2014			
Jitendra Mohan Sharma		21 April 2014	1 July 2018			
Jitendra Narain		24 May 1971	1 February 1976			
Jugal Kishore Narayan		22 January 1948				
Jyoti Saran		13 June 2009	18 August 2019			
K. B. Sinha		18 November 1982	1 January 1992			
Kali Kumar Banergi						
Kamla Sahai						
Kamta Kanta Datta		15 November 1965	12 April 1970			
Kanhaijaji		22 April 1968	2 February 1972			
Khan Bahadur Khwaja Mohammad Noor		27 October 1930	28 September 1939			
Kishore Kumar Mandal		10 July 2007	21 January 2018			
Kulwant Sahay		27 November 1922	22 January 1934			
L. C. Adami		12 November 1919	17 March 1931			I.C.S.
L. P. N. Sahadeo		17 November 1986	31 January 1992			
Lalit Mohan Sharma						
Lok Nath Prasad		19 October 1992	19 September 1998			
Madan Mohan Prasad		18 November 1982	13 October 1986			
Madan Mohan Prasad		24 May 1971	16 October 1978			
Madhavendra Saran		10 May 2006				
Mahabir Prasad, Barrister-at-law		12 January 1948				
Mahendra Prasad Verma		11 November 1966	16 October 1971			
Maheshwar Pradesh Verma		8 March 1979	17 November 1987			
Mandhata Singh		9 February 2009	20 November 2013			
Manohar Lal Visa		29 December 1998	28 February 2006			
Manohar Lall		19 July 1937				
Manoranjan Prasad		25 November 1977	1 September 1981			
Medini Prasad Singh		10 March 1976	1 January 1982			
Mihir Kumar Jha		10 July 2007	1 December 2015			
Mridula Mishra		11 February 2004				
Muneshwari Sahay		28 May 1974	23 October 1978			
Mungeshwar Sahoo		15 March 2010	31 October 2017			
N. Pandey		31 October 1988	20 March 2001			
N. S. Rao		13 September 1987	4 January 1994			
Nagendra Prasad Singh		12 April 1973	25 December 1996			Former Judge Supreme Court Of India
Nagendra Rai		10 July 1990				
Nageshwar Prasad		28 January 1949				
Nanumani Prasad Singh		10 July 1990	11 September 1999			
Naqui Imam		30 August 1954				
Narendra Narayan Singh		9 May 1996	15 March 2000			
Naresh Kumar Sinha		19 October 1992	12 April 1999			
Nazir Ahmad		4 December 1981	1 May 1986			
Nilu Agrawal		15 April 2015				
O. N. Asthana		21 February 1994	10 April 1997			
Om Prakash		10 July 1990	8 July 1993			
P. H. L. Brough		19 October 1942	18 September 1943			
P. K. Sinha		16 December 1999	6 March 2005			
P. N. Yadav		2 July 2001	4 January 2005			
P. K. Sarkar		9 May 1996	9 January 2000			
Phani Bhusan Prasad		13 August 1984	5 September 1990			
Prabha Shankar Mishra		18 November 1982	13 August 1998			
Prabhat Kumar Jha		21 April 2014	15 July 2021			
Prafula Kumar Benerji		5 February 1968	24 February 1972			
Prafulla Ranjan Das						
Prakash Chandra Jaiswal		22 May 2017	29 December 2019			
Prakash Chandra Verma		8 April 2011				
Pramod Kumar Sarin		21 February 1994	27 November 1998			
Prasanta Kumar Sen		2 May 1924				
Prasun Kumar Deb		14 February 1994	1 October 2003			
Prem Shanker Sahay		1 December 1978	25 November 1986			
R. B. Beevor		8 November 1943				
R. N. Lall		17 November 1986	2 April 1991			
R. N. Prasad		27 July 1990	4 August 2006			
R. N. Sahay		10 July 1990	21 May 2000			
R. S. Garg		11 November 2001	18 June 2010			
R. J. Bahadur		6 May 1963	11 November 1970			
R. L. Ross		4 November 1920	20 July 1932			
Radha Mohan Prasad		2 December 1991	12 July 2006			
Rai Bahadur Amar Nath Chatterjee		1 December 1928				
Rai Bahadur Jyotirmoy Chatterjee		23 April 1930				
Raj Kishore Prasad		12 May 1955	30 March 1962			
Rajan Gupta		20 October 2021	13 September 2022			
Rajendra Kumar Mishra		20 June 2011	30 September 2021			
Rajendra Prasad		9 September 2002	1 January 2006			
Rajeswar Prasad Mandal		8 March 1979	20 February 1982			
Ram Avtar Sharma		12 December 1997	6 January 2000			
Ram Nandan Prasad						
Ram Naresh Thakur		18 November 1982	2 January 1988			
Ramanandan Prasad		18 November 1982	23 October 1988			
Ramchandra Prasad Sinha		4 December 1981	11 August 1988			
Ramesh Kumar Datta		6 March 2006	1 January 2017			
Rameshwar Prasad Sinha		12 April 1973	11 July 1982			
Ramratna Singh						
Rati Kant Choudhary		31 December 1968				
Rekha Kumari		24 January 2005	8 July 2008			
S. B. Dhavle		3 April 1929				I.C.S.
S. B. Sanyal		18 November 1982	28 September 1991			
S. C. Mookerjee						
S. K. Chattopadhyaya						
S. M. M. Alam		24 January 2005	2 January 2009			
S. N. Jha		18 November 1982	1 January 1991			
S. N. Pathak		16 December 1999	5 February 2003			
S. P. Verma		2 January 1934	11 January 1946			
S. Ali Ahmad		28 May 1974	23 May 1993			
S. B. Sinha						
S. K. Hom Chaudhuri		28 April 1994	1 March 1996			
S. K. Katriar		31 March 1999				
S. K. Mukherjee						
S. N. Mishra		2 December 1991	16 June 2001			
Sadanand Mukherjee		24 January 2005	12 February 2008			
Saiyid Sharfuddin		1 March 1916	10 September 1917			
Samarendra Pratap		9 October 2006	31 July 2017			
Sambhu Prasad Singh		21 March 1967	3 January 1979			
Sanjay Kumar		22 May 2017	21 October 2022			
Sanjay Kumar		9 December 2016	1 January 2019			
Sanjay Priya		9 December 2016	3 September 2019			
Sarjan Prasad Singh						
Sarjoo Prasad		13 January 1950				
Satyeshwar Roy		27 November 1979	5 June 1992			
Seema Ali Khan		9 October 2006				
Shailesh Kumar Sinha		9 October 2006	7 February 2014			
Shamim Ahshan		2 December 1991				
Shamimul Hoda		31 October 1988				
Shashank Kumar Singh		27 July 1990	2 October 2005			
Shiv Anugrah Narain		21 July 1976	28 November 1984			
Shivaji Pandey		20 June 2011	7 May 2021			
Shiveshwar Prasad Sinha		24 May 1971	1 February 1980			
Shyam Kishore Sharma		10 May 2006	7 July 2014			
Shyamnandan Prasad Singh						
Sidheshwar Narayan						
Sir B. K. Mullick		1 March 1916	16 April 1928			I.C.S.
Sir J. F. W. James						I.C.S.
Sir John Francis William James		20 May 1927	3 June 1939			
Sir John Strachey Bucknill		15 November 1920				
Sir Jwala Prasad		1 March 1916				
Sir Saiyid Sultan Ahmad, Kt., Barrister-at-law		9 December 1919				
Sir Syed Ali Imam, Kt.		10 September 1917				
Sir Thomas Stewart Macpherson, Kt.		6 July 1921	20 August 1936			
Subash Chandra Jha		10 May 2006				
Sunil Kumar Choudhuri		28 May 1976	25 June 1986			
Sunil Kumar Panwar		7 October 2021	14 August 2024			
Surinder Sarup		21 July 1994	21 April 2000			
Syed Akbar Husain		24 May 1971				
Syed Haider Shaukat Abidi		1 September 1988	15 July 1993			
Syed Rafat Alam		8 November 1994				
Syed Sarwar Ali		6 April 1970	9 September 1984			
Syed Shah Nayyar Hussain		24 March 2004				
Syed Shamsul Hasan		23 November 1977	8 April 1990			
Syed Wasiuddin						
T. G. N. Ayyar		21 July 1943				
T. Luby		2 July 1934				
T. Meena Kumari		27 October 2010	22 March 2013			
Tarkeshwar Prasad Singh		2 March 2002				
Udai Sinha		31 March 1990				
Umesh Chandra Sharma		8 March 1979	28 May 1983			
V. K. Gupta						
V. N. Sinha		24 March 2004	15 November 2015			
Vidyanand		23 May 1994	24 November 1998			
Vijayendra Nath		20 June 2011	12 August 2017			
Vikash Jain		20 June 2011	17 February 2022			
Vinod Kumar Sinha		9 December 2016	22 April 2020			
Vishwanath Mishra		29 May 1978	2 November 1981			
W. S. Coutts, C.I.E.I.C.S.		13 May 1918				
W. W. Dalziel		22 July 1946				
Yadunath Sharan Singh		4 December 1981	11 October 1987			
