= Central Administrative Tribunal =

Indian quasi-judicial body

- केंद्रीय प्रशासनिक न्यायाधिकरण
- केंद्रीय प्रशासनिक न्यायाधिकरण

Legal Agency overview
- Formed: (1 November 1985)
- Jurisdiction: Government of India
- Headquarters: New Delhi (Principal Bench)
- Motto: "Satyamev Jayte"
- Employees: 65
- Legal Agency executives: Hon'ble Justice Ranjit Vasantrao, (Chairman); Smt. Preeti Singh, (Principal Registrar); SH. JAYESH V. BHAIRAVIA, AHMEDABAD BENCH; ALLAHABAD BENCH, SH. JUSTICE OM PRAKASH; BENGALURU BENCH, MRS. JUSTICE S. SUJATHA
- Parent department: Government of India
- Website: https://cgat.gov.in/

The Central Administrative Tribunal (CAT) is a quasi judicial body set up under the Central Administrative Tribunal Act to resolve the grievances of Central Government employees and State Government employees of India in a speedy and effective way.

== History and objective ==
The Central Administrative Tribunal was set up under Central Administrative Tribunal Act in 1985 with the main aim of resolving the grievances of Central and State Government employees concerning their service matters, as a speedy and effective remedy. Currently, the Central Administrative Tribunal has 19 benches across Indian cities.

== Members ==
The Chairman of Central Administrative Tribunal should be from a judicial background.

The Central Administrative Tribunal has a bench of 70 members with 1 chairperson and 34 members from judicial and 35 members from administrative backgrounds. As per the laws for the functioning of Central Administrative Tribunal, each bench should comprise two members, one from judicial and one administrative background.

=== Chairpersons ===
#	Chief Justice	Assumed office	Left office	Term length	Last office held
1	Justice Amitav Banerji	7 November 1988	4 December 1991	3 years, 27 days	Chief Justice, Allahabad High Court
2	Justice V. S. Malimath	5 December 1991	11 June 1994	2 years, 188 days	Chief Justice, Kerala High Court
3	Justice Satish Chandra Mathur	1 October 1994	7 September 1995	341 days	Chief Justice, Jammu and Kashmir High Court
4	Justice Amratlal Paramananddas Ravani	8 May 1996	4 September 1996	119 days	Chief Justice, Rajasthan High Court
5	Justice Krishna Murari Agarwal	5 February 1997	26 October 1999	2 years, 263 days	Chief Justice, Sikkim High Court
6	Justice Ashok Chhotelal Agarwal	27 October 1999	26 August 2002	2 years, 303 days	Chief Justice, Madras High Court
7	Justice Vinod Sagar Aggarwal	27 August 2002	19 August 2005	2 years, 357 days	Judge, Delhi High Court
–	Justice Basudeb Panigrahi (acting)	20 August 2005	17 January 2006	150 days	Judge, Orissa High Court
8	Justice Basudeb Panigrahi	18 January 2006	18 January 2007	1 year, 0 days	Judge, Orissa High Court
9	Justice Vinod Kumar Bali	8 March 2007	8 March 2012	5 years, 0 days	Chief Justice, Kerala High Court
10	Justice Syed Rafat Alam	8 August 2012	4 April 2016	3 years, 240 days	Chief Justice, Madhya Pradesh High Court
11	Justice Permod Kohli	5 April 2016	5 April 2018	2 years, 0 days	Chief Justice, Sikkim High Court
12	Justice L. Narasimha Reddy	3 July 2018	31 July 2021	3 years, 28 days	Chief Justice, Patna High Court
–	Manjula Das (acting)	1 August 2021	29 July 2022	362 days	Judicial Member, Central Administrative Tribunal Guwahati
13	Justice Ranjit Vasantrao More	30 July 2022	Incumbent	4 years, 3 days	Chief Justice, Meghalaya High Court

== Powers ==
Central Administrative Tribunal, in respect of any of its contempt proceedings, has similar jurisdiction and powers as that of High Court.

== Challenges ==
Central Administrative Tribunal regularly faces staff crunch.

== See also ==
- Tribunals in India.
