= J. B. Koshy =

Jacob Benjamin Koshy
- Born: 13 May 1947 (age 79)

Justice Jacob Benjamin Koshy was born on 13 May 1947 to Mr. Koshy who was then Principal of the Brickfield Higher Secondary School in Malaysia. Justice Koshy is a former chairman of Kerala Human Rights Commission. He was Chief Justice of Patna High Court. Koshy was appointed Acting Chief Justice of the Kerala High Court following the elevation of Chief Justice H.L. Dattu as Supreme Court Judge. Appointed as Permanent Judge in 1996, Mr. Koshy was the Executive Chairman of the Kerala State Legal Services Authority.

== Early life and education ==
Justice J. B. Koshy, completed his early education at the Metropolitan High School, Puthencavu, and passed B.Sc. degree from Mar Ivanios College, Thiruvananthapuram in 1966. He completed his LL.B. and LL.M. degrees from Government Law College, Ernakulam. He obtained his Post graduate (LL.M.) degree in Mercantile Law including Law of Contract from Kerala University.

== Career ==
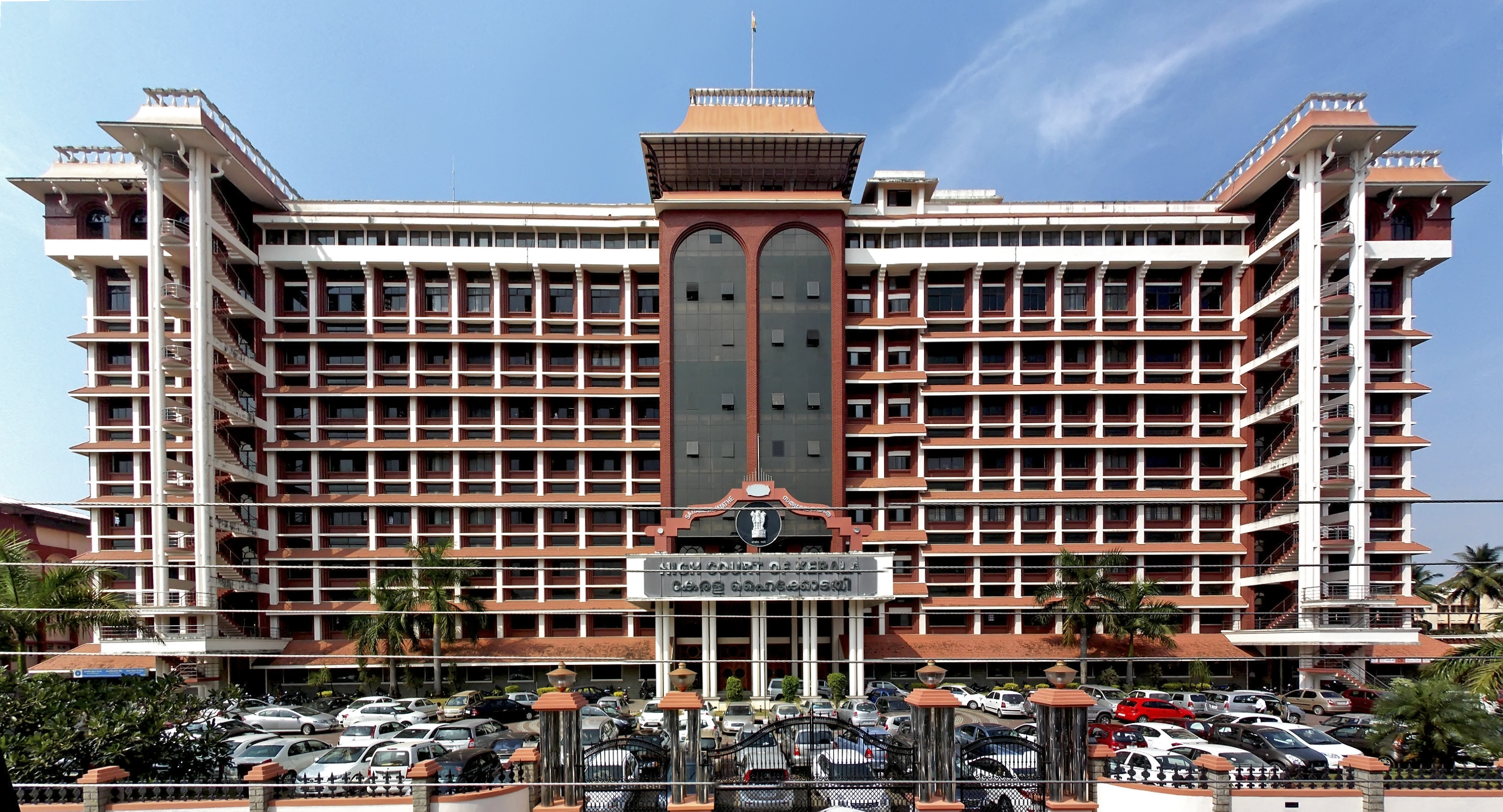
A working day view of Kerala High Court

Koshy was enrolled as Advocate on the 12th October 1968. He practiced in the High Court at Ernakulam, Labour Court, Industrial Tribunal and CEGAT in Constitutional Law, Industrial Law, Customs and Central Excise matters. He worked as Standing Counsel for many Central / State Government undertakings and private sector companies like Tata Tea Limited and Hindustan Lever Limited. He was an Executive Chairman of Kerala State Legal Service Authority (KELSA) from 2006 to 2009, and served as Chairman of the Indian Law Institute, Kerala from 2007 to 2009 and Chairman of the Advisory Boards constituted under the COFEPOSA Act and National Security Act from 2005 to 2009. He was Chancellor of the National University of Advanced Legal Studies, Cochin as Acting Chief Justice of the Kerala High Court and Chancellor of Chanakya National Law University, Patna till retirement as Chief Justice of the Patna High Court. In April 2010, he was appointed Chairman of the Appellate Tribunal for Forfeited Property under the Smugglers and Foreign Exchange Manipulators (Forfeiture of Property) Act and Narcotic Drugs and Psychotropic Substances Act. He took additional charge as Chairman of Appellate Tribunal under the Prevention of Money Laundering Act in May 2010. After resigning the post of chairman, Appellate Tribunal for Forfeited Property, taken charge as Chairperson of Kerala State Human Rights Commission on 5 September 2011.

Former Chairman of the advisory board constituted under the COFEPOSA Act and the National Security Act. Independent Director of Muthoot Finance.
