= Bimal Chandra Basak =

Indian judge (born 1927)

24th Chief Justice of Patna High Court
- In office 18 March 1991 – 21 January 1994
- Preceded by: Gangadhar Ganesh Sohani
- Succeeded by: K. S. Paripoornan

Calcutta High Court
- In office 10 June 1974 – 17 March 1991

Personal details
- Born: 22 January 1932

Bimal Chandra Basak (born 22 January 1932) was an Indian judge and a Chief Justice of Patna High Court.
