= Ujjal Narayan Sinha =

Indian judge

15th Chief Justice of Patna High Court
- In office 5 September 1970 – 29 September 1972
- Preceded by: Satish Chandra Mishra
- Succeeded by: Nand Lall Untwalia

Governor of Bihar
- In office 21 January 1971 – 31 January 1971
- Preceded by: Nityanand Kanungo
- Succeeded by: Dev Kant Baruah

Ujjal Narayan Sinha was an Indian judge and the Chief Justice of Patna High Court from 5 September 1970 to 29 September 1972. He was also the acting Governor of Bihar from 21 January to 31 January 1971.

Sinha was commissioned to produce a report into the December 1975 Chasnala mining disaster which killed 375 miners, the worst mining accident in Indian history. The report was submitted on 24 March 1977.
