= Sudhansu Kumar Das =

Former judge of Supreme Court of India (1956-1963)

Hon'ble Justice (Retd.) Sudhansu Kumar Das

Judge of Supreme Court of India
- In office 30 April 1956 – 2 September 1963
- Nominated by: Sudhi Ranjan Das
- Appointed by: Rajendra Prasad

11th Chief Justice of Patna High Court
- In office 10 January 1955 – 29 April 1956
- Nominated by: M. C. Mahajan
- Appointed by: Rajendra Prasad
- Preceded by: Syed Jafar Imam
- Succeeded by: V. Ramaswami

Judge of Patna High Court
- In office 4 November 1944 – 9 January 1955
- Appointed by: George VI

Personal details
- Born: 3 September 1898
- Died: Not known
- Education: Presidency College, Calcutta (B.A. Honours), London University
- Profession: Judge

Sudhansu Kumar Das (born 3 September 1898 – Not known) or S. K. Das was an Indian jurist and former civil servant who served as a judge of the Supreme Court of India and briefly as Acting Chief Justice of India. He also served as 11th Chief Justice and judge of the Patna High Court

== Early life ==
Das was born on 3 September 1898. He received his early education at Krishnagar Collegiate School, Krishnanagar, Nadia, before attending Presidency College in Calcutta for B.A. (Hons.). After his undergraduate studies, he pursued further education at the University of London. His appeared for the competitive Indian Civil Service (ICS) examination, which he passed in 1921.

== Career ==
Das worked in Bihar and Orissa as Assistant Magistrate and Collector, thereafter served as District and Sessions Judge. He was Registrar of the Patna High Court. Das also became the Secretary, Legislative Department, Judicial Secretary and Legal Remembrancer and Labour Commissioner under the Bihar Government. On 4 November 1944 he was appointed officiating Judge of the Patna High Court and became the Additional Judge in 1945. He served as Permanent Judge of the same High Court from 12 November 1948 to 10 January 1955. Das was elevated to the post of Chief Justice of the High Court in January 1955. He was appointed judge of the Supreme Court of India on 30 April 1956 and served as acting Chief Justice from August, 1963.
