= K.B.N. Singh =

Indian judge

K. B. N. Singh

18th Chief Justice of Patna High Court
- In office 19 July 1976 – 12 March 1982
- Preceded by: Shyam Nandan Prasad Singh
- Succeeded by: Surjit Singh Sandhawalia

Governor of Bihar
- In office 31 January 1979 – 19 September 1979
- Preceded by: Jagannath Kaushal
- Succeeded by: Akhlaqur Rahman Kidwai

Personal details
- Born: 1922
- Died: 1999 (aged 76–77)

Krishna Ballabh Narayan Singh (1922–1999) was an Indian judge and a Chief Justice of Patna High Court. He was also the acting Governor of Bihar in 1979. He belongs to Kulharia village in Bhojpur district.
