= Syed Jafar Imam (judge) =

Former Judge of Supreme Court of India (1955-1964)

Hon'ble Justice Syed Jafar Imam

Judge of Supreme Court of India
- In office 10 January 1955 – 31 January 1964
- Nominated by: B. K Mukherjea
- Appointed by: Rajendra Prasad

10th Chief Justice of Patna High Court
- In office 3 September 1953 – 9 January 1955
- Appointed by: Rajendra Prasad
- Preceded by: David Ezra Reuben
- Succeeded by: Sudhansu Kumar Das

Judge of Patna High Court
- In office 25 October 1943 – 2 September 1953
- Appointed by: George VI

Advocate General of Bihar
- In office 1942–1943
- Appointed by: Thomas Alexander Stewart
- Preceded by: Baldeo Sahay
- Succeeded by: Mahabir Prasad

Personal details
- Born: 18 April 1900 Neora, Patna, Bengal Presidency, British India
- Died: 30 November 1965 (aged 65)
- Relations: Syed Hasan Imam (uncle), M. H. Beg (son-in-law)
- Parent: Syed Ali Imam
- Education: Trinity College, Cambridge; Middle Temple
- Profession: Judge, Barrister

Syed Jafar Imam (18 April 1900 – 30 November 1965) was an Indian Judge, who served as Chief Justice of the Patna High Court and later as a Judge of the Supreme Court of India.

== Family and education ==
Imam was born at Neora in Patna district, he belonged to the prominent Imam family of Bihar. His father, Sir Syed Ali Imam, was a noted lawyer and Judge of the Patna High Court and member of the Imperial Legislative Council, while his uncle, Syed Hasan Imam, was an eminent lawyer, public figure and later a Judge of the Calcutta High Court. Imam's daughter was married to Mirza Hameedullah Beg, who went on to become the Chief Justice of India in 1977–78.

Imam received his education in England, studying at Lynam's Preparatory School in Oxford, Malvern College in Worcestershire and Trinity College, Cambridge. He was called to the Bar at the Middle Temple on 26 January 1922.

== Career ==
After returning to India, he began practising at the Patna High Court in March 1922 and developed a reputation as a capable criminal lawyer. He later served as an Assistant Government Pleader and, in 1942, was appointed Advocate-General of Bihar. On 25 October 1943, he was elevated to the Bench of the Patna High Court. After serving as a Judge for about a decade, he became Chief Justice of the Patna High Court on 3 September 1953, succeeding Justice David Ezra Reuben. He served as Chief Justice until 10 January 1955.

On 10 January 1955, Imam was elevated to the Supreme Court of India. He served on the Supreme Court Bench for nearly nine years and resigned on 31 January 1964 when he was passed over by junior judge P. B. Gajendragadkar for the office of Chief Justice of India. After retirement, he returned to Patna and remained away from public life. He died on 30 November 1965.

Imam was in line to become CJI as per seniority convention. Had he was not superseded for his illness he was to become the first Muslim Chief Justice of India, later Mohammad Hidayatullah achieved this feat in 1968.
