= Fazl Ali =

Indian judge and politician (1886 – 1959)

Sir Saiyid Fazl Ali OBE
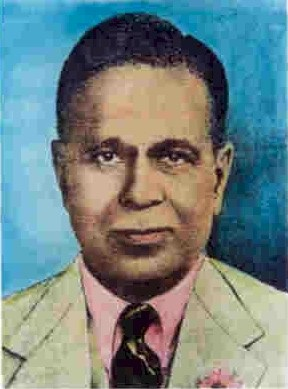

4th Governor of Assam
- In office 15 May 1956 – 22 August 1959
- Chief Minister: Bishnuram Medhi; B. P. Chaliha
- Preceded by: Jairamdas Daulatram
- Succeeded by: C. P. Sinha (acting)

3rd Governor of Odisha
- In office 7 June 1952 – 9 February 1954
- Chief Minister: Nabakrushna Choudhuri
- Preceded by: Asaf Ali
- Succeeded by: P. S. Kumaraswamy Raja

Judge of Supreme Court of India
- In office 28 January 1950 – 18 September 1951
- Appointed by: Rajendra Prasad

Judge of Federal Court of India
- In office 9 June 1947 – 27 January 1950
- Appointed by: George VI

5th Chief Justice of Patna High Court
- In office 19 January 1943 – 14 October 1946
- Appointed by: George VI
- Preceded by: Arthur Trevor Harries
- Succeeded by: Clifford Monmohan Agarwala

Judge of Patna High Court
- In office 11 April 1928 – 19 January 1943
- Appointed by: George V
- Acting Chief Justice
- In office 7 May 1938 – 9 October 1938
- Appointed by: George VI
- Preceded by: Courtney Terrell
- Succeeded by: Arthur Trevor Harries

Personal details
- Born: 19 September 1886
- Died: 22 August 1959 (aged 72)
- Spouse: Kubra Begum
- Children: 5 (including S. Murtaza Fazl Ali)
- Parent: Saiyid Nazir Ali
- Education: Muir Central College

Sir Saiyid Fazl Ali, OBE (19 September 1886 – 22 August 1959) was an Indian judge, the governor of two Indian states (Assam and Odisha), and the head of the States Reorganisation Commission which determined the boundaries of several Indian states in December 1953.

The commission submitted its report in September 1953, broadly accepting language as the basis of reorganisation of states.

== Career ==
Fazl belonged to an aristocratic Syed Zamindar family of Bihar state. He studied law and began practicing. Eventually he was raised to the judiciary. Sir Fazl Ali was successively given the title of Khan Sahib first and of Khan Bahadur later. In 1918, he was made an Officer of the Order of the British Empire (OBE). In April 1928 he was appointed as judge of Patna High Court and went on to serve as its acting chief justice in1938 and later as permanent chief justice in 1943. He was elevated to then Federal Court of India on 9 June 1947 and later appointed as judge of Supreme Court of India upon its establishment on 26 January 1950. In 1951 he became the first judge to retire from Supreme Court of India. He was knighted in the 1941 New Year Honours list and invested with his knighthood on 1 May 1942 by the Viceroy, Lord Linlithgow.

India became independent in 1947 as the Dominion of India. Under the new dispensation of the Republic of India, Sir Fazl Ali was Governor of Odisha from 1952 to 1954, and Governor of Assam from 1956 to 1959. He died while serving as Governor of Assam. Whilst in Assam, he made strenuous efforts to bring the disgruntled Naga tribals into the mainstream of society. He opened the first college in the Naga heartland in Mokokchung, which is today known as 'Fazl Ali College' in his honour. The College celebrated its 50th anniversary in 2010.

Over the course of his tenure on the Supreme Court, Fazl Ali authored 56 judgments and was a part of 113 benches. Notably, he dissented in two early free speech cases before the Supreme Court, Romesh Thapar v. State of Madras (1950) and Brij Bhushan v. State of Delhi (1950).

Fazl Ali headed the States Reorganisation Commission that made recommendations about the reorganization of India's states. For his services to India, he was bestowed with the country's second-highest civilian honour, the Padma Vibhushan, by the government of India in 1956.

Government offices
Preceded by Jairamdas Daulatram	Governor of Assam; 1956–1959	Succeeded by Chandreswar Prasad Sinha
