= Konduswami Venkataswamy =

Indian judge (born 1933)

26th Chief Justice of Patna High Court
- In office 19 June 1994 – 5 March 1995
- Preceded by: K. S. Paripoornan
- Succeeded by: Gopal Ballav Pattanaik

Judge of Madras High Court
- In office 24 July 1983 – 18 June 1994

Personal details
- Born: 6 March 1933

Konduswami Venkataswamy (born 6 March 1933) was an Indian judge and a Chief Justice of Patna High Court. He was a former judgeofMadras High Court.
