= Clifford Monmohan Agarwala =

6th Chief Justice of Patna High Court

Chief Justice Clifford Monmohan Agarwala

6th Chief Justice of Patna High Court
- In office 9 January 1948 – 24 January 1950
- Appointed by: Lord Mountbatten
- Preceded by: Fazl Ali
- Succeeded by: Herbert Ribton Meredith

Judge of Patna High Court
- In office 11 July 1933 – 8 January 1948; Acting CJ : 15 October 1946 - 8 January 1948
- Appointed by: George V

Personal details
- Born: 1890
- Died: 1972 (aged 81–82)
- Education: Aldenham School

Clifford Monmohan Agarwala (1890 — 1972) was the 6th Chief Justice of Patna High Court and also former judge of the same High Court

== Career ==
Sir Agarwala was educated at Aldenham School. He was called to the Bar of Gray's Inn in 1911 and started practise since 1912 as a Barrister in Patna. He was appointed a Judge of the Patna High Court on 11 July 1933. He was elevated to the post of Chief Justice of this High Court on 9 January 1948 before being elevated as permanent chief justice, he served as acting chief justice of Patna High Court for more than a year since retirement of the then chief justice Fazl Ali on 14 October 1946. He resigned from the post of chief justice on 24 January 1950.
