= Herbert Ribton Meredith =

British Indian Judge

Sir Sir Herbert Ribton Meredith

7th Chief Justice of Patna High Court
- In office 25 January 1950 – 7 April 1950
- Appointed by: C. Rajagopalachari
- Preceded by: C. M. Agarwala
- Succeeded by: Pandit Lakshmi Kant Jha

Judge of Patna High Court
- In office 1 October 1940 – 24 January 1950
- Appointed by: George VI

Personal details
- Born: 8 January 1890 Dublin, Ireland
- Died: 1 May 1959 (aged 69) Kent, United Kingdom
- Relations: Frederick William Meredith (brother)
- Education: Trinity College Dublin
- Occupation: ICS Officer, Judge

Sir Herbert Ribton Meredith (8 January 1890 – 1960) was an Irish member of the Indian Civil Service and a judge who served as the 7th Chief Justice of the Patna High Court in India from 1949 to 1950. He is the brother of Frederick William Meredith, the Irish communist and Soviet agent.

== Early life and education ==
Herbert Ribton Meredith was born in Dublin in the famous Meredith family of Ireland. He passed from Trinity College Dublin in 1913 he joined in the Indian Civil Service (ICS). He was initially posted to the province of Bihar and Orissa. he served as Assistant Magistrate and Collector in various districts later transferred to the judicial branch as District and Sessions Judge. In 1932 he became the Secretary to the Legal Remembrancer and Judicial Secretary to the Government of Bihar. On 1 October 1940, Meredith was elevated as a Judge of the Patna High Court. In January 1950, he was appointed Chief Justice of the Patna High Court, succeeding Sir Clifford Monmohan Agarwala. Sir Meredith was knighted in the 1948 New Year Honours list for his service.
