= Arthur Trevor Harries =

British Indian judge (1892-1959)

Sir Arthur Trevor Harries
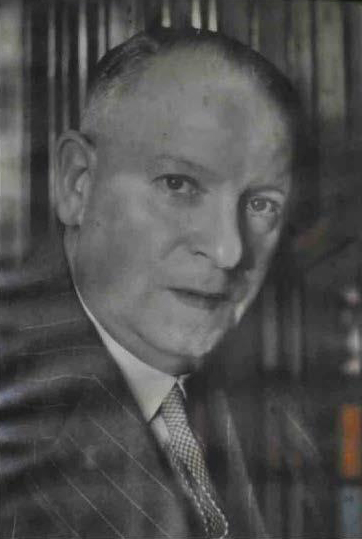

10th Chief Justice of Calcutta High Court
- In office 1946 – 12 June 1952
- Appointed by: George VI
- Preceded by: Harold Derbyshire
- Succeeded by: P. B. Chakravartti

3rd Chief Justice of Lahore High Court
- In office 1943–1946
- Appointed by: George VI
- Preceded by: John Douglas Young
- Succeeded by: Mian Abdul Rashid

4th Chief Justice of Patna High Court
- In office 10 October 1938 – 18 January 1943
- Appointed by: George VI
- Preceded by: Courtney Terrell; Fazl Ali (acting)
- Succeeded by: Saiyid Fazl Ali

Judge of Allahabad High Court
- In office 1934 – 9 October 1938
- Appointed by: George V

Personal details
- Born: 13 June 1892
- Died: 1 July 1959 (aged 67)
- Education: University College of Wales, Aberystwyth; Emmanuel College, Cambridge
- Profession: Barrister

Sir Arthur Trevor Harries (13 June 1892 – 1 July 1959) was a British Indian judge. He served as the chief justice of three High Courts of India: Patna, Lahore and Calcutta High Court.

== Career ==
Educated at University College of Wales, Aberystwyth and Emmanuel College, Cambridge, Harries was called to the English bar by the Middle Temple in 1922 and practised on the South Wales Circuit until 1934, when he became the puisne judge of Allahabad High Court. He served there four years and was elevated as the Chief Justice of Patna High Court in 1938. He was knighted in 1939.

Upon the retirement of Sir Douglas Young, he became the Chief Justice of Lahore High Court in 1942. In 1946, Harries was transferred to Kolkata and became the Chief Justice of the Calcutta High Court after Sir Harold Derbyshire. He retired from the post in 1952.

Legal offices
Preceded by Sir Harold Derbyshire	Chief Justice of Bengal; 1942–1952	Succeeded by Phani Bhusan Chakravartti
