= Rekha Doshit =

Rekha Manharlal Doshit was the Chief Justice of patna High Court, Patna in the Indian state of Bihar.

== Early life and career ==
Doshit was born on 13 December 1952 in Rajkot, Gujarat, India. She graduated from Bombay University in Bachelor of Science and Law from Sir L.A. Shah Law College, Ahmedabad. She started her career as an advocate in 1977. In 1995, she was appointed judge at Gujarat High Court. On 21 June 2010, Doshit was promoted to the Chief Justice of Patna High Court, and thus became the first woman Chief Justice of Patna High Court.
