= Rajendra Menon =

Chairperson of Armed Forces Tribunal

Hon'ble Justice Rajendra Menon

Chairperson of Armed Forces Tribunal
- Incumbent
- Assumed office 6 November 2019
- Nominated by: Ranjan Gogoi
- Appointed by: Appointments Committee of the Cabinet

30th Chief Justice of Delhi High Court
- In office 9 August 2018 – 6 June 2019
- Nominated by: Dipak Misra
- Appointed by: Ram Nath Kovind
- Preceded by: Gita Mittal
- Succeeded by: Dhirubhai Naranbhai Patel

40th Chief Justice of Patna High Court
- In office 15 March 2017 – 8 August 2018
- Nominated by: Jagdish Singh Khehar
- Appointed by: Pranab Mukherjee

Judge of Madhya Pradesh High Court
- In office 1 April 2002 – 14 March 2017
- Nominated by: Sam Piroj Bharucha
- Appointed by: Kocheril Raman Narayanan

Personal details
- Born: 7 June 1957 (age 69) Mannarkkad, Palakkad, Kerala
- Education: NES Law College

Rajendra Menon is an Indian judge. Presently, he is chairperson of Armed Forces Tribunal. He is a former Chief Justice of Delhi High Court. He was born on 7 June 1957 and hails from Jabalpur, in Madhya Pradesh. He was a judge and later the Acting Chief Justice of the Madhya Pradesh High Court, and later the Chief Justice of the Patna High Court.

== Education ==
He completed his school education from Christ Church Boys Senior Secondary School, Jabalpur. He then pursued a degree in science from the Government Science College, Jabalpur. In the year 1981, he completed his LLB from NES Law College, Jabalpur.

== Career ==
Rajendra Menon practiced law in the office of Senior Advocate P. Sadasivan Nair. Until his elevation to the Bench, he was Standing Counsel for Central Government from 1991. He also represented several private and public sector undertakings and other private entities.

== Judgeship ==
Rajendra Menon was elevated to the Gwalior Bench of the Madhya Pradesh High Court as an Additional Judge on 1 April 2002. In 2008, he got posted at the Principal Bench at Jabalpur, until his elevation as the Chief Justice of the Patna High Court on 15 March 2017. He was transferred as the Chief Justice of Delhi High Court on 9 August 2018. He retired on 6 June 2019. He was recommended as the Chairperson of the Armed Forces Tribunal (AFT) in September 2019 by Chief Justice of India Ranjan Gogoi. He was appointed Chairperson of the AFT on 6 November 2019 by Appointments Committee of the Cabinet.
