= Nagendra Prasad Singh (judge) =

Indian Judge

Nagendra Prasad Singh (b: 25 December 1931) or N.P Singh is an Indian Judge and former Justice of Supreme Court of India.

== Career ==
Singh was enrolled as an advocate on 9 January 1956. In 1973, he became the Judge of the Patna High Court. He also served as the Acting Chief Justice of Patna High Court in 1991. On 4 February 1992 Sing was appointed as Chief Justice of the Calcutta High Court. He was elevated as the Judge of the Supreme Court of India on 15 June 1992, wherefrom he was retired in 1996.
