= Patna Law College =

Law college in Bihar

- Type: Public, Law college
- Established: 1909
- Affiliations: Patna University
- Chancellor: Lt. Gen. Shri Syed Ata Hasnain (Retd.)
- Vice-Chancellor: Prof. Ajay Kumar Singh
- Principal: Prof.(Dr.) Yogendra Kumar Verma
- Location: Patna, Bihar, India
- Website: www.patnalawcollege.ac.in

Patna Law College is public law college in Patna, in the Indian state of Bihar. This is affiliated to the Patna University and courses were approved by the Bar Council of India of New Delhi.

== History ==
Patna Law College was established in July 1909. Prior to the establishment of this institution the teaching of law used to be imparted in Patna College. Till 1917 the college was affiliated to Calcutta University. When Patna University came into existence in 1917, it became affiliated to it. Up to 1 January 1952, Patna Law College was a government institution and functioned as an independent unit. From that date it became a constituent college of Patna University under the Patna University Act, 1951.
