= Ajoy Nath Ray =

11th Chief Justice of Sikkim High Court

Hon'ble Chief Justice (Retd.) Ajoy Nath Ray
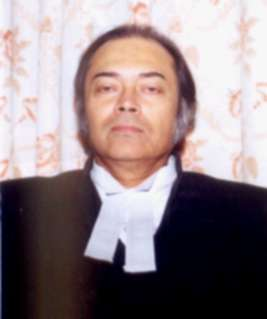

Chairman of Sikkim Human Rights Commission
- In office 25 November 2008 – 13 November 2013
- Appointed by: Balmiki Prasad Singh
- Preceded by: Office established
- Succeeded by: Narendra Kumar Jain

11th Chief Justice of Sikkim High Court
- In office 27 January 2007 – 30 October 2008
- Nominated by: Y. K. Sabharwal
- Appointed by: A. P. J. Abdul Kalam
- Preceded by: Binod Kumar Roy; N. Surajmani Singh (acting)
- Succeeded by: Aftab Hussain Saikia; A. P. Subba (acting)

39th Chief Justice of Allahabad High Court
- In office 11 January 2005 – 26 January 2007
- Nominated by: R. C. Lahoti
- Appointed by: A. P. J. Abdul Kalam
- Preceded by: Tarun Chatterjee; Markandey Katju (acting); Vishnu Sahai (acting); S. R. Alam (acting)
- Succeeded by: H. L. Gokhale; S. R. Alam (acting)

Judge of Calcutta High Court
- In office 6 August 1990 – 10 January 2005
- Nominated by: Sabyasachi Mukharji
- Appointed by: R. Venkataraman
- Acting Chief Justice
- In office 7 June 2004 – 10 January 2005
- Appointed by: A. P. J. Abdul Kalam
- Preceded by: Ashok Kumar Mathur
- Succeeded by: V. S. Sirpurkar; Altamas Kabir (acting); A. K. Ganguly (acting)

Personal details
- Born: 31 October 1946 (age 80) Kolkata, West Bengal
- Parent: Ajit Nath Ray (father)
- Education: Oriel College, Oxford (B.A.), Calcutta University (B.Sc Physics)

Ajoy Nath Ray (born 31 October 1946) is a retired Indian judge who served as Chief Justice of the Allahabad High Court and subsequently as Chief Justice of the Sikkim High Court. He also served as judge and acting chief justice of Calcutta High Court.

== Early life and education ==
Ray was born on 31 October 1946 in Kolkata. His father, Ajit Nath Ray, served as Chief Justice of India during a particularly consequential period in the country's constitutional history. Ajit Nath Ray's appointment as Chief Justice in April 1973, superseding three senior Supreme Court judges, became a major controversy concerning judicial appointments and the relationship between the judiciary and the executive. Ajoy pursued his undergraduate education at the University of Calcutta, graduating with Honours in Physics. He subsequently studied at Oriel College, Oxford, where he obtained a Bachelor of Arts degree in the Honours School of Jurisprudence.

== Career ==
Ray enrolled as an advocate of the Calcutta High Court on 4 August 1970 and began practising in civil matters. He continued his legal practice for approximately two decades before his elevation to the Bench. On 6 August 1990, Ray was appointed a permanent judge of the Calcutta High Court. He served on the Calcutta High Court for nearly 14 years, before being appointed as Acting Chief Justice of the Calcutta High Court from 7 June 2004 following elevation of Chief Justice Ashok Kumar Mathur to Supreme Court of India till his own elevation as Chief Justice of Allahabad High Court on 10 January 2005. In January 2007, Ray was transferred to the Sikkim High Court as Chief Justice and assumed office on 27 January. He remained in that position until his retirement on 30 October 2008.

Immediately after his retirement as Chief Justice, Government of Sikkim appointed him as the first chairman of newly constituted Sikkim State Human Rights Commission on 25 November 2008 where he served till 2013.

== Transfer controversy ==
Ray’s transfer from the Allahabad High Court to the Sikkim High Court in January 2007 generated controversy because of the stark difference in the size and importance of the two High Courts. Ray, who had been Chief Justice of the Allahabad High Court since 11 January 2005, was transferred following a recommendation by the Supreme Court Collegium headed by Chief Justice of India Y. K. Sabharwal in December 2006. The move attracted criticism because Allahabad was one of India’s largest High Courts, while Sikkim was the country’s smallest, leading to speculation that the transfer might have been punitive rather than purely administrative. A contemporaneous Times of India report raised questions about the rationale for the transfer and discussed perceptions of Ray’s independent and uncompromising approach.
