= Vijay Kumar Bist =

20th Chief Justice of Sikkim High Court

Hon'ble Chief Justice (Retd.) Vijay Kumar Bist

Chairman of Uttarakhand Human Rights Commission
- In office 18 March 2023 – 17 March 2026
- Appointed by: Gurmit Singh
- Succeeded by: Girdhar Singh Dharmshaktu
- In office 21 January 2020 – 20 January 2023
- Appointed by: Baby Rani Maurya
- Preceded by: Jagadish Bhalla

Chairman of Sikkim Human Rights Commission
- In office 5 November 2019 – 4 November 2022
- Appointed by: Ganga Prasad
- Preceded by: Narendra Kumar Jain
- Succeeded by: M. M. Rai

20th Chief Justice of Sikkim High Court
- In office 30 October 2018 – 16 September 2019
- Nominated by: Ranjan Gogoi
- Appointed by: Ram Nath Kovind
- Preceded by: S. K. Agnihotri; M. M. Rai (acting)
- Succeeded by: A. K. Goswami; M. M. Rai (acting)

Judge of Uttarakhand High Court
- In office 1 November 2008 – 29 October 2018
- Nominated by: K. G. Balakrishnan
- Appointed by: Pratibha Patil
- Acting Chief Justice
- In office 5 June 2014 – 30 July 2014
- Appointed by: Pranab Mukherjee
- Preceded by: Barin Ghosh
- Succeeded by: K. M. Joseph

Personal details
- Born: September 17, 1957 (age 69) Lansdown, Pauri Garhwal, Uttarakhand
- Education: Allahabad University (LL.B)

Vijay Kumar Bist (born 17 September 1957) is a retired Indian judge, who had served as the 9th Chief Justice of Sikkim High Court and former judge of Uttarakhand High Court.

== Career ==
Bist was born in Lansdown, Pauri Garhwal district, in Uttarakhand. He passed from Intermediate College Kanskhet, Pauri Garhwal and completed LL.B. from Allahabad University. He enrolled as an advocate with Bar Council of Uttar Pradesh in 1984 and started practice under S.P. Gupta, Senior Advocate from 1984 in the various courts of Uttar Pradesh as well as Allahabad High Court. He practised in Allahabad High Court till November 2000 when Uttarakhand High Court was created and he shifted his practice to here. In his lawyer career, Bist was the Legal advisor and Standing Counsel of Allahabad University, North Eastern Railway, various Corporations, Housing Federation, Development Authority like government undertaking institutions. He also served as panel advocate of Uttarakhand State Government in the Uttarakhand High Court. He was designated as senior advocate on 1 July 2004

He was elevated as Judge of the Uttarakhand High Court on 1 November 2008 and served as its acting chief justice from 5 June 2014 to 30 July 2014. On 30 October 2018 Justice Bist was appointed the Chief Justice of Sikkim High Court.He retired on 16 September 2019.

Post retirement he was appointed as the chairman of the Sikkim State Human Rights Commission and assumed office on 5 November 2019 succeeding Justice Narendra Kumar Jain. He served in this position till 4 November 2022. He was appointed as chairman Uttarakhand Human Rights Commission in 2020.
