= Meenakshi Madan Rai =

48th Chief Justice of Patna High Court

Hon'ble Chief Justice (Retd.) Meenakshi Madan Rai

Chairperson of Sikkim Human Rights Commission
- Incumbent
- Assumed office 5 August 2026
- Appointed by: Om Prakash Mathur
- Preceded by: Vijay Kumar Bist

48th Chief Justice of Patna High Court
- In office 5 June 2026 – 11 July 2026
- Nominated by: Surya Kant
- Appointed by: Droupadi Murmu
- Preceded by: Sangam Kumar Sahoo
- Succeeded by: V. Kameswar Rao; Sudhir Singh (acting)

Judge of Sikkim High Court
- In office 15 April 2015 – 4 June 2026
- Nominated by: H. L. Dattu
- Appointed by: Pranab Mukherjee
- Acting Chief Justice
- In office 15 December 2025 – 3 January 2026
- Appointed by: Droupadi Murmu
- Preceded by: Biswanath Somadder
- Succeeded by: A. Muhamed Mustaque
- In office 1 September 2021 – 11 October 2021
- Appointed by: Ramnath Kovind
- Preceded by: J. K. Maheshwari
- Succeeded by: Biswanath Somadder
- In office 17 September 2019 – 14 October 2019
- Appointed by: Ramnath Kovind
- Preceded by: V. K. Bist
- Succeeded by: Arup Kumar Goswami
- In office 1 July 2018 – 29 October 2018
- Appointed by: Ramnath Kovind
- Preceded by: S. K. Agnihotri
- Succeeded by: V. K. Bist

Personal details
- Born: 12 July 1964 (age 62) Gangtok, Sikkim
- Education: Lady Shri Ram College, University of Delhi (LL.B)

Meenakshi Madan Rai (born 12 July 1964) is a retired Indian jurist who is currently serving as chairman of Sikkim State Human Rights Commission. She had served as the 48th chief justice of Patna High Court. She is a former judge of the Sikkim High Court. She has also served as Acting Chief Justice of that High Court various times.

== Early life and education ==
Justice Rai was born 12 July 1964 to Madan Mohan Rasaily and Rabi Mala Rasaily, Former Home Secretary to Government of Sikkim and former school teacher respectively. She completed her schooling in Sikkim and graduated from Lady Shri Ram College in Delhi and earned her Law degree from Campus Law Centre, Delhi University and enrolled as advocate with Bar Association of Delhi in 1990.

== Career ==
She joined Sikkim Judicial Services in 1990 and rose through the ranks to eventually become Registrar General of Sikkim High Court twice in 2006 and 2009 respectively. She was elevated to the bench of Sikkim High Court on 15 April 2015 becoming the first lady from Sikkim to hold the post of High Court Judge. In Sikkim High Court, she served as Acting Chief Justice in 2018, 2019, 2021, and lastly in 2025.

In last leg of her judicial career, her chances of being elevated as permanent chief justice were halted by the controversy, which arose due to her administrative directions in capacity of acting chief justice targeting her predecessor Biswanath Somadder nevertheless, on 22 May 2026, the Supreme Court Collegium recommended the appointment of Justice Rai as the next chief justice of Patna High Court after retirement of the Chief Justice Sangam Kumar Sahoo on 4 June 2026. Central government cleared her elevation on 2 June 2026 and she took oath on 5 June 2026. She retired a month later on 11 July 2026.

Governor of Sikkim, Om Prakash Mathur appointed her as chairman of Sikkim State Human Rights Commission on 5 August 2026 for the period of three years.
