= V. S. Sirpurkar =

Indian judge (born 1946)

Hon'ble Justice (Retd.) Vikas Sridhar Sirpurkar

Judge of Supreme Court of India
- In office 12 January 2007 – 21 August 2011
- Nominated by: Y. K. Sabharwal
- Appointed by: A. P. J. Abdul Kalam

32nd Chief Justice of Calcutta High Court
- In office 20 March 2005 – 11 January 2007
- Nominated by: R. C. Lahoti
- Appointed by: A. P. J. Abdul Kalam
- Preceded by: A. K. Mathur; A. N. Ray (acting); A. Kabir (acting); A. K. Ganguly (acting)
- Succeeded by: Surinder Singh Nijjar; B. Bhattacharya (acting)

3rd Chief Justice of Uttarakhand High Court
- In office 25 July 2004 – 19 March 2005
- Nominated by: R. C. Lahoti
- Appointed by: A. P. J. Abdul Kalam
- Preceded by: S. H. Kapadia; P. C. Verma (acting)
- Succeeded by: Cyriac Joseph

Judge of Madras High Court
- In office 19 December 1997 – 24 July 2004
- Nominated by: J. S. Verma
- Appointed by: K. R. Narayanan

Judge of Bombay High Court
- In office 9 November 1992 – 18 December 1997
- Nominated by: M. H. Kania
- Appointed by: S. D. Sharma

Personal details
- Born: 22 August 1946 (age 80)
- Education: Morris College, Nagpur, University College of Law, Nagpur

Vikas Shridhar Sirpurkar (born 22 August 1946) is a retired judge of the Supreme Court of India. He was appointed Supreme Court judge on 12 January 2007 and retired on 21 August 2011, completing a four-and-a-half-year tenure.

== Career ==
Sirpurkar became a judge of Bombay High Court on 9 November 1992 and was transferred to the Madras High Court on 19 December 1997. He was elevated to Chief Justice of Uttarakhand High Court where he served from 25 July 2004 to 19 March 2005. He then assumed office of the Chief Justice of the Calcutta High Court from 20 March 2005 up to 11 January 2007. Finally he was appointed a Judge of the Supreme Court of India on 12 January 2007 and retired on 21 August 2011, after reaching the retiring age of 65. After retiring from the Supreme Court of India, he is expected to take office as the Chairman of the Competition Appellate Tribunal from July, 2012, following the retirement of Justice Arijit Pasayat from that position in May, 2012.

== Notable judgements ==
His notable judgements include the confirmation of death sentence on Pakistani national Mohammed Arif alias Ashfaq in the 2000 Delhi Red Fort attack, part of a two judge bench with Justice T. S. Thakur. In December 2009, he reduced the death sentence to life imprisonment in a case of "honour killing" of a girl by her brother. In the hooch case in which he pulled up the Kerala government. He also ruled that the services provided by the office of Regional Provident Fund Commissioner would come under the ambit of "service" under the Consumer Protection Act of 1986 and that a PF scheme subscriber was a "consumer" under this act.
