= Biswanath Somadder =

23rd Chief Justice of Sikkim High Court

Hon'ble Chief Justice (Retd.) Biswanath Somadder
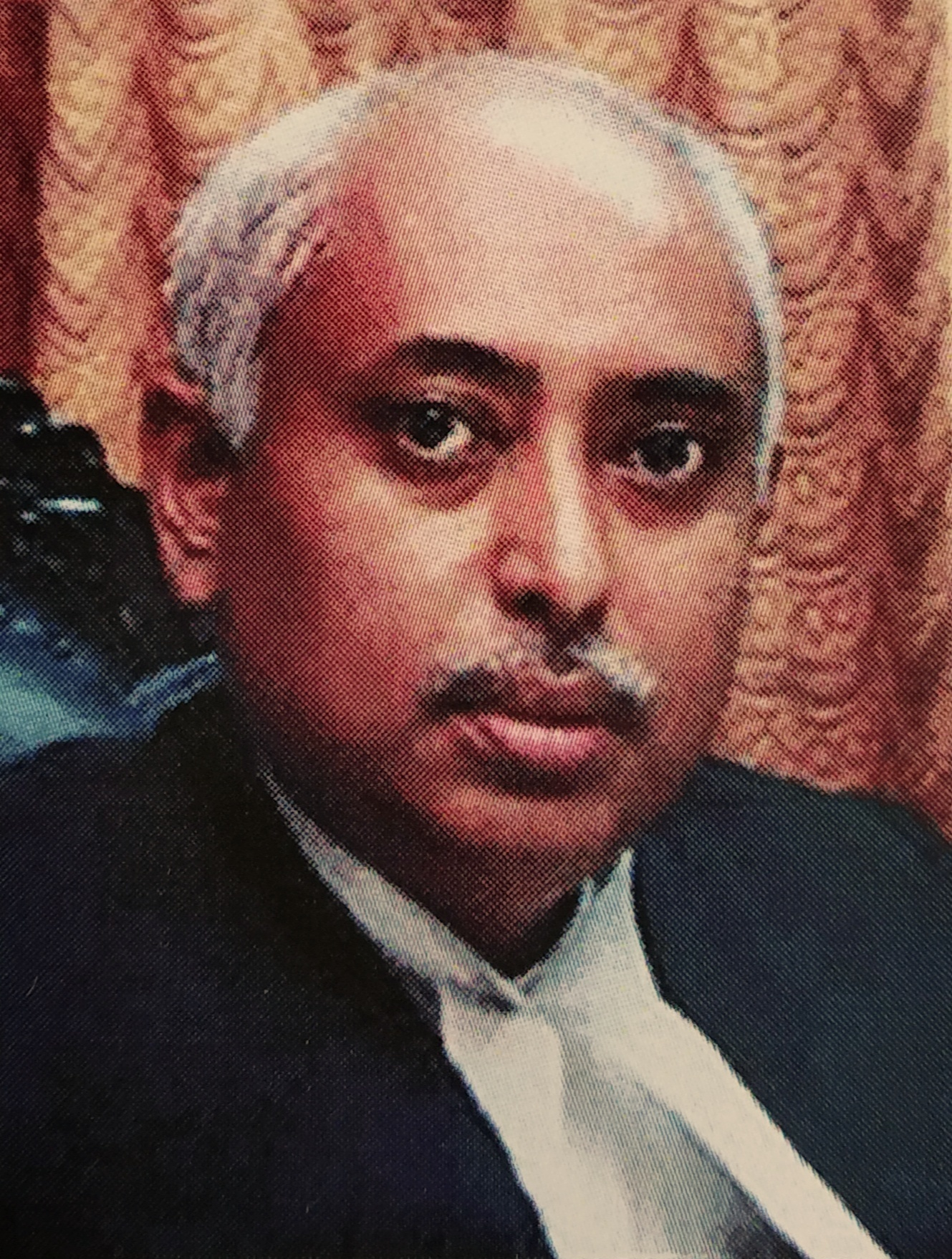

23rd Chief Justice of Sikkim High Court
- In office 12 October 2021 – 14 December 2025
- Nominated by: N. V. Ramana
- Appointed by: Ram Nath Kovind
- Preceded by: J. K. Maheshwari; M. M. Rai (acting)
- Succeeded by: A. Muhamed Mustaque; M. M. Rai (acting)

9th Chief Justice of Meghalaya High Court
- In office 27 April 2020 – 11 October 2021
- Nominated by: Sharad Arvind Bobde
- Appointed by: Ram Nath Kovind
- Preceded by: Mohammad Rafiq
- Succeeded by: Ranjit Vasantrao More

Judge of Allahabad High Court
- In office 17 October 2019 – 26 April 2020
- Nominated by: Ranjan Gogoi
- Appointed by: Ram Nath Kovind

Judge of Calcutta High Court
- In office 22 June 2006 – 16 October 2019
- Nominated by: Yogesh Kumar Sabharwal
- Appointed by: A. P. J. Abdul Kalam
- Acting Chief Justice
- In office 1 January 2019 – 3 April 2019
- Appointed by: Ram Nath Kovind
- Preceded by: Debasish Kar Gupta
- Succeeded by: T. B. Radhakrishnan

Personal details
- Born: 15 December 1963 (age 62)
- Education: B. A. and LL.B.
- Alma mater: University of Calcutta

Biswanath Somadder (born 15 December 1963) is a retired Indian judge, who has served as 23rd Chief Justice of Sikkim High Court and 9th Meghalaya High Court. He is a former judge of Allahabad High Court and Calcutta High Court. He has also served as Acting Chief Justice of the Calcutta High Court in 2019.

== Early life and education ==
Justice Somadder was born on 15 December 1963. He completed his schooling from the La Martiniere for Boys school, Calcutta. He then passed his Bachelor of Arts and LL.B. from the University of Calcutta and also completed a Certificate Course on Office Automation Tools under the Computer Education Programme of the Regional Computer Centre, Kolkata.

== Career ==
Somadder was enrolled as an advocate on 21 July 1989. He practised in the High Court at Calcutta as well as the Supreme Court of India and also appeared before CESTAT, Eastern Regional Bench. Somadder practised in Constitutional (Customs & Central Excise, FERA, Telecommunication, Education, Service and Income Tax), Arbitration, Company, Revenue, Civil and Criminal matters, and specialised in Revenue, Arbitration and Constitutional laws. Somadder was senior counsel for the Central Government in the High Court at Calcutta and was also the honorary joint secretary of the Bar Library Club of Calcutta High Court, till just prior to his elevation.

On 22 June 2006, he was elevated as a permanent judge of the Calcutta High Court. Justice Somadder was appointed the executive chairman of the State Legal Services Authority of West Bengal on 5 November 2018. Appointed Judge-in-Charge, Administrative Department, High Court at Calcutta, to discharge the functions assigned under the Appellate Side Rules of the High Court at Calcutta, with effect from 19 November 2018. He became the Acting Chief Justice of the Calcutta High Court from 1 January 2019 and retained the post till 3 April 2019. He assumed charge as judge of the Allahabad High Court on 17 October 2019.

On 23 April 2020, he was appointed the Chief justice of Meghalaya High Court and took oath on 27 April 2020. He was transferred as Chief Justice of Sikkim High Court on 9 October 2021 and took oath on 12 October 2021.

He retired as Chief Justice of Sikkim High Court on 14 December 2025 upon reaching age of superannuation i.e. 62 years, bringing an end to 2 decades long career as Judge.

== Controversies ==
He was not elevated to Supreme Court though he has been the senior most High Court judge in the all India Seniority of all High Court judges for more than 2 years. His and Dipankar Datta's non elevation to Supreme Court in May 2022 has generated significant controversy when much junior J. B. Pardiwala of Gujarat High Court was elevated to Supreme Court, had they both were elevated at this time both Somadder and Datta would be in line to become CJI in 2028. However, in December 2022, Dipankar Datta (junior to Justice Somadder, though both became judge on same day i.e. 22 June 2006) was elevated to Supreme court but Justice Somadder was left. Again in March 2025, appointment of Junior judge Joymalya Bagchi of Calcutta High Court to Supreme Court bypassing senior judges including Somadder has generated controversy.

Immediately after his retirement as Chief Justice of Sikkim High Court the then acting chief justice of Sikkim High Court Meenakshi Madan Rai withdrew his security cover, vehicles and drivers, and gave him a direction asking him to vacate the official residence, all these directions were issued purportedly in backdrop of his letter to CJI complaining about the conduct of Justice Rai. Situation de-escalated after CJI Kant and senior supreme court judge Justice J. K. Maheshwari, also former chief justice of Sikkim High Court, stepped in. Official vehicle of Somadder was restored and eviction notice was deferred.
