= Repusudan Dayal =

Indian judge (1941 - 2023)

Hon'ble Chief Justice (Retd.) Repusudan Dayal

4th Lokayukta of Madhya Pradesh
- In office 22 June 2003 – 22 June 2009
- Appointed by: Ram Prakash Gupta
- Preceded by: Faizanuddin
- Succeeded by: P. P. Naolekar

8th Chief Justice of Sikkim High Court
- In office 3 February 1999 – 17 May 2003
- Nominated by: A. S. Anand
- Appointed by: K. R. Narayanan
- Preceded by: K. A. Thanikkachallam; Malay Sengupta (acting); Anup Deb (acting)
- Succeeded by: R. K. Patra; N. Surajmani Singh (acting)

Judge of Calcutta High Court
- In office 21 July 1997 – 2 February 1999
- Nominated by: J. S. Verma
- Appointed by: S. D. Sharma

Judge of Allahabad High Court
- In office 18 October 1995 – 20 July 1997
- Nominated by: A. M. Ahmadi
- Appointed by: S. D. Sharma

Judge of Sikkim High Court
- In office 10 May 1984 – 17 October 1995
- Nominated by: Y. V. Chandrachud
- Appointed by: Zail Singh
- Acting Chief Justice
- In office 9 November 1992 – 19 January 1993
- Appointed by: S. D. Sharma
- Preceded by: Braja Nath Misra
- Succeeded by: Surendra Nath Bhargava
- In office 5 January 1989 – 19 January 1990
- Appointed by: R. Venkataraman
- Preceded by: Jugal Kishore Mohanty
- Succeeded by: Braja Nath Misra

Personal details
- Born: 18 May 1941
- Died: 8 January 2023 (aged 81)

Repusudan Dayal (18 May 1941 - 8 January 2023) is an Indian Judge, Lokayukta of Madhya Pradesh and former Chief Justice of the Sikkim High Court.

== Career ==
Dayal joined in the Uttar Pradesh Judicial Service on 22 February 1966. In 1975, he became the additional Judge of Small Cause Court, New Delhi. He was appointed Additional and District Sessions Judge in 1979.

He was the judge, then serving as Additional Chief Metropolitan Magistrate, before whom Indira Gandhi was produced after being arrested on 3 October 1977. He outrightly held that no case was made out against her and directed that she be set free.

Initially he was proposed to be appointed as Judge in Orissa High Court, the then chief justice of Orissa also endorsed this proposal but this proposal was dropped due to strong opposition by Orissa High Court Bar Association. Later on 10 May 1984, Dayal became a Judge of the Sikkim High Court, he also served as acting chief justice there twice, thereafter transferred to Allahabad High Court on 18 October 1995. He also served as the Judge of the Calcutta High Court in 1997.

On 3 February 1999, Justice Dayal was elevated to the post of the Chief Justice of the Sikkim High Court and served there until 17 May 2003. He was appointed Chairman of Sikkim State Law Commission and Sikkim State Human Rights Commission after retirement. He also became the Madhya Pradesh Lokayukta in 2003 .
