= A. Muhamed Mustaque =

24th Chief Justice of Sikkim High Court

The Honourable Chief Justice Muhamed Mustaque Ayumantakath

24th Chief Justice of Sikkim High Court
- Incumbent
- Assumed office 4 January 2026
- Nominated by: Surya Kant
- Appointed by: Droupadi Murmu
- Preceded by: Biswanath Somadder; M. M. Rai (acting)

Judge of Kerala High Court
- In office 23 January 2014 – 3 January 2026
- Nominated by: P. Sathasivam
- Appointed by: Pranab Mukherjee
- Acting Chief Justice
- In office 5 July 2024 – 25 September 2024
- Appointed by: Droupadi Murmu
- Preceded by: A. J. Desai
- Succeeded by: N. M. Jamdar

Personal details
- Born: 1 June 1967 (age 59) Thana, Kannur, Kerala
- Education: LL.B, LL.M; PG in Space and Telecommunications Law (from Paris XI University ) Private International Law course (from Hague Academy of International Law ) Advanced course on E- Commerce and Intellectual Property (from WIPO)
- Alma mater: Vaikunta Baliga College of Law; M G University
- Website: High Court of Kerala

Ayumantakath Muhamed Mustaque (born on 1 June 1967) is an Indian jurist currently serving as the Chief justice of the Sikkim High Court. He is former Judge of the Kerala High Court where he also served as the Acting Chief Justice.

== Early life and education ==
Mustaque was born in Thana, Kannur, Kerala on 1 June 1967. He obtained LLB from the Vaikunta Baliga College of Law in Udupi, Karnataka and obtained LLM from Mahatma Gandhi University, Kerala. Thereafter, he obtained his next post-graduation in space and telecommunication law from Paris XI University, studied private international law course at The Hague Academy of International Law, advanced course on e-commerce and intellectual property from the World Intellectual Property Organization and trained as a mediator by a European team from the United Kingdom and MCPC of the Supreme Court of India.

== Career ==
Mustaque enrolled as an advocate in 1989 and started practising in various courts and statutory authorities in Kannur and served for around seven years mainly as a litigation lawyer and arbitrator. He served as a mediator at Kerala Mediation Centre. While practising, he served as standing counsel for Kannur University. He appeared for several educational institutions, telecom companies, local authorities and others and served as a faculty for training on mediation with the Indian Institute of Arbitration and Mediation, panel arbitrator at ICADR AND IIAM and a member of the International Institute of Space Law and Indian Society of International Law.

Mustaque also served as managing editor of the online legal news letter L.I.N.K, charter member and treasurer of India International ADR Association and secretary of Mediators' Council of India. On 23 January 2014, he was appointed an additional judge of the Kerala High Court and became a permanent judge from 10 March 2016. He has been Chairman of the Computerisation Committee of the High Court since 18 September 2019.

Mustaque assumed office as Acting Chief Justice of Kerala High Court on 5 July 2024 consequent upon the retirement of the then chief justice Ashish Jitendra Desai and served as such till the appointment of Nitin Madhukar Jamdar as new permanent chief justice on 21 September 2024.

On 18 December 2025, Supreme court collegium headed by CJI Surya Kant recommended him to be appointed as chief justice of Sikkim High Court and government cleared his elevation on 3 January 2026. He took oath as the chief justice of Sikkim High Court on 4 January 2026.
