= Aftab Hussain Saikia =

28th Chief Justice of Jammu & Kashmir High Court

28th Chief Justice of Jammu & Kashmir High Court
- In office 13 April 2010 – 6 April 2011
- Nominated by: K. G. Balakrishnan
- Appointed by: Pratibha Patil
- Preceded by: Barin Ghosh
- Succeeded by: F. M. I. Kalifulla

12th Chief Justice of Sikkim High Court
- In office 7 March 2009 – 7 April 2010
- Nominated by: K. G. Balakrishnan
- Appointed by: Pratibha Patil
- Preceded by: Ajoy Nath Ray; A. P. Subba (acting)
- Succeeded by: Barin Ghosh

Judge of Gauhati High Court
- In office 15 November 2000 – 6 March 2009
- Nominated by: Adarsh Sein Anand
- Appointed by: K. R. Narayanan

Personal details
- Born: 7 April 1949 (age 77) Dampur, Kamrup District, Assam
- Education: Cotton College, Gauhati (B.Sc.), Gauhati University (LL.B. & LL.M)

Aftab Hussain Saikia (born 7 April 1949) is a retired Indian judge who served as Chief Justice of the Jammu & Kashmir High Court and of the Sikkim High Court. He also served as judge of the Gauhati High Court.

== Education ==
Saikia was born on 7 April 1949 in Dampur village, under Hajo Police Station in the then Kamrup district of Assam. He completed his Bachelor of Science degree with distinction from Cotton College, Guwahati, in 1969. He then studied law at Gauhati University, obtaining his LL.B. in 1974 and LL.M. in 1982. Saikia enrolled as an advocate with the Bar Council of Assam, Nagaland, Meghalaya, Manipur, Tripura, Mizoram and Arunachal Pradesh on 9 August 1974. He started practising in civil, criminal, constitutional and service matters before the Gauhati High Court, its regional benches and subordinate courts across Northeast India for the next 26 years.

== Career ==
He served as Government Advocate and Additional Public Prosecutor for Assam from 1983 to 1986, and as Additional Central Government Standing Counsel at the Gauhati High Court from 1991 to 1994. He also served as Standing Counsel for the Guwahati Municipal Corporation in 1996 and as legal adviser to the Assam Pollution Control Board, from 1991 till his elevation to the High Court in 2000. He became a member of the Bar Council covering the north eastern states in 1983 and served as its Vice-Chairman from 1996 to 1998. He was also a permanent member of the Indian Law Institute, New Delhi. On 3 June 1999, he was designated a Senior Advocate of the Gauhati High Court.

Saikia was appointed as permanent judge of the Gauhati High Court on 15 November 2000. Here he became Executive Chairman of the Assam State Legal Services Authority. On 7 March 2009, he was sworn in as Chief Justice of the Sikkim High Court. He was transferred to Jammu and Kashmir High Court as Chief Justice on 13 April 2010, becoming the first Chief Justice of Sikkim High Court to get transferred out of the High Court. He held this position until his retirement on 6 April 2011.

== Legal education ==
He joined J. B. Law College, affiliated with Gauhati University in 1977 as lecturer and subsequently became its principal in 1991. He also taught LL.M in the Department of Law, Gauhati University twice during 1983–1985 and 1988–1989 an in the university's law college during 1991–1993. In December 2009, while serving as Chief Justice of the Sikkim High Court, he was awarded a Ph.D. in Law by Gauhati University. His research examined the protection of cultural and educational rights of minorities under the Constitution of India. He was the first sitting Judge or Chief Justice of High Court to obtain Ph.D. within the country while in office.

== Post retirement ==
After retirement as Jammu and Kashmir High Court chief justice on 13 April 2010, Saikia was appointed as the Chairperson of Assam Human Rights Commission on 1 December 2011 succeeding Sujit Barman Roy, who resigned in May that year. In July 2016 he was also appointed as the first chairman of Meghalaya Human Rights Commission, which he headed simultaneously with Assam Human Rights Commission until 30 November 2016, when he retired from both offices.

During his tenure as Chairperson of Assam Human Rights Commission in 2013 he became the first judge to implement the Supreme Court judgement banning sirens and beacons from government vehicles by removing these from his official vehicles.
