= Assam Human Rights Commission =

Assam Human Rights Commission असम मानवाधिकार आयोग

Agency overview
- Formed: 19 March 1996

Jurisdictional structure
- Federal agency: India
- Operations jurisdiction: India
- Area: 78438 km^{2}
- Population: 31,205,576 (2011)
- General nature: Federal law enforcement

Operational structure
- Headquarters: Guwahati, Assam
- Agency executives: Justice Aftab Hussain Saikia, Chairman; Shri Tarun Phookan, Member

Website
- Official website

The Assam Human Rights Commission (India) was constituted in the Indian state of Assam on 19 March 1996.

== Composition ==
The State Human Rights Commission was constituted by the Government of India in 1996 to address the public grievances relating to Human Rights violations as per the Protection of Human Rights Act, 1993.

Members when Establish & Current Members
| | As Formed | Current |
|---|---|---|
| Chairman | Justice Surendra Nath Bhargava | Vacant |
| Member (J) | Justice Tarun Chandra Das | Shri Naba Kamal Bora |
| Member (J) | Shri Paramanada Kalita | Vacant |
| Member (NJ) | Seikh Chand Mohammad | Vacant |

=== Investigation Cell ===
The Investigation Cell is headed by a Director in the rank of Inspector General of Police. The cell comprises an SP, Inspector and Constables. The Investigation Cell investigates the cases registered with the Commission.

=== Administration ===
The administration is headed by a Secretary in the rank of Secretary to the Government of Assam. He is assisted by two sets of Officers and Assistants; one set of Officers / Assistants is deputed by the Secretariat Administration Department and the other set of Officers / Assistants are appointed by the Commission itself.

=== Funds ===
The State Government provides funds to the Commission for its functioning under Grants-in-Aid (Salary & non-salary) under the Major Head of Account "2070" which is drawn and disbursed by the Secretariat Administration (Accounts) Department in favor of the Savings Bank Account of Secretary, AHRC for making payment of salary and non salary components.

Funds allotted to AHRC are duly audited by AG, Assam and separate audit reports are placed in Assam Legislative Assembly.

As per Chapter V of TPHRA, 1993 (with amendment act 2006) commission is headed by a Chairperson who has been a Chief Justice of a High Court along with an active Member who is, or has been, a Judge of a High Court or District Judge in the State with minimum seven year experience as a District Judge, assisted by another expert member on the matters of human rights.

- Justice Aftab Hussain Saikia, former Chief Justice of the High Courts of Sikkim and Jammu & Kashmir assumed as the Chairperson on 1 December 2011
- Shri Tarun Phookan, Former District & Session's Judge who assumed charge as an active member on 16 December 2011
- Shri Jyoti Prasad Chaliha, assumed charge on 18 February 2008 also as an active member of the commission.
