= 2006 Delhi sealing drive =

The 2006 Delhi sealing drive was a campaign by the Municipal Corporation of Delhi (MCD) to close (and thus "seal" the locks of) a number of illegal commercial establishments in Delhi, India which lacked authorization. The drive witnessed considerable opposition from trading bodies in the city which led to the deaths of four people in September 2006. It ran until early 2007.

As of today, the Supreme Court of India has suspended the drive. The new plan envisions a mixed land use policy by which commercial and residential use can be simultaneous. However, the sealing drive in Delhi is very much in progress. Shops and establishments which were registered by the Municipal Corporation of Delhi under 24 specified categories were made to pay various charges though most of them have commercial electricity meters and some have approved commercial water meters. Almost all the shops had VAT registration and the owners were paying income tax through income from these shops. So all the shops which are running from residential areas and were not found on notified roads are being forcibly shut down.

== Opposition ==
=== Criticism of the government ===
The government of India has been reprimanded time and again by the courts for failing to conduct the drive properly: for making excuses such as the drive will create law and order problems, and for not proceeding against the big establishments but instead targeting small shops. Apparently the government has a way of solving the issue by putting in force the Delhi Master Plan 2021 which will allow mixed land use and thus make the commercial activity in residential area legal (a law which the court has declared invalid) out of judicial purview, but the government has as yet not given any indication that it plans to do so. This is probably because that would put the government in direct confrontation with the judiciary. One of the allegations put forward is that the government is not taking any initiative to stop the drive in order to promote shopping malls.

=== Court judgement ===
Reacting to several PILs, the Supreme Court has repeatedly reprimanded the government for improperly conducting the drive. After the government introduced a law to provide relief to the trading bodies, the court declared it invalid in response to another public interest litigation. The court has also struck down various petitions of the government suspending the drive.

Several traders' unions have argued that the action may have serious economic, social and psychological impact, and accused the government of not providing adequate alternate space required for shops and offices.

=== Improper conduct allegations against CJI Y.K. Sabharwal ===
Chief justice of the Supreme Court of India, Y.K. Sabharwal in March 2005 took over the demolition cases although they had not been assigned to him. In 2007, the paper Mid-Day revealed that Sabharwal's two sons Chetan and Nitin operated a real estate firm Pawan Impex, which after languishing for three years, suddenly attracted a 300-fold capitalization from the real-estate major BPTP around the same time that Sabharwal took over this case. As a result of the demolition of many well-established commercial offices across Delhi, the demand for mall spaces skyrocketed. In October 2005, Pawan Impex partnered with the promoters of Filatex India, and they went on to build the new Square One Mall luxury mall in Saket.

In a newspaper rebuttal, Justice Sabharwal addressed some other allegations, but failed to explain why he did not recuse himself from a case where his own sons may be said to have a direct interest.

In September 2007, four Mid-Day journalists were sentenced to four months imprisonment by the Delhi High Court for contempt of court (making such allegations about an ex-judge).

Vitusha Oberoi, an editor at Mid-day, said: "We have said that what we have said is the truth (in their articles relating to former Chief Justice of India Y K Sabharwal) and that is why we should not be hauled up for contempt."

== Timeline of the drive ==
The demolition and sealing drive was started in February 2006, and ran until early 2007. Some of the major events were as follows: On 16 February 2006, the Delhi High Court sent a notice to the MCD to remove all the commercial ventures in residential areas in the city. On 25 February, after some violent reactions the demolition activities were suspended. During 18 March through 21 March, traders protested the 26 March date for SC hearings and there was a call for a bandh.

On 24 March the SC extended the deadline to 28 March 2006 after seeing the tense situation in the capital. It ordered violating traders to submit affidavits stating that they would shut down their businesses or face action from 29 March. Over 40,000 traders filed the affidavits. On 29 March, under tight security, MCD started sealing the commercial establishments whose owners had failed to file affidavits before the deadline set by the court.

On 25 April, the union urban development minister, Jaipal Reddy, said that the central government would provide a bill concerning regularisation of commercial establishments. MCD announced the end of the sealing drive on 20 May after the central government introduced a bill to suspend the action of municipal authorities. President Kalam gave his assent to the bill to make it law on 21 May, and on 23 May the MCD started desealing shops in the capital.

In response to a petition moved jointly by the Delhi Residents Welfare Associations Front and an NGO Citizens Forum, which alleged that the new legislation was politically motivated in advance of the coming municipal elections, and was illegal, the SC issued notices to the centre and the MCD on 23 May.

The SC termed the new law, which was putting a moratorium on demolitions and sealings in the capital, as invalid on 10 August. The court also ordered the MCD to restart sealing in the capital. The MCD resumed the sealing of shops in residential areas on 1 September, after a gap of three months. The All Delhi Traders Association filed a petition in the SC demanding the implementation of the Delhi Special Provisions Act that suspended the demolitions for a year. The monitoring committee appointed by the SC in consultation with the MCD decided that no day-to-day-need shops would be sealed.

In another effort to avoiding a confrontation with either the judiciary or the protesting trading bodies, the Delhi government's Delhi Development Authority (DDA) made several amendments to the 2001 Delhi Master Plan on 7 September. According to the proposed amendments:

1. Professionals could use their basements as offices, except in 70 upmarket localities.
2. MCD or government-recognised pre-primary schools would not be sealed.
3. Commercial activity would be permitted in Delhi's 350 villages, except polluting or hazardous units.

The amendments however offered no relief to Delhi's upmarket areas.

MCD expanded its sealing drive on 19 September; traders protested at nearly 100 locations across the city. The SC refused to stay the sealing drive. Four people died in police shootings after the bandh called by the traders in Delhi turned violent on 20 September. On 21 September the Prime Minister, Manmohan Singh, set up a Group of Ministers (GoM) to look into the issues pertaining to sealing in Delhi. The MCD suspended all sealing operations in the capital for the time being, following the violence. It said it wanted more security to carry out the sealing drive.

On 29 September the SC declared that there would be no sealing of shops or commercial establishments till 31 October after which it would resume. The court also asked the owners of the illegal shops to submit affidavits stating that their businesses were being run on illegal premises. The court also clarified that it would not tolerate the government's continued attempts to pass new laws that dilute its orders to remove shops in residential areas.

On 18 October the Supreme Court further extended, till 31 January 2007, the last date for filing of affidavits by traders in the capital who were using residential premises for commercial activities for those who had not done so and thus in a way temporarily postponed the sealing of their shops. Sealing was however not stopped for the 44,000 traders who had already submitted the affidavits. On 25 October the Delhi Traders Association decided to intensify its protests against the sealing drive, which was scheduled to restart from 1 November. On 30 October, the traders started a three-day strike against the sealing drive.

On 31 October the traders tried to resolve the case and meet Jaipal Reddy and Delhi chief minister Sheila Dikshit.

On 1 November the centre moved the SC seeking relief for the 44,000 traders in Delhi who were facing sealing. The centre told the Supreme Court's monitoring committee that sealings could not go on because the law and order situation could not be handled. They claimed that protests were threatening to become extremely violent, and could seriously affect the whole city.

On 2 November the SC decided to hear the sealing case on 6 November. The GoM decided not to carry out any sealing operations until 6 November. On 3 November, the MCD approached the SC with a fresh petition asking for an indefinite postponement of sealing, citing the law and order situation. The Delhi Police added that it needed reinforcements to deal with the law and order situation, which it would only have by 6 November.

On 6 November the SC refused to grant any relief to traders from the sealing drive. The court dismissed applications of the Centre, Delhi government and the MCD, seeking relief for the traders. A meeting of the GoM decided that the SC's order on sealing would be implemented. After this statement, traders announced that they would hold a 24-hour bandh in Delhi on 7 November and then decide their future course of action.

On 7 November the traders protested against the Supreme Court's order to resume the sealing drive by holding a one-day strike. On 8 November the MCD restarted the drive amidst protests. 25 companies of paramilitary forces are deployed in New Delhi to assist in sealing drive. On 9 November the Telecom Regulatory Authority of India's office was sealed as it was operating from a posh residential colony.

On 27 November the government said that a master plan for Delhi, addressing all of its civic problems, would be finalised by January 2007.ndtv.com

On 4 December traders held a 'Sealing Chetna Week' (Sealing Awareness Week) against the sealing drive.

On 18 December the showrooms of several top designers were sealed in the Ambawata complex mall near Qutub Minar in South Delhi.

On 24 January, the government filed a petition in the Supreme Court seeking to finish the drive as according to it the decisions passed by the court would become irrelevant once the Delhi Master Plan came into force in February 2007. (The plan allowed mixed land use in various circumstances according to which land can be used both for commercial and residential purposes.)

On 31 January thousands of traders filed affidavits that they would abide by the court's verdict as demanded by the SC even as the government claimed that the soon to be notified Delhi Master Plan would finish off the drive. The new Master Plan allowed far more liberal guidelines for construction and commercial development. Shops on streets across Delhi, that were forced to shut down, would have the right to reopen if they could provide parking. Under the new Masterplan, an extra floor could be added and the landlord could rent out each floor if he provided parking of two cars. Fifty per cent of the house could be used for an office and so could the basement.

On 7 February, confusion prevailed on the issue as the government said that due to the provisions in the Master Plan there was no need for sealing. The SC appointed monitoring committee had demanded that sealing should continue. On 8 February the Delhi Master Plan was notified which identified a mixed land use policy according to which shops on over 2000 roads could function. The SC said that sealing should be suspended until 12 February. On 9 February an NGO, The Delhi Pradesh Citizen Council, challenged the Masterplan in the Supreme Court saying that it is a move only to appease the traders ahead of incoming municipal elections. On 13 February the Supreme Court stayed the sealing of commercial establishments in residential areas on 2,183 roads covered by the Master Plan Delhi-2021 until the issuing of further orders.
