= Binod Kumar Roy =

10th Chief Justice of Sikkim High Court

Hon'ble Chief Justice (Retd.) Binod Kumar Roy

10th Chief Justice of Sikkim High Court
- In office 30 September 2005 – 26 December 2006
- Nominated by: R. C. Lahoti
- Appointed by: A. P. J. Abdul Kalam
- Preceded by: Radha Krishna Patra; N. Surajmani Singh (acting)
- Succeeded by: Ajoy Nath Ray; N. Surajmani Singh (acting)

29th Chief Justice of Gauhati High Court
- In office 21 May 2005 – 29 September 2005
- Nominated by: R. C. Lahoti
- Appointed by: A. P. J. Abdul Kalam
- Preceded by: P. P. Naolekar; Dinendra Biswas (acting)
- Succeeded by: B. Sudarshan Reddy; Dinendra Biswas (acting)

25th Chief Justice of Punjab & Haryana High Court
- In office 14 October 2002 – 21 February 2005
- Appointed by: A. P. J. Abdul Kalam
- Preceded by: Arun B. Saharya; G. S. Singhvi (acting)
- Succeeded by: Devinder Kumar Jain; G. S. Singhvi (acting); H. S. Bedi (acting)

Judge of Allahabad High Court
- In office 28 April 1994 – 13 October 2002
- Nominated by: M. N. Venkatachaliah
- Appointed by: S. D. Sharma

Judge of Patna High Court
- In office 31 October 1988 – 27 April 1994
- Nominated by: R. S. Pathak
- Appointed by: R. Venkataraman

Personal details
- Born: 26 December 1944
- Died: 20 June 2019 (aged 74) Patna, Bihar
- Relations: Ravi Ranjan (son-in-law)
- Education: Patna College, Magadh University (LL.B)

Binod Kumar Roy (26 December 1944 – 20 June 2019) was an Indian Judge and former Chief Justice of three High Courts of India.

== Career ==
Roy was born in 1944. He studied in Patna College and passed LL.B from Magadh University. He started his career in the Patna High Court as an advocate. Roy was elevated as a Judge of the Patna High Court on 31 October 1988. In April 1994 he was transferred to the Allahabad High Court. Roy became the Chief Justice of Punjab and Haryana High Court on 14 October 2002. He was subsequently moved to the Gauhati High Court and served there as the Chief Justice. On 30 September 2005, Justice Roy became the Chief Justice of the Sikkim High Court after retirement of Justice Radha Krishna Patra. He retired as a judge on 27 December 2006. He died on 20 June 2019 after prolonged illness.

== Controversy and transfer ==
The unprecedented 2004 institutional crisis at the Punjab & Haryana High Court erupted on 19 April 2004, when 25 sitting judges went on an extraordinary mass casual leave to revolt against Chief Justice Roy, completely paralyzing the state's highest court. The standoff began when Chief Justice Roy, acting as a strict institutional disciplinarian, demanded formal written explanations from senior judges who had accepted free, honorary memberships from the elite Forest Hill Golf and Country Resort, a luxury estate that was actively facing major environmental litigation before that very court. The dissenting judges took severe offense, arguing that a Chief Justice is merely first among equals rather than a disciplinary authority, prompting a total breakdown of internal communication where judges began boycotting administrative duties. The crisis went public when Chief Justice Roy gave a televised interview accusing judges of bypassing decorum by calling the court registrar to pull specific, high-stakes cases into their courtrooms without his knowledge.

The public spectacle drew national alarm, prompting President A. P. J. Abdul Kalam to express deep distress over the erosion of public trust, while Chief Justice of India V. N. Khare summoned three senior most judges of Punjab & Haryana High Court G. S. Singhvi, V. K. Bali and H. S. Bedi and sharply reprimanded the striking judges in New Delhi for indefensible judicial impropriety. To restore administrative order and defuse the explosive tension, the Supreme Court Collegium executed a massive institutional reshuffle, transferring Chief Justice Roy to head the Gauhati High Court and Justice Singhvi to Gujarat High Court and systematically shifting the ringleaders of the protest to various other High Courts across India, leaving the incident as a permanent landmark case study on the fragile boundary between judicial ethics and internal hierarchy.

Roy's transfer spree was not ended here, in Gauhati High Court too 15 of the 17 of his colleagues on the bench as well as 151 lawyers has written formal complaint against roy's manner of conducting High Court proceedings and perceived high handedness. Supreme court collegium again transferred him out of Gauhati High Court and sent to Sikkim High Court, smallest high court in India with sanctioned strength of 3 including chief justice.

The transfer sparked an intense debate on judicial accountability within legal circles. While factions of the Bar in Chandigarh and Guwahati complained about his rigid and high-handed management style, many legal columnists and purists defended him. They argued that Justice Roy was an incorruptible judge paying a heavy career price precisely because he was unwilling to compromise on ethics, particularly regarding his initial crack-down on judges accepting corrupt golf resort memberships.

Ultimately, Justice Roy accepted the assignment quietly. He assumed charge as Chief Justice of the Sikkim High Court on 30 September 2005, and served out a peaceful, conflict-free final tenure in Gangtok until his standard constitutional retirement on 27 December 2006.
