= Radha Krishna Patra =

Indian Judge

Hon'ble Chief Justice (Retd.) Radha Krishna Patra
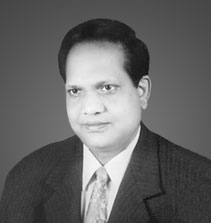

2nd Chairman of Odisha Human Rights Commission
- In office 2 January 2008 – 23 November 2012
- Appointed by: M. C. Bhandare
- Preceded by: D. P. Mohapatra
- Succeeded by: Bimala Prasad Das

9th Chief Justice of Sikkim High Court
- In office 9 July 2003 – 23 November 2004
- Nominated by: V. N. Khare
- Appointed by: A. P. J. Abdul Kalam
- Preceded by: Repusudan Dayal; N. Surajmani Singh (acting)
- Succeeded by: Binod Kumar Roy; N. Surajmani Singh (acting)

Judge of Orissa High Court
- In office 22 June 1992 – 8 July 2003
- Nominated by: M. H. Kania
- Appointed by: R. Venkataraman
- Acting Chief Justice
- In office 25 September 2001 – 4 December 2001
- Appointed by: K. R. Narayanan
- Preceded by: N. Y. Hanumanthappa
- Succeeded by: P. K. Balasubramanyan
- In office 19 October 2000 – 16 February 2001
- Appointed by: K. R. Narayanan
- Preceded by: Biswanath Agrawal
- Succeeded by: N. Y. Hanumanthappa
- In office 21 September 1999 – 17 November 1999
- Appointed by: K. R. Narayanan
- Preceded by: S. N. Phukan; Susanta Chatterjee (acting); A. Pasayat (acting)
- Succeeded by: Biswanath Agrawal

Personal details
- Born: 24 November 1942
- Died: 28 January 2015 (aged 72) SCB Medical College, Cuttack
- Education: LL.B

Radha Krishna Patra (24 November 1942—28 January 2015) was an Indian judge who had served as 9th Chief Justice of the Sikkim High Court and judge of the Orissa High Court.

== Career ==
Patra was enrolled as an advocate in 1966 and started practice in the Orissa High Court on Civil, Criminal, Revenue, Constitutional and Taxation matters. He served as Standing Counsel in Orissa High Court since 1974. Patra worked there as a Government advocate.

On 22 June 1992 he was appointed an Additional Judge of Orissa High Court and was made permanent on 16 September 1994. In Orissa High Court he served as acting chief justice on three different occasions in 1999, 2000 and 2001. He was elevated to the post of Chief Justice of the Sikkim High Court on 9 July 2003 and retired on 23 November 2004. After the retirement Justice Patra was appointed the Chairperson of Odisha Human Rights Commission. He led the Commission of Enquiry for the multi crore chit fund scam in the state of Odisha.
