= Darkuchi =

- Village
- Location in Baksa, India Darkuchi (India)
- Coordinates: 26.4045°N 91.38425°E
- Country: India
- State: Assam
- District: Kamrup
- Elevation: 46 m (151 ft)

Languages
- Time zone: UTC+5:30 (IST)
- PIN: 781376
- Vehicle registration: AS

Darkuchi is a village in Baksa district of Assam, situated on the north bank of the Brahmaputra River.

== Transportation ==
Darkuchi is near National Highway 31 and is well connected to nearby towns with different modes of transport.

== See also ==
- Dampur
