= Ashok Kumar Mathur =

Indian judge (born 1943)

Judge of the Supreme Court of India
- In office 7 June 2004 – 7 August 2008
- Appointed by: A. P. J. Abdul Kalam

Chief Justice of the Calcutta High Court
- In office 22 December 1999 – 6 June 2004
- Preceded by: Prabha Shankar Mishra
- Succeeded by: V. S. Sirpurkar

Chief Justice of Madhya Pradesh High Court

Personal details
- Born: 7 August 1943 (age 83)
- Education: University of Rajasthan

Ashok Kumar Mathur (born 7 August 1943) is retired judge of the Supreme Court of India and a former chief justice of Calcutta High Court and of Madhya Pradesh High Court. He was appointed the chairman of Armed Forces Tribunal, and chairman of the 7th Central Pay Commission. He also conducted a court of inquiry in the Boeing crash at Ahmedabad in 1988.

== Early life ==
Ashok Mathur completed his Master of Arts degree in Philosophy from Rajasthan University in 1964 and passed his Bachelor of Laws in 1966. He is

== Career ==
Ashok Mathur started his legal career in the Rajasthan High Court in 1967. Initially he worked as Government Advocate. He was elevated as a Judge on 13 July 1985 of the Rajasthan High Court. He also conducted a court of inquiry in Boeing crash at Ahmedabad in 1987–88. He was transferred from Rajasthan High Court to Madhya Pradesh High Court in February 1994 and was elevated as the chief justice of Madhya Pradesh High Court. Then he was transferred to Calcutta High Court as chief justice on 22 December 1999. Ashok Mathur became a judge of the Supreme Court in 2004 and retired from service on 7 August 2008 from there. After the retirement, he was appointed the Chairman of the Armed Forces Tribunal and also headed the 7th Central Pay Commission (CPC).
