= Satish K. Agnihotri =

Indian judge

Satish K. Agnihotri (born 1 July 1956) is a former Chief Justice of Sikkim High Court. Earlier he has served as a judge of the Madras High Court at Chennai, Tamil Nadu and previously as the judge of Chhattisgarh High Court at Bilaspur, Chhattisgarh.

He was sworn in by Acting Chief Justice R.K. Agarwal on 26 September 2013 as a judge of the Madras High Court.

On 13 February 2014, he assumed the charge as the acting Chief Justice of the Madras High Court. On 22 September 2016, Agnihotri took charge as the Chief Justice of the Sikkim High Court after Justice Sunil Kumar Sinha.
