= Sunil Kumar Sinha =

Indian Judge

Sunil Kumar Sinha (born 7 July 1954) is an Indian judge and former Chief Justice of the Sikkim High Court.

== Career ==
Sinha was born at Ambikapur in 1954 in a lawyer family. He studied in Government Multipurpose Higher Secondary School, Ambikapur and passed LL.B. in 1980 from Government P.G. College of Ambikapur. He was enrolled as an advocate under Madhya Pradesh Bar Council on 3 September 1980. Initially, he started practice in District Court of Ambikapur, later in the Madhya Pradesh High Court. In May 2003, Sinha was appointed an Additional Advocate General of Chhattisgarh. On 1 December 2004, he became a permanent judge of the Chhattisgarh High Court. On 14 July 2014, Sinha was transferred as a judge of the Sikkim High Court and on 30 March 2015 he was elevated to the post of the Chief Justice of the Sikkim High Court.
