= Dampur =

Dampur Dampur
- Village
- Location in Kamrup, India Dampur (India)
- Coordinates: 26.73°N 91.06°E
- Country: India
- State: Assam
- District: Kamrup

Government
  - Body: Gram panchayat
- Elevation: 46 m (151 ft)

Population (30, 550 (2011))
  - Total: 30,550 (almost)
  - Rank: 1 st (in Assam)

Town area
- Time zone: UTC+5:30 (IST)
- PIN: 781102
- Vehicle registration: AS

Dampur is a village in Kamrup district of Assam, situated on the north bank of the Brahmaputra River. Dampur is a Big village in Assam, India. This village has 99% Muslim majority and Almost 25-35 mosque in this village. The people depend on agriculture and government jobs. Dampur is situated 25-30 km from Jalukbari, Guwahati. This village has 4-5 Islamic religious schools and one higher secondary school, 15 primary schools, one Fa. Saikia girls' high school, 5-6 private schools, one boys' school, and one madrasa high school.

== Transportation ==
Dampur is connected to nearby towns like Guwahati through National Highway 31.

== See also ==
- Darkuchi
