= Sikkim High Court =

High Court for the Indian State of Sikkim

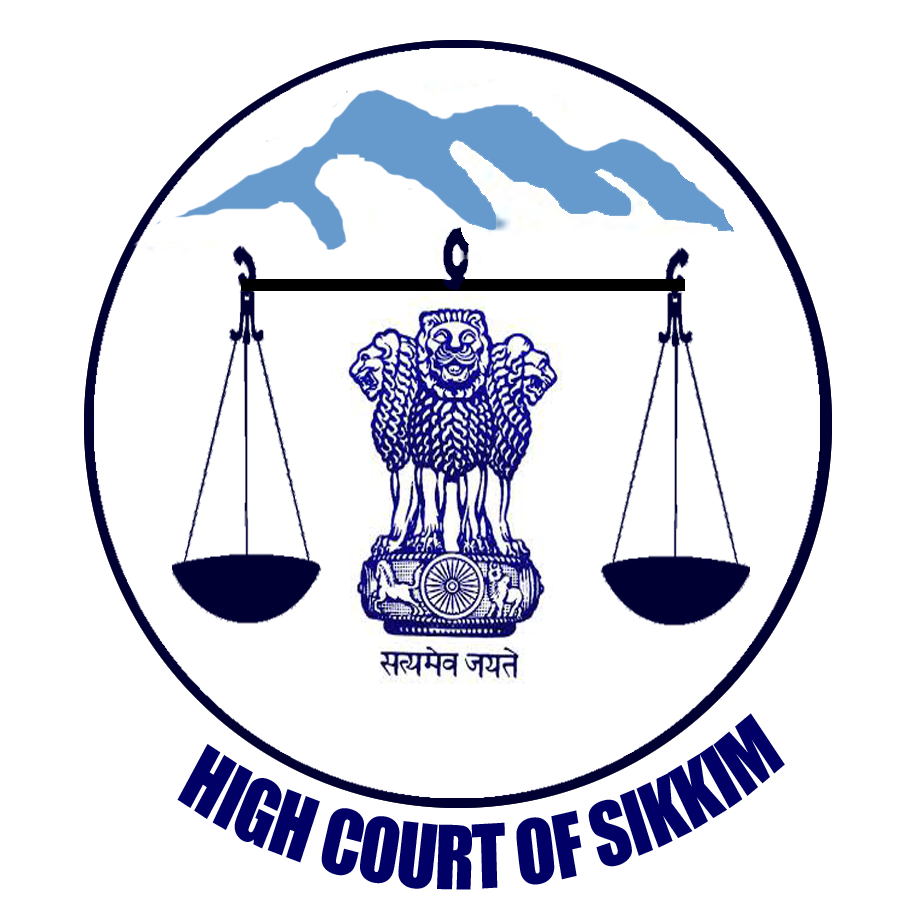
- Emblem of Sikkim High Court
- Interactive map of Sikkim High Court
- 27.3319°N 88.6146°E
- Established: 16 May 1975; 51 years ago
- Jurisdiction: Sikkim
- Location: Gangtok
- Coordinates: 27.3319°N 88.6146°E
- Composition method: Presidential with confirmation of Chief Justice of India and Governor of respective state.
- Authorised by: Constitution of India
- Appeals to: Supreme Court of India
- Judge term length: Mandatory retirement by age of 62
- Number of positions: 3
- Website: hcs.gov.in/hcs/

Chief Justice
- Currently: Justice A. Muhamed Mustaque
- Since: 19 December 2025

The Sikkim High Court is the High Court of the Indian state of Sikkim. The history of the court can be traced back to 1955, when the High Court of Judicature (Jurisdiction and Powers) Proclamation, 1955 was issued to establish a High Court in Sikkim. Upon merger, Sikkim became the 22nd State of India. Under Clause (i) of Article 371F, the High Court functioning immediately prior to the date of merger became the High Court for the State of Sikkim under the Constitution like any other High Court in the country. It was established in 1975.

The seat of the court is at Gangtok, the administrative capital of the state. With a sanctioned court strength of three judges, the Sikkim High Court is the smallest High Court of India.

== Chief Justices ==
#	Chief Justice	Parent high court	Assumed office	Left office	Term length	Appointer
–	Justice Rajinder Sachar (acting)	Delhi High Court	16 May 1975	6 May 1976	356 days	Fakhruddin Ali Ahmed
1	Justice Man Mohan Singh Gujral	Punjab and Haryana High Court	7 May 1976	14 March 1983	6 years, 311 days	Fakhruddin Ali Ahmed
–	Justice Anandamoy Bhattacharjee (acting)	Sikkim High Court	15 March 1983	16 December 1983	276 days	Zail Singh
2	Justice Mohan Lall Shrimal	Rajasthan High Court	17 December 1983	3 January 1985	1 year, 17 days	Zail Singh
–	Justice Anandamoy Bhattacharjee (acting)	Sikkim High Court	4 January 1985	20 January 1986	1 year, 16 days	Zail Singh
3	Justice Jugal Kishore Mohanty	Orissa High Court	21 January 1986	4 January 1989	2 years, 349 days	Zail Singh
–	Justice Repusudan Dayal (acting)	Sikkim High Court	5 January 1989	19 January 1990	1 year, 14 days	R. Venkataraman
4	Justice Braja Nath Mishra	Orissa High Court	20 January 1990	8 November 1992	2 years, 293 days	R. Venkataraman
–	Justice Repusudan Dayal (acting)	Sikkim High Court	9 November 1992	19 January 1993	71 days	Shankar Dayal Sharma
5	Justice Surendra Nath Bhargava	Rajasthan High Court	20 January 1993	10 February 1996	3 years, 21 days	Shankar Dayal Sharma
6	Justice Krishna Murari Agarwal	Madhya Pradesh High Court	15 February 1996	26 October 1996	254 days	Shankar Dayal Sharma
–	Justice Malay Sengupta (acting)	Calcutta High Court	27 October 1996	26 August 1997	303 days	Shankar Dayal Sharma
7	Justice Kanniappa Arumuga Thanikkachallam	Madras High Court	27 August 1997	26 September 1997	30 days	K. R. Narayanan
–	Justice Malay Sengupta (acting)	Calcutta High Court	27 September 1997	26 December 1997	303 days	K. R. Narayanan
–	Justice Anup Deb (acting)	Sikkim High Court	27 December 1997	2 February 1999	1 year, 128 days	K. R. Narayanan
8	Justice Repusudan Dayal	Sikkim High Court	3 February 1999	17 May 2003	4 years, 103 days	K. R. Narayanan
–	Justice Nongthomban Surjamani Singh (acting)	Gauhati High Court	18 May 2003	8 July 2003	51 days	A. P. J. Abdul Kalam
9	Justice Radha Krishna Patra	Orissa High Court	9 July 2003	23 November 2004	1 year, 137 days	A. P. J. Abdul Kalam
–	Justice Nongthomban Surjamani Singh (acting)	Gauhati High Court	24 November 2004	29 September 2005	309 days	A. P. J. Abdul Kalam
10	Justice Binod Kumar Roy	Patna High Court	30 September 2005	26 December 2006	1 year, 87 days	A. P. J. Abdul Kalam
–	Justice Nongthomban Surjamani Singh (acting)	Gauhati High Court	27 December 2006	26 January 2007	30 days	A. P. J. Abdul Kalam
11	Justice Ajoy Nath Ray	Calcutta High Court	27 January 2007	30 October 2008	1 year, 277 days	A. P. J. Abdul Kalam
–	Justice Ananda Prakash Subba (acting)	Sikkim High Court	31 October 2008	6 March 2009	126 days	Pratibha Patil
12	Justice Aftab Hussain Saikia	Gauhati High Court	7 March 2009	7 April 2010	1 year, 31 days	Pratibha Patil
13	Justice Barin Ghosh	Calcutta High Court	13 April 2010	6 August 2010	115 days	Pratibha Patil
14	Justice Paul Daniel Dinakaran Premkumar	Madras High Court	9 August 2010	29 July 2011	354 days	Pratibha Patil
–	Justice Sonam Phintso Wangdi (acting)	Sikkim High Court	30 July 2011	11 December 2011	134 days	Pratibha Patil
15	Justice Permod Kohli	Jammu and Kashmir High Court	12 December 2011	28 February 2013	1 year, 78 days	Pratibha Patil
–	Justice Sonam Phintso Wangdi (acting)	Sikkim High Court	1 March 2013	27 March 2013	26 days	Pranab Mukherjee
16	Justice Pius C. Kuriakose	Kerala High Court	28 March 2013	1 October 2013	187 days	Pranab Mukherjee
–	Justice Narendra Kumar Jain (acting)	Rajasthan High Court	2 October 2013	6 January 2014	96 days	Pranab Mukherjee
17	Justice Narendra Kumar Jain	Rajasthan High Court	7 January 2014	7 October 2014	273 days	Pranab Mukherjee
–	Justice Sunil Kumar Sinha (acting)	Chhattisgarh High Court	8 October 2014	29 March 2015	172 days	Pranab Mukherjee
18	Justice Sunil Kumar Sinha	Chhattisgarh High Court	30 March 2015	6 July 2016	1 year, 98 days	Pranab Mukherjee
–	Justice Satish Kumar Agnihotri (acting)	Madhya Pradesh High Court	7 July 2016	21 September 2016	2 years, 76 days	Pranab Mukherjee
19	Justice Satish Kumar Agnihotri	Madhya Pradesh High Court	22 September 2016	30 June 2018	1 year, 281 days	Pranab Mukherjee
–	Justice Meenakshi Madan Rai (acting)	Sikkim High Court	1 July 2018	29 October 2018	120 days	Ram Nath Kovind
20	Justice Vijay Kumar Bist	Uttarakhand High Court	30 October 2018	16 September 2019	321 days	Ram Nath Kovind
–	Justice Meenakshi Madan Rai (acting)	Sikkim High Court	17 September 2019	14 October 2019	27 days	Ram Nath Kovind
21	Justice Arup Kumar Goswami	Gauhati High Court	15 October 2019	5 January 2021	1 year, 82 days	Ram Nath Kovind
22	Justice Jitendra Kumar Maheshwari	Madhya Pradesh High Court	6 January 2021	31 August 2021	237 days	Ram Nath Kovind
–	Justice Meenakshi Madan Rai (acting)	Sikkim High Court	1 September 2021	11 October 2021	40 days	Ram Nath Kovind
23	Justice Biswanath Somadder	Calcutta High Court	12 October 2021	14 December 2025	4 years, 63 days	Ram Nath Kovind
–	Justice Meenakshi Madan Rai (acting)	Sikkim High Court	15 December 2025	18 December 2025	3 days	Droupadi Murmu
24	Justice A. Muhamed Mustaque	Kerala High Court	19 December 2025	Incumbent	301 days	Droupadi Murmu

== Judges elevated as Chief Justices ==
This sections contains list of only those judges elevated as chief justices whose parent high court is Sikkim. This includes those judges who, at the time of appointment as chief justice, may not be serving in Sikkim High Court but this list does not include judges who at the time of appointment as chief justice were serving in Sikkim High Court but does not have Sikkim as their Parent High Court.

Colour Key

- Female Chief Justice
- Served as Chief Justice of India

Symbol Key

- ^{‡} Elevated to Supreme Court of India
- ^{RES} Resigned
- ^{†} Died in office

Name	Image	Appointed as CJ in HC of	Date of appointment		Date of retirement (Note: this includes date of resignation, death and elevation to supreme court)	Tenure		Ref..
Name	Image	Appointed as CJ in HC of	As Judge	As Chief Justice	Date of retirement	As Chief Justice	As Judge (Note: also includes tenure as Chief Justice)	Ref..
Anandamoy Bhattacharjee		Calcutta, transferred to Bombay	16 June 1976	25 January 1993	1 April 1995^{[RES]}	2 years, 67 days	18 years, 290 days	
Repusudan Dayal		Sikkim	10 May 1984	3 February 1999	17 May 2003	4 years, 104 days	19 years, 8 days	
Meenakshi Madan Rai		Patna	15 April 2015	5 June 2026	11 July 2026	37 days	11 years, 88 days	

=== Judges appointed as Acting Chief Justice ===
Name	Appointed as ACJ in HC of	Date of appointment as Judge	Period as Acting Chief Justice	Date of retirement	Tenure as ACJ	Tenure as Judge	Remarks	Ref..
A. M. Bhattacharjee	Sikkim	16 June 1976	14 March 1983 – 16 December 1983	1 April 1995^{[RES]}	278 days	18 years, 290 days	--	
A. M. Bhattacharjee	Sikkim	16 June 1976	4 January 1985 – 20 January 1986	1 April 1995^{[RES]}	1 year, 17 days	18 years, 290 days	--	
A. M. Bhattacharjee	Calcutta	16 June 1976	15 June 1992 – 24 January 1993	1 April 1995^{[RES]}	224 days	18 years, 290 days	Became permanent	
Repusudan Dayal	Sikkim	10 May 1984	5 January 1989 – 19 January 1990	17 May 2003	1 year, 15 days	19 years, 8 days	--	
Repusudan Dayal	Sikkim	10 May 1984	9 November 1992 – 19 January 1993	17 May 2003	72 days	19 years, 8 days	--	
Anup Deb	Sikkim	16 December 1994	27 December 1997 – 2 February 1999	12 March 2002^{[†]}	1 year, 38 days	7 years, 87 days	--	
Ananda Prakash Subba	Sikkim	4 October 2004	31 October 2008 – 6 March 2009	28 February 2010	127 days	5 years, 148 days	--	
Sonam Phinsto Wangdi	Sikkim	23 June 2009	30 July 2011 – 11 December 2011	24 October 2015	135 days	6 years, 124 days	--	
Sonam Phinsto Wangdi	Sikkim	23 June 2009	1 March 2013 – 27 March 2013	24 October 2015	27 days	6 years, 124 days	--	
M. M. Rai	Sikkim	15 April 2015	1 July 2018 – 29 October 2018	11 July 2026	121 days	11 years, 88 days	--	
M. M. Rai	Sikkim	15 April 2015	17 September 2019 – 14 October 2019	11 July 2026	28 days	11 years, 88 days	--	
M. M. Rai	Sikkim	15 April 2015	1 September 2021 – 11 October 2021	11 July 2026	41 days	11 years, 88 days	--	
M. M. Rai	Sikkim	15 April 2015	15 December 2025 – 3 January 2026	11 July 2026	20 days	11 years, 88 days	--	

== See also ==
- List of high courts in India
