= Sikkim State Human Rights Commission =

Human right commission of State of India

Sikkim State Human Rights Commission सिक्किम राज्य मानव अधिकार आयोग

Agency overview
- Formed: 18 October 2008 (Notification: 101/HOME/2008)
- Preceding agency: National Human Rights Commission of India

Jurisdictional structure
- Federal agency: India
- Operations jurisdiction: India
- Area: 7,096 km^{2} (2,740 sq mi)
- Population: 607,688 (2011)
- Constituting instrument: TPHRA, 1993
- General nature: Federal law enforcement

Operational structure
- Headquarters: Gangtok, Sikkim
- Agency executives: Justice Narendra Kumar Jain, Chairperson; Mrs. Lakchung Sherpa, Secretary

Website
- Official website

Sikkim State Human Rights Commission was constituted on 18 October 2008 vied notification No. 101/HOME/2008. Thereafter, Justice A.N. Ray, a former Chief Justice, Sikkim High Court of was appointed as the Chairperson vide Notification No. 106/HOME/2008 on 14 November 2008.

== Functions ==
According to TPHRA, 1993 (with amendment act 2006), The Commission is entitled to perform any of the following functions:

- Autonomously investigate on a petition filed by a victim or any person on his/her behalf as a complaint of

1. Violation of human rights and instigation or
2. Negligence in the prevention of such violations by any public servant.

- Get involved in any proceeding under allegation or violation of human right pending before a court with the approval of that court.
- Inspect living conditions of the inmates in any jail or any other institution under the control of the State Government where persons are detained or lodged for purposes of treatment, reformation or protection.
- Review the safeguards provided in the constitution or any other law for the time it is in force to ensure the protection of human rights
- Review the factors that inhibit the enjoyment of human rights
- Undertake and promote research and awareness programs in the field of human right
- Promote human right awareness through literacy campaigns, publications, seminars etc. for the protection and safeguards available under human rights practices.
- Encourage involvement of Non-Government Organizations and individuals for expansion work in the field of human rights awareness.
- Perform any other functions that may be considered necessary for the promotion of human rights.

It is clarified that though the Commission has the power to inquire in violation of human rights (or instigation thereof) by a public servant. Instances where the human rights are violated by a private citizen, the Commission can intervene if there is failure or negligence on the part of a public servant to prevent any such violation.
