= Yogesh Kumar Sabharwal =

36th Chief Justice of India

36th Chief Justice of India
- In office 1 November 2005 – 14 January 2007
- Appointed by: A.P.J. Abdul Kalam
- Preceded by: R.C. Lahoti
- Succeeded by: K.G. Balakrishnan

Judge of Supreme Court of India
- In office 28 January 2000 – 31 October 2005
- Nominated by: Adarsh Sein Anand
- Appointed by: K. R. Narayanan

31st Chief Justice of Bombay High Court
- In office 3 February 1999 – 27 January 2000
- Nominated by: Adarsh Sein Anand
- Appointed by: K. R. Narayanan
- Preceded by: Manharlal Bhikhalal Shah
- Succeeded by: Bishweshwar Prasad Singh

Judge of Delhi High Court
- In office 17 November 1986 – 2 February 1999
- Nominated by: P. N. Bhagwati
- Appointed by: Zail Singh

Personal details
- Born: 14 January 1942
- Died: New Delhi, India
- Education: Ramjas College, Delhi; Faculty of Law, University of Delhi

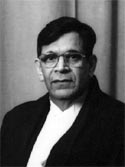
Chief Justice Sabharwal

Yogesh Kumar Sabharwal (14 January 1942 – 3 July 2015) was an Indian jurist, who served as the 36th Chief Justice of India.

== Career ==
Sabharwal worked as an advocate for Indian Railways from 1969 to 1981, as an advocate for Delhi administration from 1973 to 1976–1977, later as Additional Standing Counsel and then as Standing Counsel. He also served as counsel to the Central Government from 1980 to 1986. He represented Delhi in the Bar Council of India from 1969 to 1973.

He became an Additional Judge in the Delhi High Court on 17 November 1986 and a judge soon after.

On 3 February 1999, he was appointed Chief Justice of Bombay High Court. In less than a year, he was appointed a judge of the Supreme Court of India.

Being the senior-most judge of the Supreme Court of India at the time, Sabharwal was appointed the Chief Justice of India to succeed Justice R.C. Lahoti who was retiring on 31 October 2005. He was sworn in as the Chief Justice by the President of India, A P J Abdul Kalam on 1 November 2005 for a period of about 14 months as he would turn 65, the retirement age for Chief Justices, on 14 January 2007.

== Significant judgements ==
As a judge of the Supreme Court, he delivered several important judgements dealing with constitutional matters.

- A constitutional bench headed by Justice Sabharwal in October 2005 held as unconstitutional the dissolution of Bihar assembly on the basis of the report of Governor Buta Singh but refused to revert the action, thereby paving way for fresh elections.
- He headed the bench which refused to grant any relief in the 2006 Delhi sealing drive in which thousands of illegal constructions were demolished across Delhi. This became controversial after it was later found that his two sons were connected with the real estate business in Delhi.
- In 2007, he headed a nine judge constitution bench which ruled that all laws placed under the ninth schedule after 24 April 1973, shall be open to be challenged in court if they violate the fundamental rights guaranteed under Article 14, 19, 20 and 21 of the Constitution. This judgment was made in response to a number of petitions made on various laws including the Tamil Nadu Reservation Act, 1994.

Over the course of his Supreme Court tenure, Sabharwal authored 175 judgments and sat on 630 benches.

== Allegations of real estate operations by his sons ==
During the 2006 Delhi sealing drive, the Supreme Court under Sabharwal demonstrated extraordinary zeal in demolishing a large number of commercial properties which were illegally running in residential areas. There were very extensive protests every day, and considerable political pressure, due to which demolitions would often be hindered. The court monitored events and regularly reprimanded the Municipal Corporation of Delhi for its tardy progress. As a consequence of the extensive bulldozing of buildings, legal commercial properties, as in the new shopping malls, rose dramatically in price. Particularly, luxury store owners and other upscale businesses were very keen to get into the limited mall floor space.

In May 2007, five months after Sabharwal retired from the bench, the afternoon newspaper Mid-Day brought out a series of articles that presented documents showing that YK Sabharwal's sons, Chetan and Nitin Sabharwal, owned at least four small ventures, most of them oriented towards garment exports, but one in the construction arena. During Sabharwal's tenure as Chief justice, two of these firms suddenly attracted the interest of the very largest players in the shopping mall industry.

The first firm, Pawan Impex, Pvt Ltd, was registered for some time at Justice Sabharwal's official bungalow in the heart of Delhi, and later at his private house. Having the firm registered at his government-furnished house might have been illegal. In a newspaper editorial on 2 September 2007, Justice Sabharwal has said that he asked his sons to shift the registered address as soon as he found out about it, but in an interview recorded by Mid-Day in April 2007, after the shift, he claims complete ignorance about the matter.

More damaging is the fact that Pawan Impex, which had remained with a capitalization of 0.1 million Rs. since its founding in 2002, suddenly attracted the interest of Kabul and Anjali Chawla, owners of the large and rapidly growing real estate firm Business Park Town Planners (BPTP) which had promoted large malls like Park Centra (Gurgaon), Next Door (Faridabad), and the Parklands Shop-In Park (North Delhi). In June 2006, at the peak of the Supreme Court interest in the 2006 Delhi sealing drive, the Chawlas invested in Park Impex, raising the Share Capital 300 fold to Rs. 30 million, with equal shares between the original promoters and the Chawlas. Two months later, in August, the company obtained a loan of Rs. 280 million by a bank which happens to be a tenant of a BPTP property. These allegations appear to be well documented in a set of papers released by the Campaign for Judicial Accountability and were not addressed in Justice Sabharwal's public response, though he did mention that his sons were creating an IT Mall. After the partnership with BPTP in June 2007 Pawan Impex purchased 4 acres (16,000 m^{2}) of land in NOIDA on which this IT Mall is being constructed; Mid-Day reports it to be a Rs. 560 million project with 300,000 sq ft (28,000 m^{2}) saleable floor area.

A second firm, Harpawan Constructors, equally unknown, had also been promoted by the brothers. In October 2005, the promoters of Filatex India, a polyester yarn firm with a turnover of Rs. 3 billion in FY 2007, Purshottam and Madhu Sudan Bhageria, also the owners of real estate firm Fargo Estates, invested in Harpawan. Subsequently, the Bhagerias announced plans for developing the Square One, a mall devoted to luxury brands in Delhi. Justice Sabharwal has said that Purshottam Bhageria was his son's childhood friend, and that Harparwan Construction, despite its name, has not made any real estate or other investments.

The business of Chetan and Nitin expanded dramatically after 2005. Besides setting up several garment manufacturing factories, they have embarked on a massive real estate programme in NOIDA.

Possibly the largest project for Pawan Impex is the Rs. 560 million IT Mall being constructed in Noida. In the application to construct this mall, they had given the turnover and business of their company as "Nil". Their application for constructing this mall was approved rather mysteriously, given that in the application they had declared their company to be "Nil turnover" and "Nil business". An earlier applicant, Softedge Solutions, had been rejected on the grounds that they could not satisfactorily answer questions about their previous experience in IT and their technical tie up. But Pawan Impex represented by Chetan Sabharwal with Nil business, no previous track record in IT and no technical tie up, managed to obtain permission.

=== Conflict of interest charges ===
Whatever the facts of the case, it is widely felt that Justice Sabharwal's being active in such decisions when his sons were even partly involved in the Delhi real estate business lacked propriety, and that he should have recused himself from these cases. To the contrary, the Outlook magazine printed a report claiming that he had "called for and dealt with the sealing of commercial property cases in March 2005, though it [sic] was not assigned to him."

The actions have been condemned as being at best improper and at worst an attempt "to benefit his sons who entered into partnerships with shopping malls and developers of commercial complexes". Former Solicitor General KK Sud called this behaviour "the height of indiscretion."

In terms of the content of the charges, the most damaging aspect is the participation of the shopping mall construction giant BPTP in his son's export-import business. Both the Chawlas were on the board of the firm by early 2005, around the same time that Sabharwal started taking interest in the demolition drive. What is surprising is that while Justice Sabharwal in his justification addresses the other two (lesser) charges in some detail, he is completely silent about the BPTP connection.

== Jail term for two journalists, cartoonist, publisher ==
In September 2007, four Mid-Day journalists were sentenced to prison by the Delhi High Court for contempt of court (making such allegations about an ex-judge). The scribes said: "We stated facts in our stories. (in the articles relating to former Chief Justice of India Y K Sabharwal) and that is why we should not be hauled up for contempt. The laws in the country are outdated." The contempt laws in India do not rely on truth as the primary test for judging contempt. The columns were also somewhat tongue-in-cheek, accompanied also by a cartoon (the cartoonist has also been sentenced to four months in jail).

Justice R S Sodhi and Justice B N Chaturvedi of the Delhi High Court, in their judgement, said: "We feel, in this peculiar case, the contemnors have tarnished the image of the highest court and the sentence of four months' imprisonment would serve the justice." M K Tayal, senior journalist, said, "The judges did not go into the merits of the argument. They did not apply their minds while delivering the judgement.". "The Supreme Court in its judgement has clearly laid down the Laxman Rekha which we feel the publications have crossed." (The Laxman Rekha is a Ramayanic reference to a line that should not be crossed). However, the defendants had already processed their bail requests from the Supreme Court, and they were immediately released on bail. Tayal and three others are no more associated with Mid Day. It appears that the management of the newspaper compromised with Sabharwal and BPTP. Tayal, a former Indian army officer, objected Mid Day's policy of refraining from exposing more about the dealings of ex-CJI. Mid Day's MD Tariq Answari had written a note regarding the newspaper not carrying any more article on Sabharwal.

About the judgement, ex-law minister Shanti Bhushan stated that Parliament had in 2006 amended the Contempt of Courts Act to say that "if the allegations against a judge were found to be true, then they would not be considered contemptuous". In view of this, the judgement, he said, may be "only aimed at terrifying the media and an attempt to curb truthfulness."

== Death ==
Sabharwal died of a heart attack on 3 July 2015, aged 73. He was survived by two sons.

Legal offices
Preceded by Ramesh Chandra Lahoti	Chief Justice of India; 1 November 2005– 14 January 2007	Succeeded by K. G. Balakrishnan
