= Hosbet Suresh =

Indian judge (1929–2020)

- Born: 20 July 1929; Hosabettu, Surathkal, Karnataka
- Died: 11 June 2020 (aged 90)
- Occupation: Lawyer
- Known for: High court judge in Bombay

Hosbet Suresh (20 July 1929 – 11 June 2020) was a judge of the Bombay High Court who led a number of commissions that investigated human rights violations.

== Formal career ==
Suresh was born in Hosabettu, Surathkal, Karnataka on 20 July 1929. He attended Mangalore University for his B.A. and then the Visvesvaraya Technological University in Belgaum for his M.A. He went on to Bombay University to obtain his LL.M. On 30 November 1953, he enrolled as an Advocate of the Bombay High Court, practicing on both the appellate and the original sides of the court.

Between 1960-65 he was a part-time professor of Law at the Government Law College, Bombay. From 1965-68 he was a part-time professor of Law at K.C. Law College, Bombay. From 1967-68, Suresh was Assistant Government Pleader in the Bombay City Civil & Sessions Court. On 29 November 1968, he was appointed a judge of the Bombay City Court and Additional Sessions Judge, Greater Bombay. In October 1979, he was promoted to Second Additional Principal Judge of the Bombay City Civil & Sessions Court.

On 23 June 1980, he resigned from this position and began to practice as an advocate at the Bombay High Court. In 1982 he was designated Senior Advocate of the High Court. Returning to the judiciary, on 21 November 1986 Suresh took office as Additional Judge of the Bombay High Court, and on 12 June 1987 was appointed permanent Judge of the Bombay High Court. He retired from the High Court on 19 July 1991.

== Post-retirement ==
Suresh and Justice Tiwatia were appointing in December 1991 to investigate the Kaveri Riots in Bangalore. Suresh and Siraj Mehfuz Daud were appointed by the Indian People's Human Rights Commission to investigate the Bombay riots that had taken place in December 1992 and January 1993, publishing their findings in a 1993 report titled The People's Verdict. The report indicts the police, the government and political leaders. In August 1995 Suresh issued a report titled "Forced Evictions - An Indian People's Tribunal Enquiry into the Brutal Demolitions of Pavement and Slum Dwellers' Homes". The report documented the use of brutal and indiscriminate force against slum dwellers in Mumbai.

Suresh participated with retired justices Rajinder Sachar and Siraj Mehfuz Daud in an investigation by the Indian People's Human Rights Tribunal into a massive slum clearance drive in Mumbai, with the ostensible purpose of preserving the Sanjay Gandhi National Park. The demolitions on 22–23 January had been undertaken despite a notification from the state government to stay demolitions until September. The people had not been allowed to take the remains of their homes, which had been burnt. In August 2000 the judges, joined by former Supreme Court judge V. R. Krishna Iyer, held a two-day hearing into the clearances in which about 60,000 people had been evicted. The inquiry covered both legal aspects of the clearances and the human impact.

=== 2002 Gujarat Riots ===
Suresh and P.B. Sawant were members of an Indian People's Tribunal (IPT) fact-finding team headed by former Supreme Court of India judge V. R. Krishna Iyer that went to Gujarat in March and April 2002 following the communal riots triggered by the Godhra train attack. The tribunal gathered 2,094 oral and written testimonies and met with many senior police officers and government officials. Findings were documented in their report "Crime Against Humanity". In February 2012 Suresh said that on that visit the former state home minister Haren Pandya had told him and Sawant that Chief Minister Narendra Modi had told the police not to restrain the rioting Hindus. Pandya was murdered in March 2003. When he provided the information, which was recorded on audio tape, Pandya had asked the two judges not to reveal his name. In reaction to the mass killings in Gujarat, Suresh was one of the drafters of a proposed law "The Prevention of Genocide and Crimes against Humanity Act 2004". This would make Ministers and officials criminally responsible if they failed to exercise control in cases of mass violence against a group of citizens.

=== Public Food distribution system in Mumbai ===
Suresh headed an Indian People's Tribunal that inquired into the public food distribution system in Mumbai, releasing a report on the subject in March 2010. The HRLN and ANHAD conducted a Tribunal in Srinagar on 20–21 February 2010 that investigated human rights violations in the Kashmir Valley. Suresh headed the jury. A comprehensive report of the findings was released in New Delhi on 8 September 2010. The report documented excessive militarization, with one soldier for every twenty people. It found that the soldiers commit acts of violence against innocent people with impunity. Draconian laws are in place. The Armed Forces (Special Powers) Act, 1958, lets officers do whatever they feel is warranted with full protection against legal prosecution.

== Views ==
Speaking in 2008 after recent attacks on Mumbai residents Hosbet Suresh said: "Groups like this resort to violence at the drop of a hat these days. Such people are encouraged for electoral gains by those in powerful positions ... so they know nothing will happen to them". In November 2008 a scandal arose when thirty-three judges were alleged to be involved in embezzling court funds. Suresh commented: "It is unfortunate we have no law to remove a sitting judge if he is found incompetent or facing corruption charges. The media should freely report on corruption in the judiciary". In December 2009, in the context of a further scandal involving Justice P. D. Dinakaran, Suresh published a lengthy article in Outlook magazine calling for procedures to keep errant judges off the bench. He concluded that "...judicial integrity is not just a private virtue, but a public necessity. The situation demands action—not inaction".
