= Siraj Mehfuz Daud =

- Daud speaking at a seminar on 8 May 2006
- Born: 1 January 1931
- Died: 10 May 2010 (aged 79); Nagpur
- Occupation: Lawyer
- Known for: High court judge in Bombay

Siraj Mehfuz Daud, or S.M. Daud (1 January 1931 – 10 May 2010) was a lawyer who became a judge of the Bombay High Court, India. After retirement he participated in several tribunals investigating human rights problems.

== Career ==
Siraj Mehfuz Daud was born on 1 January 1931. He attended Nagpur University earning an M.A. in Political Science. He then obtained an LL.B. degree and served as a district pleader in Nagpur from 1951 to 1954. In September 1954 Daud became a Civil Judge, Junior Division and a Judicial Magistrate First Class at Amravati in the Vidarbha region. He was promoted to Assistant Judge in February 1968, to District Judge in August 1974, and Selection Grade District Judge in January 1982 . He also worked for the Government of Maharashtra as Deputy and Joint Secretary in the Mantralaya Law & Judicial Department. He was Registrar of the high court of Bombay from December 1982 to July 1985, when he was appointed to the bench of the high court, serving until January 1993.

== Post-retirement ==
After retiring, Justice Daud became a Senior Advocate working in the Supreme Court of India. Hosbet Suresh and Daud were appointed to investigate the Bombay riots that had taken place in December 1992 and January 1993, publishing their findings in a 1995 report titled The People's Verdict. Daud headed an Indian People's Tribunal Enquiry into the Proposed Maroli-Umbergaon Port Project (Gujarat), issuing a report in April 2000. He served on a tribunal of the International Human Rights Commission that inquired into communal rioting and other disturbance in Mumbai in 1992-93. After conducting this inquiry, S.M. Daud was invited to speak at a meeting of Muslims and social workers in September 2001. Rather than talk about the Shiv Sena and the police, who had been indicted in his report, he took the opportunity to harshly criticize his audience for complaining about abuses they had suffered but failing to speak out against abuses against other oppressed communities such as Dalits and Christians.

The Sardar Sarovar Dam project on the Narmada River in Gujarat was highly controversial, involving displacement of many people. In 1994 S.M. Daud visited the area and wrote a report for the Indian People's Tribunal. He described the indiscriminate arrests, beatings, confinements and prohibitory orders to which local opponents of the project were being subjected. He warned that unless these abuses ceased the victims could take to arms. He participated with retired justices Rajendra Sachar and Hosbet Suresh in an investigation by the Indian People's Human Rights Tribunal into a massive slum clearance drive in Mumbai, with the ostensible purpose of preserving the Sanjay Gandhi National Park. In August 2000 the judges, joined by former Supreme Court judge V. R. Krishna Iyer, held a two-day hearing into the clearances in which about 60,000 people had been evicted. The inquiry covered both legal aspects of the clearances and the human impact.

In March 2002, at the ceremony where the 21st journalism for human rights award was presented by the People's Union for Civil Liberties, S.M. Daud criticized the Supreme Court of India for wrongly convicting writer and activist Arundhati Roy. He said that in a democracy all institutions should be open for criticism including the Supreme Court. Roy had been charged with contempt by the Supreme Court after organizing a demonstration against a court decision that removed obstacles to raising the height of the Sardar Sarovar dam.
