= Indian People's Tribunal =

Organization

- Formation: 5 June 1993; 33 years ago
- Type: NGO
- Location: Mumbai, New Delhi
- Region served: India
- Parent organisation: Human Rights Law Network
- Website: www.iptindia.org

The Indian People's Tribunal (IPT), also called the Indian People's Tribunal on Environmental and Human Rights or Independent People's Tribunal, was a People's Tribunal set up by the NGO the Human Rights Law Network (HRLN) on 5 June 1993. The IPT is an unofficial body led by retired judges who form a panel that conducts public enquiries into human rights and environmental abuses. It provides an alternative outlet for the victims faced with official obstruction and delays. Since being founded the IPT has conducted numerous investigations into cases of relocation of rural people to make way for dams or parks, eviction of slum dwellers, industrial pollution and communal or state-sponsored violence.

== Foundation ==
The parent body of the Indian People's Tribunal is the Human Rights Law Network, a collective of lawyers and social activists who promote human rights in India and neighbouring countries. The objectives of the IPT when it was founded in 1993 were to "encourage victim communities to fight for their rights ... highlight the imperatives of equity and human dignity in the search for true development ... and highlight the environmental and human rights abuses being perpetuated on communities and individuals by the ruling elite in pursuit of unsustainable 'development' objectives". The IPT was to be a permanent body that would fight the inertia and bureaucracy of the government and the legal system through public-interest litigation and public awareness campaigns.

== Activities ==
The IPT acts as a "people's court", an alternative to the formal justice system, conducting investigations on many types of issue and recommending remedial actions. It gives a voice to the people affected. Retired judges head the IPT. They are given direction by a council of experts. Grassroots organisations throughout India provide support. In a typical enquiry a team will visit the site and meet with affected people, then conduct a public hearing where all involved parties are asked to give information. Later, the IPT issues a formal report with findings and recommendations.

== Sample investigations and reports ==
=== Rural evictions and relocations ===
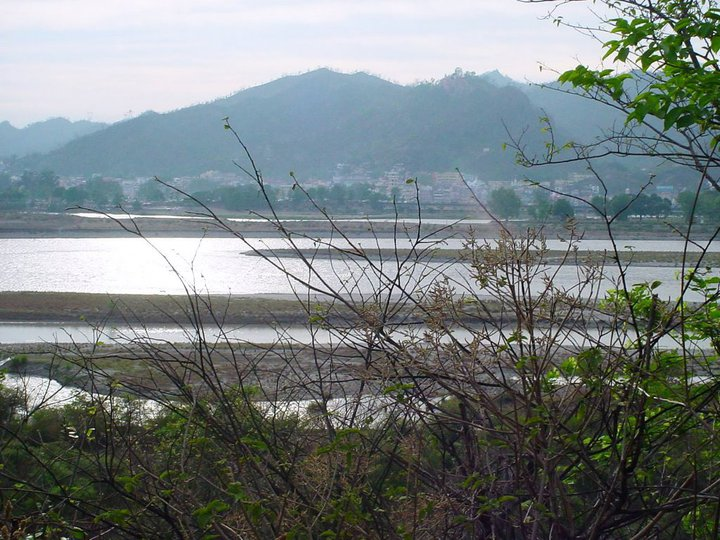
Haridwar seen from Chilla Range, Rajaji National Park. The city has growing firewood demand.

In 1994 the IPT investigated the Rajaji National Park, where the authorities wanted to remove the Gujjars who had traditionally lived in the forest. The tribunal met forest officials, scientists, NGO staff and the Gujjars. A former supreme court justice, P.S. Poti, prepared the IPT report, which recommended that the Gujjars be allowed to stay but assisted if they decided to leave. This would require a change to the laws, which specified that no humans could live in a national park. Justice Poti interviewed the many stakeholders, showed the complexity of the issues, and showed that moving the residents out of the forest would not guarantee its survival.

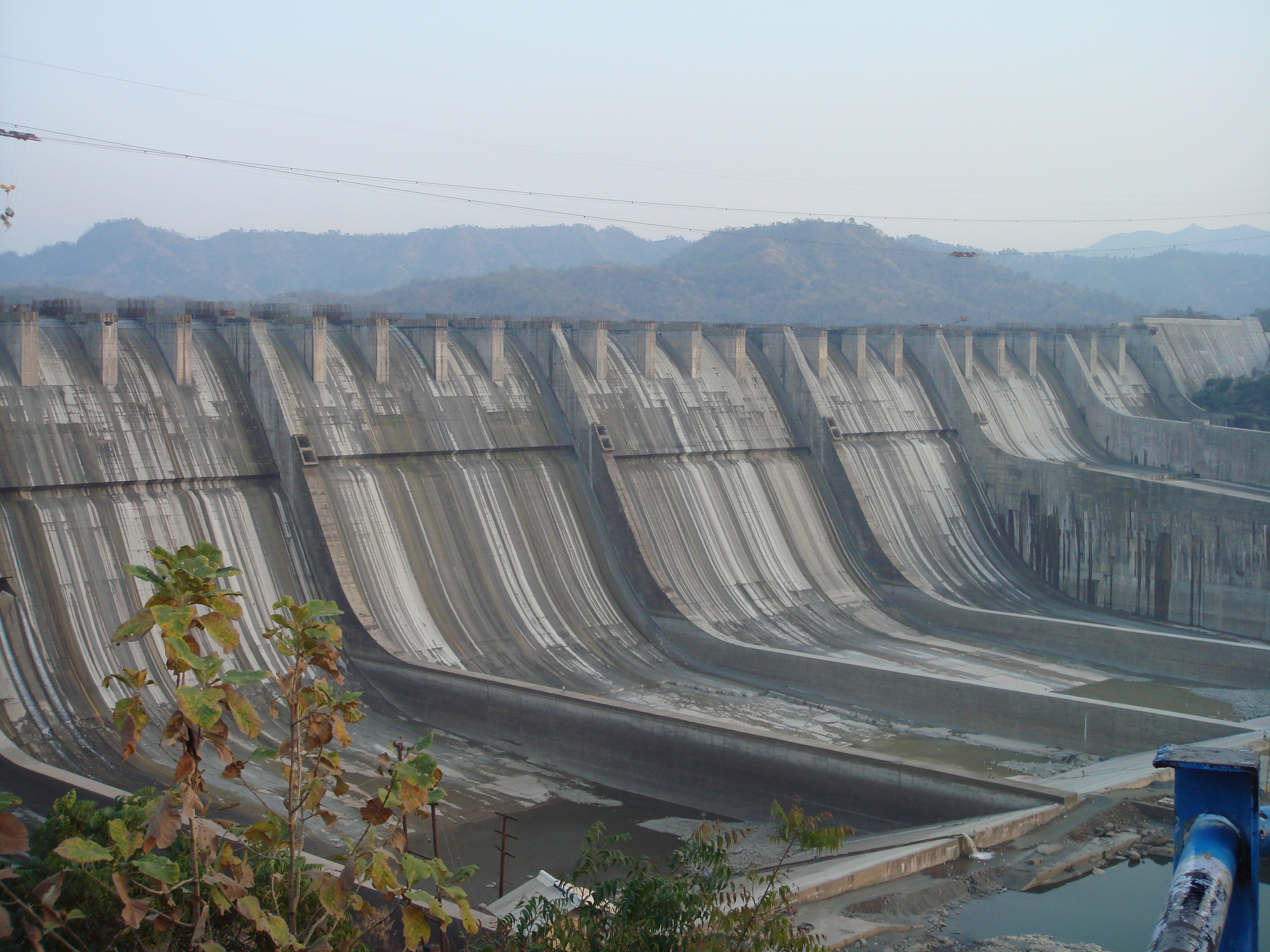
The Sardar Sarovar Dam undergoing height increase in 2006

The Sardar Sarovar Dam project on the Narmada River in Gujarat was highly controversial, involving displacement of many people. In 1994 S.M. Daud, a retired justice of the high court of Mumbai, visited the area and wrote a report for the IPT. He described the "indiscriminate arrests, beatings, confinements and prohibitory orders" to which local opponents of the project were being subjected. He said that unless these abuses ceased "the victims may be tempted to take to arms and add to the troubles faced by an already beleaguered nation."

In March 1999 the IPT investigated the condition of tribal people who had accepted an offer by the government to relocate eight years ago when a dam had submerged their land in the Narmada River Valley. The people had been promised equal amounts of land at the new site, payment to cover the cost of the move, building materials and infrastructure such as water supplies, schools and so on. The hearing found that none of these promises had been fulfilled. In April 2004 the IPT issued a report in which it recommended to the national and state governments that they cancel the Kudremukh national park project due to the impact on tribal people resident in the region.

In June 2010 the IPT released a report documenting results of an investigation of large-scale dam projects like Sardar Sarovar, Indira Sagar, Omkareshwar and Jobat. The public hearings were headed by Ajit Prakash Shah, former Chief Justice of Delhi. The report described forced displacement of the local people without land-based rehabilitation. It documented "serious non-compliance on the pari-passu implementation of rehabilitation and environmental measures" and other violations of the law.

=== Slum evictions ===
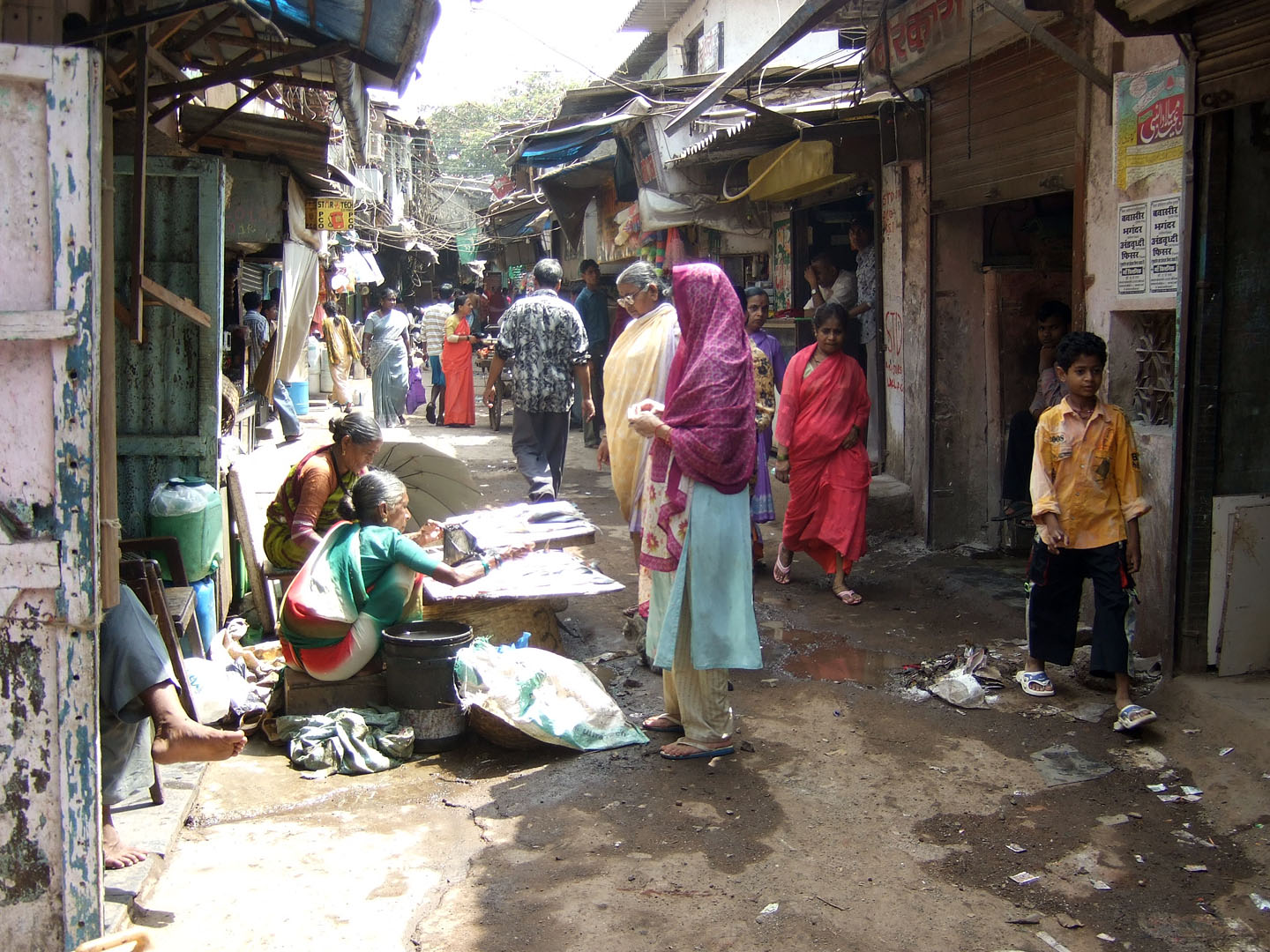
Dharavi Slum in Mumbai

The IPT has asserted that all citizens have the right to have a place to live, and on this basis has campaigned against slum clearances. In August 1995 Justice Hosbet Suresh, a retired judge of the Bombay high court, issued a report titled Forced Evictions – An Indian People's Tribunal Enquiry into the Brutal Demolitions of Pavement and Slum Dwellers' Homes. Early in 1999 the Indore authorities began a vigorous slum clearance drive, removing slum dwellers from legal pattas they had been given by the state government. Judge K. Sukumaran of the IPT visited the rehabilitation sites and prepared a report on his findings.

A 2005 report titled Bulldozing Right documented the fact that many of the Mumbai abuses documented in 1995 continued ten years later. Between November 2004 and February 2005 over 300,000 people were evicted from "illegal land" and their dwellings destroyed. In the past these people had received electricity and other services from government agencies, and had repeatedly paid off the police. The 2005 IPT report said of the impact on children that many suffered "post-demolition trauma" and could drop out of the school system altogether.

=== Industry and pollution ===
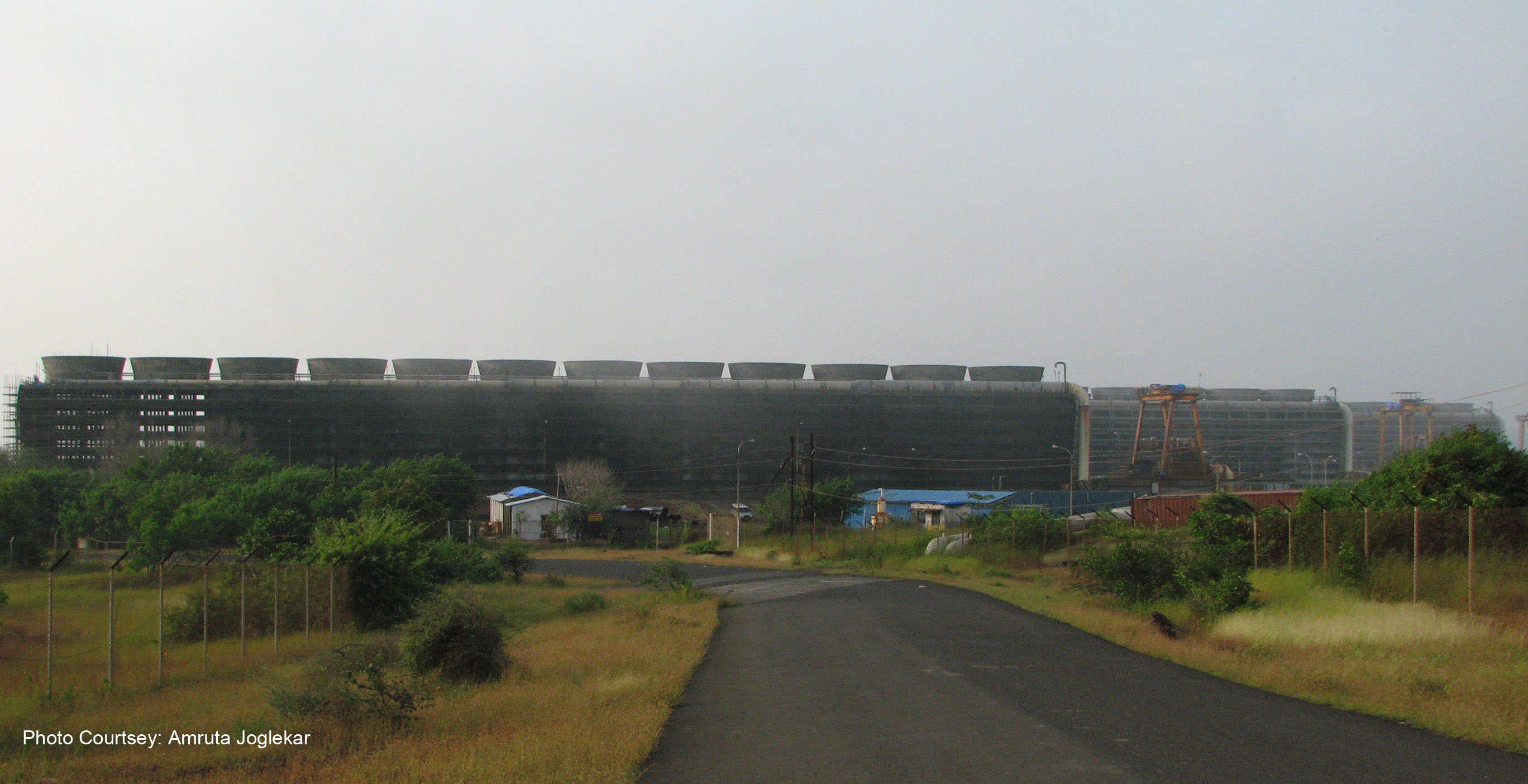
Cooling towers of RGPPL power plant near Dabhol

In April 1998 the IPT issued a report on Enron in India, documenting police action and criminal proceedings against opponents of the Dabhol Power Station. In 1999 the IPT issued a report titled Who Bears the Cost? Industrial and Toxic Pollution in the Golden Corridor of Gujarat. The "golden corridor" is the 400 kilometres (250 mi) industrial corridor along the western coast of Gujarat. Among other findings, a 2001 enquiry into the Bandra Worli Sea Link Project noted that motorways and flyovers benefit the 9% of families who owned cars. Others suffer from increasing pollution.

The SIPCOT chemical industry estate in Cuddalore, Tamil Nadu, was investigated in November 2002 by an IPT team headed by J. Kanakaraj, a retired Madras high court justice. The team reported "a noticeable stench of chemicals in the air". Their report was published in July 2003. It found that "Villages like Kudikadu, Thaikal, Eachangadu and Sonnanchavadi lie in a virtual 'gas chamber' surrounded on three sides by chemical factories and bounded on the fourth by the river". In a 2008 report the retired secretary for water resources in the national government claimed "reason to believe that in 2000–01 the World Bank worked actively to sabotage the Report of the World Commission on Dams".

The IPT held a three-day session in September 2011 on a proposed nuclear power plant and mines in Jaitapur. The local administration resisted the hearings, refusing to allow the IPT to enter the affected villages and arresting local leaders. However, the high court gave permission for the hearings to proceed. At the hearing local people talked about the issues they were facing, and people came from other states to talk about how they had been affected by similar projects. The tribunal found that the Environmental Impact Assessment (EIA) report was inadequate and recommended preparation of a fresh and complete EIA. Work should be stopped while this was being done.

=== Violence ===
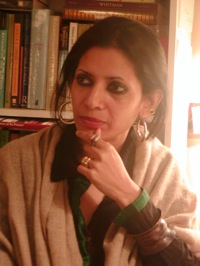
Angana Chatterji received threats for her work on the tribunal

In June 2005 the IPT set up a tribunal in Orissa on the communal situation led by K.K. Usha, a former Chief Justice of the high court of Kerala and the first woman to serve in this role. It was convened by Angana P. Chatterji, an academic based in San Francisco, and Mihir Desai, an advocate of the high court of Mumbai. Activists from the Sangh Parivar disrupted the hearing in Bhubaneswar. In a letter to the National Human Rights Commission of India, Chatterji said threats were faxed from the state office of the Vishva Hindu Parishad. The fax said the tribunal was a group of "leftists, fellow travellers and Hindu baiters". It went on "The inclusion of an NRI (Note: NRI: Non-Resident Indian, referring to the fact that Chatterji is based in the United States) well-known for anti-Hindu activities in the US suggests foreign funds from sources bent on destabilising the country". Chatterji alleged that Hindu nationalist activists threatened to rape tribunal members and to parade them naked in the streets. K.K. Usha and fellow tribunal member R.A. Mehta, a former Acting Chief Justice of the High Court of Gujarat, called the incident "shocking, outrageous and highly deplorable".

The tribunal conducted its investigation for almost twenty months and released its report in October 2006. It describes massive mobilisation of the Sangh Parivar, a Hindutva group, against Muslims and Christians, often justifying their actions on the basis of fabricated threats from the minorities. The Rashtriya Swayamsevak Sangh had been promoting Hindu supremacy using force and coercion. According to Dr. Chatterji, "Forcible conversions to dominant Hinduism, social and economic boycotts, tonsuring, physical intimidation and violence, arson, and even murder are the weapons that Sangh Parivar cadre wields to intimidate and target disenfranchised groups and religious minorities such as Adivasis, Dalits, Christians, and Muslims". The report recommended that the national and state governments treat communalism in Orissa as an emergency requiring immediate attention. Later Subash Chouhan, a Bajrang Dal leader, said his group and the Vishva Hindu Parishad would stop Chatterji from conducting further research.

The HRLN and ANHAD conducted a Tribunal in Srinagar on 20–21 February 2010 that investigated human rights violations in the Kashmir Valley. Justice H. Suresh, a former Judge of the Bombay High Court, headed the jury. A comprehensive report of the findings was released in New Delhi on 8 September 2010. The report documented excessive militarisation, with one soldier for every twenty people. It found that the soldiers receive no punishment for acts of violence they commit against innocent people. The report said "in Kashmir, arbitrary arrests, detention, torture and custodial deaths, rape and midnight raids into homes and disappearances have become routine". The report recommended withdrawal of the draconian laws, a drastic reduction in the number of troops and institution of legal processes by which justice could be done.

== Members ==
Some notable people who have served on the tribunals:

- Angana P. Chatterji (born November 1966), anthropologist and left-wing activist
- Siraj Mehfuz Daud (1 January 1931 – 10 May 2010), former judge in the high court of Bombay
- Mihir Desai, advocate in the high court of Bombay and the Supreme Court of India
- Colin Gonsalves, senior advocate of the Supreme Court of India
- V. R. Krishna Iyer (born 1 November 1915), former judge in the Supreme Court of India
- J. Kanakaraj (born 1936), former judge of the high court of Madras
- R. A. Mehta (born 1936), former judge of the high court of Gujarat
- Sudhir Pattnaik, editor of the Oriya magazine Samadrushi, a political fortnightly
- Padmanabhan Subramanian Poti (2 February 1923 – February 1998), former Chief Justice of the high courts of Kerala and Gujarat
- Ram Puniyani (born 25 August 1945), professor in biomedical engineering
- Rajinder Sachar (born 22 December 1923), former chief justice of high court of Delhi
- P. B. Sawant (born 30 June 1930), former judge of the Supreme Court of India
- K. Sukumaran, former judge in the high courts of Kerala and Bombay
- Hosbet Suresh (born 20 July 1929), former judge of the high court of Bombay
- K. K. Usha (born 3 July 1939), former chief justice of the high court of Kerala
