= V. R. Kota =

Coordinates: 15.1055°N 79.79392°E

- Village
- Interactive map of V. R. Kota
- Country: India
- State: Andhra Pradesh
- District: Nellore
- Mandal: Lingasamudram

Population (2011)
  - Total: 2,715

Languages
  - Official: Telugu
- Time zone: UTC+5:30 (IST)
- PIN: 523113
- Telephone code: 08599
- Vehicle registration: AP 27

Veera Raaghavuni Kota, commonly shortened to V. R. Kota, is one of the major villages in Lingasamudram Mandal in Nellore District in the Coastal Andhra Region of Andhra Pradesh, India.

== Location ==
The village is in a river valley and has an anicut for irrigation. It is served by Ongole railway station, a major station on the Chennai-Howrah Railway Route.

The village is major Grama Panchayat in Lingasamudram Mandal. Nearest Town is Kandukur, which is about 22 kms from the village. Nearest railway station is Singarayakonda, which is about 36 km from the village. Nearest Airports are Vijayawada and Tirupathi, which are nearly the same distance about 230 km from the village.

== Agriculture ==
Buffalo and cattle are kept in the village. tobacco, bengal gram and black gram.

== Culture ==
The 500-year-old Sivalayam is a famous temple near a river tributary.

In the month of October 2021, the villagers celebrated the function of "Grama Garbha Puna Sthapitham", more commonly known as "Grama Boddu Raayi Pooja".

== Amenities ==
The village has schools including a high school. It also has banking facilities and a health centre.
