= K. K. Usha =

Indian judge (1939–2020)

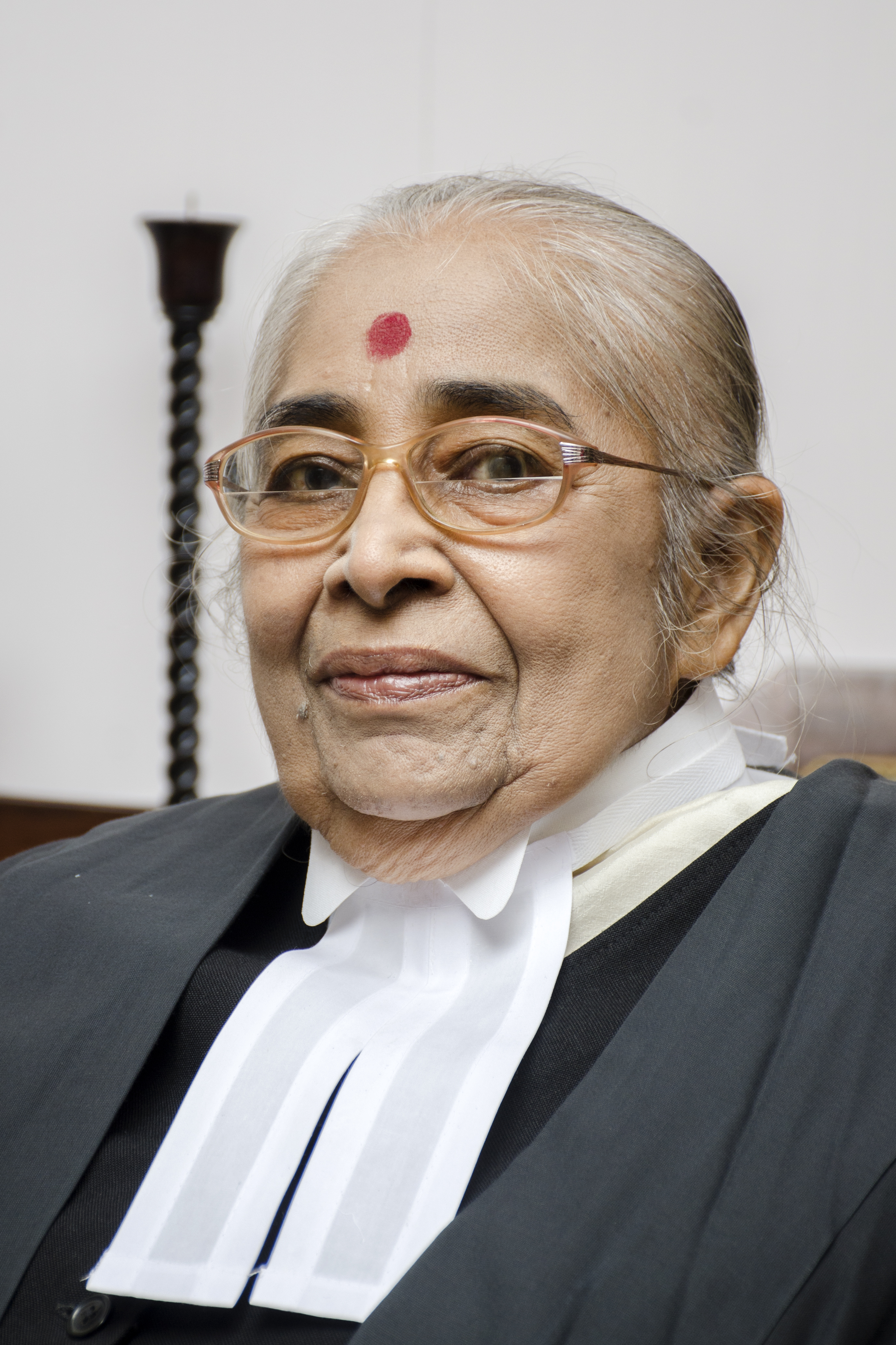
- Usha in May 2020

Chief Justice of Kerala High Court
- In office 2000–2001
- Appointed by: K. R. Narayanan
- Preceded by: Arvind Vinayakarao Savant
- Succeeded by: B. N. Srikrishna

Judge of Kerala High Court
- In office 1991–2000

Personal details
- Born: 3 July 1939 Thrissur, Kerala, India
- Died: 5 October 2020 (aged 81)
- Spouse: K. Sukumaran
- Children: 2
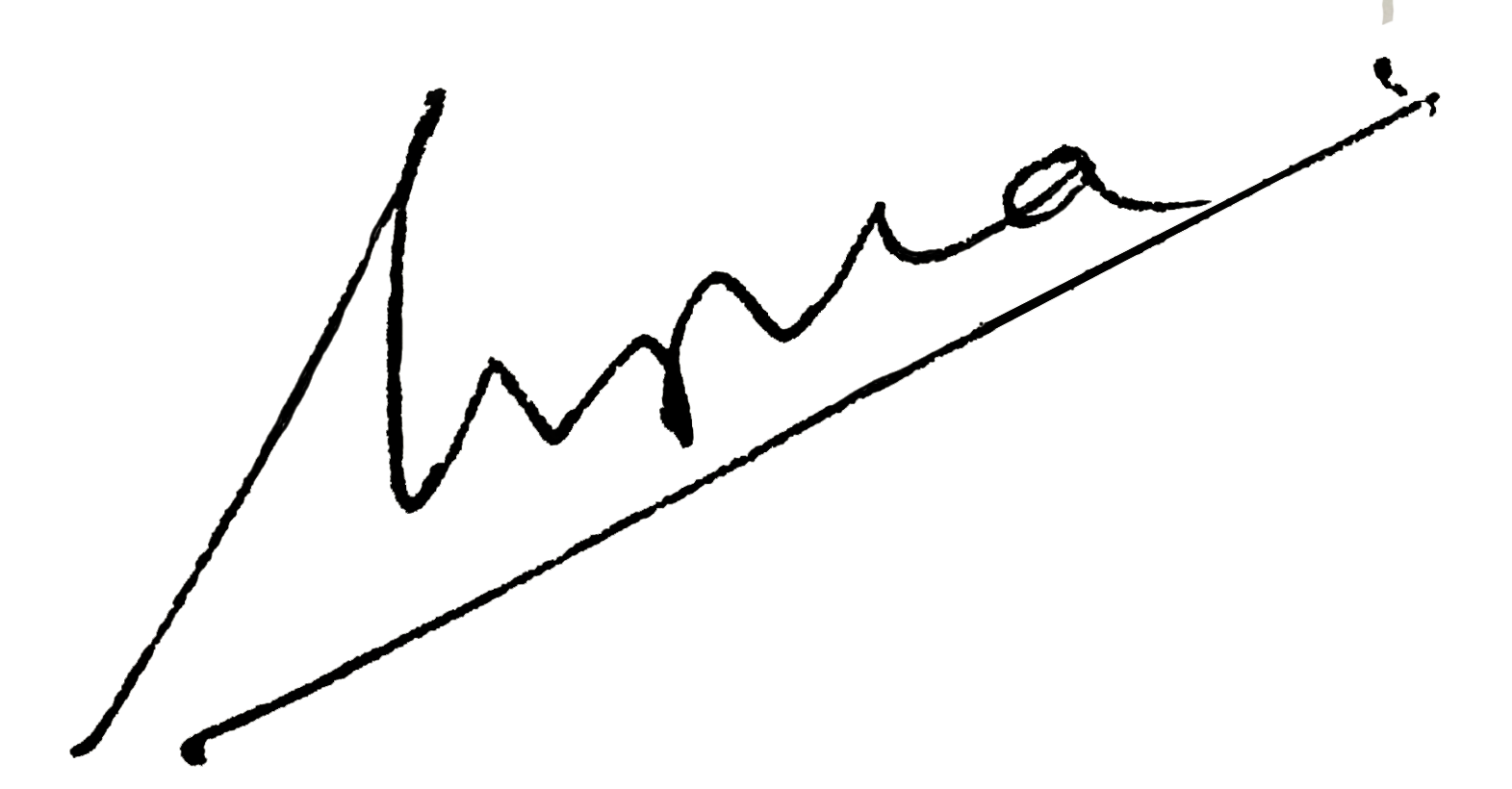
- Signature

K. K. Usha (3 July 1939 – 5 October 2020) was an Indian judge who served as Chief Justice of the Kerala High Court. She was the first female judge on the High Court. She advocated for women's rights and the elimination of all forms of discrimination. Usha served as president of the Excise and Service Tax Appellate Tribunal.

== Early life and legal career ==
K. K. Usha was born on 3 July 1939. She enrolled as an advocate in 1961. She was appointed Government pleader in the Kerala High Court in 1979. She was a judge and then Chief Justice in the High Court from 25 February 1991 to 3 July 2001. She was the Chief Justice from 2000 to 2001. She was the first woman to join the Kerala High Court from the bar and become a Chief Justice. After retiring from the High Court, from 2001 to 2004 she was President of the Delhi-based Customs, Excise and Service Tax Appellate Tribunal.

== Other activities ==
In 1975, Usha represented India at the International Convention of the International Federation of Women Lawyers in Hamburg, Germany. She also represented India at the United Nations' Joint Seminar on "Convention on the elimination of all forms of discrimination as regards women", which had been organised by the International Federation of Women Lawyers and the International Federation of Women of Legal Careers. She was a member and the President of the University Women's Association. She was involved in "Sree Narayana Sevika Samajam", an orphanage and home for destitute women in Trivandrum, the capital city of Kerala.

Between January 2005 and October 2006, Usha headed an enquiry by the Indian People's Tribunal (IPT) to investigate the communal situation in Orissa. Activists from the Sangh Parivar disrupted the final hearing in Bhubaneswar. Angana P. Chatterji, a member of the tribunal, alleged that Hindu nationalist activists threatened to rape tribunal members and to parade them naked in the streets. Usha and fellow tribunal member R.A. Mehta, a former Acting Chief Justice of the High Court of Gujarat, called the incident "shocking, outrageous and highly deplorable".

In December 2011, Usha was a member of an IPT panel on human rights issues in Manipur. The panel, sitting in Imphal, heard testimony about more than forty cases of extrajudicial killings and other human rights violations over a five-year period. It recommended repeal of the Armed Forces (Special Powers) Act in the state.

== Personal life ==
Usha was married to lawyer and judge K. Sukumaran and they were the first judge couple in the country. They had two daughters.

== Death ==
At the age of 81, Justice Usha went into cardiac arrest and died on 5 October 2020, following spinal cord surgery the previous week.
