= Pavani Parameswara Rao =

Indian lawyer

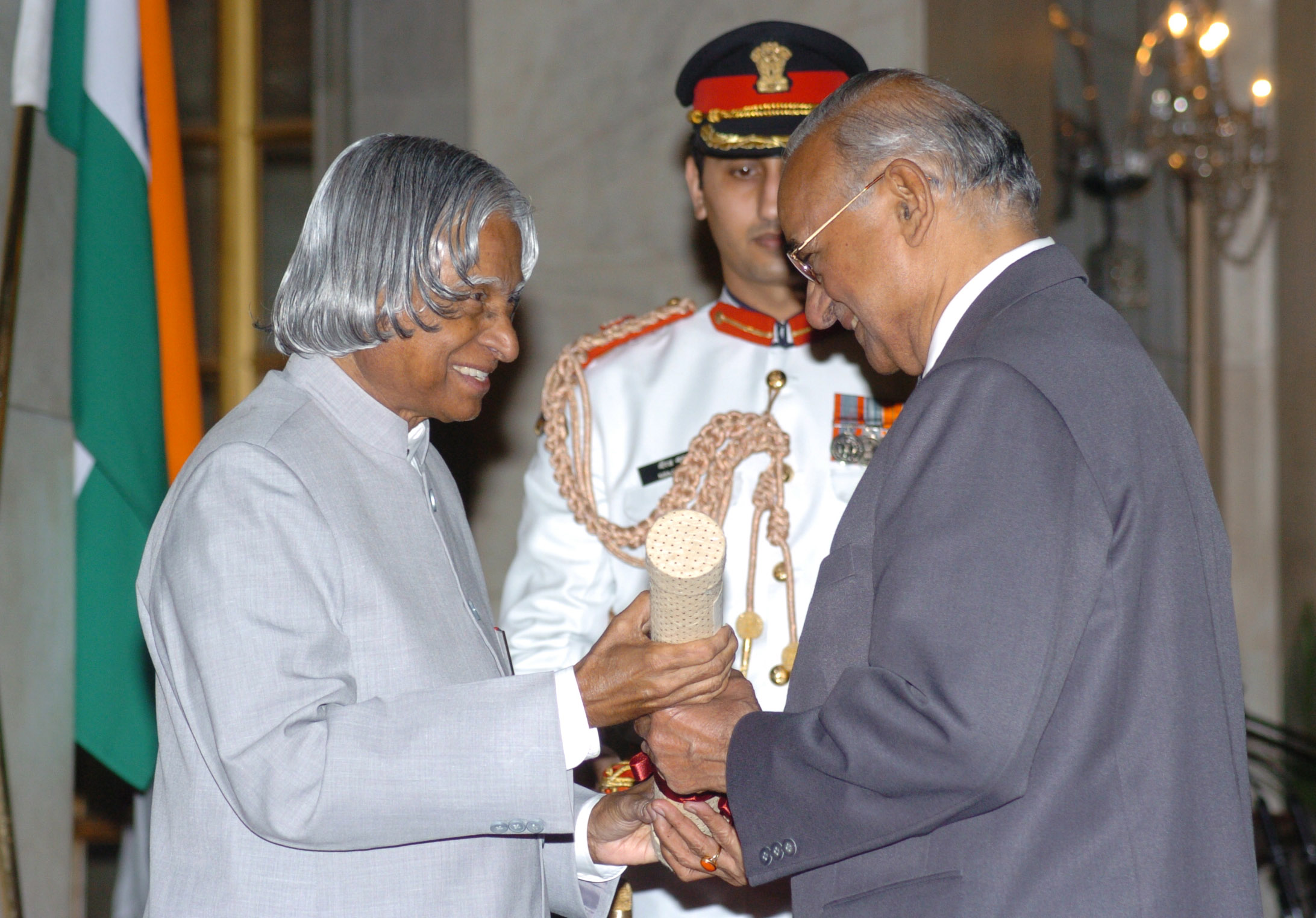
- The President, Dr. A.P.J. Abdul Kalam presenting Padma Bhushan to Pavani Parameswara Rao, on 29 March 2006
- Born: 5 August 1933; Mogalicherla Village, Lingasamudram Mandal, Prakasam District, Andhra Pradesh, India
- Died: 13 September 2017 (aged 84); South Delhi, India
- Education: V.R. College, Nellore, Andhra University (B.A.) Osmania University, Hyderabad (LL.B., LL.M.)
- Occupation: Senior Advocate
- Known for: Constitutional Law
- Awards: Padma Bhushan (2006); Award of Great Legal Luminary of India (1997); Kandukuri Veeresalingam Investigative Journalism Award (2000); National Law Day Award (2005); Andhra Kesri Award (2006); Nyaaya Visarada by Sree Rayala Kala Samithi, Chennai; First Justice V.R. Krishna Iyer Award (2006); Ugadi Puraskar (2007); Human Excellence Award (2008)

Pavani Parameswara Rao (P. P. Rao; 5 August 1933 – 13 September 2017) was a Senior Advocate practising in the Supreme Court of India. Widely considered a doyen of Constitutional Law, he had argued a number of landmark cases before the Supreme Court. He died on 13 September 2017 in a private hospital in South Delhi following a cardiac arrest, India.

== Early life ==
He was born on 5 August 1933, in Mogalicherla Village, Lingasamudram Mandal in the Prakasam District of Andhra Pradesh. He completed his B.A. from V.R. College, Nellore, Andhra University and his LL.B. and LL.M. from Osmania University, Hyderabad. Mr. Rao started his career teaching law in the University of Delhi in 1961. He was enrolled as an Advocate by the Bar Council of Delhi in 1967 and thereafter started practice in the Supreme Court. He was the chamber junior to Shri N.C. Chatterjee, Senior Advocate and Parliamentarian. Thereafter when Mr. NC Chatterjee left for Kolkata, due his ailing health in 1967, he joined the chambers of his former teacher, Shri Raja Vasudev Pillai, Senior Advocate. During this time he assisted leading lawyers of the time like H.M. Seervai, M.C. Setalvad, C.K. Daphtary, N.C. Chatterjee, S.V. Gupte, A.K. Sen, Niren De, etc. In February 1969, he became an Advocate-on-Record. He was Advocate-on-Record for the State of Andhra Pradesh and a Junior Standing Counsel for the Central Government before he was designated as Senior Advocate by the Supreme Court in August 1976. He was elected the President of the Supreme Court Bar Association in 1991, and in 2006, he was awarded the Padma Bhushan. On 4 March 2010, he was awarded an LL.D. (Honoris Causa) in recognition of his eminence and contributions to the cause of public interest.

== Contribution to the development of law in India ==
Soon after demolition of the Babri Masjid in December 1992, President's Rule was imposed in the four Bharatiya Janata Party (BJP)-ruled states, viz., Uttar Pradesh, Madhya Pradesh, Rajasthan and Himachal Pradesh. When these proclamations were challenged in the Supreme Court by lawyers such as Soli Sorabjee, Ram Jethmalani, Shanti Bhushan and others who generally represented the opposition parties, Rao defended the Proclamations representing the States of Madhya Pradesh and Himachal Pradesh which were then under President's Rule. Rao conceived, developed and presented the argument based on secularism which is part of the basic structure of the Constitution and convinced the Court that all the four BJP Governments had acted in concert and violated the basic feature of secularism by mobilising, encouraging and supporting the Kar Sevaks who demolished Babri Masjid. The Supreme Court upheld all the four Proclamations. The judgement is reported as SR Bommai v Union of India, (1994) 3 SCC 1 = AIR 1994 SC 1918.

Rao appeared in several other leading cases involving interpretation of the Constitution. He successfully fought against capitation fees in educational institutions in J.P. Unnikrishnan's case (1993); for the privileges of members of parliament in P.V. Narasimha Rao's case (1998); for the Governor's power to appoint a Chief Minister who is not a member of the Legislature, but enjoying majority support while her appeal against conviction was pending in B.R. Kapoor's case (2001); for the voters' right to information about the antecedents of contesting candidates in the PUCL case appearing for Lok Satta (2003); for Government's power of regulation of admissions to professional courses for preventing exploitation of students by private institutions in T.M.A. Pai (2002), Islamic Academy (2003) and P.A. Inamdar (2005). Representing the National Human Rights Commission, he persuaded the Supreme Court to intervene directly in the Best Bakery case in which Fast Track Court had acquitted all the accused. He successfully defended the constitutional validity of Entry Tax before a nine Judge Bench of the Supreme Court in 2016. He had led the arguments on behalf of States of MP and Andhra Pradesh. President Pranab Mukherjee has given his nod for the nomination of P.P. Rao, senior advocate, as jurist member of the selection committee of the Lokpal, the anti-corruption ombudsman.

== Seminars and conferences ==
Rao participated in several seminars and conferences including the SAARC Law conferences, International Bar Association, Law Asia and Conferences of Commonwealth Law Association. He led the Indian delegation of lawyers to the Soviet Union (1983) and was a member of the official delegation of lawyers to China led by the Attorney-General (1990).

Rao along with other like-minded lawyers and citizens organised a National Convention for Communal Harmony and Constitutional Objectives in Delhi in April–May 1993, after the demolition of Babri Masjid, securing the participation of many renowned persons from different fields, including retired Judges of the Supreme Court and High Courts, Members of Parliament past and present, former Ministers, administrators including former Cabinet Secretaries, Governors, academicians, journalists and others.

Rao was also associated with several organisations/associations mostly connected with law, teaching and legal research. He is a Member of the Governing bodies of National Law Schools, Indian Law Institute, National Judicial Academy etc.

== Written works ==
Rao co-authored Emergency and the Law (1966) with his Senior, N.C. Chatterjee, M.P.. He contributed a chapter titled "Union Judiciary" in Constitutional Law of India, edited by M. Hidayatullah (1984).

Rao also wrote a chapter on "The Political Executive" in Political Reforms, published under the auspices of Centre For Policy Studies (2001) and contributed many articles to legal periodicals and newspapers on constitutional law and human rights, including an article for the golden jubilee of the Supreme Court published in Supreme But Not Infallible : Essays in Honour of the Supreme Court of India (2000).

Articles authored by him were often published by The Tribune and the Indian Express.

== Awards ==
- Award of Great Legal Luminary of India (1997) given by All India Conference of Intellectuals (Delhi State).
- Kandukuri Veeresalingam Investigative Journalism Award (2000) given by Hithakarini Samaj, Dr. Vasi Reddy Malathi Trust, Rajahmundry, A.P.
- National Law Day Award (2005) for his lifelong contribution in the field of constitutional law given by Indian Council of Jurists.
- Padma Bhushan announced on 26 January 2006 and awarded on 29 March 2006.
- Andhra Kesri Award (2006) by Andhra Kesri Seva Parivar, Andhra Pradesh.
- 'Nyaaya Visarada' by Sree Rayala Kala Samithi, Chennai
- First Justice V.R. Krishna Iyer Award instituted by the Capital Foundation Society awarded on 15 November 2006.
- Ugadi Puraskar (2007) awarded by Delhi Telugu Academy on 25 March 2007
- Human Excellence Award (2008) instituted by Institution of Engineers (India) and AVR Foundation, Hyderabad.
