= J. Nisha Banu =

Indian judge (1966-)

The Honourable Justice J. Nisha Banu

Judge of the Kerala High Court
- Incumbent
- Assumed office 19 December 2025
- Nominated by: Justice D. Y. Chandrachud
- Appointed by: Droupadi Murmu

Judge of the Madras High Court
- In office 05 October 2016 – 18 December 2025
- Nominated by: Justice T. S. Thakur
- Appointed by: Pranab Mukherjee

Personal details
- Born: 18 September 1966 (age 60) Nagercoil, Tamil Nadu
- Parents: M. Jeniston Devi Raj (father); J. Jeevarthinam (mother)
- Website: High Court of Kerala

J. Nisha Banu is an Indian judge who is presently serving as a judge of Kerala High Court. The High Court of Kerala is the highest court in the Indian state of Kerala and in the Union Territory of Lakshadweep. The High Court of Kerala is headquartered at Ernakulam, Kochi.

== Early life and education ==
Nisha Banu completed her schooling from St. Joseph's Convent Higher Secondary School and obtained graduation in law from Madurai Law College.

== Career ==
Nisha Banu enrolled as an advocate in 1990 and started practicing at Madras High Court. Practiced in Constitutional, Civil, Criminal, Debts Recovery Tribunal, Rent Control and Service Law. Banu shifted her practice to Madurai Bench of the Madras High Court upon its constitution in 2004. While practicing she served as president of the Women Advocates Association, Madurai Bench of the Madras High Court, secretary, Tamil Nadu Federation for Women Lawyers, joint secretary of All India Federation of Women Lawyers, standing counsel for the Directorate of Revenue Intelligence, Bar Council of Tamil Nadu and Puducherry and Annamalai University, as mediator from 2005, member of the Sensitisation Committee, panel advocate for the Legal Services Authority of India and member of the Lok Adalat. She was appointed as judge of Madras High Court on 5 October 2016 and thereafter upon transfer joined High Court of Kerala from 19 December 2025.
