= P. B. Sawant =

Indian judge (1930–2021)

P. B. Sawant (30 June 1930 – 15 February 2021) was a judge of the Supreme Court of India.

After obtaining his law degree (LL.B.) from Bombay University, Sawant started practicing as an advocate initially at the Bombay High Court and later at Supreme Court of India. In 1973, he was appointed judge of the Bombay High Court; among his notable acts was an inquiry into the Air-India aircraft crash in June 1982. He was appointed justice in the Supreme Court in 1989.

Since his retirement in 1995, he was active in public affairs.

In 2002, he served with retired justice Hosbet Suresh on an Indian People's Tribunal headed by justice V. R. Krishna Iyer to investigate the 2002 Gujarat riots. Their report includes testimony of the then Gujarat Bharatiya Janata Party (BJP) minister Haren Pandya (since murdered), who testified about a meeting convened by Narendra Modi on the evening of the Godhra train burning. At this meeting, officials were instructed not to obstruct the Hindu rage following the incident. The report also highlighted a second meeting, held in Lunawada village of Panchmahal district, attended by state ministers Ashok Bhatt, Prabhatsinh Chauhan, and other BJP and RSS leaders, where "detailed plans were made on the use of kerosene and petrol for arson and other methods of killing."

Sawant chaired the P. B. Sawant commission constituted on 1 September 2003 to investigate corruption charges against 4 ministers of the Government of Maharashtra, namely, Nawab Malik, Padmasinh Patil, Suresh Jain and Vijaykumar Gavit. He submitted his report on 23 February 2005, which indicted Nawab Malik, Padmasinh Patil and Suresh Jain but exonerated Vijaykumar Gavit. It resulted in the resignation of two state cabinet ministers, Suresh Jain and Nawab Malik.
