= K. Sukumaran (judge) =

Indian lawyer and judge

Hon'ble Justice K. Sukumaran
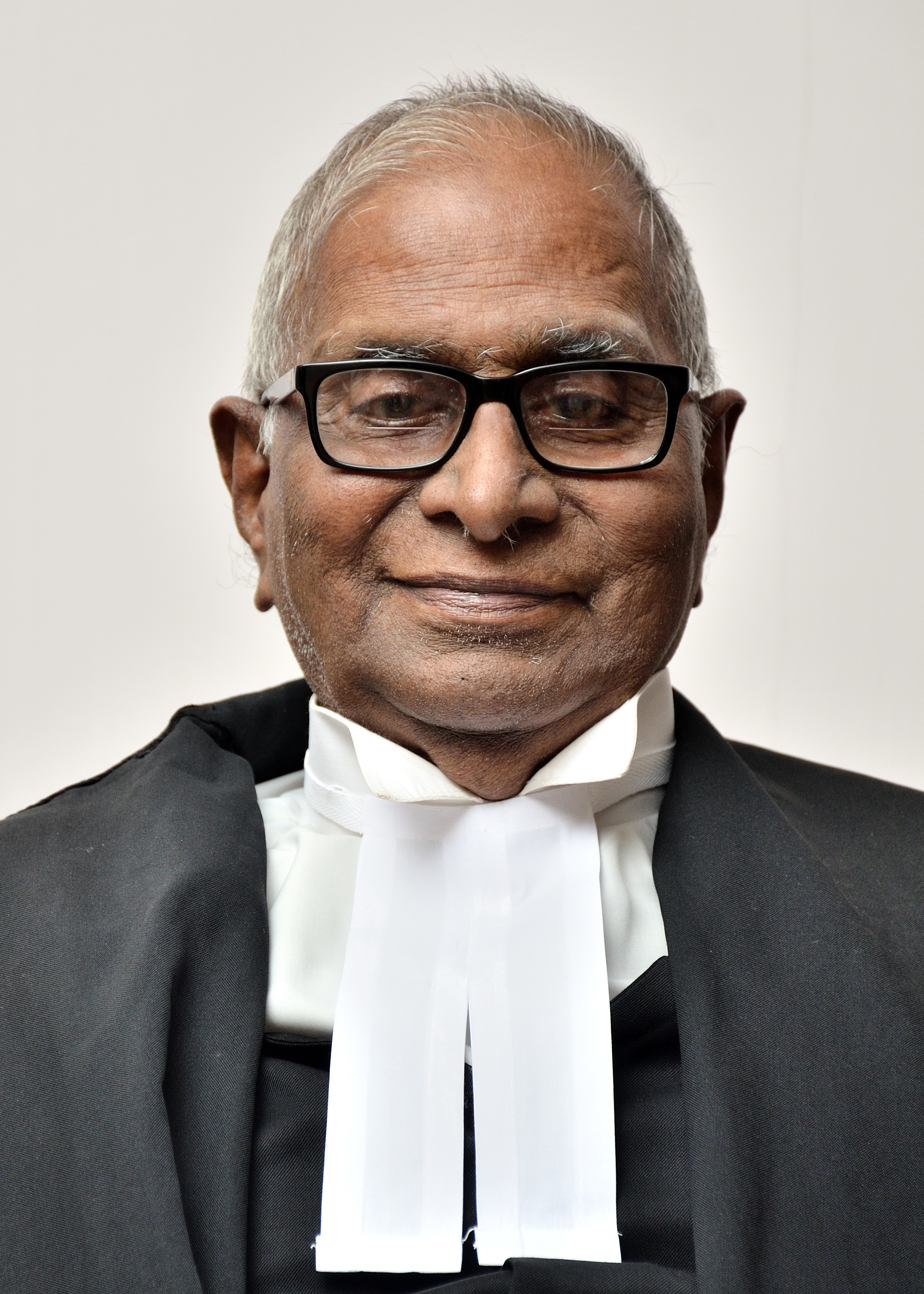
- Sukumaran in 2020

Judge of Bombay High Court
- In office 19 March 1991 – 12 July 1992

Judge of High Court of Kerala
- In office 28 September 1981 – 18 March 1991

Personal details
- Born: c. July 1929 (age 96) Kerala, India
- Spouse: K. K. Usha (died 2020)
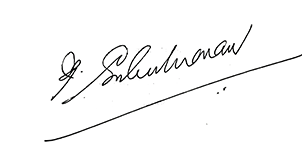
- Signature

K. Sukumaran (born c. July 1929) is an Indian lawyer who served as a judge in the high courts of Kerala and Mumbai in India. He has led several inquiries into human rights abuses. He is the author of several books on legal topics.

== Formal career ==
K. Sukumaran had his high school education from St. Albert's High School, Ernakulam and was a graduate of Maharaja's College in Kerala. He began practice in 1955 as a lawyer at the Kerala High Court. From 1969 to 1976 he was government pleader at the high court. He was the legal counsel for Kerala Agricultural University. In 1981 he was appointed an additional judge and the next year became a permanent judge at the court. He was appointed by the government to inquire into a scandal related to the Idamalayar and Kallada Dams. Based on his report, Minister R. Balakrishna Pillai and others were prosecuted and convicted by a Special Court. He served on the Kerala bench until 18 March 1991. He was then transferred to the Bombay High Court, serving there until his retirement in 1992. While with the Bombay High Court he functioned on the Benches of the high court at Nagpur, Aurangabad, Goa.

== Post-retirement ==
After retirement K. Sukumaran became a senior counsel at the Supreme Court of India. At the request of the Non Resident Keralites Association he was appointed chairman of a committee to suggest amendments to the Emigration Act, 1983, but due to bureaucratic obstacles this did not achieve much. As Chairman of NISA he dealt with the problems of Overseas Indians. He is the Chairman of Legal Reporting Trust, publisher of the Malayalam journal Niyama Sameeksha. The journal discusses legal concepts in language accessible to ordinary people. His fifth book in Malayalam, Niyamavum Jeevithavum (Law and Life) won the Kerala Sahitya Academy Award in 2002.

Early in 1999 the Indore authorities began a vigorous slum clearance drive, removing slum dwellers from legal pattas they had been given by the state government. K. Sukumaran led an inquiry for the Indian People's Tribunal (IPT), visited the rehabilitation sites, and on 2 May 1999 delivered an interim report to the government, which accepted that in principle the demolitions were not legal. He led another IPT inquiry into relief and rehabilitation after the 2001 Gujarat earthquake, publishing a report in December 2001. He also led an IPT inquiry into atrocities that had been committed against Dalits in and around Varanasi in Uttar Pradesh, publishing a report in October 2002.

== Views ==
Speaking in January 2011 at a new forum of lawyers called "Justitia", K. Sukumaran said "When laws are violated and justice denied, every living person should react and respond to the situation". In June 2011 calls were being made for an investigation into the conduct of K. G. Balakrishnan, former Chief Justice of India. In an interview, K. Sukumaran said it was "a fact that judges are approached by vested interests and attempts made to influence them". After acknowledging that some high courts were corrupt, he said "I am pained by the dirt being flung at the judiciary because I have great respect and admiration for its edifice. I have been part of this edifice, part of the judiciary. The integrity and independence of this institution must be safeguarded and this must be a national priority."

== Bibliography ==
K. Sukumaran has written several Malayalam-language books:

- Nyayadhipa Chintakal (Judge's Thoughts)
- Bharana Ghadanayum Anubandha Chintakalum (Constitution and Allied Thoughts)
- Jeevithavaum niyamavum (Life and Law)
- Niyama Sparsangal (Legal Touches)
- Niyamavum Jeevithavum (Law and Life)
