= Sachar Committee =

Former Indian committee

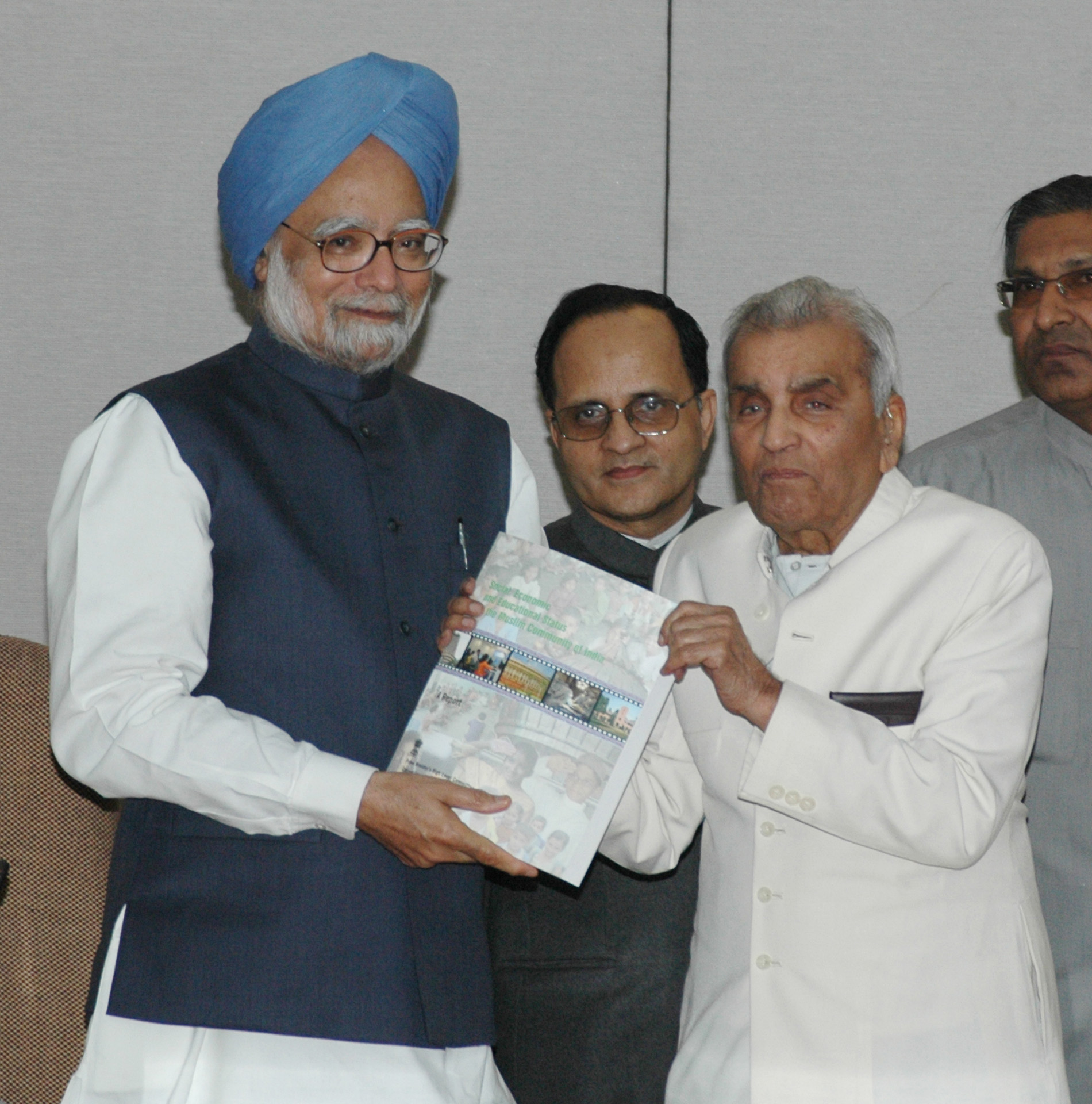
Justice Rajinder Sachar submitting report of the Committee set up to study social, economic and educational status of Muslims to the Prime Minister, Dr. Manmohan Singh, in New Delhi on November 17, 2006.

The Sachar Committee was a seven-member high-level committee established in March 2005 by former Indian Prime Minister Manmohan Singh. The committee was headed by former Chief Justice of Delhi High Court Rajinder Sachar to study the social, economic and educational condition of Muslims in India. The committee submitted its report in 2006 and the report was available in public domain on 30 November 2006. The 403-page report had suggestions and solutions for the inclusive development of the Muslims in India.

== Background ==
In 2004, the Congress Party returned to power in India after having been in opposition for eight years, an unprecedented length of time for a party which had ruled the country for forty-four out of fifty-seven years between 1947 and 2004. It returned to power as head of a coalition, winning 145/543 seats in the Lok Sabha. One of its initiatives was the commissioning of a report on the latest social, economic, and educational conditions of the Muslim community of India.

== Composition ==
The committee was composed of seven members. The committee was headed by Rajinder Sachar, former Chief Justice of the Delhi High Court. The other members of the committee were Sayyid Hamid, M.A. Basith, Akhtar Majeed, Abu Saleh Shariff, T.K. Oommen and Rakesh Basant. The committee did not include any female members.

== Report ==
The committee, which was appointed by the then Prime Minister Manmohan Singh, was headed by former Chief Justice of the Delhi High Court Rajinder Sachar, as well as six other members. The committee prepared a 403-page report, titled "Social, Economic and Educational Status of the Muslim Community of India: A Report", and presented it to the Lok Sabha, the lower house of the Indian Parliament, on 30 November 2006, 20 months after obtaining the terms of reference from the Prime Minister's Office. This report highlighted issues facing the Muslim community and their representation in Indian public life,

The report made observations on the high birthrate in the Muslim community in comparison to Hindus: the committee estimated that the Muslim proportion will stabilize at between 17% and 21% of the Indian population by 2100.

The Sachar Committee highlighted and presented its suggestions on how to remove impediments preventing Indian Muslims from fully participating in the economic, political, and social mainstream of Indian life. The report was the first of its kind to reveal the "backwardness" (a term used in Indian academic and legal discourse for historically dispossessed or economically vulnerable communities, not meant to be pejorative) of Indian Muslims. An issue highlighted was that while Muslims constitute 14% of the Indian population, they only comprise 2.5% of the Indian bureaucracy. The Sachar Committee concluded that the conditions facing Indian Muslims was below that of Scheduled Castes and Scheduled Tribes.

The Sachar Committee Report brought the issue of Muslim Indian inequality to national attention, sparking a discussion that is still ongoing. The committee recommended setting up an Equal Opportunity Commission to provide a legal mechanism to address discrimination complaints, including in matters such as housing. In response to the committee's findings, Finance Minister P. Chidambaram proposed an increase to the National Minorities Development and Finance Corporation's (NMDFC) budget, citing new duties and expanded outreach that the institution would take on to implement the committee's recommendations.

== Implemented recommendations ==
Out of the 76 recommendations listed in the Sachar Committee Report, the Government of India has approved 72 recommendations which includes the approval of the Communal Violence (Preventive, Control and Rehabilitation of Victims) Bill, 2005, increasing the number of and grants for Madrasas and schools in minority concentration areas, some for girls only, increasing the allocation for the minority commission and Waqf Board, reservations and grants for Muslims, loans to Muslims, increasing the number of Muslim teachers, health and police personnel at Govt. cost, housing for Muslims, representation of minorities in local bodies, dissemination of available schemes in Urdu and so on.

== Methodology ==
The Sachar Committee used 2001 census data trty. Banking data was received from different sources such as the Reserve Bank of India, National Bank for Agriculture and Rural Development, Small Industries Development Bank of India, National Minorities Development and Finance Corporation, and the National Backward Classes Finance and Development Corporation. Corroborative data was also obtained from government commissions and organisations such as the National Commission for Backward Classes, the State Backward Classes Commission, and the National Council of Educational Research and Training. Finally, data from other sources, including ministries, departments, public sector undertakings, universities, and colleges were used in preparing this report.

== Criticism ==
In November 2013, Gujarat government contended before the Supreme Court that the Rajinder Sachar Committee was "unconstitutional," and that it only sought to help Muslims. It has strongly criticized the manner in which the PMO set up the Sachar Committee in 2005 to survey the socio-economic conditions of Muslims, while ignoring other religious minorities. This affidavit was filed in response to the centre's stand that the scheme was valid and that the Modi Government was to blame for the deteriorating condition of Muslims in Gujarat.
