= Lingasamudram mandal =

- Mandal
- Interactive map of Lingasamudram mandal
- Location in Andhra Pradesh, India
- Coordinates: 15.0950°N 79.7007°E
- Country: India
- State: Andhra Pradesh
- District: Prakasam
- Headquarters: Lingasamudram

Area
  - Total: 234.81 km^{2} (90.66 sq mi)

Population (2011)
  - Total: 38,094
  - Density: 162.23/km^{2} (420.18/sq mi)

Languages
  - Official: Telugu
- Time zone: UTC+5:30 (IST)

Lingasamudram mandal is a mandal in Prakasam district of the Indian state of Andhra Pradesh. Its headquarters are located at Lingasamudram. The mandal is bounded by .This mandal is located at Kandukur revenue division.

== Demographics ==
As of 2011 census, the mandal had a population of 38,094. The total population constitute, 13,114 males and 18,980 females —a sex ratio of 990 females per 1000 males. 8,365 children are in the age group of 0–6 years, of which 4,276 are boys and 4,089 are girls —a ratio of 956 per 1000. The average literacy rate stands at 76.11% with 51,318 literates.

== Towns and villages ==
As of 2011 census, the mandal has 20 revenue villages. is the most populated and is the least populated villages in the mandal.

The settlements in the mandal are listed below:

1. Anneboinapalle
2. Cheemalapenta
3. Chinapavani
4. Gangapalem
5. Jagamreddi Khandrika
6. Lingasamudram
7. Mala Konda Rayunipalem
8. Mogilicherla
9. Mukteswaram
10. Mutyalapadu
11. Narasimhapuram
12. Pentrala
13. Racheruvurajupalem
14. Rallapadu
15. Thimmareddy Palem
16. Thunugunta
17. Thurpurajupalem
18. Veera Raghavuni Kota
19. Vengalapuram
20. Viswanadhapuram

Note: CT-Census town

== See also ==
- List of mandals in Andhra Pradesh
