= Slums in Chennai =

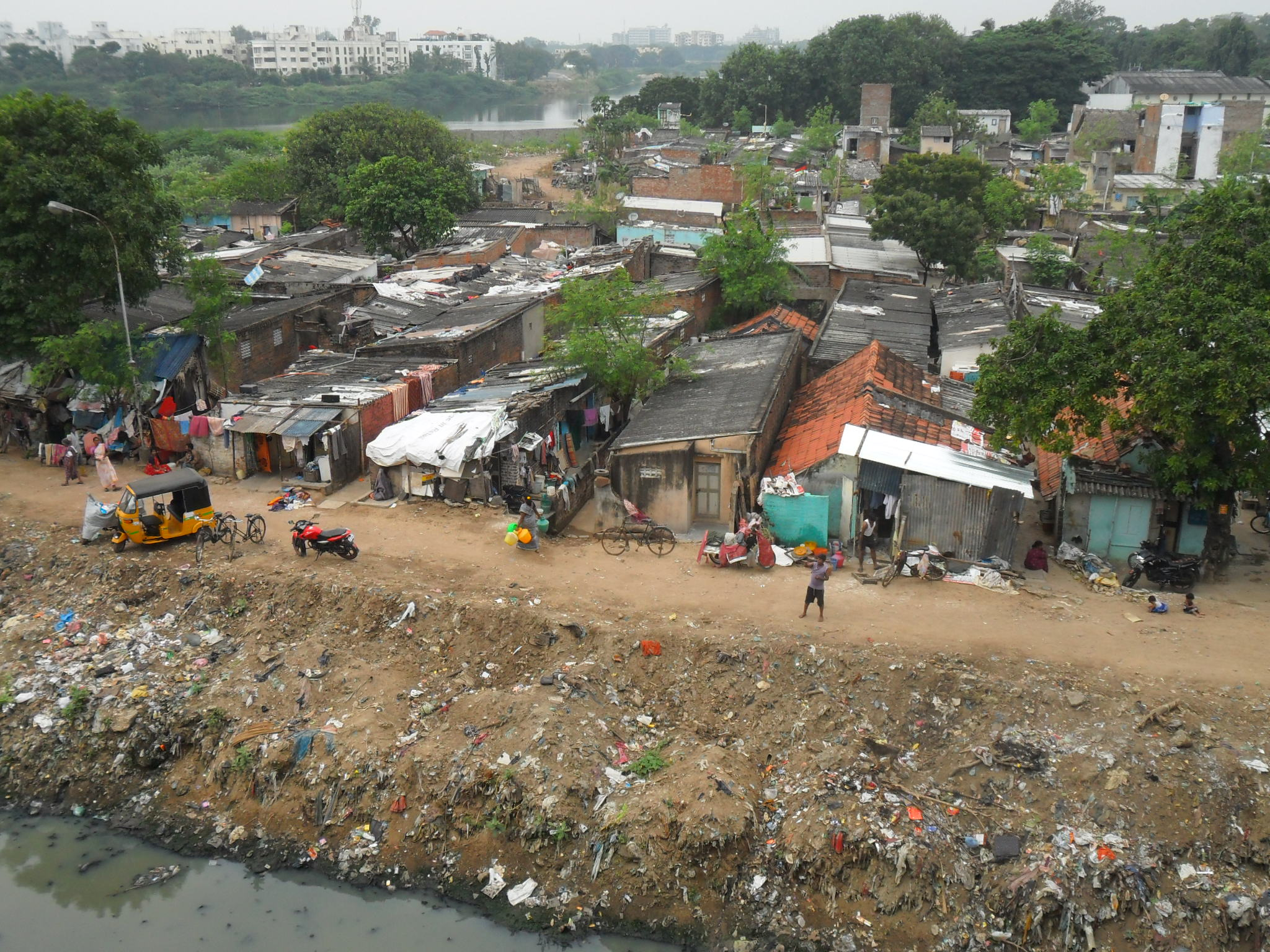

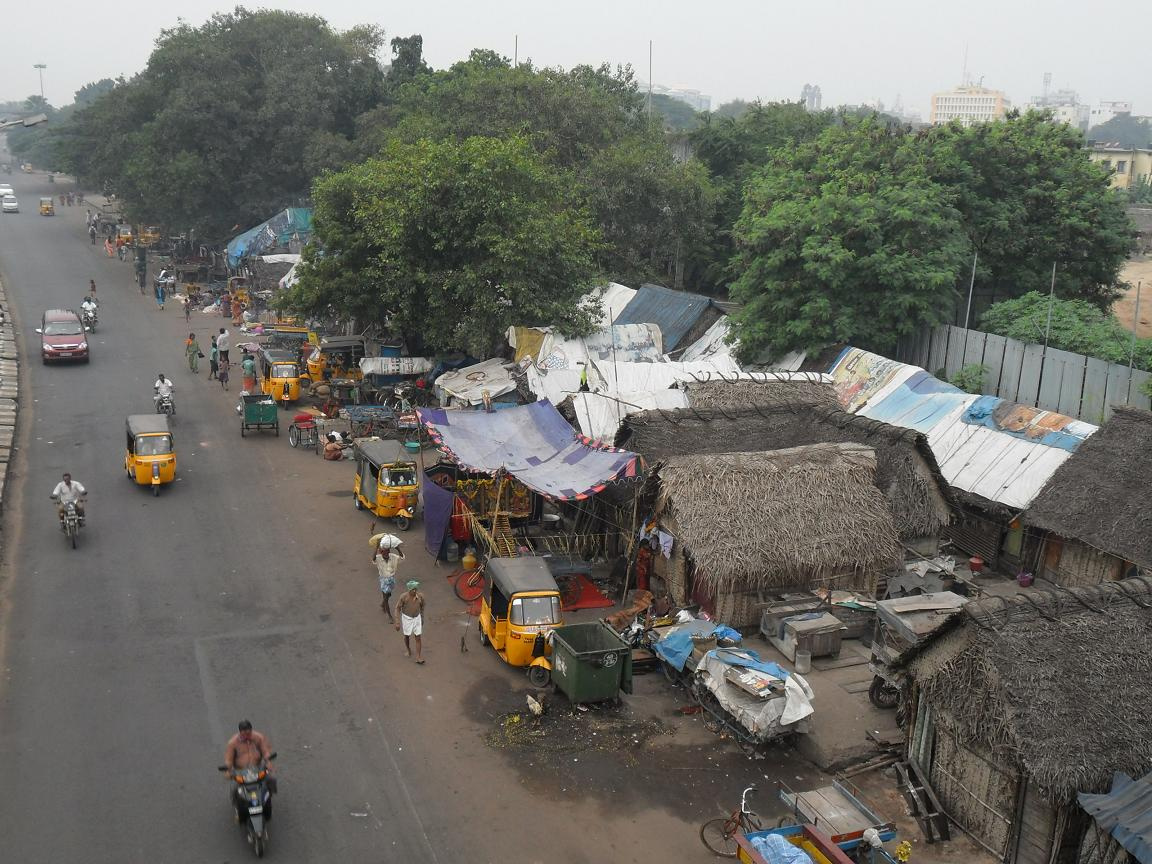

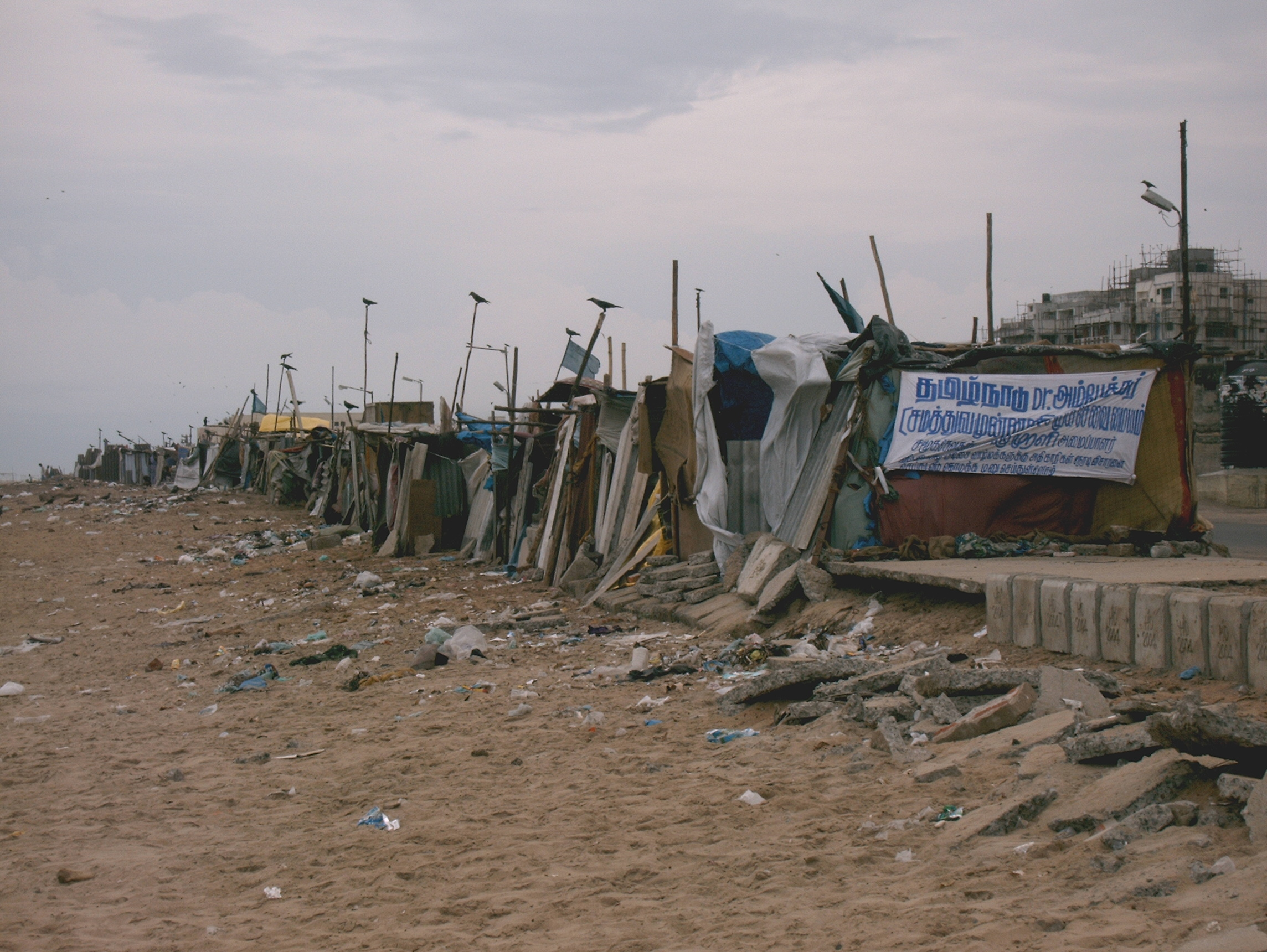

Chennai is the capital city of the South Indian state of Tamil Nadu and is the fourth largest metropolitan city in the country. A total of 30% of Chennai's population resided in slums as of 2011. The state government of Tamil Nadu has established a slum clearance Board, with a minister heading it. Out of the major cities with the highest population in slums, Chennai ranks fourth after Mumbai, Hyderabad and Kolkota. Rapid urbanization and employment in the unorganized sector is the major factor for the slum population in Chennai.

The Tamil Nadu Slum Areas (Improvement & Clearance) Act of 1971 empowered the government to protect the rights of slum dwellers from eviction or relocation. The policy helped in creating the Tamil Nadu Slum Clearance Board (TNSCB), which comes under the Department of Housing of the state government of Tamil Nadu. The slum development works of the government are managed by TNSCB and also externally funded by agencies like World Bank.

== Demographics ==
According to the 2011 Census of India, 30% of Chennaities were living in slums. Chennai (1.39M) is fourth in the list of total slum population among Mumbai (5.21M), Hyderabad (2.29M) and Kolkata (1.41M). As of the provisional population totals of 2001, the slums in Chennai 1,079,414 persons, which constituted 25.6% of the total population of the city. salem and Trichy had 23% and 19% of the population living in slums. Out of the totals in Chennai, 548,517 were males and rest were 530,897 females. The child sex ratio was 968 females to every 1,000 males compared to the non-slum sex-ratio of 945. The literacy rate of the slum population was 80.09% with 85.77% in males and 74.21% in females. There were a total of 125,725 households constituting 81,128 permanent (64.53%), 22,415 semi-permanent (17.83%) and 22,182 temporary households (17.64%). 66.96% of houses had single rooms, 24.19% had two, 5.85% had three and 2.17% had more than three rooms. There were totally 70,689 (56.23%) own houses, 50,764 (40.38%) rented houses and 4,272 (3.39%) other houses. Only 26% of the total population had access to water in the houses, while majority travel at least 500m to get drinking water. Handpumps and pipes are the major sources of water. There were 38,838 (30.89%) hand pumps, 53,556 (42.60%) water pipes, 3,162 (2.52%) tube wells, 4,665 wells and 25,062 (19.93%) other sources of water. Only 79.41% of the slum dwellers had access to electricity and 1,409 households had no access to lighting. Around 34% of the households had no latrines, resulting in spread of diseases. Around 43.87% households had radio while 60.07% households had televisions.

== Factors ==
The major factor contributing to the development of slums is the lack of employment in rural areas and rapid urbanization in Chennai. People migrate from their hometowns to Chennai and get employed in different unorganized sectors. Most of the slums were single room houses and had poor living conditions. The room had to be used for all domestic purposes like cooking, sleeping and cleaning vessels. Most of the slums do not have drainage facilities and open toilets are widely used, resulting in the spread of diseases.

The Chennai MRTS completed in various phases between 1998 and 2004 had infrastructure issues as most of the path was located in slums.

== Government policies ==
According to a study published by Society for Participatory Research in Asia and Indicus Analytics, the urban slums in metropolitan cities contribute to 7% of the Gross Domestic Product (GDP) of the country. The Tamil Nadu government did not have any policy until 1971, though it had notified slums from the pre-independence period of 1932. The Tamil Nadu Slum Areas (Improvement & Clearance) Act of 1971 empowered the government to protect the rights of slum dwellers from eviction or relocation. The policy helped create the Tamil Nadu Slum Clearance Board (TNSCB), which comes under the Department of Housing of the state government of Tamil Nadu. The government also had the power to demolish objectionable slums. Some of the slum development works of the government are externally funded by agencies like World Bank. When the act was enacted in 1971, the Board listed 1202 as slums and 17 more were added to the list by 1985. As per the report released by Resource Centre for the Deprived Urban Communities (IRCDUC) in 2016, the Slum Clearance Board has not listed any more slums, though the slums in the city have been growing. The report mentioned that in situ arrangements are made in the slums. In the name of relocation, the slum dwellers are migrated to faraway places like Kannagi Nagar and Ezhil Nagar, which results in them losing their livelihood. The government under its vision 2023 formulated the idea of building 10,000 flats in Kadambur area at the cost of ₹825 crores. It is planned to be a self-supporting residential structure with infrastructure facilities.
