= Rakesh Basant =

Indian economist and academic

- Education: Gujarat University; Jawaharlal Nehru University; Rajasthan University; Centre for Development Studies
- Occupations: Professor of Economics; Indian Institute of Management, Ahmedabad
- Website: https://www.iima.ac.in/web/faculty/faculty-profiles/rakesh-basant

Prof. Rakesh Basant is an Indian economist and professor at Indian Institute of Management Ahmedabad. He is the JSW Chair Professor of Innovation and Public Policy since October 2016. He was formerly a consultant with World Bank. Currently, he is the Dean, Alumni and External Relations at IIM Ahmedabad.

== Education ==
After an M.A. in economics from Rajasthan University, Jaipur (India), Rakesh Basant obtained an M.Phil. in Applied Economics from Jawaharlal Nehru University, New Delhi (India), in 1981. He eventually completed his PhD in economics from Gujarat University, Ahmedabad, in 1990, with a thesis entitled "Technology Diffusion in an Agrarian Economy: A Study of Agro Mechanical Technology in Gujarat".

== Professional life ==
Basant has been a professor of economics at Indian Institute of Management Ahmedabad. He was among the 3 people considered for the position of Director for the institute. Basant is a member of Sachar Committee, wherein he has expressed views against the disregard for the Committee's terms and references.

He has also delivered invited lectures in several US and European universities including Yale, Princeton, Pennsylvania, Stanford, Berkeley, Lund and the London Business School.

== Bibliography ==
Basant has authored many books, articles, research papers and case studies.

=== Books ===
He has co-authored the following 6 books:

1. Handbook of Muslims in India: Empirical and Policy Perspectives, Oxford University Press; 2010 (Co-Author: Abusaleh Shariff)
2. IT Adoption in the Indian Auto Component Industry, NASSCOM, New Delhi; 2007 (Co-Authors: Pankaj Chandra and Rajdeep Sahrawat)
3. Growth and Transformation of Small Firms in India: Policies for Small Firms in the Globalisation of the Economy, Oxford University Press; 2001 (Co-Authors: Sebastian Morris, K. Das, K. Ramchandran and A. Koshy)
4. Non-Agricultural Employment in Rural India, Rawat Publishers, Jaipur; 1998 (Co-Authors: B.L. Kumar and R. Parthasarathy)
5. Non-Agricultural Employment in India: Trends and Prospects, Sage Publications, New Delhi; 1994 (Co-Author: Pravin Visaria)
6. Agro‑Mechanical Diffusion in a Backward Region, Intermediate Technology Publications, London; 1990 (Co-Author: K.K. Subrahmanian)
