= J. Kanakaraj =

J. Kanagaraj
- Born: 1936 (age 89–90); Maravanmadam, Tamil Nadu, India
- Occupation: Lawyer
- Known for: Madras High Court judge

J. Kanagaraj (born 1936) is a former judge of the Madras High Court. He ceased serving as the State Election Commissioner of Andhra Pradesh following a judgment of the Andhra Pradesh High Court on 29 May 2020.

== Career ==
Kanakaraj was born at Maravanmadam, near Thoothukudi in Tamil Nadu, in 1936. He graduated from university with an M.A. in Mathematics and a Bachelor's in Law. In 1959, he became an advocate in the Madras High Court. He was appointed Additional Government Pleader in 1989 and judge of the High Court in March 1990. On 31 March 1994, Kanakaraj dismissed as a "cock and bull story" a claim by Rakesh Mittal that his 7-story Pleasant Stay Hotel met the building control rules that limited height to two stories. Mittal said the hotel had a basement with five floors, then a ground and first floor. Later, this case was to lead to the conviction of former Chief Minister Jayalalithaa for granting an illegal exemption to the hotel.

=== Post-retirement ===
After retiring from the High Court, he was appointed Chairman of the Sales Tax Special Tribunal for a three-year term. The SIPCOT chemical industry estate in Cuddalore, Tamil Nadu, was investigated in November 2002 by a team from the Indian People's Tribunal headed by J. Kanakaraj. The team reported "a noticeable stench of chemicals in the air." Their report was published in July 2003. It found that "Villages like Kudikadu, Thaikal, Eachangadu and Sonnanchavadi lie in a virtual 'gas chamber' surrounded on three sides by chemical factories and bounded on the fourth by the river". The report said "adequate and appropriate steps have not been taken by regulatory authorities, particularly the TNPCB, to prevent pollution and health damage".

In 2003, J. Kanakaraj was appointed by the Madras High Court to head a committee that recommended moving about 650 hawkers from the streets into a multistoried hawkers' complex in Pondy Bazar, Chennai. The goal was to reduce street congestion. Relocation was delayed since all the hawkers wanted spots on the ground floor. In December 2005, he was on the jury at a Public Hearing on Tsunami Relief and Rehabilitation for Tamil Nadu Coastal Women. During an ownership dispute in 2010, Kanakaraj was appointed Administrator of Tamil Evangelical Lutheran Church. As of 2012, J. Kanakaraj was a member of the Tamil Nadu branch of Transparency International India. He was chairman of the Chevalier T. Thomas Elizabeth College for Women in North Chennai. He had been appointed to this position on 15 December 2002 by a Division Bench of the Madras High Court.

Justice V Kanagaraj was appointed the new State Election Commissioner of Andhra Pradesh in April 2020. Justice Kanagaraj immediately assumed charge "in obedience of the orders" and later called on the Governor at the Raj Bhavan and presented his "charge assumption" report.

Kanagaraj was provided accommodation in a luxury flat in Landmark Pride Apartment at Benz Circle, Vijayawada, for a monthly rent of Rs 1,11,800. The state Panchayat Raj Department provided the necessary furniture and other facilities for his stay during this period. Later, Justice Kanagaraj, who wanted to return to Tamil Nadu, vacated the house. Official sources said that Kanagaraj had assumed that the Panchayat Raj Department would pay the rent of pending 6 lakh.

A police compliant registered in Machavaram police station on house owner for refusing to allow the authorities to pick up the furniture as the rent dues were not paid.
