= Sree Narayana Sevika Samajam =

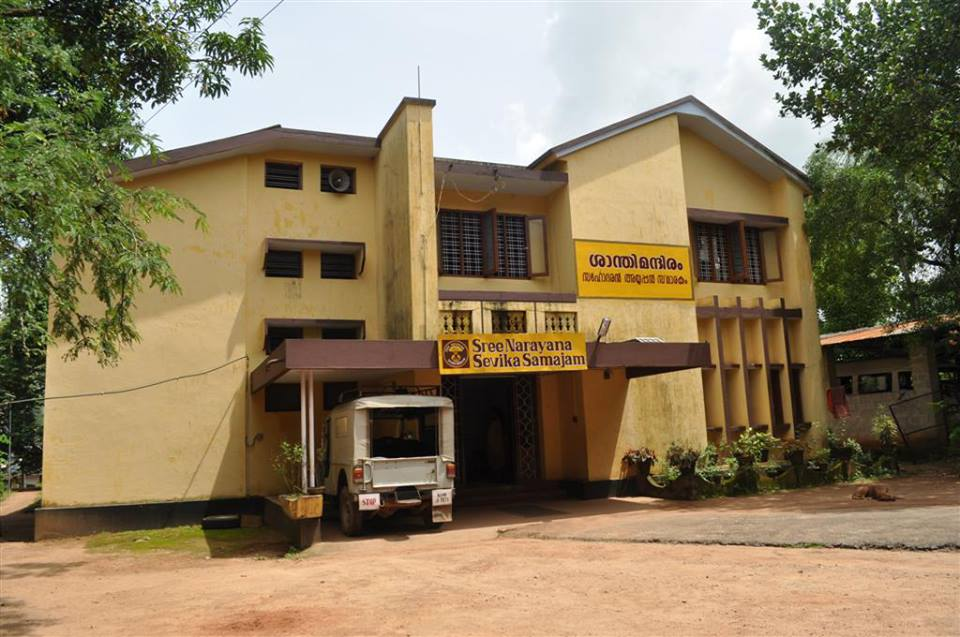
- Formation: 1964
- Type: Non Profitable
- Purpose: Charity
- Headquarters: Aluva
- Secretary: V.P.Seemandini
- Website: http://www.snsevika.org/

Sree Narayana Sevika Samajam is a charitable organization situated at Thottumugham, Aluva, Ernakulam district, Kerala, India which is also known as Sree Narayana Giri. It was established in the year 1965 under Societies Registration Act, Travancore, 1955. Sreenarayana Sevika Samajam seeks to give a home to those who would otherwise have none. An atmosphere of a large family prevails in the orphanage. The institution is totally managed by women.

== History ==
Giri is located on a hill in a village of Keezhumadu, near Thottumugham, about 5 km from Aluva, an industrial town in central Kerala. This hill has close association with the saint and social reformer, Sree Narayana Guru, and his follower, Sahodaran Ayyappan. The Guru used to spend long hours in meditation on this hill. The rock on which he sat is still carefully preserved under a cenotaph.

The land on this hill once belonged to a person convicted for murder. By the time he was released from custody, he had repented his act and later became a disciple of Sree Narayana Guru. The Guru gave him a name, Valmiki. He donated the hill to the Guru and it got the name Valmiki Kunnu(Valmiki Hill). In the course of time, it came to be known as Sree Narayana Giri. It was there that Sahodaran Ayyappan and his wife, Parvathy Ayyappan, set about practicing Sree Narayana Guru's precept that Service to humanity is Service to God. They established the Sree Narayana Sevika Samajam in 1964.

At that time Thottummugham was a backward area inhabited by the weakest sections living in poverty and misery. The first step was to start a school. Getting children to attend classes was not an easy task. Parents refused to send their children unless they were paid at least Rs. 2 every day since the child could have earned that money by begging! Incredible, but true. It took patient cajoling to persuade parents to let their children attend school. Schooling them involved more than teaching them to read and write. The children had to be catalyst for social change and reformation, giving the poorest in society a sense of dignity and hope of betterment.

This lower primary school gives education to the local children up to the fourth standard when they would be about 10 years old. There are eleven teachers, including one for Arabic. Shortly afterwards, a Nursery School was started. There were just 32 children when the Nursery began. Although not directly related to the Nursery School, a balanced and nutritious meal is given to pregnant women, nursing mothers and children below 3 years. This programme, which is funded by the Kerala State Social Welfare Board, has been of a great benefit to women and children of this still relatively poor area.

The institution has been fortunate to elicit appreciation from eminent personalities of different walks of life. Sri. K.R. Narayanan the former president of India visited the institution and recorded his admiration.

== Functions ==
The institution is working in different sectors.

=== Ananda Bhavanam : The Orphanage ===
The idea of starting an orphanage took when a two-year-old boy was brought to Sahodharan Ayyappan with sore covering his body. His parents had died under a train and a policeman found the little boy wandering near the railway station. The child was treated by Sahodharan Ayyappan's son-in-law, who is a doctor. Sahodaran Ayyappan named the boy Jawahar and wished that he too could become the Prime Minister of India, believing that someone who had undergone such trauma in childhood would be motivated to use the machinery of State of good.

Anannda Bhavanam was established so that abandoned children could be given a home. They have successfully created the atmosphere of a family where children feel secure and go through all the usual childhood experience of pranks, fights, sulks and reconciliation. The girls who have grown up here often return after marriage to have their baby, as they would in any normal Indian family.

=== Santhi Mandiram : Home for destitute women ===
This section of the Samajam tries to bring peace to women who have no means to fend for themselves. There are many women staying in this place at present.

=== Visrama Sadanam ===
This part of Samajam looks after women over 60 years of age, who physically or mentally incapacitated.

=== Library ===
A library is also working in Samajam. More than 30000 books are available in the library.
