= National Minorities Development and Finance Corporation =

Indian non-profit organization

National Minorities Development and Finance Corporation (NMDFC) was incorporated in September 1994 as a non profit company under Ministry of Social Justice and Empowerment, Government of India to provide concessional finance for self-employment activities to eligible beneficiaries belonging to the minority communities, having a family income below double the poverty line.

After the establishment of the Ministry of Minority Affairs, the administrative control of NMDFC directed into this ministry.
