= All India Federation of Women Lawyers =

- Abbreviation: AIFWL
- Formation: 2007
- Headquarters: Bangalore
- Location: Bangalore
- Region served: India
- Affiliations: International Federation of Women Lawyers (FIDA)
- Website: www.aifwl.com

All India Federation of Women Lawyers is an association of Indian women lawyers. The federation was established in 2007. It is a registered association under the Societies Registration Act. The federation is affiliated with International Federation of Women Lawyers (FIDA).

== Aims of the Federation ==
1. To uphold The Constitution of India and work for the preservation of the Rule of Law.
2. To uphold the independence of judiciary and to ensure greater efficiency in the administration of justice.
3. To promote the rights and welfare of women and children particularly through legislation and help them in the exercise of their rights.
4. To support, protect and uphold the status, interest, prestige, rights and privileges and dignity of women lawyers.
5. To promote studies in the science of jurisprudence and of comparative laws.
6. To further the dissemination of knowledge of various countries and in particular laws relating to women and children.
7. To study and express opinion upon all central and state legislations and in particular, those concerning or affecting the rights, privileges and interest of women and children.
8. To strive to make access to justice less expensive.

== Presidents of the Federation ==
Mrs. Sheela Anish was the Founder President of the federation and now she is the Director of International Federation of Women Lawyers. Other past presidents have included VP Seemandini, M Bhaskaralakshmi, K Santhakumari, Ami Yagnik and Indrayani Patani. The current president is Hemalata Mahishi a practising lawyer. Many past presidents and other office bearers have been Presidents of their respective state-based Federations of Women Lawyers.

== Conferences of the Federation ==
Past conferences of the Federation included the Asia Woman Lawyers Conference in Bangalore, September 2007; and the AIFWL National Conferences in Kochi (December 2009), Hyderabad (January 2011), Chennai (January 2012), Mumbai (December 2013), Bangalore (November 2014), and Ahmedabad (September 2017).

The federation organised the Asia Woman Lawyers Conference in Bangalore in September 2007, in which Chief Justice of India K. G. Balakrishnan and Chief Justice of Karnataka Cyriac Joseph were present. The Federation, jointly with National Legal Service Authority, organised one seminar on Girl Child on 16 March 2008 and it was a captured on the cover page of the media and the seminar was noticed by the public. The members of AIFWL represented in the International Woman Lawyer's Conference held in Italy in the year 2008. At the National Conference held in Kochi in 2009, V.P.Seemandini was the then president of the federation. The conference was held in Le Meridien International Convention Center. President of India Pratibha Devisingh Patil was the Chief Guest in that conference. In 2012, when the National Conference was held in Chennai, Advocate K.Santhakumari was the President of the Federation.
