= Lingasamudram =

- Village
- Interactive map of Lingasamudram
- Location in Andhra Pradesh, India Lingasamudram (India)
- Coordinates: 15°05′14″N 79°43′22″E
- Country: India
- State: Andhra Pradesh
- District: Prakasam
- Mandal: Lingasamudram

Languages
  - Official: Telugu
- Time zone: UTC+5:30 (IST)
- PIN: 523114
- Telephone code: 08599
- Vehicle registration: AP

Lingasamudram is a village in Prakasam district of the Indian state of Andhra Pradesh. It is located in Lingasamudram mandal.

== Politics ==
Lingasamudram is under Kandukur assembly constituency and Nellore parliament constituency.
