= Slum clearance in India =

Urban renewal approach

Slum clearance in India is used as an urban renewal approach to redevelop and transform poor and low income settlements into new developments or housing. Millions of people live in slum dwellings across India and many migrate to live in the slums from rural villages, often in search of work opportunities. Houses are typically built by the slum dwellers themselves and violence has been known to occur when developers attempt to clear the land of slum dwellings.

Reasons for wanting to clear slums vary, although land value when sold to developers is higher due to the communities that had settled and built their own homes. In some cases, such as in Ahmedabad, Gujarat, slum areas are located in desirable locations, such as on an embankment which provide opportunities for development of higher class housing and commercial units. Occasionally, slums can encroach on areas deemed a safety concern, such as near to railway tracks or on land desired for expansion, such as with Mumbai international airport.

The 2011 census estimated that 65 million people lived in around 108,000 slums across India.

== Context ==
The Slum Areas (Improvement and Clearance Act) of 1956 provided "for the improvement and clearance of slum areas in certain Union territories and for the protection of tenants in such areas from eviction". The first Slum Clearance Board was established by Tamil Nadu, the most urbanised state in India. Under a new Slum Clearance Act, the government must declare areas identified as slums and then either build new, permanent homes or improve living conditions in the slum. Since the board was established in 1971, declaration of slums has only been made twice, once when it was first established with 1200 slums and an additional 17 in 1985.

Several months before the 2010 Commonwealth Games in Delhi, an Indian minister on a visit to London declared that slums no longer existed in India, instead replaced with urban clusters, in response to a question regarding the clearance of slums in India. In Delhi alone, over a million people were displaced by slum clearances between 1998 and 2008. The 2011 Census of India estimated that 65 million people lived in around 108,000 slums across India, of which the state of Maharashtra had the largest number of slums, at around 21,000.

In 2017, around a third of India's then 1.25 billion population lived in cities, with numbers increasing by tens of thousands annually as people migrated away from villages seeking better opportunities, with many ending up in overcrowded slums or on the streets. Shortages of affordable housing resulted in around 25% of the urban population living in informal housing, such as slums.

== Regions ==
=== Mumbai ===
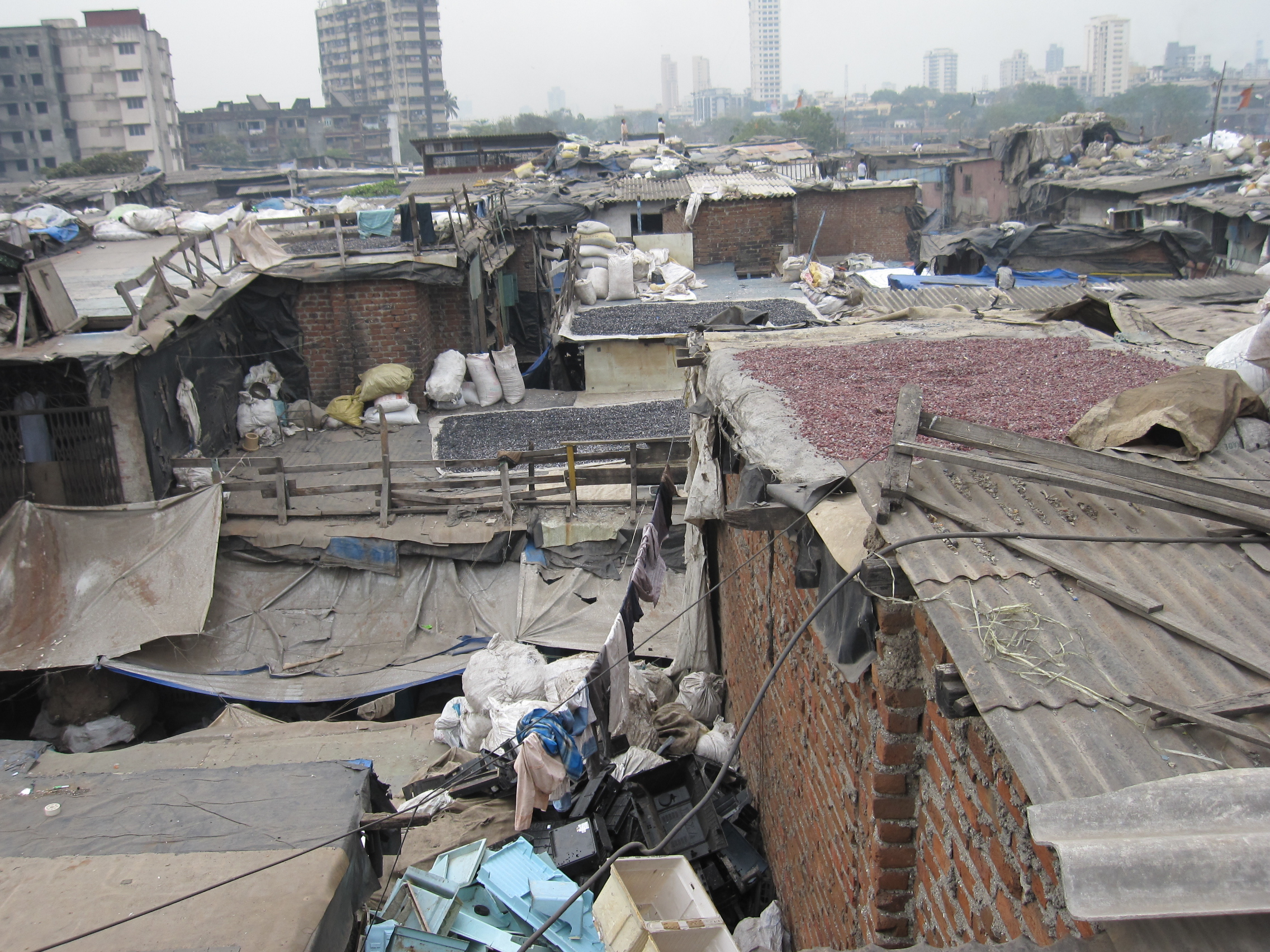
Dharavi slum in Mumbai, pictured in 2008

Between 2008 and 2010, the state government gifted over 500 acres (200 ha) of slum areas to six developments on a first-come-first-serve basis, without any checks taking place on developer's credentials and under Section 3K of the Slum Act, which bypasses the usually mandatory requirement to obtain 70% consent of slum dwellers. Section 3K was added to the act in 1999, although remained unused until nearly 1 decade later to approve a scheme at Golibar in Santa Cruz, involving the redevelopment of 123 acres (50 ha) in August 2008. Despite legal challenges by slum dwellers, the Bombay High Court cleared the development which saw violent protests and residents blocking access to a demolition squad.

In Mumbai, slum residents only have free housing entitlement if they have lived in a cleared area prior to 1995, or 2000 in some cases, a caveat which prevents over 70% of slum dwellers receiving a free home and thus needing to migrate to another slum. In 2011, a battle between residents and a developer occurred in Ganesh Krupa Society, Mumbai's largest slum, as the developer intended on razing the area to make way for a new commercial development. In January 2011, violence occurred when a high court order to evict 45 families failed to be effective, as the families alleged their signatures had been forged, with a resident suggesting that "even a dead woman's signature was forged". By March 2011, over 300 dwellings had already been demolished. The conflict was not unusual, as conflicts between developers and residents had been occurring across the city for over a decade beforehand. In the 12 years up to 2011, just 100,000 homes had been built under slum renewal schemes, yet 35% of people rehoused eventually returned to the slums due to unaffordable costs in their new accommodation. As of 2011 estimates, 1.2 million homes would be required to house the population then living in Mumbai's slums.

=== Nationwide ===
Between January 2011 and September 2013, over 100,000 families were uprooted from slums in the city of Chennai to allow for development of new commercial and apartment structures. The state government made a declaration that Chennai would be free of slums by the end of 2013, prioritising clearing slums on land near the city's waterways for redevelopment. By February 2016, slums still existed in Chennai and around 1,000 families were evicted from the Surya Nagar slum with just 24 hours notice. One family, who were relocated over 20 kilometres (12 mi) away into an eight-story building, experience flooding when it rains and damp which causes illness. In slums, there is a sense of community, with residents holding jobs and a degree of dignity, yet once relocated may find themselves jobless and without knowledge of their neighbours, in what one person described as being "dumped here like orphans with no help". One of the newer resettlement sites is in Perumbakkam, built by the Tamil Nadu state over a period of 20 years to house people displaced by slum clearance, as well as those made homeless by the 2004 Indian Ocean earthquake and tsunami and the 2015 Chennai floods. The outskirts of Chennai was home to around 52,000 families in 2017, whose previous slum houses had been cleared to make way for new roads and flyovers.

Around 2015, a large slum in Shakur Basti was cleared, including the demolition of around 1,200 homes, leaving the residents with nowhere to move to. The land belonged to the Indian Railways, who said clearance was necessary as people had moved too close to the railway tracks, posing “a serious problem for train operations". The clearance resulted in the death of an infant child, although the railways denied any link between the death and the slum clearance.

== Reasons ==
Dunu Roy, an ex-engineer who runs Delhi-based non-profit organisation the Hazard Centre, suggested that a key underlying reason for the drive to clear slums relates to high land value due to the unpaid labour of slum residents and that keeping people's jobs and homes indefinitely insecure helps economic growth. People who move away due to clearance of their slum resettle elsewhere, build new homes and help to increase the value of the land until clearance several years later.

In late 2007, three large settlements in Delhi had eviction notices served, however less than a quarter of households evicted received alternate sites to relocate to. Prior to and during the eviction period, newspapers continually published digital renderings of a proposed promenade to build in place of the slum settlements, but the evictions got little coverage. Around 2011 in Ahmedabad, the largest city in the state of Gujarat, slum dwellers were forcibly uprooted from their slum community they helped to build and relocated over 16 kilometres (9.9 mi) away from their places of work. For the authorities, the cost of rehousing tens of thousands of slum dwellers was worth the price, as slums on the river bank were cleared to regenerate the city's waterfront, similarly to how London built the Thames Embankment during the 19th century. Planners hoped in future, the area could "become a Gujarati equivalent to the Thames or the Seine", with slum houses replaced with grand residences. Around a similar time, Mumbai International Airport was looking to expand into land right next to the airport which was occupied by slums. The clearance scheme, which would have required around 88,000 families to be relocated, was opposed by residents, some of whom were not eligible for new housing, while others who were did not want to be separated from their community, jobs and education. The scheme, which involved constructing a third terminal and expanding the existing runway on 276 acres (112 ha) of the airport's land, was cancelled in 2014 as relocation of residents and clearance of the slums could not be achieved within the allotted time permitted.

== Impact ==
Clearance of slums for economic redevelopment often overlooks the human cost and impact on the break-up of communities. Outcry from the public has been long-standing and a report published by advocacy groups show evictions have violated government guidelines. Even after getting evicted and relocated from their slums, there was no guarantee on the quality of their new housing or their access to public utilities. They may have to wait several years before getting any sort of such resources. Food, such as vegetables and rice can cost around or more than double the price than near or in slum settlements, while reduced transport links makes it harder for people to travel, particularly for work.

Communities that are well established in slums are dispersed and relocated to new settlements, often mixed with families from other slums. In one new development, families from different settlements were rehoused into a single building. Combining people with differing customs and cultures created unfamiliarity and distrust.

Throughout 2018, authorities were demolishing an average of 114 houses per day, affecting 23 people on average per hour, which across the whole year amounted to over 41,700 homes and an estimated 200,000 people, although no official data exists on evictions. Evictions and clearance of slums became a core issue in the lead-up to the 2019 Indian general election.

== See also ==
- Slum clearance in the United Kingdom
