= V. R. Krishna Iyer =

Indian judge (1915–2014)

Justice V. R. Krishna Iyer
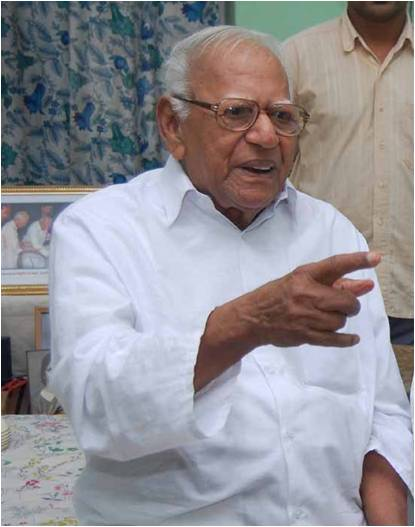

Judge of Supreme Court of India
- In office 17 July 1973 – 14 November 1980
- Nominated by: Ajit Nath Ray
- Appointed by: V. V. Giri

Judge of Kerala High Court
- In office 12 July 1968 – 16 July 1973
- Nominated by: M. Hidayatullah
- Appointed by: Zakir Husain

Minister of Home Affairs of Kerala
- In office 5 April 1957 – 31 July 1959
- Chief Minister: E. M. S. Namboodiripad
- Portfolio(s): Law; Prisons; Electricity; Social Welfare; Irrigation; Inland Water
- Preceded by: Position established
- Succeeded by: V. K. Velappan (Electricity); K. Chandrasekaran (Law)

Member of Kerala Legislative Assembly
- In office 1957–1965
- Preceded by: C. H. M. Kanaran (as member of Madras Legislative Assembly)
- Succeeded by: K. P. R. Gopalan
- Constituency: Thalassery

Member of Madras Legislative Assembly
- In office 1952–1956
- Preceded by: Constituency established
- Succeeded by: P. R. Kurup (as member of Kerala Legislative Assembly)
- Constituency: Kuthuparamba

Personal details
- Born: 15 November 1915 Palghat, Malabar District, Madras Presidency, British India (present day Palakkad, Kerala, India)
- Died: 4 December 2014 (aged 99) Kochi, Ernakulam, Kerala, India
- Spouse: Sarada (m. 1941; died 1974)
- Awards: Padma Vibhushan
- Autobiography: Wandering in Many Worlds

Vaidyanathapuram Rama Krishna (15 November 1915 – 4 December 2014) was an Indian judge who became a pioneer of judicial activism. He pioneered the legal-aid movement in the country. Before that, he was a state minister and politician.

As an activist lawyer, he served jail terms for the cause of his poor and underprivileged clients. He was seen as a human-rights activist, and also campaigned for social justice and the environment. A sports enthusiast and a prolific author, he was conferred with the Padma Vibhushan in 1999. His judgements continue to be cited in the higher judiciary.

== Early life and education ==
Krishna Iyer was born in a Tamil Hindu family on 15 November 1915 in Vaidyanathapuram village in Palakkad, which was part of the then Malabar region of the then Madras State, to a lawyer father, Rama, and Narayani Ammal. He was the eldest among the seven children born to his parents, among whom, the youngest, V. R. Lakshminarayanan, served as the Director General of Police in Tamil Nadu Police. He inherited from his father an avid interest in the community around and using the law for the benefit of those more in need.

He was educated at Basel Evangelical Mission Parsi High School, Thalassery, Government Vocational Higher Secondary School, Koyilandy, Government Victoria College, Palakkad, Annamalai University, and at Dr. Ambedkar Government Law College, Chennai. He started practice in his father's chamber in 1938 at Thalassery, Malabar. In 1948, when he protested the evil of torture by police for interrogation, he was imprisoned for a month on a fabricated charge of giving legal assistance to communists.

== Career ==
=== Legal Practice ===
He joined the Bar in 1938, beginning his practice in the chambers of his father, V. V. Rama Aiyar, who was a lawyer in Thalassery in the State of Kerala.

=== Political career ===
He was elected to the Madras Legislative Assembly in 1952, from Kuthuparamba as a non-party, independent candidate, and served until 1956. In 1957, he sought reelection from the Thalassery constituency as an independent candidate. He was supported by the Communist Party of India. He was a Minister between 1957 and 1959 in the government led by E. M. S. Namboodiripad, holding the portfolios for Home, Law, Prison, Electricity, Irrigation, Social Welfare and Inland Water. He initiated legal-aid to the poor, jail reforms incorporating the rights of prisoners, and set up more courts and rescue homes for women and children. He got several labour and land reform laws passed. He resolved an inter-state water dispute between the newly formed neighbouring states, Kerala and Tamil Nadu. When this government was dismissed by the central government, he resumed legal practice in August 1959. He lost the 1965 assembly election, which he again contested as an independent candidate.

=== Judicial career ===
He was appointed a judge of the Kerala High Court on 12 July 1968. He was elevated as judge of the Supreme Court of India on 17 July 1973. Following this, a group of lawyers had written a letter published in The Times of India, objecting to his appointment as a judge.

=== Law Commission of India ===
Iyer was a member of the Law Commission of India from 1971 to 1973 where he drafted a comprehensive report, which would lead to the legal-aid movement in the country.

== Jurisprudence ==
Iyer made notable contributions in the field of constitutional law, focusing on social, political, and civil rights. He was noted for his use of literary references in his judgments.

=== Public Interest Litigation ===
Iyer made notable contributions to public interest litigation at the Supreme Court of India, and relaxed the rules regarding standing in a number of cases in order to allow the Court to hear and decide on socially significant matters. On a number of occasions, Iyer utilised the Supreme Court's suo motu jurisdiction to hear cases based on letters or postcards written to the Court, raising awareness about social concerns. Along with Justice P. N. Bhagwati, he introduced the concept of PILs (Public Interest Litigations) or "people's involvement" in the country's courts with a series of cases. This revolutionary tool, initially used by public-spirited citizens to file PILs on behalf of sections of society unable to on their own, continues to bring in unheard changes in the day-to-day lives of the people even now, decades later. Observing this, he states: ?

=== Jurisprudence during the Emergency ===
In June 1975, the Allahabad High Court had ruled that Prime Minister Indira Gandhi's election to Parliament was unlawful, and barred her from it for another six years. Iyer was on the bench that heard an appeal against this order in the Supreme Court. In Indira Gandhi v Raj Narain, he ruled that although Mrs. Gandhi could no longer be a Member of Parliament, she was entitled to retain her position as Prime Minister.

Rebuffing favour-seekers, he heard a challenge to this order in the Supreme Court. He was both blamed for granting a conditional stay and praised for refusing an unconditional stay. Interpreting this as losing the popular mandate to rule, the Opposition called for her resignation. The next day she declared a state of Emergency in the country.

=== Social Rights ===
Iyer wrote judgments in several notable cases concerning social rights. These included Maneka Gandhi v. Union of India, in which he held that Article 21 of the Indian Constitution, which protects the right to life and liberty, must be interpreted widely to include several social rights. In the Ratlam Municipality case, he started a trend for judges to leave the courtroom and go out and see, the situation on the ground. Moreover, this case would be a forerunner of cases which would be decided later on, on the concepts of "precautionary principle", "polluter pays" and "sustainable development". In Muthamma's case, Iyer called for breaking the 'glass ceiling' with gender parity in traditional practices in public employment.

=== Civil and Political Rights ===
Iyer ruled in several cases that aimed to secure against custodial violence, ruling on bail conditions as well as regarding legal aid for detainees. Iyer also ruled against the practice of establishing special courts for cases involving politically connected persons. Iyer advocating criminal justice based on corrective measures, and opposed retributive justice, calling for therapies such as meditation within prison environments to help decrease recidivism. He also ruled against the practice of solitary confinement.

Iyer was an opponent of the death penalty, laying down the standard that it could only be imposed in the "rarest of rare" cases. In Ediga Anamma v State of Andhra Pradesh, he established the jurisprudence governing the commuting of death sentences to imprisonment for life, identifying mitigating factors that could be applied in such cases.

== Public life post-retirement and death ==
He retired as a judge on 14 November 1980 but, continued to advocate the cause of justice, on every forum and through his writings, participating in street protests, and his house would always remain open, bustling with all who sought his help or advice. He stood for the nation's president in 1987, as the Opposition's candidate against R. Venkataraman, the ruling Congress's nominee who won. In 2002, he inquired into the Gujarat riots as part of a citizens' panel, with retired Justice P. B. Sawant among others. He also headed the Kerala Law Reform Commission in 2009. He had been active, almost until a few weeks before his death, when ill-health and advancing age took their toll on him. As a public intellectual Iyer held several positions in the people's organizations, arts societies, sports councils, and cultural groupings.

He died on 4 December 2014 in the hundredth year of his life, and was cremated with state honours. His wife Sarada, who would listen to him talk about his work, when on occasion he would change his mind after she gave her opinion on it, had predeceased him in 1974, after 33 years of marriage. Upon his demise, his private library was donated to the National University of Advanced Legal Studies, where the Justice Krishna Iyer Collection still resides. He is survived by his two sons, Ramesh and Paramesh.

== Publications ==
He has to his credit 70–100 books, mostly on law, and four travelogues. He has also authored a book in Tamil, Neethimandramum Samanvya Manithanum. Leaves from My Personal Life is his autobiography. There are around five published books by other authors about him.

| Name of the book | Year | Publisher |
|---|---|---|
| Law and the People | 1972 | Peoples Publishing House, Rani Jhansi Road, New Delhi. |
| Law, Freedom and Change | 1975 | Affiliated East West Press Pvt. Ltd., 5, General Patters Road, Madras |
| Law India, Some Contemporary Challenges | 1976 | University College of Law, Nagpur. |
| Jurisprudence and Juris-Conscience à la Gandhi | 1976 | Gandhi Peace Foundation, 221/3-Deen Dayal Upadhyaya Marg, New Delhi-2 |
| Social Mission of Law | 1976 | Orient Longmans Ltd., 160, Anna Salai, Madras-2 |
| Law & Social Change and Indian Overview | 1978 | Publication Bureau, Panjab University, Chandigarh |
| "Leaves From My Personal Life" | 2001 | Gyan Publishing House |
| Social Justice and the Handicapped Humans | 1978 | The Academy of Legal Publications, Punnan Road, Trivandrum-695001 |
| The Integral Yoga of Public Law and Development in the Context of India | 1979 | The Institute of Constitutional & Parliamentary Studies, Vithal Bhai Patel House, Rafi Marg, New Delhi |
| Of Law & Life | 1979 | Vikas Publishing House Pvt. Ltd., 20/4 Industrial Area, Ghaziabad, U.P. |
| A Constitutional Miscellany | 1986 | Eastern Book Company |
| Life After Death | 2005 | DC Books, Kottayam |
| Wandering in Many Worlds | 2009 | Pearson Education |
| Random Reflections | 2004 | Universal Law Publication |
| The Indian Law (Dynamic Dimensions of the Abstract) | 2009 | Universal Law Publishing |

== Awards and distinctions ==
Iyer received several awards and distinctions during his life, including:

- Soviet Land Nehru Award, 1968.
- Sri. Jehangir Gandhi Medal and Award for Industrial Peace, 1982.
- Distinguished Fellow, Indian Law Institute, New Delhi.
- The Kumarappa – Reckless Award, 1988. (The Indian Society of Criminology)
- Baba Saheb B.R. Ambedkar National Award by the Bharatiya Dalit Sahitya Akademi.
- Ramasramam Award 1992.
- Justice Krishna iyer was awarded the*Title of 'Living Legend of Law"by the International Bar Association in 1995 in recognition of outstanding service to the legal profession internationally and for commitment to the Rule of Law.
- M. A. Thomas National Human Rights Award for 1998.
- Padma Vibhushan Award by the President of India in 1999 (the Highest Award next to Bharath Ratna).
- Recipient of Vyloppilli Award 1999 for the meritorious service in the fields Human Rights, law, administration etc. The Award was given in February 2000 by the Sahrudaya Vedi, Thrissur.
- 'The Order of Friendship', by President Putin in October 2000, Russia's high state honour for personal contribution in strengthening the ties of traditional and time-tested friendship, co-operation and everlasting affection between the two nations.
- Honorary doctorate from University of Calicut in 2003.

== See also ==
- List of animal rights advocates
