= Mass graves of Jammu and Kashmir =

Mass graves of Jammu and Kashmir are mass grave sites in Jammu and Kashmir that were created as a result of extra-judicial killings during the Insurgency in Kashmir. An ad-hoc inquiry led by human rights lawyer, Parvez Imroz, has found more than 6,000 unmarked and mass graves.

In 2009, International People’s Tribunal on Human Rights and Justice, a human rights group, released a report saying that 2,700 ‘unknown, unmarked, and mass graves,’ containing at least 2,900 bodies, in 55 villages in North Kashmir's three districts — Bandipora, Baramulla, and Kupwara — were probed. The group demanded an independent investigation into the unmarked mass graves in Jammu and Kashmir and an immediate halt of such crimes.

In 2011, a Jammu and Kashmir State Human Rights Commission report titled Enquiry Report of Unmarked Graves in North Kashmir said that it found bullet-riddled remains of 2,730 people in dozens of unmarked mass graves after a three-year inquiry. Many of those were civilians with 574 being identified as local residents. According to the report, these unidentified dead bodies buried in various unmarked graves at thirty-eight places of north Kashmir’s Baramulla, Bandipora, Handwara, and Kupwara districts, "may contain the dead bodies of enforced disappearances". The Human Rights Watch (HRW) demanded Indian authorities to "immediately open an independent, transparent, and credible investigation into the unmarked graves discovered" in J&K. Meenakshi Ganguly, South Asia director at HRW said that "these graves suggest the possibility of mass murder". Following the report, Amnesty International also asked the Government of India to "initiate thorough investigations into unmarked graves".

In 2017, J&K's human rights commission asked the government in Kashmir to investigate the discovery of at least 2,080 unmarked mass graves. Khurram Parvez of the Association of Parents of Disappeared Persons (APDP), a human rights group in Kashmir, demanded "an independent commission to do a credible probe on the mass graves". The NGO estimates the number of enforced disappearances in Kashmir's insurgency at around 8,000 men and boys.
