= Asia Democracy and Human Rights Award =

Award by the Taiwan Foundation for Democracy

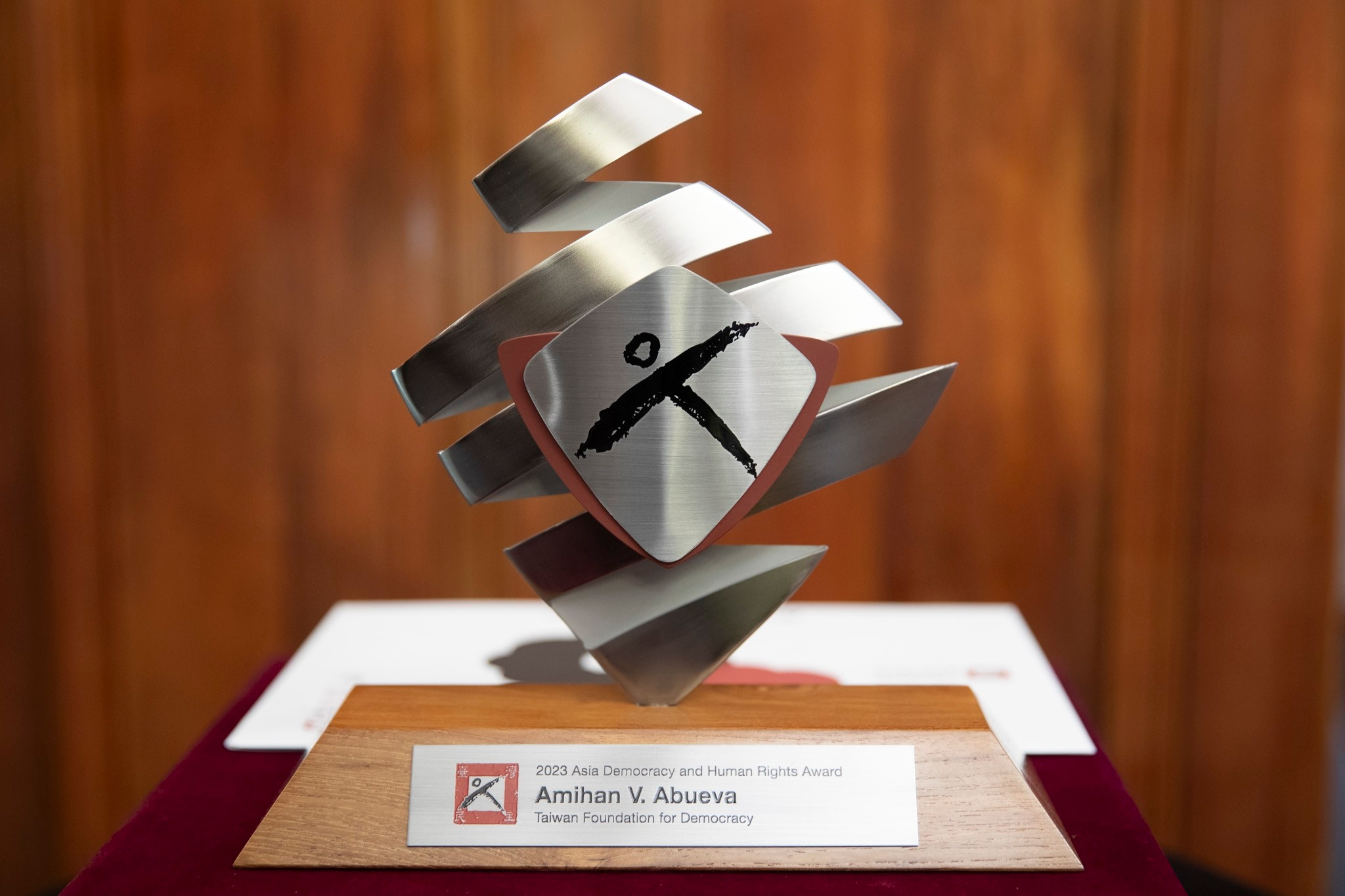
2023 trophy of the award

Since 2006, the Taiwan Foundation for Democracy confers the Asia Democracy and Human Rights Award on an individual or organization that has made major contributions through peaceful means to the development of democracy in Asia or human rights in Asia. Every year the award is conferred in December in Taipei during a special ceremony.

== Winners ==
Year	Name	Effort
2006	Reporters Without Borders	Leading international press freedom organization
2007	Dr. Cynthia Maung	Founder of the Mae Tao Clinic on the Thai-Burma border
2008	Dr. Sima Samar	Chairperson of the Afghanistan Independent Human Rights Commission and founder of the Shuhada Organization.
2009	Kim Seong-min	Founder and director of Free North Korea Radio
2010	Rescue Foundation	Anti-human trafficking organization
2011	Boat People SOS	Combating human trafficking, protecting refugees and developing civil societies
2012	ECPAT International	Opposing trafficking and sexual exploitation of children
2013	Karen Human Rights Group	Documenting human rights abuses in Burma
2014	Centre for Human Rights and Development	Defending human rights in Sri Lanka
2015	Sunita Danuwar	Supporting victims of human trafficking in Nepal
2016	Asian Federation Against Involuntary Disappearances	Working to resolve the problem of forced disappearances in Asia
2017	Bersih 2.0	Regional organization working on the reform of transparent and fair election
2018	Gusdurian Network Indonesia (GNI)	Defending victims of conflicts that arise from religious differences and suppression of minority groups
2019	Diplomacy Training Program	Promoting human rights in the Asia-Pacific region through training and capacity building
2020	Asia Pacific Forum of National Human Rights Institutions	Provide assistance and support to National Human Rights Institutions
2021	Humaira Rasuli	Afghan human rights lawyer and the co-founder of the Women for Justice Organization
2022	Fortify Rights	Research on human rights and support for human rights defenders in Southeast Asia
2023	Amihan Abueva	Promoting children’s rights and welfare in Asia
2024	Odhikar	Defending human rights and democracy in Bangladesh
2025	Indonesian Legal Aid and Human Rights Association (PBHI)	Promoting human rights and ensuring access to justice in Indonesia
