= Sudhir Pattnaik =

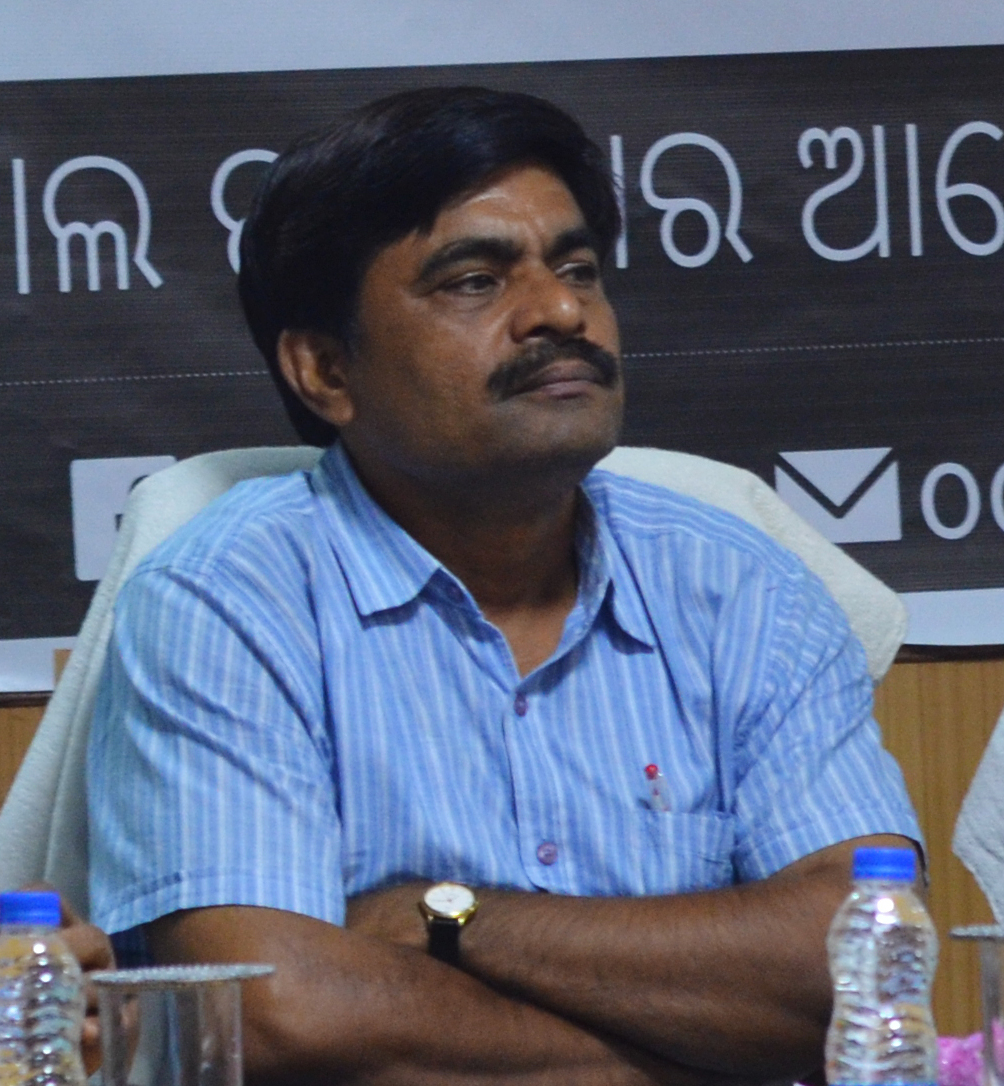
- Pattnaik in Bhubaneswar.
- Occupation: Journalist
- Known for: Samadrusti

Sudhir Pattnaik (born 1962) is a journalist and a social activist from Orissa, India. He is the editor of Samadrusti, a fortnightly political and social news magazine in the Odia language published from Bhubaneswar.

== Career ==
Sudhir Pattnaik was a member of a research team supported by the Planning Commission of the government of India that produced a March 2005 258-page report on "Development Policies and Rural Poverty in Orissa: Macro Analysis and Case Studies". He was a member of an Indian People's Tribunal led by K.K. Usha, former chief justice of the Kerala High Court and convened by Angana P. Chatterji and Mihir Desai, which investigated communal violence in Orissa, publishing a report on the subject in September 2006.

Pattnaik is the chairman of Independent Media, a group of filmmakers, writers and journalists in the state of Orissa. He edits the Samadrusti news magazine, founded in 2005 as an alternative to mainstream newspapers, which first appeared in January 2006. In 2009 Pattnaik initiated a project to make a video series called Madhyantara. The episodes document aspects of life in Orissa including forced moves, pollution and human rights abuses. They are mostly filmed by journalists, activists and amateurs. His Samadrusti TV has produced 21 short films on various issues. These are circulated in remote villages where people are often illiterate and unable to read the magazine.

== Views ==
Sudhir Patanaik has described development as a game "for the rich few at the cost of millions of poor and deprived". He stresses the need to make the voices of marginalised people heard, to bring them into the mainstream discussions about development which are often dominated by academic or government documents that pay no attention to the realities faced by the people of the state.

Pattnaik has said "Democracy in our country is weak, as we have never fought for democracy; it has evolved through a number of stages. Our model of democracy is growth oriented and the emphasis is on resource exploitation". Pattnaik has described Orissa as a "DFID colony", referring to the British Department for International Development (DFID). He complains that DFID-initiated reforms have resulted in many multinational mining and industrial companies opening up operations in the state, but the result has been to displace people from the land without adequate compensation. He has attacked the proposed Vedanta University project supported by the Naveen Patnaik Government. He claims that Anil Agarwal, chairman of Vedanta Resources, has proposed establishing the university as a ruse to gain land to be used for mining and industry.

== Bibliography ==
- Sudhir Pattnaik (2008). India's Foreign Policy. Arise Publishers & Distributors. ISBN 978-8189937621.
