= Triveni Acharya =

Indian journalist and activist

- Organization: Rescue Foundation
- Awards: Asia Democracy and Human Rights Award (2010); Civil Courage Prize (2011); World of Children Humanitarian Award (2013)

Triveni Acharya is an Indian journalist and activist living in Mumbai, best known for her work with the anti-sex-trafficking group the Rescue Foundation.

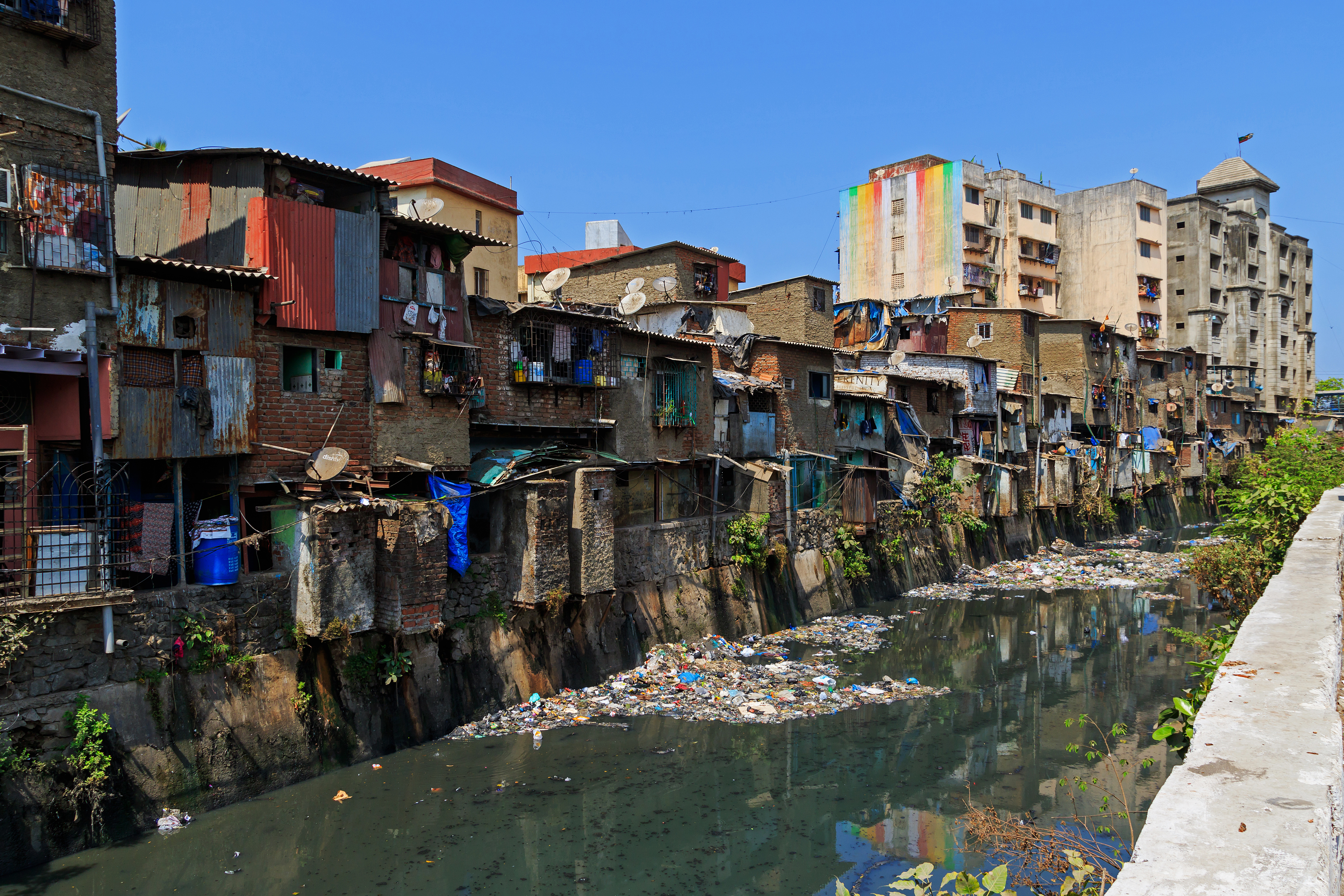
The neighborhood frequented by Acharya as a child

The group was founded by her husband, Balkrishna Acharya, but Triveni Acharya assumed its presidency following his death in a car accident in 2005. The organization is devoted to the "rescue, rehabilitation and repatriation of victims for human trafficking from different parts of India, Nepal & Bangladesh and sold for forced prostitution", and has been conducting "brothel raids" since 1993. The organization frees roughly 300 girls a year, and also provides counseling, job training, and HIV testing. Because these raids often result in serious financial loss or imprisonment for sex traffickers, Acharya has received several death threats as the result of her work.

The Rescue Foundation has received several national and international awards for its work under Acharya's presidency. In 2004, the acharya received Jhansi Ki Rani Lakshmi Bai (for courage). Taiwanese president Ma Ying-Jeou presented the Acharya the Asia Democracy and Human Rights Award of the Taiwan Foundation for Democracy, along with a cash grant of US$100,000; the organization had been nominated for the award by a former trafficking victim saved by the Foundation. In 2011, Acharya herself won the Civil Courage Prize of The Train Foundation, awarded annually to those "who resolutely combat evil". She shared the prize with Lydia Cacho Ribeiro, a Mexican journalist also awarded for her efforts against "sex trafficking, domestic violence and child pornography". In 2013, Triveni became the 2013 Humanitarian Honoree of World of Children Award in conjunction with her work with The Rescue Foundation. Along with the recognition the award came with a $75,000 cash grant.
