= Aasia Jeelani =

Kashmiri journalist and human rights activist

Aasia (or Aasiya) Jeelani (1974–2004) was a Kashmiri journalist and human rights activist. After completing her studies in Srinagar, Kashmir, she worked for Agence France Presse (AFP) and then the Times of India. She set up the Association of Parents of Disappeared Persons (APDP) and the Kashmiri Women's Initiative for Peace and Disarmament (KWIPD), editing the latter's newsletter. On 20 April 2004, Jeelani and other activists were monitoring elections when the car she was travelling in was blown up by an improvised explosive device and she was killed. She is remembered as a pioneering feminist journalist.

== Life ==
Aasia Jeelani was born on 9 February 1974, in Srinagar, Kashmir. She was educated at the Presentation Convent Higher Secondary School, then completed a Ba in Science at Government College for Women, Nawakadal Srinagar followed by a MA in Journalism at Kashmir University. She grew up during the insurgency in Jammu and Kashmir and began to write about the human rights abuses perpetrated by Indian soldiers. Between 1998 and 2001, she worked for Agence France Presse (AFP). She then moved to Delhi to work at the Times of India before deciding to return to Kashmir and joining the Jammu and Kashmir Coalition of Civil Society (JKCCS). She set up the Association of Parents of Disappeared Persons (APDP) and the Kashmiri Women's Initiative for Peace and Disarmament (KWIPD). She was editor of a newsletter which the KWIPD published every three months called The Voices Unheard.

On 20 April 2004, Jeelani and other activists were monitoring elections near to the Line of Control at Chandigam in Kupwara district. The car she was travelling in was blown up by an improvised explosive device triggered by militants; she died, the driver was also killed and her colleague Khurram Parvez sustained serious injuries, having a leg amputated.

== Legacy ==
Jeelani is remembered as a pioneering feminist journalist. The Jammu and Kashmir Coalition of Civil Society gave her an award named after Robert Thorpe. In 2013, the Coalition commemorated the death of Jeelani by bringing together human rights groups in order to discuss institutional violence. The meeting asked the United Nations to send an investigator to the region.
