= 1991 Kunan Poshpora incident =

Mass rape in Kashmir

The Kunan Poshpora incident was a mass rape that occurred on 23 February 1991 when a unit of the Indian security forces, after being fired upon by militants, launched a search operation in the twin villages of Kunan and Poshpora, located in Kashmir's remote Kupwara district. While the first information report filed in the local police station after a visit by the local magistrate reported the number of women who reported rape as 23, the Human Rights Watch assessed the number of survivors to be up to 100.

The accusations were denied by the Indian army as the government "determined that the evidence was not sufficient" and issued a statement condemning the accusations as "terrorist propaganda".

The government's investigations into the incident rejected the reports as "baseless". However, international human rights organizations have expressed serious doubts about the integrity of these investigations and the manner in which they were conducted. Human Rights Watch stated that the government had launched a "campaign to acquit the army of charges of human rights violations and discredit those who brought the charges."

== Incident ==
The New York Times had quoted the residents of the Kunan Poshpora neighbourhood stating that militants had fired on security forces nearby, which prompted the search operation by the forces. On 23–24 February 1991, soldiers from the 4th Rajputana Rifles conducted the search operation and cordoned the neighbouring villages of Kunan and Poshpora. According to testimonies from male villagers, men were detained across three locations where they were subject to torture throughout the night. Reported methods included beatings, electric shocks, and headfirst submersion in water mixed with chilis. Several men described hearing women scream from nearby homes.

Local women said around 40 individuals had been raped during the operation, often by multiple soldiers. Three weeks after the incident, 32 women and girls aged between 15 and 70 underwent medical examination at a nearby medical centre. The examining physician documented widespread abrasions and contusions across all those examined. The medical report also noted that one male villager had genital burns caused by electric shocks. Political Scientist Sumantra Bose stated that it appeared many teenage girls did not seek medical examination due to social stigma.

Statements by the villagers further noted an incident where one crying baby was thrown through a ground-floor window into the snow. At dawn, Abdul Ghani, a local police constable, retrieved the child and placed them on the home's verandah before going from house to house covering the women and girls with blankets.

Later on the local leader of the Hizb-e-Islami militant group gave an interview to the New York Times in which he denied the claim that the group had shot first, but added that his commandos were armed to fight the forces off.

== Investigations ==
The Press Council of India investigated the case in summer 1991 and concluded that the rape reports could not be proven. Following that, the government declared the case as "unfit for launching criminal prosecution" in September 1991 and closed it a month later.

The Press Council's conclusions were criticised by the Human Rights Watch which stated that the results of the examinations still raised questions about the activity of the Indian army in Kunan Poshpora. According to HRW, the Press Council's investigative committee had dismissed any evidence that may contradict the government version of events. The HRW report accused the committee of being focused on shielding the Indian government from criticism rather than uncovering truth.

The United States Department of State, in its 1992 report on international human rights, stated that there was "credible evidence" that supports the mass rape charges against the army unit at Kunan Poshpora.

== Litigation ==
In 2004, one of the alleged victims approached the J&K State Human Rights Commission seeking a reinvestigation of the case. In 2007, more women asked the SHRC to reopen of the case. The villagers from the two villages formed Kunan-Poshpora Coordination Committee (KCC) headed by 70-year-old man Ghulam Ahmad Dar to seek justice for the victims.

In October 2011, the Jammu & Kashmir Human Rights Commission asked the J&K government to reinvestigate the reported mass rape case and compensate the victims.

A writ petition filed in the Jammu and Kashmir High Court in 2013 alleged that more than 30 women had been raped. The charges had not been proved and there had been no progress in trial. The High Court observed that it hoped the committee appointed by the J&K government would examine and quickly implement the recommendations of the SHRC.

In December 2017, the J&K government approached the Supreme Court of India against orders of the High Court. The top court directed that the appeals should be heard expeditiously.

== Social impact ==
The Indian Express reported on 21 July 2013 that the victims and their families were being socially ostracised by other villagers in the locality. The only government school in the two affected villages teaches up to standard eight. The students going for higher education in the nearby Trehgam and Kupwara were taunted due to the incident and most of them choose to drop out after class eight. Families not involved in the incident at the same villages have disassociated socially with the victims' families. Villagers claimed that it was difficult to find grooms for their children.

In February 2026, Azim Premji University Sarjapura was vandalized by Akhil Bharatiya Vidyarthi Parishad for allowing a reading circle to conduct a discussion program titled Kunan Poshpora in the campus.

== See also ==
- Do You Remember Kunan Poshpora?
- Rape during the Kashmir conflict
