= Cynthia Maung =

Burmese doctor (born 1959)

- S'gaw Karen: စ့န်သံအါမီင် Burmese: စင်သီယာမောင်
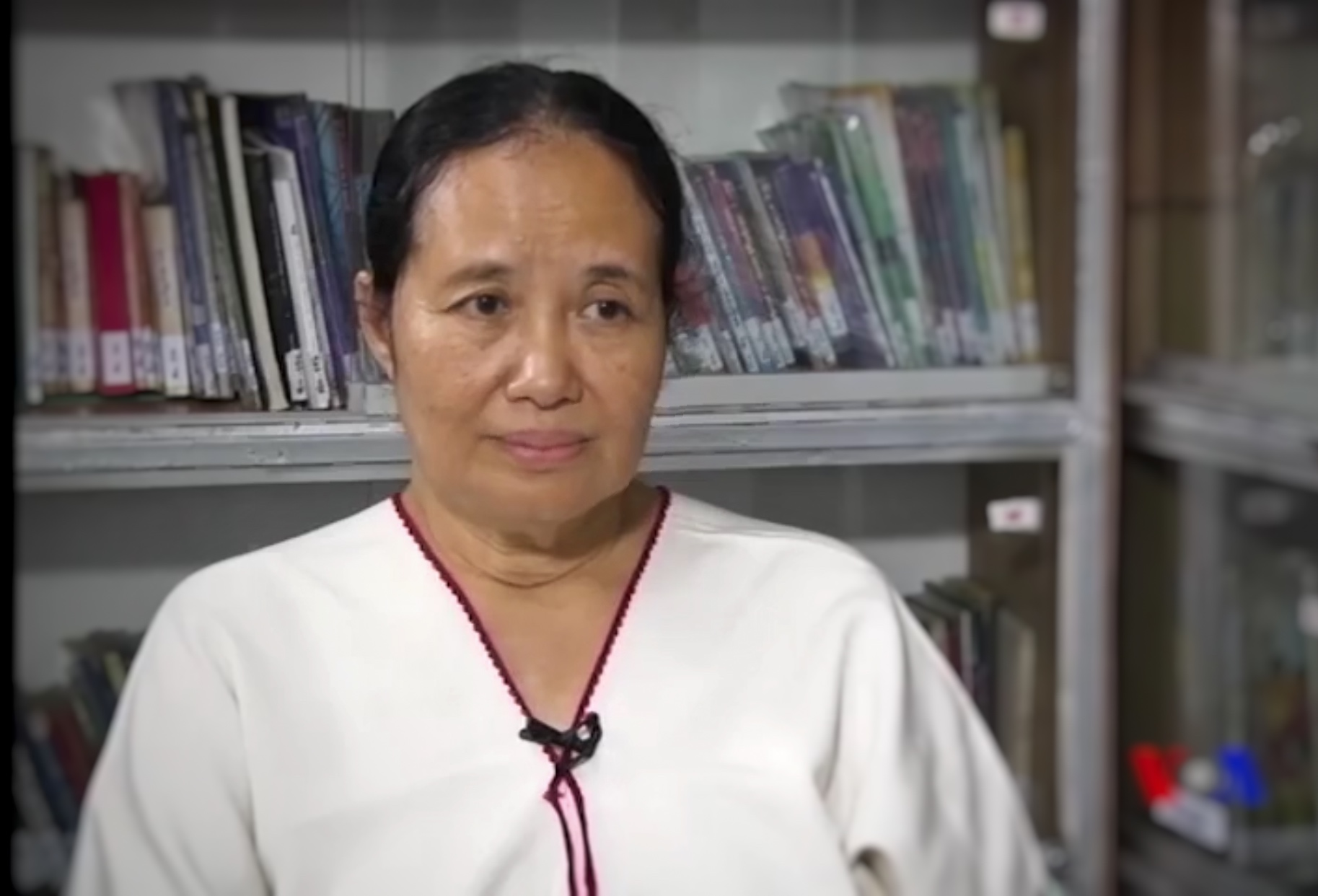
- Born: 6 December 1959 (age 66); Insein Township, Rangoon, Burma
- Education: Institute of Medicine-2, Rangoon; Mawlamyine Regional College
- Occupation: Physician
- Spouse: Kyaw Hein (m. 1992)
- Children: 4
- Parents: Mahn Nyein Maung; Hla Kyi
- Awards: Jonathan Mann Award (1999); Ramon Magsaysay Award (2002); Time's Asian Heroes (2003); Sydney Peace Prize (2013); UNDP's N-Peace Award (2018)

Cynthia Maung (Burmese: စင်သီယာမောင် [sɪ̀ɰ̃θìjà màʊɰ̃]; born 6 December 1959) is a Karen medical doctor and founder of Mae Tao Clinic that has been providing free healthcare services for internally displaced persons (IDP) and migrant workers on the Thai-Burmese border for three decades.

Maung received Southeast Asia's Ramon Magsaysay Award for community leadership and she was listed as one of 2003 Time magazine's Asian Heroes. Altogether she has received six international awards for her work. In 1999, she was the first recipient of the Jonathan Mann Award, sponsored by Swiss and US health organisations.

== Early life and education ==
Cynthia Maung was born to ethnic Karen parents Mahn Nyein Maung and Hla Kyi in Rangoon.

== Awards ==
- 2018 - UNDP's N-Peace Award
- 2018 - Roux Prize
- 2013 - Sydney Peace Prize
- 2012 - National Endowment for Democracy's 2012 Democracy Award
- 2009 - Inspiration Model Award from "Khon Khon Khon", Thai Television Programme
- 2008 - Catalonia International Prize along with Aung San Suu Kyi
- 2007 - Asia Democracy and Human Rights Award (Taiwan Foundation for Democracy)
- 2007 - World's Children's Prize for the Rights of the Child Honorary Award (Children's World Association, Sweden)
- 2005 - Nominated as part of the 1,000 Women Nobel Peace Prize Nomination
- 2005 - Unsung Heroes of Compassion Award from the Dalai Lama and Wisdom in Action
- 2005 - The Eighth Global Concern for Human Life Award
- 2005 - Included in Time's November article on 18 Global Health Heroes
- 2002 - Magsaysay Award for community leadership
- 2001 - Foundation for Human Rights in Asia Special Award
- 2001 - Van Heuven Goedhart Award
- 1999 - Jonathan Mann Health and Human Rights Award
- 1999 - American Women's Medical Association President's Award
- 1999 - John Humphrey Freedom Award

== Family ==
Cynthia Maung has been married to Kyaw Hein since 1992. Together, they have four children, two of whom were adopted.

== Research ==
- "Community-based assessment of human rights in a complex humanitarian emergency: the Emergency Assistance Teams-Burma and Cyclone Nargis" by Voravit Suwanvanichkij, Noriyuki Murakamil, Catherine I Lee, Jen Leigh, Andrea L Wirtz, Brock Daniels, Mahn Mahn, Cynthia Maung and Chris Beyrer: http://www.conflictandhealth.com/content/4/1/8
- "Mobile Obstetrics Project Improves Health of Mothers in Eastern Burma" Mullany et al., (August 2010): http://www.jhsph.edu/publichealthnews/press_releases/2010/mullany_burma_mom_project.html
- "After the Storm: Voices from the Delta" by Voravit Suwanvanichkij, Mahn Mahn, Cynthia Maung, Brock Daniels, Noriyuki Murakami, Andrea Wirtz and Chris Beyrer (February 2009) https://web.archive.org/web/20110429185734/http://www.jhsph.edu/humanrights/locations/asia/BurmaCyclone.html
- "Access To Essential Maternal Health Interventions and Human Rights Violations among Vulnerable Communities in Eastern Burma" by Luke C. Mullany, Catherine I. Lee, Lin Yone, Palae Paw, Eh Kalu Shwe Oo, Cynthia Maung, Thomas J. Lee and Chris Beyrer (December 2008): http://www.burmalibrary.org/docs6/Access_To_Essential_Maternal_Health.pdf
- "Working our Way Back Home: Fertility and Pregnancy Loss on the Thai-Burmese Border" by Cynthia Maung and Suzanne Belton (December 2005) http://www.ibiblio.org/obl/docs3/OurWay.pdf
