= Anantrai Raval =

Indian Gujarati-language critic and editor (1912-1988)

Anantrai Manishankar Raval
- Born: 1 January 1912; Amreli, Bombay Presidency, British India
- Died: 18 November 1988 (aged 76)
- Awards: Ranjitram Suvarna Chandrak (1955); Narmad Suvarna Chandrak (1970–74); Sahitya Akademi Award (1974)

Anantrai Manishankar Raval (1 January 1912 – 18 November 1988) was a Gujarati critic and editor from India. Born and studied in Amreli, he worked briefly with a daily. He taught at several colleges before joining government as a director of language department. He wrote criticism chiefly under the pen name Shaunak and edited several works of Gujarati literature and litterateurs.

== Life ==
Anantrai Raval was born on 1 January 1912 at Amreli in Gujarat. He was a native of Vallabhipur. He completed his primary and secondary education from Amreli. He passed matriculation in 1928. He completed Bachelor of Arts in Gujarati and Sanskrit from Samaldas College, Bhavnagar and was a fellow of same college for two years. He completed Master of Arts with Gujarati and English in 1934 and was the first student in the University of Bombay to pass it with first class. He worked as a subeditor with Hindustan Prajamitra daily for three months. Raval joined Gujarat College in Ahmedabad in August, 1934 and served as a principal of D. K. V. College, Jamnagar for one and half years. He served as Director of Language Department of Government of Gujarat for a decade and retired from the post in 1970. He was later appointed a professor of Gujarati in School of Languages and Literature, Gujarat University. He retired as the president of it in 1977. He served as a member of Law Commission of Government of Gujarat. He presided over the convention of Gujarati Sahitya Parishad at Vadodara in 1979. He died on 18 November 1988.

== Works ==
His chief contributions are in the field of criticism and editing. His pen name was Shaunak.

=== Criticism ===
Sahityavihar (1946) was his first collection of criticism. His other works of criticism are Gandhakshat (1949), Sahityavivek (1958), Sahityanikash (1958), Samiksha (1962), Samalochna (1966), Granthastha Vabgmai (1967), Upchay (1971), Unmilan (1974). Kavivarya Nhanalal (1985) is his study of works of Nanalal Dalpatram Kavi. His Gujarati Sahitya: Madhyakalin is a major work of criticism of medieval literature and litterateurs. Taratamya (1971) is a work of literary criticism. He edited collection of plays of Gujarati playwright, Batubhai Umarvadiya, as Batubhai na Natako (1951).

=== Editing ===
He edited works of many Gujarati litterateurs, Botadkar ni Kavyasarita (1956), Nhanalal no Madhukosh (1959), Nalakhyan (1960), Gujarat no Ekakisangrah (1960), Snehmudra (1960), Madanmohna (1966), Kalapi no Kavyakalap, Chunilal V. Shah ni Shreshtha Vartao. He coedited Buddhiprakash Lekhsangrah, Premanand Bhatt's Chandrahasakhyan, Ramanlal Desai ni Shreshtha Vartao, Kavishri Nhanalal Smarakgranth, Mansukhlal Zaveri ni Kavyasushma, Karsandas Manek ni Akshar Aradhna, Kalelkar Adhyayan Granth, Sarkari Vachanmala 1–4, D.B. Narmadashankar Mehta Samarakgranth. In 1981, he edited Sahityacharcha for Sahitya Akademi. He edited Narsinh Mehta na Pado in 1984. He coedited the fourth volume of Gujarati Sahitya no Itihas (History of Gujarati literature) with Umashankar Joshi, published by Gujarati Sahitya Parishad.

=== Other ===
Raval abridged Ramanlal Desai's Gramlakshmi. He translated novellas of Leo Tolstoy with Vishwanath Bhatt. He also coauthored Aaharvigyan with J. D. Pathak. He wrote some stories for Chaa Ghar (Tea House, 1944).

== Awards ==
Raval received Ranjitram Suvarna Chandrak in 1955. He also received Narmad Suvarna Chandrak in 1974. He was awarded Sahitya Akademi Award for Taratamya in 1974.

== See also ==
- List of Gujarati-language writers
