= WFDA =

WFDA may refer to:

- WFDA-LP, a low-power radio station (99.3 FM) licensed to serve Live Oak, Florida, United States
- World Forum for Democratization in Asia
