= Asian Federation Against Involuntary Disappearances =

Organization based in the Philippines

- Abbreviation: AFAD
- Formation: 4 June 1998; 27 years ago
- Founded at: Manila, Philippines
- Type: Federation of human rights organizations
- Purpose: Involuntary disappearances
- Headquarters: Quezon City, Philippines
- Secretary General: Mary Aileen D. Bacalso
- Chairperson: Khurram Parvez
- Award: Asia Democracy and Human Rights Award (2016)
- Website: disappeared-asia.org

The Asian Federation Against Involuntary Disappearances (AFAD) is an international human rights organization which focuses on the issue of forced disappearance in Asia. AFAD was founded on 4 June 1998 in Manila, Philippines. The federation was awarded the Asia Democracy and Human Rights Award in 2016.

== Members ==
According to the 2018 Annual report of AFAD, 13 organizations and one individual member are part of the federation.

- Advocacy Forum (Nepal)
- Association of Parents of Disappeared Persons (Jammu and Kashmir, India)
- Citizens' Alliance for North Korean Human Rights (South Korea)
- Commission for Missing Persons and Victims of Violence (Indonesia)
- Conflict Victims' Society for Justice (Nepal)
- Defence of Human Rights (Pakistan)
- Families of the Disappeared (Sri Lanka)
- Families of Victims of Involuntary Disappearance (Philippines)
- Free Jonas Burgos Movement (Philippines)
- Association of Families of the Disappeared (Indonesia)
- Justice for Peace Foundation (Thailand)
- Odhikar (Bangladesh)
- Relatives Committee of the May 1992 Heroes (Thailand)
- Ng Shui Meng - Individual member from Laos
