= Parvez Imroz =

Parvez Imroz is a Kashmiri human rights lawyer and a civil rights activist in Srinagar, the summer capital of the Jammu and Kashmir, India.

He is the founder and President of the Jammu and Kashmir Coalition of Civil Society (JKCCS) that works to build local alliances between Kashmiri civil society groups, runs advocacy campaigns, documents rights violations and provides legal assistance to victims. He is also convener of International People's Tribunal on Human Rights and Justice in Indian-administered Kashmir alongside Angana Chatterji, Gautam Navlakha and Zaheer-Ud-Din.

He has filed thousands of habeas corpus actions on behalf of families who claimed their relatives had vanished while in the custody of the Indian security forces. In 2008, along with his team, he first discovered the huge number of mass graves in J&K. Reportedly his group exposed more than 7,000 mass graves in the region over the years, on which no action has yet been taken by the government.

== Awards ==
He was awarded the eleventh Ludovic-Trarieux International Human Rights Prize by Human Rights Institute of The Bar of Bordeaux, Bordeaux, France and the European Bar Human Rights Institute (IDHAE) in 2006, that was first given to Nelson Mandela. In 2017, he was awarded the Thorolf Rafto Memorial Prize for Human Rights along with Parveena Ahanger.

== Jammu and Kashmir Coalition of Civil Society (JKCCS) ==
Jammu and Kashmir Coalition of Civil Society (JKCCS) is a group of organizations and individuals in Jammu and Kashmir whose main focus of area is human rights in Jammu and Kashmir. It was founded on 20 June 2000. The society consists of individuals like Parvez Imroz (founder and President) and Khurram Parvez, and organisations like Association of Parents of Disappeared Persons (APDP), Public Commission on Human Rights (PCHR) and the International Peoples’ Tribunal on Human Rights and Justice in Kashmir (IPTK).

Jammu and Kashmir Coalition of Civil Society is a regular opinion leader and their statements are featured in various articles related to issues in Jammu and Kashmir. JKCCS also comes out with various reports, and conducts documentation and legal proceedings related to human rights issues in Jammu and Kashmir.

Members of JKCCS have won various domestic and international awards for human rights work done in Jammu and Kashmir such as Khurram Parvez who won the Reebok Human Rights Award in 2006, and other members of JKCCS are well known human rights defenders such as Natasha Rather, a Front Line Defender, who also co-authored the book 'Do You Remember Kunan Poshpora?'.

The organization was awarded the 23rd Tji Hak-soon Justice and Peace Prize for work on protection of human rights and promoting justice and peace.

== See also ==
- Human rights abuses in Jammu and Kashmir
- Kashmir conflict
