= Irfan Mehraj =

Indian journalist and Human rights activist

- Born: Kashmir, India
- Education: M.A (Mass communication)
- Alma mater: University of Kashmir
- Occupations: Journalist and Human rights defender
- Awards: Human Rights and Religious Freedom Journalism Award (2024)

Irfan Mehraj is a journalist and human rights activist from Kashmir. He works with Deutsche Welle and also writes for various publications like The Indian Express, TRT World, The Wire, The Caravan, Himal Southasian and NewArab. Irfan has specially written about the challenges facing the Muslim community in Kashmir. He was the Editor of Two Circles and the founding editor of Wande Magazine.

== Early life ==
Mehraj was born in Kashmir, India. Mehraj successfully obtained his master's degree in mass communication and journalism from the esteemed University of Kashmir.

== Detention ==
On 20 March 2023, Mehraj was arrested by the National Investigation Agency (NIA) in Srinagar after being summoned for questioning. Mehraj's arrest was part of an ongoing investigation into alleged terror funding linked to non-governmental organizations (NGOs) in Kashmir. The NIA accused him of being involved with the Jammu Kashmir Coalition of Civil Society (JKCCS), a prominent human rights organization that has documented Human Rights violations in the region. The NIA has alleged that JKCCS was involved in funding terrorist activities in the Kashmir Valley and accused the organization of promoting a "secessionist agenda" under the guise of human rights work. Mehraj was associated with the JKCCS, and its leader, Khurram Parvez, had also been arrested earlier in a related case.

=== Reactions ===
Mehraj's arrest drew criticism from various international human rights organizations. Amnesty International and twelve other civil society organizations wrote a joint statement calling for the immediate and unconditional release of Mehraj. They asserted that the arrest was part of a "growing crackdown" on journalists and human rights defenders in Indian-administered Kashmir. The UN Special Rapporteur on Human Rights Defenders and other UN experts wrote to the Indian government, raising concerns over the legitimacy of Mehraj’s arrest and expressed fears that it was part of a strategy to delegitimize the human rights work of JKCCS and obstruct independent monitoring of the situation in Jammu and Kashmir. Mary Lawlor, UN special rapporteur on the situation of human rights defenders, called for his release and the closing of the cases against Kashmiri human rights defenders.

Mehbooba Mufti the leader of the PDP, also voiced her disapproval of Mehraj's arrest. In a Facebook post, PDP president Mehbooba Mufti criticized the arrest, stating that in Kashmir, criminals are allowed to roam freely while journalists like Irfan Mehraj, who are simply doing their duty by speaking the truth, are unjustly detained. The Press Club of India (PCI) also condemned Mehraj's arrest, emphasizing their strong opposition to the imposition of UAPA on media personnel. They expressed concern over the NIA's sudden arrest of Mehraj under the UAPA law, viewing it as a clear indication of the law's misuse to suppress freedom of speech and expression and demanded his immediate release.

== Awards ==
- Human Rights and Religious Freedom Journalism Award for 2024.
