= Vishwanath Bhatt =

Indian critic and lexicographer (1898–1968)

- Born: 20 March 1898; Umarala, Bhavnagar State, British India
- Died: 27 November 1968 (aged 70)
- Occupations: Literary critic, lexicographer

Vishwanath Maganlal Bhatt (20 March 1898 – 27 November 1968) was a Gujarati literary critic and lexicographer from Gujarat, India. He had published 22 works. He was awarded the Ranjitram Suvarna Chandrak in 1935.

== Biography ==
Bhatt was born on 20 March 1898 in Umarala, Bhavnagar State of British India. He completed his matriculation in 1916 and graduated in 1920 with Sanskrit and English as his major subjects. He wanted to study post graduation but under the influence of Mahatma Gandhi's Non-cooperation Movement. He left the studies to join the movement. He married Savitri.

Bhatt worked as a teacher in various schools at Umreth, Bharuch, and Ahmedabad during 1920–26. Later he joined the Gujarat Vidyapith as part of a team working on the Gujarati spelling dictionary, Jodani Kosh. Next year, he moved to Gondal to work on Bhagavadgomandal. He again worked as a teacher during 1930–39. He also worked as a professor of Gujarati at S.L.U. College for Women and L. D. Arts College during 1944–45 and 1947–48 respectively.

He died on 27 November 1968.

== Works ==
Bhatt is known for his contribution to the field of criticism in Gujarati literature. He was a critic of the Romantic School. His works were favorably inclined to the Western literary theory and criticism. He believed that a critic is superior to the writer. A literary controversy between Vishwanath Bhatt and Ramnarayan Pathak about Criticism is Creation had attracted wide attention in those years. The three well known critics of Gujarati literature are popularly known as three V's of Gujarati literature – Vishnuprasad Trivedi, Vijayray Vaidya and Vishwanath Bhatt.

He had published 22 books.

=== Criticism ===
His works include:

- Sahitya Samiksha (1937)
- Vivechan Mukur (1939)
- Nikash Rekha (1945)
- Pooja Ane Pariksha (1962)
- Sitara-shiksha (1967)

He is known for analyzing the art of critic and make its value known in the Gujarati literary sphere. He was of the opinion that, beyond analyzing, critiquing is art with creativity. He pressed these thoughts with few takers.

His articles Sausthavapriya Ane Kautukpriya, Shil ane Sahitya etc. discuss the principles of critiquing. He has written articles analyzing creations of Dalpatram, Ramanlal Desai, and Jhaverchand Meghani. Under his articles Pandityugnu Mahakavya, Rastarangini ane Narmadnu Kavya Mandir, he has critiqued the writings of Govardhanram Tripathi, Damodar Botadkar and Narmad.

Sahityano Swadhyay - Purvardh (1963) is his book explaining principles in literature based on An Introduction to the Study of literature by William Henry Hudson. The second half of the book was not published.

Edited works

His edited works are:

- Gadya Navneet (1926)
- Narmadnu Mandir - Gadyavibhag (1928)
- Paribhashik Shabdakosh (1930–32)
- Narmadnu Mandir - Padyavibhag (1938)
- Nibandhmala (1940)

Biography

- Veer Narmad (1933)

Translations

He translated novellas of Leo Tolstoy with Anantrai Raval.

- Avum Kem Sujhyu? (1928)
- Premno Dambh (1930)
- Kathavali 1-2 (1932, 1935)
- Navo Avatar 1-2-3 (1932, 1933, 1934)
- Lagnasukh (1936)

== Recognition ==
Bhatt was awarded the Ranjitram Suvarna Chandrak in 1935.

== See also ==
- List of Gujarati-language writers
