= Mihir Desai =

Indian human rights lawyer

- Occupation: Lawyer
- Known for: Human rights activism

Mihir Desai is an Indian human rights lawyer in cases of mass murders and riots, fake encounter and custodial deaths by the police, police brutality, freedom of speech and journalists, political activists and prisoners of conscience, excesses by the state, mass disappearances and deaths and genocide probes. A senior counsel, he has been practicing criminal matters in Bombay High Court, Mumbai and the Supreme Court of India.

== Family ==
Mihir Desai is the son of Neera Desai, a women's rights advocate in India, and Dr. A.R. Desai, one of India's pioneering Marxian sociologists.

== Career ==
Desai is the son of Neera Desai, (1925-2009), a leading advocate of women's rights from a middle-class Gujarati family. As a child he traveled with his mother to Rome and the United States, where she had a one-year teaching assignment. His uncle ran a firm of solicitors. Desai is a co-founder of the Indian People's Tribunal (IPT) and the Human Rights Law Network, and is a former director of the India Center for Human Rights and Law. He was co-founder with lawyer Colin Gonsalves of the human rights magazine Combat Law. Desai addresses subjects that include illegal acts by the authorities, police brutality and sexual assault. He has assisted survivors of the 2002 Gujarat massacre. He was co-editor of the book Women and Law (1999). He is an invited member of the India Regional Team of the "Promoting Pluralism Knowledge Programme".

== Sample cases ==
In 2003 Desai was assisting the Asian Human Rights Commission in their fight on behalf of Adivasi people to remain on land claimed by the Maharashtra State Farming Corporation. Desai was co-convenor with Angana P. Chatterji of an IPT team that investigated communal violence in Orissa over a 20-month period in 2005/2006 and co-editor of the report that presented the findings. Desai was legal counsel to the International People's Tribunal on Human Rights and Justice in Kashmir, and co-signatory to a February 2009 letter to Omar Abdullah, Chief Minister of Jammu and Kashmir, that requested action to address the abuses the tribunal had found.

In April 2012, Mihir Desai represented the mother of a 2002 bomb blast suspect, who had died in custody. He was also involved in the legal proceedings against the Gangster Sukha Kahlon and his co-conspirators Anand Dutta from Amritsar and Preet Phagwara from Chandigarh. Sukha was charged in 8 murder cases. The accused were sentenced to 4 years of imprisonment for their crimes, under the clauses of The Arms act(1959), The Prevention of Money Laundering act(PMLA),2002 and on charges of IPC Section 300/302 (Culpable Homicide amounting to Murder), IPC Section 363 (Kidnapping) among other crimes. The accused were later acquitted in the case.

Four police officers had been charged, and the government was to recover the money from these officers. The government refused a plea to prosecute ten other officers who had allegedly been involved.

== Arrest ==
On 4 February 2020, Mihir Desai was arrested along with 16 persons for alleged unlawful assembly in connection with the protest at the Gateway of India against the violence at Jawaharlal Nehru University. All of them were released on bail on personal bonds.

== Bibliography ==
- Christine Chorine, Mihir Desai, Colin Gonsalves (1999). Women and the Law, Volume 2. Bombay: Socio-Legal Information Centre.
- Colin Gonsalves; Mihir Desai; Jane Cox. Leading Cases on Prisoner's Rights. Bombay: Legal Resource Centre, Yuva-Youth for Unity and Voluntary Action. p. 262.
- Angana P. Chatterji, Mihir Desai (2006). Communalism in Orissa: Report of the Indian People's Tribunal on Environment and Human Rights. Indian People's Tribunal on Environment and Human Rights. ISBN 818947913X.
