= Sinor, Gujarat =

Sinor શિનોર
- Town
- Location in Gujarat, India
- Coordinates: 22.00°N 73.30°E
- Country: India
- State: Gujarat
- District: Vadodara

Government
  - Body: Municipality

Population (2010)
  - Total: 11,267

Languages
  - Official: Gujarati, Hindi, English
- Time zone: UTC+5:30 (IST)
- PIN: 391115
- Telephone code: +91-02666
- Vehicle registration: GJ-06

Sinor, also called Shinor (formerly Senapur/Sainyapur), is a small town in Vadodara District, Gujarat, India. Situated on the banks of River Narmada, it is known as the birthplace of one of the most prolific Gujarati writers, Ramanlal Vasantlal Desai. It is also believed that Sayajirao Gayakwad visited Sinor and met Shree Lallubhai Zaverbhai Patel of Bhekhada Village. Natives in this village speak Gujarati as their first language.

People living here are mostly from Hindu and Muslim communities and there is also presence of Jain communities. Village is physically divided in various small areas called "Faliyas" in local language. The main Faliyas include Busa Faliya, Dev faliya, Ranavas, Ramji mandir, Adhibagh, Charbagh, Nani Bhagol, Timba Faliya, Rabarivad, Nagarwada, Popat Sheri, Machhivad and Bhatt Sheri.

The town is also famous for its bands, which are mostly active in local ceremonies as well as in ceremonies held in nearby villages. The bands include Shamshad Band, Bashir Band, Makbul Nizami Band, Hindustan Band, and Master Kalu Band. The town is also known for Kotha, a sour fruit similar to a fig.

There are many temples on the bank of Narmada river, some of them are Ramji Mandir (Ganesh Mandir), Bhandareshvar Temple, Sai Baba Temple, Hanumanji Temple, Rohineshvar Temple, and Krashneshvar Temple. It is also near Angareshwar Mahadev temple at Malsar. There are many old and historical Derasar in the town as well. Another newly constructed beautiful Derasar sits on the bank of river Narmada. Two old historical bridges also present here, which are said to be constructed under the guidance of Sayajirao Gaekwad III the former King of Vadodara and it is known as "Jhulto Pool" which means swinging bridge.

A narrow-gauge railway line connects Sinor with Karjan (NH8) and proceeds from there to Dabhoi.

The town is quoted as the birthplace of the main character in a fiction titled Sita's Curse by Sreemoyee Piu Kundu.

Currently, Malsar-Asha bridge is under construction at Malsar near Sinor.
