= Do You Remember Kunan Poshpora? =

2016 book

- First edition
- Authors: Essar Batool, Ifrah Butt, Munaza Rashid, Natasha Rather and Samreena Mushtaq
- Language: English
- Publisher: Zubaan Books
- Pages: 228
- ISBN: 978-93-84757-66-3

Do You Remember Kunan Poshpora? is a 2016 non-fiction book authored by five Kashmiri women: Essar Batool, Ifrah Butt, Munaza Rashid, Natasha Rather and Samreena Mushtaq. The book concerns the alleged 1991 mass rape by Indian security forces and is part of a series on "Sexual Violence and Impunity in South Asia" published by Zubaan Books and supported by the International Development Research Centre. The book was officially released at the Jaipur Literature Festival.

Inspired by the public reaction to the Nirbhaya gang rape in December 2012, the five Kashmiri authors chronicle the night of 23/24 February 1991 in Kupwara district in the neighboring villages of Kunan and Poshpora, where the 68th Mountain Brigade of the 4th Rajputana Rifle killed several male members and allegedly raped a number of women. The Kunan Poshpora incident is the second time the Indian Army has been accused of "mass sexual violence", the first one is the mass rape accusation on Indian Army's IPKF against Tamil girls in Sri lanka ( Indian Army faces rape allegations in North Eastern States) The authors themselves lobbied the government to reopen the investigation of the incident, which was done in 2013.

== Description ==
The book is divided into seven chapters. The first chapter is about the overall role that women have played in the resistance movement in Kashmir. This is followed by each of the authors penning down what they personally remember of the incident. The next two chapters lay out the background of what was happening in Kashmir at the time. Here the authors analyze a police case diary, statements to the State Human Rights Commission and the interviews of the authors with those in the village. The book is the first extensive interaction with the alleged victims. The fourth chapter portrays the lives of the two villages today. The fifth chapter covers the official information on the case where the authors criticize the Verghese report by the Press Council of India team which had concluded that the incident was a hoax. The sixth chapter goes on to reconstruct the events of that night through first person interviews. The seventh and last chapter of the book narrates the struggle by the survivors and authors to get justice including a public interest litigation in 2013.

February 23 is now known as ‘Kashmiri Women’s Resistance Day’.

== Critical reception ==
The book has been seen as the ability of Kashmiri women to tell their own story, lead the discourse, and show resistance. The new information, the interviews with the people of Kunan and Poshpora, as well as the case diary which the authors have brought into the public domain also add to the value of the book.

The authors faced numerous hurdles in conducting a book launch. A seminar in Ambedkar University in which one of the authors was due to speak was cancelled for fear of violence.

== See also ==
- 41 biranganas
- Rape during the Kashmir conflict

== Bibliography ==
- Batool, Essar; Butt, Ifrah; Rashid, Munaza; Rather, Natasha; Mushtaq, Samreena (2016). Do You Remember Kunan Poshpora?. New Delhi: Zubaan Books. ISBN 9789384757847.
