= Akshay Ramanlal Desai =

Indian sociologist (1915–1994)

- Born: 26 April 1915; Nadiad, British India
- Died: 12 November 1994 (aged 79); Vadodara, Gujarat, India
- Education: University of Mumbai (MA, LLB, PhD)
- Employers: University of Mumbai; Indian Sociological Society
- Spouse: Neera lblDesai (m. 1947)
- Children: Mihir Desai
- Parent: Ramanlal Desai (father)
- Awards: Pandit Jawaharlal Nehru Award for Social Sciences (1987); Best Sociologist of the Year (1987) by UGC

Akshay Ramanlal Desai (26 April 1915 – 12 November 1994) was an Indian sociologist, Marxist and a social activist. He was Professor and Head of the Department of Sociology in University of Bombay in 1967. He is particularly known for his work Social Background of Indian Nationalism in which he offered a Marxist analysis of the genesis of Indian nationalism making use of history, which set a path to build socialism in India.

== Biography ==
Desai was born in Nadiad (now in Gujarat). His father Ramanlal Desai was a Gujarati writer, novelist and civil servant of the Baroda State who inspired him to study and explore facts of human society. While still a teenager, Desai took part in the student movements in Surat, Baroda and Bombay. He was active in farmers' and labor movements and became the editor of bulletins and newspapers of the All India Kisan Sabha (1932–1937). As a political activist, he joined the Communist Party of India (1934) and Trotskyist Revolutionary Socialist Party (1953–1981). He graduated in Political Science and Economics from the University of Bombay in 1935 and obtained a law degree and PhD under the guidance of G. S. Ghurye in 1946. In the same year, he joined as a college lecturer in sociology after briefly practicing as a lawyer to help those in movements. In 1951 he joined as a faculty member in the Department of Sociology, University of Bombay, where he taught sociology and guided researchers till his retirement in 1976. He was Senior Fellow (1973–74) and National Fellow (1981–85) of the Indian Council of Social Science Research (ICSSR). He authored several books in English and Gujarati which are translated into other languages. He wrote pamphlets and booklets in regional languages for common people in addition to books and pamphlets for those in academia. He was president, Gujarat Sociological Society (1988–1990) and was President of the 15th All India Sociological Conference held at Meerut in 1980. From 1980 to 1981, he was President of the Indian Sociological Society.

He married Neera Desai in 1947, and they had a son, Mihir Desai, presently a human rights lawyer and an advocate in the Supreme Court of India.

== Work and views ==
In his attempt to understand Indian society from a Marxian perspective, he consistently applied Marxist methods in his treatment of Indian social structure and processes and adopted a dialectical historical approach for his sociological studies on nationalism, examination of Community Development programmes, urban slums and their demographic problems, peasant movements and interface between state and society. He edited, compiled and authored many volumes on rural sociology, urbanization, labour movements, peasant struggles, modernization, religion, democratic rights and political sociology. His study of the bourgeois class character and inherent contradiction of the Indian National Movement is noteworthy and his edited volume on Rural Sociology showed how change and development was taking place in Indian rural society. While focusing on the relevance of the Marxist approach for Indian society in his presidential address of AISC, he gave notice to the mainstream that Marxism indeed had a place in Sociology and accordingly created a forum for scholars in University of Bombay to broaden their horizons of research. He was one of the concerned members of the Human Rights Commission which selected a tribunal to investigate cases of human rights violations by the state and also extended support to groups seeking justice through demonstrations, meetings and workshops.

== Selected publications ==
=== Books ===
- Desai A.R. (2019) Social Background of Indian Nationalism, Popular Prakashan, Bombay (first published 1948) ISBN 9386042258
- Desai A.R. (2005) Rural India in Transition, Popular Prakshan, Bombay ISBN 9788171540167
- Desai A.R. (1984) India's Path of Development – A Marxist approach. Popular Prakashan, Bombay ISBN 9780861320646
- Desai A.R. Wilfred De'costa (1994) State and Repressive Culture-a case study of Gujrath, South Asia Books ISBN 8171547028
- Desai A.R. (1990) A Profile of an Indian Slum. ISBN 978-1125131183 OCLC 810925
- Desai A.R. (1986) Agrarian Struggles in India after Independence, Oxford University Press ISBN 978-0195616811
- Desai A.R., Uday Mehta (1993) Modern God men in India- A Sociological Appraisal, Bombay Popular Prakashan ISBN 8171547087 ISBN 9788171547081
- Desai A.R. (1960) Recent Trends in Indian Nationalism:supplement to social background of Indian Nationalism. Popular Prakashan ISBN 8171540422
- Desai A.R. (1990) Changing profile of rural India and human rights of the agrarian poor – an assessment of strategy of rural development since independence OCLC 831288893
- Desai A.R. (2008) State and Society in India -Essays in Dissent ASIN B073WYLW4F (First published 1975)
- Desai A.R. (1980) Urban Family and Family Planning in India. ISBN 0940500701 ISBN 978-0940500709
- Desai A. R. Sunil Dighe (1988) – Labor Movement in India – (1928–1930) vol.9, 10, 11 ISBN 8173070881
- Desai A. R., Punekar, Vericayill, Savur, Dighe, Ganesh Labor Movement in India vol 5 (1923–27) – Indian Council of Historical Research ISBN 8173070954

=== Edited volumes ===
- (1994) Rural Sociology in India (first published 1959), Popular Prakashan ISBN 8171541542 ISBN 978-8171541546
- (1986) Violation of Democratic Rights in India vol. 1, Popular Prakashan Bombay ISBN 0861321308 ISBN 978-0861321308
- (1990) Repression and Resistance in India-violation of democratic rights of the working class, rural poor, adivasis and dalits, Popular Prakashan ISBN 0861322258
- (1991) Expanding Governmental Lawlessness and Organized Struggles, Popular Prakashan. ISBN 8171545297 ISBN 978-8171545292
- (1976) Essays in Modernization of Underdeveloped Societies, Humanities Press OCLC 6247475

=== Selected journal articles ===
- Desai, A.R. (September 1958). "Community Development Projects—A Sociological Analysis". Sociological Bulletin. 7 (2). Indian Sociological Society: 152–166. doi:10.1177/0038022919580208. JSTOR 42864541. S2CID 151893931.
- Desai, A.R. (March 1956). "Rural Sociology : Its Need in India". Sociological Bulletin. 5 (1): 9–28. doi:10.1177/0038022919560102. S2CID 157222175.
- Desai, A.R. (March 1981). "Relevance of the Marxist Approach to the study of Indian Society". Sociological Bulletin. 30 (1): 1–20. doi:10.1177/0038022919810101. S2CID 152086186.
- Desai, A.R. (September 1960). "Urbanization and Social Stratification". Sociological Bulletin. 9 (2). Indian Sociological Society: 7–14. doi:10.1177/0038022919600202. JSTOR 42864567. S2CID 157378463.
- Desai, A.R. (March 1963). "National Integration and Religion". Sociological Bulletin. 12 (1): 53–65. doi:10.1177/0038022919630106. S2CID 152166119.
