= Advocacy Forum =

Nepalese non-governmental organization

Advocacy Forum (AF) is a non-profit, non-governmental organization working to promote the rule of law and uphold international human rights standards in Nepal. The organization is part of the Asian Federation Against Involuntary Disappearances.
