= Angana P. Chatterji =

Indian anthropologist, activist, and feminist historian

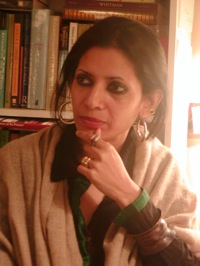
- Born: November 1966 (age 59–60); Calcutta, India
- Citizenship: Indian
- Education: CIIS, San Francisco
- Notable work: Violent Gods, Buried Evidence
- Partner: Richard Shapiro
- Website: anganachatterji.net

Angana P. Chatterji (born November 1966) is an Indian anthropologist, activist, and feminist historian, whose research is closely related to her advocacy work and focuses mainly on India. She co-founded the International People's Tribunal on Human Rights and Justice in Kashmir and was a co-convener from April 2008 to December 2012.

She is currently a research scholar at the Centre for Race and Gender at the University of California at Berkeley.

== Personal life ==
Angana Chatterji is the daughter of Bhola Chatterji (1922–1992), a socialist and Indian freedom fighter and Anubha Sengupta Chatterji. She is the great-great-granddaughter of Gooroodas Banerjee, a judge and the first Indian Vice-Chancellor of the University of Calcutta. She grew up in the communally-tense neighborhood of Narkeldanga and Rajabazar in Kolkata. Her family included intercaste parents and grandparents, and aunts who were Muslim and Catholic.

Chatterji moved from Kolkata to Delhi in 1984, and then to the United States in the 1990s. She retains her Indian citizenship but is a permanent resident of the United States. Her formal education comprises a BA and an MA in Political Science. She also holds a PhD in the Humanities from California Institute of Integral Studies (CIIS), where she later taught anthropology. The topic of her dissertation (completed in 1999) was "The Politics of Sustainable Ecology: Initiatives, Conflicts, Alliances in Public Lands Access, Use and Reform in Orissa."

== Career ==
From her graduation until 1997, Chatterji worked as director of research at the Asia Forest Network, an environmental advocacy group. During this period, she also worked with the Indian Institute of Public Administration, the Indian Social Institute, and the Planning Commission of India.

Chatterji joined the teaching staff of the California Institute of Integral Studies (CIIS) in 1997, and taught Social and Cultural Anthropology there. Her social and academic advocacy work was related to anthropology, as she was examining issues of class, gender, race, religion, and sexuality as formed by background (history) and place (geography). At CIIS, she worked with her colleague and partner, Richard Shapiro, to create a new academic center focused on postcolonial anthropology.

Chatterji's publications include research monographs, reports and books. In 1990, she co-published a report on immigrant women's rights in Delhi's slums and resettlement colonies. In 1996, based on participatory research on indigenous and Dalit land rights issues and on caste inequities, she self-published a monograph Community Forest Management in Arabari: Understanding Socioeconomic and Subsistence Issues. In 2004, she co-edited with Lubna Nazir Chaudhury a special issue of Cultural Dynamics, entitled "Gendered Violence in South Asia: Nation and Community in The Postcolonial Present" In 2005, she co-edited a book with Shabnam Hashmi entitled Dark Leaves of the Present which was non-scholarly and intended for the general public. In March 2009, after six and a half years of collaborative and theoretical research, she produced a study on Hindu nationalism entitled Violent Gods: Hindu Nationalism in India's Present; Narratives from Orissa, published by Three Essays Collective, which received favourable reviews in popular periodicals, and has been reviewed by American Ethnologist.

She has co-contributed to an anthology with Tariq Ali, Arundhati Roy et al., Kashmir: The Case for Freedom (2011) and to South Asian Feminisms (2012), co-edited by Ania Loomba and Ritty A. Lukose. She is co-editor of Contesting Nation: Gendered Violence in South Asia; Notes on the Postcolonial Present (2013) and is working on a forthcoming title: Land and Justice: The Struggle for Cultural Survival.

In 2002, Chatterji worked with the Campaign to Stop Funding Hate in the production of a report on the funding of Sangh Parivar service organizations in India by the Maryland-based India Development and Relief Fund.

In 2005, she helped form and worked with the Coalition Against Genocide in the United States to raise public awareness and protest the visit of Gujarat Chief Minister Narendra Modi to the U.S. as an honored guest.

In 2005, she co-convened a People's Tribunal to record testimonials on the experiences and concerns of different strata of people on the rise of the Hindu nationalist Sangh Parivar in Orissa. In this, Chatterji worked with Indian People's Tribunal on Environment and Human Rights, with Mihir Desai, Retired Chief Justice K.K. Usha of Kerala, Sudhir Pattnaik, Ram Puniyani, Colin Gonsalves and others. As the People's Tribunal on Communalism in Orissa was ongoing in June 2005, Sangh members disrupted the Tribunal's proceedings, threatening to rape and parade the women members of the Tribunal. The Tribunal released a detailed report in October 2006, warning of future violence.

After the outbreak of violence between the Hindu and Christian groups in December 2007, Chatterji testified to the Panigrahi Commission against the Sangh Parivar groups, and warned of further violence. She wrote articles criticizing the Hindutva groups, when fresh religious violence broke out in Orissa after the murder of Swami Lakshmanananda in August 2008.

Chatterji was lead author of a 2009 report titled Buried Evidence: Unknown, Unmarked, and Mass Graves in Indian-administered Kashmir, detailing 2,700 unknown, unmarked, and mass graves across three districts and 55 villages. The findings of the report would be verified by the united nation Human Rights Commission in 2011.

On 30 August 2010, Chatterji was announced as a member of advisory board of the Kashmir Initiative at the Carr Center for Human Rights Policy of Harvard Kennedy School.

In October 2019, Chatterji testified before the U.S. Congressional Committee on Foreign Affairs on human rights violations in Indian-administered Kashmir.

In November 2010, Chatterji's husband, Richard Shapiro, was denied entry to India by immigration authorities at the Delhi airport, and was forced to return to the United States. Though no official reason was given to Shapiro for the denial of entry, many suspect that he had been denied due to Chatterji's work on human rights issues in Kashmir.

Chatterji and Shapiro were suspended in July 2011 and dismissed in December 2011 after 14 and 25 years of service respectively, after the CIIS received student complaints against them. The CIIS Faculty Hearing Board found them guilty of failure to perform academic duties and violation of professional ethics. The Chronicle of Higher Education reported that Chatterji (along with Shapiro) had been fired for having “breached student confidence, falsified grades, misapplied funds, and otherwise engaged inunprofessional conduct, generally to ensure the loyalty and obedience of those they taught and advised.” However, according to India Abroad, 39 Anthropology students from a Department of 50 retained legal counsel to take action against CIIS. The Chronicle of Higher Education also reported allegations by a student, who had been supportive of Shapiro and Chatterji, of being pressured to say negative things about the two professors." All accusations against Chatterji and Shapiro were dropped by CIIS in early 2013 as part of an arbitration agreement, with the school paying toward their legal fees.

== Recent publications ==
In October 2011, Verso Books published the book Kashmir: The Case for Freedom, of which Chatterji is a contributing author.

She is co-editor of Contesting Nation: Gendered Violence in South Asia; Notes on the Postcolonial Present (Zubaan Books), released in April 2013.

In 2012, she and Shashi Buluswar co-founded the Armed Conflict Resolution and People's Rights Project, housed at the University of California, Berkeley. The Project co-authored its first research report in 2015, "Access to Justice for Women: India’s Response to Sexual Violence in Conflict and Mass Social Unrest" with the Human Rights Law Clinic at Boalt Law School. In the same year, it also published a monograph, Conflicted Democracies and Gendered Violence: The Right to Heal. The monograph included a statement by former UN High Commissioner for Human Rights Navi Pillay and a foreword by Veena Das.

Chatterji co-edited, with Thomas Blom Hansen and Christophe Jaffrelot, the 2019 book Majoritarian State: How Hindu Nationalism is Changing India, in which contributors discussed how Hindu nationalism has influenced Indian government bodies and social sectors since 2014.

In September 2021, Chatterji authored BREAKING WORLDS: Religion, Law and Citizenship in Majoritarian India The Story of Assam in collaboration with Mihir Desai, Harsh Mander, and Abdul Kalam Azad, on the "weaponization" of citizenship laws and policies to erode or remove the citizenship rights of certain minorities, especially those of Bengali Muslims.
