= Neera Desai =

Professor and social worker

- Neera Desai
- Born: 1925
- Died: 25 June 2009 (aged 84); Mumbai, India
- Occupation: Academic
- Known for: Women's Studies frontrunner, academician, social activist.
- Spouse: Akshay Ramanlal Desai (m. 1947)
- Children: Mihir Desai

Academic background
- Thesis: Gujarati Society in Nineteenth Century: an Analysis of Social Change (1965)
- Doctoral advisor: I. P. Desai

Neera Desai (1925 — 25 June 2009) was one of the leaders of Women's Studies in India and was noted for her contributions as a professor, researcher, academician, political activist, and social worker. She founded the first of its kind Research Centre for Women's Studies and the Centre for Rural Development in 1974. She joined the SNDT Women's University in 1954 and was a part of various governing bodies as a professor and the Head of Department of Sociology (post-graduate).

== Early life and education ==
Desai was born in 1925 to a Gujarati family that was involved in and supported the Indian Independence Movement. Desai herself joined the freedom movement at an early age as a schoolgirl when she became a part of the Vanar Sena (Monkey Brigade), founded by Indira Gandhi which helped the underground circulation of political messages and banned publications. Neera did her primary education at the Fellowship School, a co-educational institution which was founded on Theosophist ideology. She joined Elphinstone College in 1942, but soon gave up formal education to take part in the freedom movement after Mahatma Gandhi's initiation of the Quit India Resolution. Neera married Akshay Ramanlal Desai, a fellow sociologist, in 1947. Eventually completing her studies, Desai concluded her postgraduate studies shortly post Indian independence. Her M.A. thesis focused on Women in Modern India (analysis of women in the Bhakti Movement), which was later published in 1957.

== Professional timeline ==
Desai's professional works focused on improving gender studies, bringing in practical experience into academic life through many policy recommendations, harboring and propagating an understanding the links of the civil society and educational curriculum. Listed below is short and by no way complete timeline of some of the positions she held during her career.

- 1954 – Joined SNDT
- 1965 – Completed her PhD in Sociology
- 1972 – Appointed as a member of the Social Task Force of the Committee on the Status of Women in India
- 1975 – Founded the Research Unit for Women's Studies
- 1982 – Was one of the founding members of Indian Association for Women's Studies (IAWS)
- 1987 – Became a member of the National Commission on Self Employed Women and Women in the Informal Sector
- 1988 – Became one of the founding members of SPARROW (Sound and Picture Archives for Research on Women)

== Notable works ==
Desai has written in both English and Gujarati at the intersection of sociology, history, and women's studies. Her books include:

- Neera Desai, Woman in Modern India (1957; repr. Bombay: Vora & Co, 1977)
- Neera Desai, The Making of a Feminist, Indian Journal of Gender Studies 2 (1995)
- Neera Desai, Traversing through Gendered Spaces: Insights from Women's Narratives, in Sujata Patel and Krishna Raj (eds), Thinking Social Science in India: Essays in Honour of Alice Thorner (New Delhi: Sage, 2002). Another version was published in Gujarati in 1997.
- N. Desai and S. Gogate, Teaching of Sociology through the Regional Language
- Neera Desai, Women and the Bhakti Movement, in Kumkum Sangari and Sudesh Vaid (eds), Women and Culture (Bombay: Research Centre for Women's Studies, SNDT Women's University, 1994).

== Death ==
Desai died on 25 June 2009 in Mumbai.
