= Parveena Ahanger =

Kashmiri activist

Parveena Ahangar
- Born: Srinagar, Kashmir, India
- Other name: Iron Lady of Kashmir
- Occupations: Chairperson, Association of Parents of Disappeared Persons (APDP)
- Known for: Rafto Prize for Human Right 2017
- Website: https://www.apdpkashmir.com

Parveena Ahangar (born in Srinagar, Jammu and Kashmir) is the Founder and Chairperson of Association of Parents of Disappeared Persons (APDP) in Jammu and Kashmir.

Parveena Ahangar, was nominated for Nobel Peace Prize 2005 . She won the Rafto Prize for Human Rights in 2017 for her “protests against enforced disappearances” and for demanding justice for victims of violence in Jammu and Kashmir. She was named as one of the BBC 100 Women, a list of 100 inspiring and influential women from around the world for 2019.

Parveena is referred to as the 'Iron lady of Kashmir'. She was nominated by the Indian media Channel CNN IBN for an award which she rejected on account of the deceitful approach by Indian media over the pain and tragedies of Kashmiris.

== Association of Parents of Disappeared Persons ==
Parveena started the "Association of Parents of Disappeared Persons" in 1994 to provide support and mobilize family members of missing persons due to enforced disappearances and to put pressure on India's government to investigate the estimated 8-10,000 cases of involuntary disappearances in Kashmir. The organization is part of the Asian Federation Against Involuntary Disappearances.

Parveena Ahanger, co-founder and chairman of the Association of Parents of Disappeared Persons, has represented APDP’s cause in the Philippines (2000), Thailand (2003), Indonesia (2005), Chiang Mai (2006), Geneva (2008), Cambodia (2009) and London (2014).

== Lecture at the University of Westminster ==
Ahanger spoke at London's University of Westminster in 2014.
