= International People's Tribunal on Human Rights and Justice in Kashmir =

- Founded: 2008
- Purpose: Investigation of Human right abuses in Jammu and Kashmir
- Region served: Jammu and Kashmir
- Key people: Parvez Imroz, Angana P. Chatterji, Gautam Navlakha and Zaheer-Ud-Din
- Website: www.kashmirprocess.org

International People's Tribunal on Human Rights and Justice in Kashmir (IPTK) is a People's Tribunal formed by Indian human rights activists for the purpose of probing human right violations in the Indian-administered territory of Jammu and Kashmir, and bridging the gap between people living in Kashmir and rest of India. It was first convened in 2008 by Parvez Imroz, Angana P. Chatterji, Gautam Navlakha and Zaheer-Ud-Din. Chatterji served as convener until December 2012.

== Background ==
The Tribunal was first envisioned in 2006 when Parvez Imroz, a human rights activist, invited Angana Chatterji to Kashmir. From 2006–2008, Chatterji studied the Kashmir issue and interviewed the locals. Mallika Kaur, a scholar of Harvard Kennedy School, while explaining the need of the Tribunal, said that there was no such mechanism for investigating the human right abuses in this hypermilitarized region.

The Tribunal's mandate does not include finding political solutions to resolve the Kashmir issue. Instead it includes recording and investigating crimes committed only in the part of Kashmir administered by India. According to Mallika Kaur the Tribunal did not include the Pakistani-administered Kashmir because it was set up by Indian citizens and access across the heavily guarded border is not possible. The Tribunal was also mandated to investigate how the violations of human rights by the militants intersect with those security forces.

== Findings ==
In December 2009 the International People's Tribunal released a report titled Buried Evidence. The Tribunal alleges that the insurgency from 1989–2009 has caused more than 70,000 deaths. According to Angana P. Chatterji, the convener of the Tribunal, they investigated fifty killings by the Indian Security Forces; except one all were declared militant. Of those who were killed in these incidents 39 were Muslims, four were Hindus and rest were of undetermined religious background. The Tribunal found that only one of those killed was a militant and the rest were killed in staged encounters. She further stresses the need of an independent inquiry into forced disappearances and fake encounters, which according to her may result in some correlation of 8000 disappearances with the bodies in unmarked graves. The Tribunal found 2700 (about 3000) unknown and unmarked graves having 2900 bodies in three districts of Jammu and Kashmir. A gravedigger in a statement to the Tribunal said that he witnessed the burials of 203 people killed extrajudicially between 2002–2006. The Tribunal has criticized the United Nations and its members for failing to stop the fallout of the India's militarization in the valley.

In December 2012 IPTK along with Association of Parents of Disappeared Persons released a report Alleged Perpetrators – Stories of Impunity in Jammu and Kashmir, which alleged involvement of about 500 Indian Armed Forces officials in human rights abuses in Kashmir. Those accused included three Brigadier rank officers of Indian Army. The access to the official record available with the police along with interviewing the affected families helped in preparing the report, which took over two years to get completed. The report that alleges that the perpetrators of crimes in Kashmir are decorated instead of prosecuted, analysed 214 cases of abuse and further mentions 8,000 forced disappearances and 70 killings.

== Activities ==
In 2008 the Tribunal officials came under attack in the valley allegedly from Indian security forces. Besides spying and harassment of the tribunal, grenades were hurled at Parvez Imroz's residence in Kashmir on 30 June. The tribunal in a memorandum submitted to the government said that the use of landmines by the Indian Security Forces in the valley imperils the lives of civilian population. In June 2010 the tribunal presented its finding to the British Parliamentary Group on Kashmir (APPG-K). The IPTK in November 2010 presented a memorandum along with other human rights organizations. The memorandum asked the US President Barack Obama as well as the international community to play their part in settling the Kashmir dispute that has been lingering on for six decades. Moreover, it asked Obama to raise the issue of Kashmir with Indian premier Manmohan Singh and to not jeopardize this issue on the cost of improving relations with India.

== Reception ==
The local people of the Kashmir valley welcomed the Tribunal and offered their help even when they were threatened. The people according to Imroz were content that this issue is being taken up internationally. The European Parliament supported the Tribunal by inviting them to testify before Parliament's Subcommittee on Human Rights at Brussels and adopting a resolution on allegations of mass graves. in 2008.

== See also ==
- Human rights abuses in Jammu and Kashmir
- Insurgency in Jammu and Kashmir
- Jammu and Kashmir Coalition of Civil Society
- Kashmir conflict
- Rape in Jammu and Kashmir
