= Mae Tao Clinic =

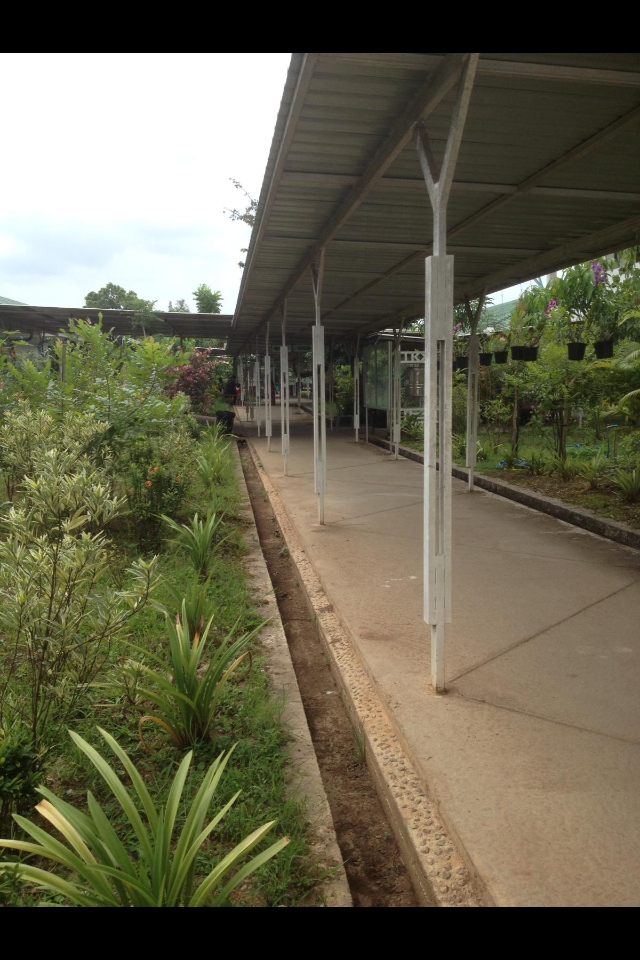

Geography
- Location: Mae Sot, Thailand
- Coordinates: 16.7189°N 98.534300°E

Organisation
- Type: Clinic

History
- Opened: 1988

Links
- Lists: Hospitals in Thailand

The Mae Tao Clinic (MTC), also known as Dr. Cynthia's clinic after its founder Dr. Cynthia Maung, is a community based organisation (CBO), which has been providing primary healthcare service and protection to community from Burma/Myanmar in Western Thailand since 1989. It is based in the border town of Mae Sot, approximately 500 km North West of Bangkok and serves a population of around 150,000 - 250,000 people who shelter in Burma's mountainous border region and, more recently, the growing Burmese migrant workers in Thailand who live in and around Mae Sot.

Mae Tao Clinic has average 110,000 consultations annually. Of them 52% reside in Thailand, who are mostly undocumented and displaced due to armed conflicts or/and poverty and other 48% cross the border to seek health services.

== History ==
In 1988, during Burma's ruling military junta's suppression of the pro-democracy movement, which culminated in the 1988 Uprising (see also 8888 Uprising), Maung was among many Burmese who fled across the border into neighbouring Thailand where she established a makeshift facility in Mae Sot to treat the injuries sustained by fellow refugees. In that year the clinic treated some 2000 individuals. The clinic has grown to offer a range of health care services, social services, training, and outreach programmes as well as child protection and health education. In 2006 the clinic treated 80,000.

MTC patients include sick and wounded refugees, mostly from Karen State, who have been forced from their villages which are burned to the ground in the military junta's 'scorched earth' policy - part of a doctrine known as the 'Four Cuts'.

In the summer of 2008 when American president George Bush visited Thailand, his wife Laura visited the clinic and spoke of her support for Maung and the clinic's work.

== MTC Objectives ==
- To provide health services for displaced Burmese populations along the Thailand-Burma border.
- To provide initial training of health workers and subsequent corollary medical education.
- To strengthen health information systems along the border.
- To improve health, knowledge, attitudes, and practices within local Burmese populations.
- To promote collaboration among local ethnic health organizations.
- To strengthen networking and partnership with international health professionals and institutions.

== Medical Services ==
- Medical Service OPD (outpatients department)
- Medical Service IPD (inpatients department)
- Surgical Service OPD/IPD
- Reproductive Health OPD/IPD
- Child Health Service OPD/IPD
- Health Education and Counselling
- Laboratory and Blood Bank
- Primary Eye Care and Eye Surgery
- Prosthetics and Rehabilitation
- Malaria Treatment
- HIV/AIDS Prevention (Safe Blood, VCT (Voluntary Confidential Testing and Counselling service))
- Tuberculosis Case Finding and Referrals
- Mae Sot Hospital Referrals

== Child Protection Services ==
- Children's Development Center (K-12 school) with 892 students (2017 - 2018 academic year)
- Boarding Houses for CDC Students, 214 children
- Dry Food Program for Boarding Houses supporting 1,964 students

== Current staffing composition ==
- Health Services - 240 staff
- Training & Community Health Outreach - 21 staff
- Operations - 31 staff
- Community Operations - 60 staff
- Burma Based Health Services (Including: Pa Hite) - 57 (8 + 49) staff
- Child Protection - 20 staff
- Education - 60 staff
- Total - 489 staff (October 2017)

== Dr. Cynthia Maung ==
Cynthia Maung was born on December 6, 1959, in Moulmein, Burma (aka Myanmar). The fourth of eight children, she graduated from the Institute of Medication, University of Rangoon, in 1985. Dr. Maung's contribution to the Burmese refugee community in Thailand was recognised by the committee for the Ramon Magsaysay Award for Community Leadership which said:

'[i]n electing Cynthia Maung to receive the 2002 Award [...] the board of trustees recognizes her humane and fearless response to the urgent medical needs of thousands of refugees and displaced persons along the Thailand-Burma border'.

Despite her contribution to the local community the Thai government does not officially recognise her citizenship status; she is essentially a stateless person and does not, therefore, enjoy citizen rights.

== Awards ==
- 2018 - UNDP's N-Peace Award
- 2018 - Roux Price
- 2017 - Baptist World Alliance Honors Cynthia Maung's Work at the Mae Tao Clinic
- 2015 - The 25th Ilga Foundation Award for Public Service
- 2013 - Sydney Peace Prize
- 2012 - National Endowment for Democracy's 2012 Democracy Award
- 2009 - Inspiration Model Award from "Khon Khon Khon", Thai Television Program
- 2008 - Catalonia International Prize along with Aung San Suu Kyi
- 2007 - Asia Democracy and Human Rights Award (Taiwan Foundation for Democracy)
- 2007 - World's Children's Prize for the Rights of the Child Honorary Award (Children's World Association, Sweden)
- 2005 - Nominated as part of the 1,000 Women Nobel Peace Prize Nomination
- 2005 - Unsung Heroes of Compassion Award from the Dalai Lama and Wisdom in Action
- 2005 - The Eighth Global Concern for Human Life Award
- 2005 - Included in Time Magazine's November Article on 18 Global Health Heroes
- 2002 - Magsaysay Award for community leadership
- 2001 - Foundation for Human Rights in Asia Special Award
- 2001 - Van Heuven Goedhart Award
- 1999 - Jonathon Mann Health and Human Rights Award
- 1999 - American Women's Medical Association President's Award
- 1999 - John Humphrey Freedom Award
