= Cultural Dynamics =

- Discipline: Cultural Studies
- Language: English
- Edited by: Cultural Dynamics Editorial Collective

Publication details
- History: 1988 -present
- Publisher: SAGE Publications
- Frequency: Tri-annually
- Impact factor: (2010)

Standard abbreviations
- ISO 4: Cult. Dyn.

Indexing
- ISSN: 0921-3740
- LCCN: 91660259
- OCLC no.: 610354771

Links
- Journal homepage; Online access; Online archive

Cultural Dynamics is a peer-reviewed academic journal that publishes papers three times a year. The journal is edited by the Cultural Dynamics Editorial Collective. It has been in publication since 1988 and is currently published by SAGE Publications.

== Scope ==
Cultural Dynamics publishes research which focuses on the inequalities of the contemporary world and the ways people negotiate these conditions. The journal is interdisciplinary and covers areas such as anthropology, sociology and history as well as any other areas which may cover culture, power and politics.

== Abstracting and indexing ==
Cultural Dynamics is abstracted and indexed in the following databases:

- Academic Search Premier
- International Bibliography of the Social Sciences (IBSS)
- GEOBASE
- SCOPUS
- Sociological Abstracts
- SocINDEX (Full Text Collection)
- Zetoc
