= World Forum for Democratization in Asia =

2005 International summit

The World Forum for Democratization in Asia (WFDA) was set up in 2005 to enhance and promote democracy in Asia. WFDA's secretariat is based in Taipei, Taiwan at the Taiwan Foundation for Democracy (TFD). WFDA has organized several conferences between various civil society organizations, most notably its Biennial Conferences.

== Biennial Conferences ==
The first Biennial was held in Taipei, Taiwan and was designed to "discuss and adopt guidelines to promote the solidarity of Asian democracies, support democracy activists who are opposed to authoritarian regimes, and solicit support from the international community on democratization in Asia"

The second Biennial was held in Manila, Philippines. The third Biennial was held in Seoul, South Korea around the eve of World Democracy Day. A brief controversy ensued when South Korea decided to bar the entry of a Uigyhur activist of German nationality who was scheduled to attend the conference.

== Steering Committee members ==
- Alliance for Reform and Democracy in Asia (ARDA)
- Alternative Asean Network on Burma (ALTSEAN-Burma)
- Asian Focal Point for the International Civil Society Forum for Democracy
- Forum Asia Democracy (FAD)
- Initiatives for International Dialogue (IID)
- Taiwan Foundation for Democracy (TFD)
