= Kashmir: The Case for Freedom =

Collection of essays

- Author: Tariq Ali, Hilal Bhat, Angana P. Chatterji, Habbah Khatun, Pankaj Mishra and Arundhati Roy
- Language: English
- Subject: Kashmir conflict
- Publisher: Verso Books
- Publication date: 2011
- Publication place: United Kingdom
- Pages: 140
- ISBN: 1-844-67735-4

Kashmir: The Case for Freedom is a collection of essays by Tariq Ali, Hilal Bhat, Angana P. Chatterji, Habbah Khatun, Pankaj Mishra and Arundhati Roy, published by Verso.

== Summary ==
The first essay by Pankaj Mishra describes that Kashmiris want true democracy and questions the disregard of the hardships faced by the Kashmiris and evasiveness of the Indian intellectuals on this issue. Tariq Ali in his essay "Story of Kashmir" explains how the valley which was once considered a paradise changed into a disputed region. Arundhati Roy in "Azadi: The only thing Kashmiris want" discusses Jawaharlal Nehru's stance on the Kashmir issue by referring to his speeches, letters, telegrams and quotes under the header "Seditious Nehru." Moreover, Roy elucidates what freedom means to Kashmiris. While questioning India's liberal democracy, she criticises journalists for not raising their voice against the human rights abuses against the Kashmiri people by Indian security forces. According to Roy Kashmir was never an integral part of India. Hilal Bhatt shares his experience of a train journey, which was marred by the violence that erupted after the Babri Mosque debacle. Bhatt who lost his friends in the violence during the journey, expresses how the announcement at reaching Aligarh railway station made him realise the meaning of the word freedom. The essay also includes a poem by the sixteenth Queen of Kashmir, Habbah Khatun. Angana P. Chatterji discusses how militarisation has affected the lives of the people in the valley in her piece "The Militarised Zone", while Tariq Ali describes his views in "Afterword".

== Reviews ==
According to Manisha Gangahar, the book states the ground reality of the Kashmir region. Arifa Akbar for The Independent writes: "This collection speaks urgent truths about the disputed Kashmir region and its struggle for independence (azadi)."
