= Ramanlal Desai =

Indian Gujarati language writer

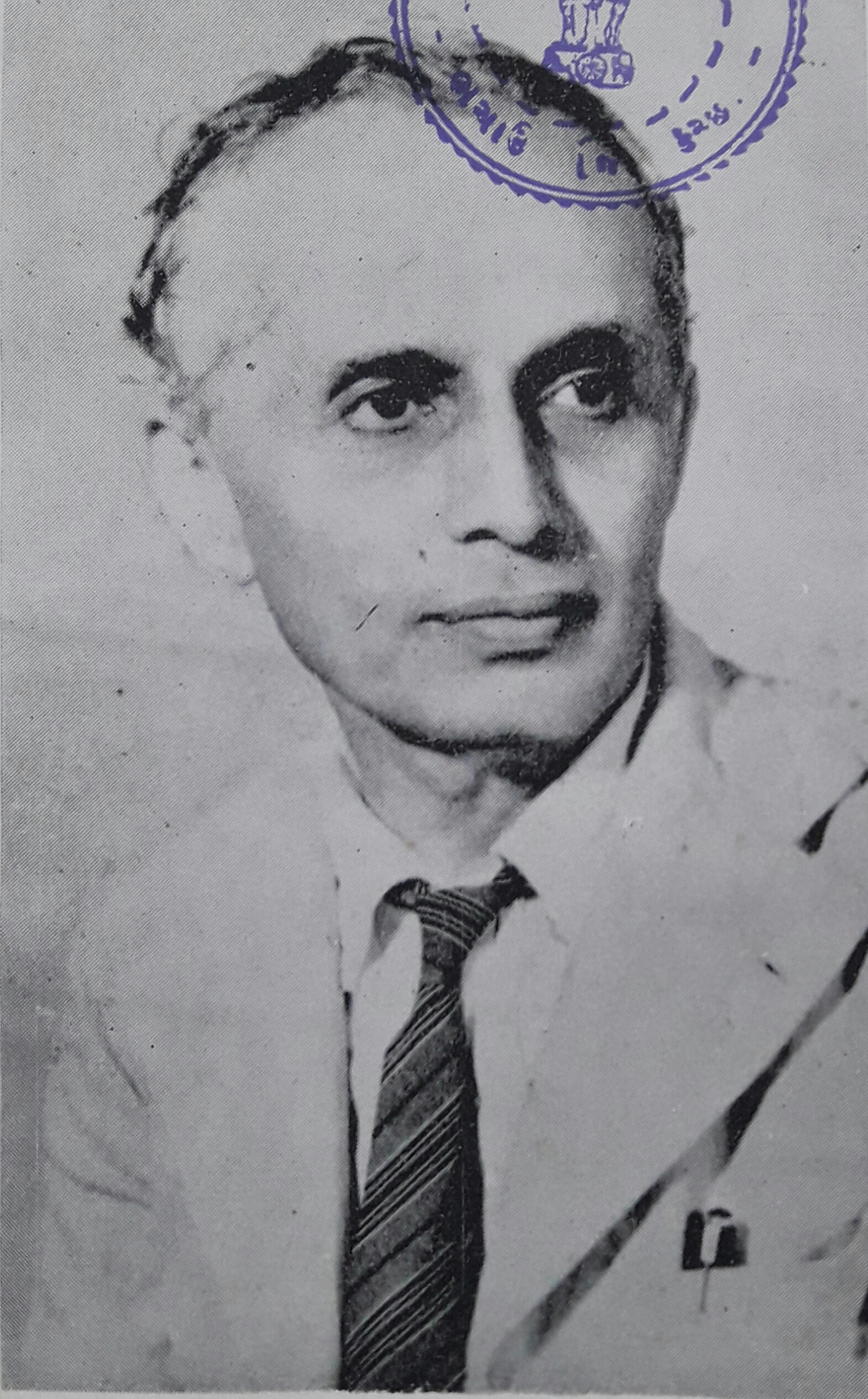
- Born: Ramanlal Vasantlal Desai; 12 May 1892; Sinor, Bombay Presidency, British India
- Died: 20 September 1954 (aged 62)
- Spouse: Kailasvati (m. 1912; died 1927)
- Children: 2 including (Akshay Desai)
- Writing career
- Notable awards: Ranjitram Suvarna Chandrak (1932)

Ramanlal Vasantlal Desai (12 May 1892 – 20 September 1954) was an Indian Gujarati language writer. He is considered as an important figure of the Gujarati literature as well as Gujarati novel writing. He wrote 27 novels, among which, Bharelo Agni and Gramalakshmi are considered to be his magnum opus. His other notable and massive work is Apsara, essays divided in five volumes which is based on the life of prostitutes. He was awarded Ranjitram Suvarna Chandrak in 1932.

== Life ==
Desai was born on 12 May 1892 in Sinor, a village located on the bank of Narmada river to Vasantlal and Manibai. His family was a native of Kalol of Panchmahal district. His father Vasantlal was agnostic in nature while his mother Manibai was vaishanva and religious. Vasantlal ran a Gujarati magazine, Deshbhakta (Lit. The Patriot). Beside the printing house of his father Vasantlal, there was a book shop which provided him books for reading during his school life. Desai studied until sixth standard at his uncle's home in Shinor and then moved to Vadodara in 1902 and was admitted in the Branch School. He was engaged to Kailasvati at age of eight and they married in 1912.

He matriculated in 1908 and shifted to Vadodara college where he failed in Mathematics both in the first year and inter year exams. He used to discuss with friends about topics like Socialism, Communism and marriage and delivered lectures on these topics. His poem Shu Karu? (Lit. What should I do?) was published in a college magazine and later published in his poetry collection Niharika. He passed B.A. in 1914 with the first rank and was selected as a fellow. He wrote a play entitled Samyukta which was staged at Gujarati Sahitya Parishad held at Surat in 1915. He completed Master of Arts in 1916 with English and Gujarati literature. He could not get second rank and thus he could not fulfill his dream to be a professor. He joined Shri Sayaji High School as a teacher, and few months later, in November 1916, he was appointed the head clerk in the Baroda State, where he later held various positions before retiring in 1948. He died on 20 September 1954 due to heart failure.

Desai was the president of Pragatishil Sahitya Mandal and also of the Baroda Sahitya Sabha in 1937.

His son, Akshay Desai, was a renowned Indian sociologist.

== Works ==
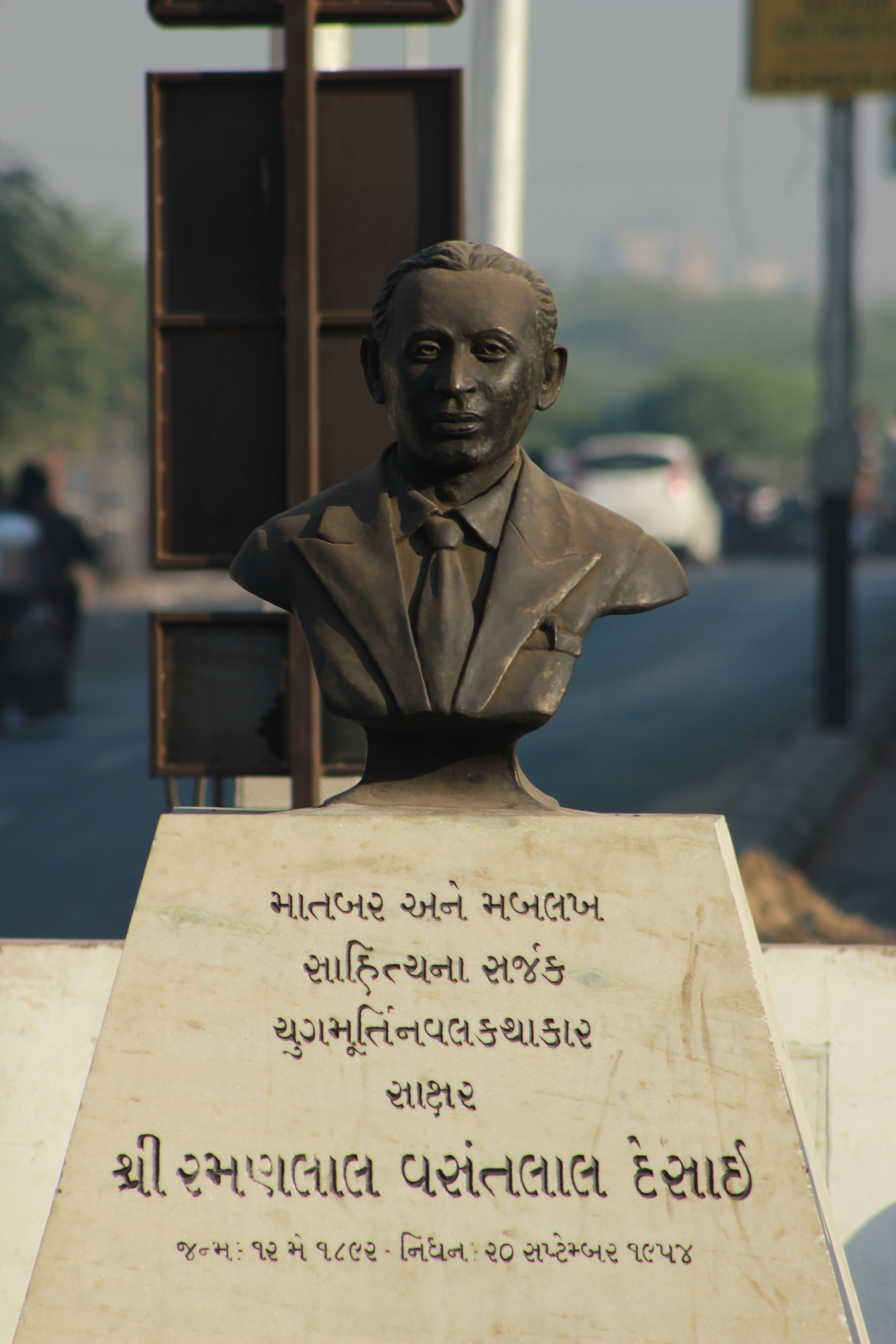
Bust of Ramanlal Desai in Vadodara

Desai was the contemporary of Gujarati novelists K M Munshi and Dhumketu. Desai is mostly known for his novels depicting the Gujarati middle class life and characters. He has also written short stories, plays, poems, character-sketches, travelogues, historical essays, literary criticism and autobiography.

Samyukta, a play, was the first literary writing of Desai. His first novel Thaug (1924-1925) was serialised in Navagujarat, a Gujarati magazine.

Novels

Desai had written 27 novels.

Jayanta was his first novel to be published in book form. His last novel Aankh ane Anjan was published posthumously in 1960. All of his novels can be divided in three groups. The first group, contains 8 novels, is based on historical and mythological themes. The second group of 12 novels deals with the social life of Gujarat and the ideas and activities of Mahatma Gandhi. The third group, consists of 7 novels published after 1941, influenced by Marxist ideology. He serialised all his novels in periodicals. After G. M. Tripathi, Desai was the first Gujarati novelist who wrote his novels with historical events that shaped the contemporary milieu. He deeply studied about particular historical era before writing these novels and he also visited some places, which is depicted in these novels, so that he could write an authentic description of the places. Desai's novels reflect the ideas and thoughts of Mahatma Gandhi, though he had never met Gandhi. He depicted the spirit of the days of freedom struggle of India.

His novels, which have historical or mythical themes, include Bharelo Agni (1935), Kshitij Vol. 1‐2 (1938, 1941), Thug (1938), Pahadna Pushpo Vol. 1‐2 (1943, 1949), Kalbhoj (1950), Shauryatarpan (1951), Balajogan (1952) and Shachi Pulomi (1954), among which Bharelo Agni, is considered to be Desai's magnum opus, dealing with the Indian Rebellion of 1857.

Sirisha (1927), Kokila (1928), Divyachakshu (1932) and Gramalakshmi (Vol. 1-4, 1933-1937) are considered as his major novels which deal with Gandhian themes like Indian freedom movement, the removal of untouchability, the uplift of woman, the reconstruction of rural India, the Swadeshi Movement, non-violent resistance and other things which Gandhi had preached and practised. But Desai is also acclaimed for his social novels, which are characterised by human emotions like love, hate, compassion, revenge, tolerance and impatience with the social, economic and political problems of his days. Through his social novel, Desai suggests that these problems can be solved by following the Gandhian ideals. His novel Divyachakshu (1932) presents the documentary picture of the days of freedom struggle with the backdrop of triangular love story. Purnima (1932) is a story of young girl who was driven to prostitution by her elders and the circumstances. Gramalakshmi Vol. 1-4 (1933-1937) is considered as his most expensive as well as the most idealistic novel. Consisting of 1233 pages, it deals with almost every conceivable ill of the rural society. His other social novels are Sirisha (1927), Hridayanatha (1930), Bamsari (1933), Patralalasa (1934), Snehayajna (1931), Sobhana (1939) and Hridayavibhuti (1940).

During the later years of his life, Desai moved towards Marxism and wrote novels based on it like Chhayanat (1941), Jhanjhavat Vol. 1‐2 (1948, 1949), Pralay (1950) Saundaryajyot (1951), Snehasrishti (1953), Trishanku (1955) and Aankh ane Anjan (1960).

Others

His play Samyukta (1923) was followed by Sankita Hridaya (1925), Anjani (1938), Pari Ane Rajakumar (1938), Gramaseva (1941), Tapa Ane Rupa (1950), Pushponi Shrishtima (1952), Uskerayelo Atma (1954), Kavidarshan (1957), Baiju Bavaro (1959) and Videhi (1960). The first three and Gramaseva are full length plays while the rest are short plays and one-act plays. These plays have played an important role in the development of the Gujarati theatre. In his play Sankit Hriday, Jayshankar Sundari played a role.

He wrote about 140 short stories but, as the Encyclopedia of Indian Literature noted, he has not been able to contribute substantially to the development of Gujarati short stories. Because he wrote most of the short stories for popular periodicals of his era. His short stories have been collected in some volumes including Jhakal (1932), Pankaja (1935), Rasabindu (1942), Kanchan ane Geru (1949), Divadi (1951), Bhagyachakra (1952), Sati ane Svarga (1953), Dhabakata Haiya (1954) and Hirani Chamak (1957).

Desai wrote his autobiography under the titles Gaikal (1950) and Madhyahan Na Mrigjal (1956).

His work Apsara (1933-1949) in five volumes is a study of the life of prostitutes.

== Translations and adaptations ==
Desai's novels Kokila, Divya Chakshu and some other books were translated into Hindi, Marathi and in other Indian languages. The 1937 Hindi film Kokila, directed by Sarvottam Badami, was based on Desai's novel by same name. His other novel Purnima was also adapted into the film.

== Recognition ==
Vishwanath Bhatt, a Gujarati critic, considered Desai as the 'Yugamoorti Vartakar' (the novelist who reflects an age). Desai was awarded Ranjitram Suvarna Chandrak in 1932 for his contribution in Gujarati literature. He also received Hargovinddas Kantawala Prize for his novel Divya Chakshu.
