= Khurram Parvez =

Indian human rights activist

- Born: 1977 (age 48–49); Srinagar, Kashmir, India
- Occupations: Chairperson, Asian Federation Against Involuntary Disappearances (AFAD)
- Known for: Human rights work
- Spouse: Sameena Khurram
- Children: 2
- Awards: Reebok Human Rights Award (2006); Martin Ennals Award for Human Rights Defenders (2023)
- Honours: Featured in Time Magazine's 100 most influential people list (2022)

Khurram Parvez is a Kashmiri human rights activist. He is the chairperson of Asian Federation Against Involuntary Disappearances (AFAD) and the program coordinator of Jammu Kashmir Coalition of Civil Society. Khurram is a recipient of the 2006 Reebok Human Rights Award. Parvez was included in Time's annual list of the 100 most influential people in 2022.

== Education and work ==
Parvez holds a Masters in Mass Communication from Kashmir University. He was a Chevening Fellow at University of Glasgow in 2005.

He co-founded Jammu Kashmir Coalition of Civil Society (JKCCS) along with Parvez Imroz in 2000, and serves as its program coordinator. JKCCS works on building alliances among local civil society organizations and publishes reports on human rights violations in the territory.

He serves as the Chairperson of Asian Federation Against Involuntary Disappearances and the Deputy Secretary-General of the International Federation for Human Rights. He holds the position of Distinguished Scholar at the Political Conflict, Gender and People’s Rights Initiative at the University of California, Berkeley's Center for Race and Gender.

In 2023, Parvez was awarded the Martin Ennals Award for Human Rights Defenders.

== Detentions ==
=== 2016 arrest ===
On 14 September 2016, he was first stopped by Indian authorities at New Delhi airport to prevent him from attending the 33rd UN Human Rights Council Session in Geneva to brief UN bodies, including the UN High Commissioner for Human Rights, and foreign governments on the alleged atrocities committed by Indian state forces in Jammu and Kashmir during the 2016 Kashmir violence.

Parvez was later arrested on 15 September by Indian officials from his home in Srinagar. Later on 16 September 2016, Jammu Kashmir Coalition of Civil Society stated that Khurram Parvez had been detained without formal arrest or notifications, and in violation of his rights to information, and legal counsel. On 21 September, a day after a sessions court ordered his release, Khurram Parvez was detained a second time under Public Safety Act (PSA). On 25 November 2016, Jammu Kashmir High Court quashed his detention, even then he was not released from prison. After 76 days of detention, on 30 November he was finally released from prison following the orders of Jammu and Kashmir High Court.

=== Cases under UAPA ===
Parvez was arrested on November 22, 2021 by the National Investigation Agency (NIA) under the Unlawful Activities (Prevention) Act (UAPA). In this case, Parvez was accused of being part of a "larger conspiracy" that involved recruiting overground workers for Lashkar-e-Taiba, a Pakistan-based organization designated as a terrorist group by India. His home and office were raided.

In March 2023, Parvez was arrested in another case, nearly two and a half years after the FIR was filed, although he had already been detained since November 2021. Journalist Irfan Mehraj, alleged Hizbul Mujahideen commander Ghulam Hassan Ganai, JKCCS president Parvez Imroz, and Natasha Rather, a member of the JKCCS, have also been accused in this case which was filed on 18 October 2020. As part of the evidence, the NIA referenced two human rights reports published by JKCCS, titled "Structures of Violence" (2015) and the "Torture Report" (2019), arguing that these reports promoted secessionism and harmed India’s image under the guise of human rights work.

==== Reactions to arrest ====
BBC reported that his arrest "caused global outrage amid calls for his release." His arrest has been seen as a part of the authorities' ongoing human rights violations in Kashmir and criticized by several international human rights organizations. Some lawyers have voiced concerns, suggesting that treating Human Rights reports published by JKCCS as evidence of terrorism could deter other groups from investigating and reporting on human rights abuses.

Civicus, an international non-profit, has stated that Parvez "has faced systematic harassment" because of his work.

On 20 April 2004, Parvez and other activists, including Aasia Jeelani, were monitoring elections near the Line of Control in Kupwara district. The car they were travelling in was blown up by an improvised explosive device; Jeelani and their driver were killed and Parvez sustained serious injuries, having a leg amputated.

== Personal life ==
Parvez is married to Sameena Khurram. They have a son.

== Bibliography ==
- Listening to Grasshoppers: Field Notes on Democracy
- Kashmir: The Case for Freedom
