= Sunita Danuwar =

Nepalese activist (1977–2024)

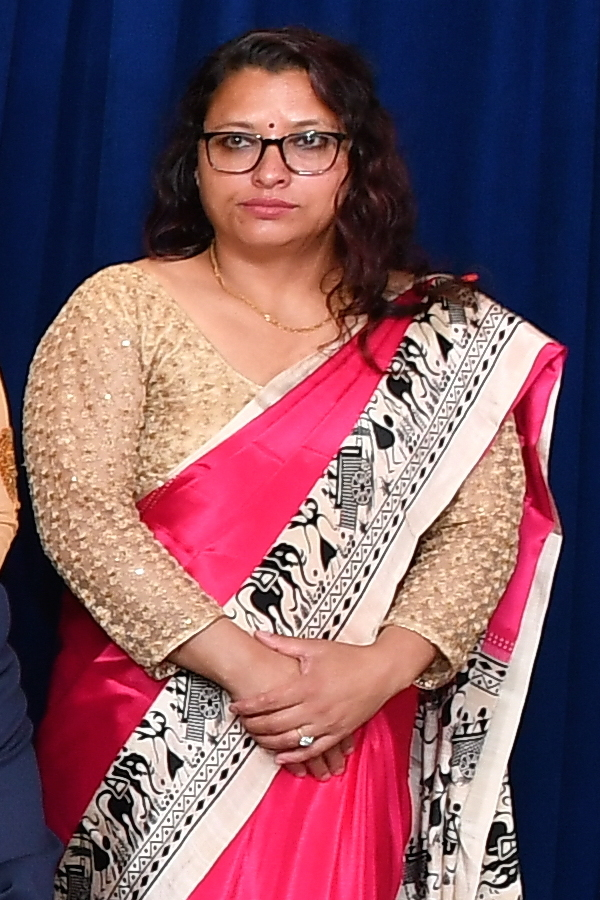
- Sunita Danuwar in 2018
- Born: July 16, 1977; Dailekh, Nepal
- Died: December 23, 2024 (aged 47)
- Occupation: President of Sunita Foundation
- Known for: Social activism
- Website: Official website

Sunita Danuwar (July 16, 1977 – December 3, 2024) was a Nepalese human rights activist and the founder of Sunita Foundation and Shakti Samuha, a non-governmental organization based in Nepal formed by women rescued from brothels in India that works against the trafficking of women.

== Early life ==
=== Childhood (1977-1992) ===
Sunita Danuwar was born to parents Ganga Ban and Chandrakala Ban in Kasigadh VDC, Dailekh district, which is located in the remote western part of Nepal. Because girls' education is not a priority for most poor Nepalese families, Danuwar didn't have the opportunity to go to school during her childhood. Nevertheless, her father taught her the Nepali alphabet and numbers. At the age of five, after having lost six brothers and sisters from malnutrition, poverty and lack of access to health care, she and her family settled in Jammu and Kashmir, a state in northern India. When Danuwar reached the age of fourteen, the family decided to move again, this time to Nainital.

=== Six months in a brothel (1996) ===
On the way to Nainital, her family stopped in Almora, a town in the state of Uttarakhand, in order to make some money to continue their travels. There, they met two Nepali tractor drivers and befriended them. When Danuwar's family finally gathered enough funds to continue the journey toward Nainital, the two tractor drivers drugged Danuwar's food, causing her to lose consciousness. They sold her to a brothel in Mumbai for 40,000 Indian rupees.

When she realized she was in a brothel, Danuwar categorically refused to have sexual intercourse despite mental and physical torture she was enduring and she thought about committing suicide. Approximatively one month later, she was sold by the brothel owner to another brothel for 100,000 Indian rupees. There too she was tortured and threatened with death until the brothel owner ordered five men to rape her, leaving her with no other option but to work as a forced sex-worker during six months. She finally escaped on February 5, 1996, thanks to the major raids of brothels in Mumbai during that year, launched upon the huge pressure coming from national- and international-level child rights organizations to save minor children from forced sex slavery. During those raids, 484 girls and women were rescued from brothels. Over 40% of them were from Nepal, like Danuwar.

Seven months later, nearly 128 Nepali girls and women returned in Kathmandu, Nepal and fifteen of them, including Danuwar, decided to create an organization called Shakti Samuha, Nepali for Power Group.

== Activism and later life ==
=== Shakti Samuha ===
Danuwar and her friends created Shakti Samuha in 1996. The main objective was to raise awareness about the issue of illegal trafficking of girls and women. She began to spend a lot of time walking the streets of several Nepali villages to warn young girls and women at risk of being trafficked. She also wrote scripts for plays in which she would act either as a brothel owner or as a broker, staging her plays with other members of Shakti Samuha directly in the streets.

=== Education ===
In 2001, Danuwar entered seventh grade in Kathmandu, Nepal and stayed two years at school thanks to the donor support of Shakti Samuha. In 2009, she managed to find funding to attend courses of school support for four months and then joined SLC, the final year of schooling in Nepal. She passed the secondary school examination and studied for two years in Padma Kanya Multiple Campus, Kathmandu.

=== Other commitments ===
Danuwar has been a board member of the Global Alliance Against Traffic in Women since 2008 and one of the Executive Board members of NGO Federation of Nepal (NFN). She was also a chairperson of the Alliance Against Trafficking in Women and Children in Nepal (AATWIN) from 2009 to 2010. On April 14, 2015, she was part of the Panel of Speakers of a high-level event on the United Nations Voluntary Trust Fund for Victims of Trafficking in Persons.

After the April 2015 Nepal earthquake, Danuwar called for the greatest possible vigilance and enjoined girls and women in particular to protect themselves against sex trafficking. She declared "We are getting reports of [individuals] pretending to go for rescuing and looking at people." Shakti Samuha was also one of Childreach International's partner in its Taught, Not Trafficked project. Concerning that project, she stated: "As a survivor of trafficking, I know how evil and damaging the practice is, and what consequences it has not just for those trafficked but whole communities. Childreach International's Taught, Not Trafficked project is a hugely important campaign that will help us reduce child trafficking in Nepal and hopefully, with the right education and storytelling, prevent it from happening in the future."

Danuwar is also one of the two main characters of The Color of Brave, a Nepali documentary directed by the filmmaker Binod Adhikari.

=== Death ===
Danuwar died in her sleep on December 23, 2024.

== Awards and honors ==
- In 2012, Danuwar received a letter of honor from the US Special Operations Command in which they were recognizing her combat against human trafficking.
- In 2013, she was awarded the Ramon Magasaysay for her group Shakti Samuha in the field of women trafficking.
- In 2014, she was selected as one of the finalists of Roland Berger Human Dignity Award.
- In 2014, she was one of the ten persons who received the Child 10 (C10) Award for their fight against the trafficking of children.
- In 2018, she received recognition from the U.S. Department of State in Washington.

== Quotes ==
- "We are very hopeful that community police will cooperate to create a respectable workplace environment for women in the entertainment sector," (Sunita Danuwar's statement concerning the six-day training project organized by the NGO Free the Slaves)
- "This is great honor for me and my organization," (Sunita Danuwar's reaction after Shakti Samuha received French Republic Human Rights Award)
- "We are very glad to be honored with such prize. It is the first occasion that any organization in Nepal bagged with Asian level international prize."(Sunita Danuwar's reaction after Shakti Samuha won the 2013 Ramon Magsaysay Award)
- "This is the time when the brokers go in the name of relief to kidnap or lure women. We are distributing assistance to make people aware that someone might come to lure them," (Sunita Danuwar's statement after the April 2015 Nepal earthquake)
- "Trafficking has been increasing massively after the earthquakes. For the sex trafficker, this is the favorable time to go communities and lure women and girls away to India, the Gulf countries and other places, giving them false promises of better opportunities. We are hearing that small girls from the most affected districts are being trafficked in just this way. This is what is happening with these women and girls — please help us put a stop to it." (Sunita Danuwar's statement after the April 2015 Nepal earthquake)
