= Taiwan Foundation for Democracy =

Non-partisan non-profit organisation

- 財團法人臺灣民主基金會
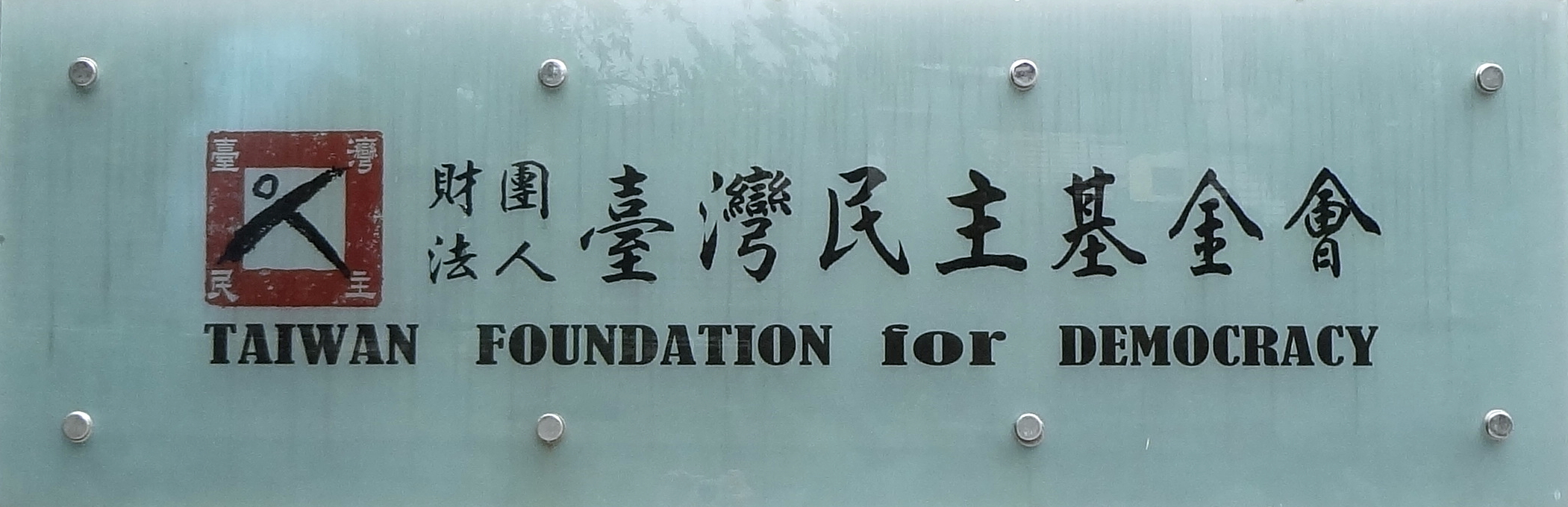
- Formation: 17 June 2003
- Headquarters: Taipei, Taiwan
- Key people: Han Kuo-yu (Chairman); Joseph Wu (Vice Chairman)
- Website: www.tfd.org.tw

The Taiwan Foundation for Democracy (TFD; Chinese: 財團法人臺灣民主基金會; pinyin: Cáituán Fǎrén Táiwān Mínzhǔ Jījīnhuì; Pe̍h-ōe-jī: Châi-thoân Hoat-jîn Tâi-oân Bîn-chú Ki-kim-hōe) is a non-partisan non-profit organisation headquartered in Taipei. The foundation, established in June 2003, is both initiated and funded by the Ministry of Foreign Affairs of the Republic of China. Its stated purpose is to "promote democracy around the world".

== History ==
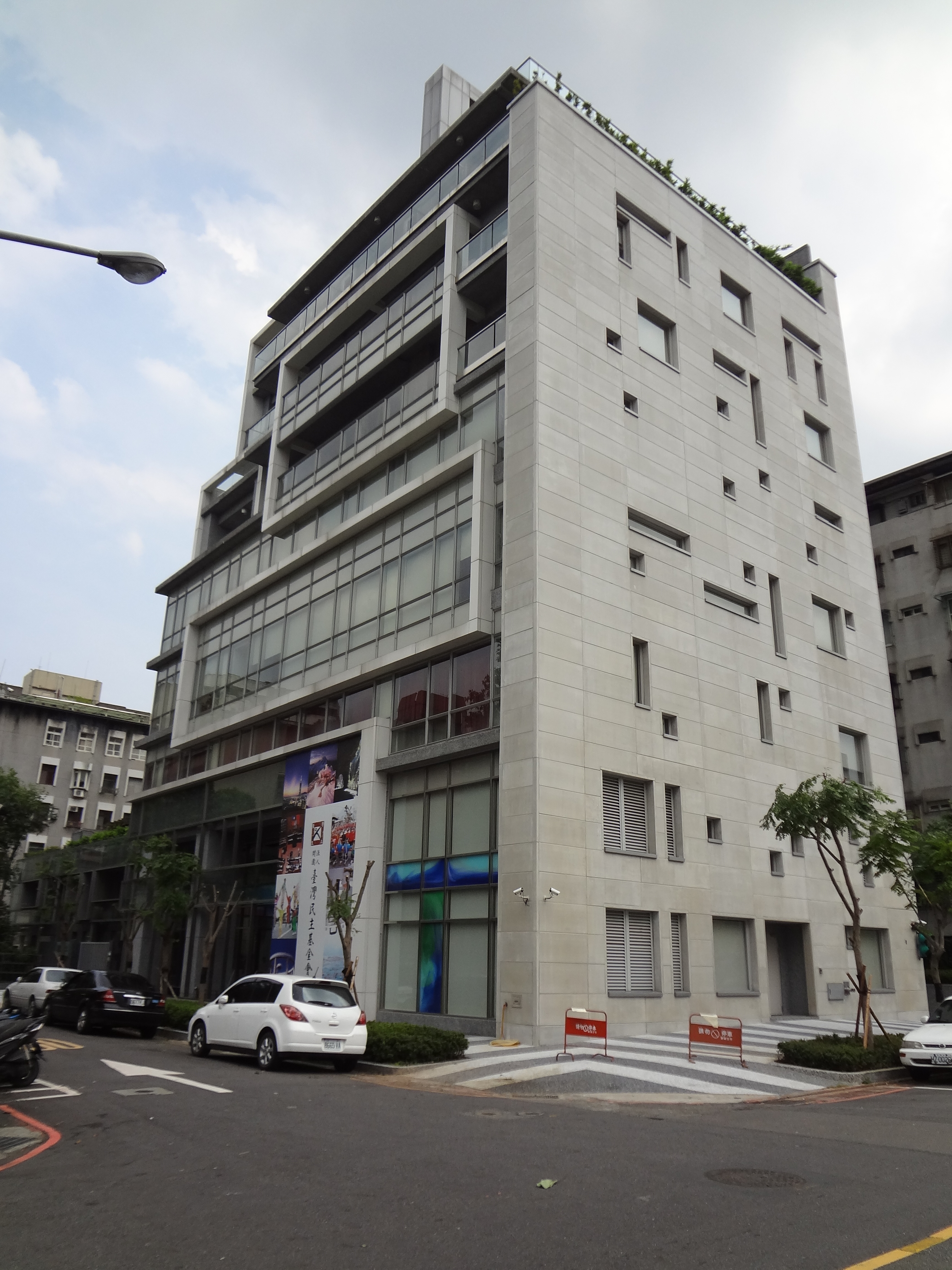
TFD headquarters in Daan District, Taipei

TFD was one of the largest donors to the Victims of Communism Memorial Foundation, donating US$1 million towards the construction of the Victims of Communism Memorial in Washington, DC.

On 9 November 2009, TFD unveiled a segment of the Berlin Wall to mark the 20th anniversary of the fall of the Berlin Wall as a symbol of the quest for global democracy.

On 3 August 2022, TFD was sanctioned by the Taiwan Affairs Office for supporting Taiwanese independence as a "diehard "Taiwan independence" separatist" organization.

== Organizational structure ==
- Secretariat
- Research and Development Department
- International Cooperation Department
- Domestic Affairs Department
- Asia-Pacific Democracy Resource Center

== Programs ==
- World Forum for Democratization in Asia (WFDA)
- Asia Democracy and Human Rights Award

== Publications ==
TFD publishes the semi-annual Taiwan Journal of Democracy (TJD, ISSN 1815-7238), a refereed journal for the study of democratic politics, especially democratic development in Taiwan and other Asian democracies.

TFD also publishes in English the annual China Human Rights Report, Taiwan Democracy Quarterly in Mandarin Chinese with an English edition due in late 2018, among other publications.
