= Jammu and Kashmir Human Rights Commission =

Autonomous state quasi-judicial body

The Jammu & Kashmir Human Rights Commission was an autonomous state body with quasi-judicial powers tasked to investigate any violation of human rights in Jammu and Kashmir, India. The body was constituted in January 1997 by the National Conference government under the Protection of Human Rights Act. The commission consists of a chairman and four other members.

Officially, cases from the Jammu and Kashmir Human Rights Commission went to the National Human Rights Commission of India.

== See also ==
- National Human Rights Commission of India
