= Kerala State Consumer Disputes Redressal Commission =

- Established: 1986; 40 years ago
- Location: Kerala State Consumer Dispute Redressal Commission, Chinmaya Mission Lane, Vazhuthacaud, Thiruvananthapuram-10.Office
- Judge term length: 3 years from the date of entering office or up to 65 years of age (whichever is earlier)
- Website: https://civilsupplieskerala.gov.in/index.php/content/index/cdrc

President, Kerala State Consumer Disputes Redressal Commission
- Currently: Hon'ble Justice P.Q. Barkathali

Kerala State Consumer Disputes Redressal Commission is an autonomous, statutory and constitutional institution formed as a quasi judicial body in Kerala under Section 24-B of the Consumer Protection Act, 1986 to protect the rights of consumers. It is a system of alternate dispute resolution between conflicting parties during the process of trade. The president of the States Consumer Disputes Redressal Commission is appointed by the state government in consultation with the Chief Justice of state high court.

== History and objective ==
Kerala State Consumer Disputes Redressal Commission was formed to promote and protect the rights of consumers as per the Consumer Protection Act 1986.

Kerala State Consumer Disputes Redressal Commission is the first commission in the country to initiate redressal of collaborative practices online. Under this system parties in the dispute by themselves or through their counsel through a call express their interest for their case to be part of Eadalat to the court Master.

== Composition ==
Following shall be the composition of Kerala State Consumer Disputes Redressal Commission:

1. President and
2. Not less than two members and not more than that prescribed in State Act.

President will be appointed by state Government in consultation with the Chief Justice of state High Court. The eligibility for president is that he should be serving or served as Judge in any High Court. Members should be of 1. Not less than 35 years of age and 2. recognised university bachelor's degree 3. With good ability, integrity and standing and with proficient experience of 10 years and expertise knowledge in subjects of accountancy, law, commerce, economics, industry, administration and public affairs and problem solving ability in same.

Also not more than fifty percent of members of committee should be from judicial background.

Hon'ble Justice P.Q. Barkathali is the President of Kerala State Consumer Disputes Redressal Commission.

== Levels and jurisdiction ==
Kerala State Consumer Disputes Redressal Commission was formed for promoting and protecting the rights of consumers through three levels with the below mentioned jurisdiction:

- District Commission (earlier referred to as District Forum) can accept complaints from consumer if the value of goods or services is up to ₹1 crore (Earlier limit was ₹20 lakh).
- State Commission can accept complaints from consumer if the value of goods or services is more than ₹1 crore but less than ₹10 crores ( earlier limit was between ₹20 lakh and ₹1 crore).
- National Commission can accept complaints from consumer if the value of goods or services is more than 10 crores.

== Filing complaints ==
Kerala State Consumer Disputes Redressal Commission laid down below process of filing and resolving complaints:

Complaints can be filed electronically and examination of disputing parties is done through video-conferencing, which includes hearing and/or examination through any other mode. The time period for resolving dispute in case the complaint does not require analysis and testing of product quality is 3 months from the date of receipt of notice by the opposite party. However, if the complaint requires analysis or testing of product quality the time limit for resolving dispute is within 5 months. Complaints can be filed using E-Daakhil portal.

== Penalties and imprisonment ==
- Manufacturers and Service providers are made punishable as a criminal offence for giving misleading information or for wrong advertisement of product.
- Punishment may include fine of Rs 10 lakhs or imprisonment for 2 years or both.

== Investigative agency ==
- Violation of consumer rights or unfair trade practices is investigated by the Investigation wing headed by Director-General level position in Central Consumer Protection Authority (CCPA).

== Important terms ==
Following are the important terms in Kerala State Consumer Disputes Redressal Commission:

- As per the act "Goods" means anything purchased by consumers either in retail or wholesale from retailers or wholesalers. They can either be produced or manufactured.
- As per the act "services" means those which are in the form of "transport, telephone, electricity, housing, banking, insurance, medical treatment etc".
- As per the act consumer means " any person who buys any goods or hires or avails any services for a consideration which has already been paid or promised or partly paid and partly promised or under any system of deferred payment".
- Person includes anyone buying goods, either through online system or direct or offline, by way of teleshopping, or through mode of electronic includes direct selling or in a multi-level marketing.
- Consumer does not include person buying or availing goods or services for resale or for any other commercial purpose.
- For the purpose of commission the terms are referred in Consumer Protection Act'2019.

== Challenges ==
- The district, state and national level commissions face challenges of understaffing or non fulfillment of vacancies in time.
- The report prepared by senior advocate on the directions of Supreme Court of India found out many shortcomings in the offices of district and state consumer redressal bodies in many states of India. These include absence of storage rooms for case files, lack of member chambers for convenience of members hearing complaints, non availability of court rooms and washrooms in selective cases.

== See also ==
- Department of Consumer Affairs (Kerala)
- National Consumer Disputes Redressal Commission
- Odisha State Consumer Dispute Redressal Commission
- Andhra Pradesh State Consumer Disputes Redressal Commission
