= Consumer court =

Special purpose court in India

Consumer court is a special purpose court in India. It primarily deals with consumer-related disputes, conflicts, and grievances. The court holds hearings to adjudicate these disputes.

When consumers file a case, the court primarily looks to see if they can prove the exploitation through evidence such as bills or purchase memos. In cases where no such evidence is presented, courts rarely rule in favor of the plaintiff. The court mostly decides its verdict based on the violations of consumer rights (if any). The point of having a separate forum for consumer disputes is to ensure that such disputes are speedily resolved and make it less expensive.

== Rights provided by consumer courts ==
The rights provided by the court are listed below:

1. Right to Safety: The right to be protected from all types of hazardous goods and services.
2. Right to Information: The right to be fully informed about the performance and quality of all goods and services.
3. Right to Choose: The right to freely choose goods and services.
4. Right to be Heard: The right to be heard in all decision-making processes related to consumer interest.
5. Right to Seek Redressal: The right to seek compensation, whenever consumer rights have been infringed.
6. Right to Consumer Education: The right to complete consumer education.
  There are two more Rights specified but they don't come as part of the 6 main Rights mentioned above.

== List of consumer courts ==
- National Consumer Disputes Redressal Commission (NCDRC): A court that operates nationally and deals with cases where claimed compensation exceeds Ten crores (₹100 million). The National Commission is the apex body of Consumer Courts; it is also the highest appellate court in the hierarchy. The NCDRC is the highest judiciary of the consumer court, the consumer Supreme Court of India.
- State Consumer Disputes Redressal Commission (SCDRC): A court that works at the state level in cases where compensation claimed is between one crore (₹10 million) and Ten crores. The State Commission has appellate jurisdiction over the District Forum.
- District Consumer Disputes Redressal Forum (DCDRF): A court that works at the district level in cases where the claimed compensation is below one crore.

== Process to file a complaint ==
To file a complaint, a consumer obtains a copy of the Consumer Protection Act. The format for filing a complaint is simple, with guidelines provided for reference. It is advisable to describe the facts and support the claim with comprehensive documentation.

- The consumer must attach photocopied documents (evidence and references) in the complaint file.
- A signed Vakalatnama should be attached with the documents. This authorises a lawyer to represent the case in the Consumer Court.

== History ==
The consumer movement a social force originated in the 1960s with the mission of protecting and promoting the interests of consumers against unethical and unfair trade practices. Rampant food shortages, hoarding, black marketing, adulteration of food and edible oil gave birth to the consumer movement. In 1986, the movement led the Indian government to enact the Consumer Protection Act of 1986 (COPRA).

== Objectives ==
The main function of the consumer court is to offer redress to consumers and to maintain seller's orientation toward fairly treating the consumer and respecting their rights. Approaching a consumer court is cheap as plaintiffs can represent themselves without a lawyer and are only required to pay a nominal fee of 100 Indian rupees.

== See also ==
- Small claims court
