= State Consumer Disputes Redressal Commission =

Indian statutory authority for consumer protection

A State Consumer Disputes Redressal Commission is an Indian autonomous, statutory and constitutional institution formed as a quasi judicial body at the state and union territory level under Section 2(44) of the Consumer Protection Act, 2019 to protect the rights of consumers. It is a system of alternate dispute resolution between conflicting parties during the process of trade. The president of the States Consumer Disputes Redressal Commission is appointed by the state government in consultation with the Chief Justice of state high court.

== History and objective ==
States Consumer Disputes Redressal commission in states and union territories of India was formed to promote and protect the rights of consumers as per the Consumer Protection Act 1986. It was renamed from States Consumer Disputes Redressal Forum with the amendment in Consumer Protection Act 2019 from July 2020.

== Composition ==
Following shall be the composition of States Consumer Disputes Redressal Commission:

1. President and
2. Not less than two members and not more than that prescribed in State Act.

President will be appointed by state Government in consultation with the Chief Justice of state High Court. The eligibility for president is that he should be serving or served as Judge in any High Court. Members should be of 1. Not less than 35 years of age and 2. recognised university bachelor's degree 3. With good ability, integrity and standing and with proficient experience of 10 years and expertise knowledge in subjects of accountancy, law, commerce, economics, industry, administration and public affairs and problem solving ability in same.

Also not more than fifty percent of members of committee should be from judicial background.

== Levels and jurisdiction ==
States Consumer Disputes Redressal Commission(India) was formed for promoting and protecting the rights of consumers through three levels with the below mentioned jurisdiction:

- District Commission (earlier referred to as District Forum) can accept complaints from consumer if the value of goods or services is up to ₹50 lakh (Earlier limit was ₹20 lakh).
- State Commission can accept complaints from consumer if the value of goods or services is more than ₹50 lakh but less than ₹2 crores.
- National Commission can accept complaints from consumer if the value of goods or services is more than 2 crores.

== Filing complaints ==
Following is the process of filing and resolving complaints:

Complaints can be filed electronically and examination of disputing parties is done through video-conferencing, which includes hearing and/or examination through any other mode. The time period for resolving dispute in case the complaint does not require analysis and testing of product quality is 3 months from the date of receipt of notice by the opposite party. However, if the complaint requires analysis or testing of product quality the time limit for resolving dispute is within 5 months. Complaints can be filed using E-Daakhil portal.

== Penalties and imprisonment ==
- Manufacturers and Service providers are made punishable as a criminal offence for giving misleading information or for wrong advertisement of product.
- Punishment may include fine of Rs 10 lakhs or imprisonment for 2 years or both.

== Investigative agency ==
- Violation of consumer rights or unfair trade practices is investigated by the Investigation wing headed by Director-General level position in Central Consumer Protection Authority

== Important terms ==
Following are the important terms in States Consumer Disputes Redressal Commission:

- As per the act "Goods" means anything purchased by consumers either in retail or wholesale from retailers or wholesalers. They can either be produced or manufactured.
- As per the act "services" means those which are in the form of "transport, telephone, electricity, housing, banking, insurance, medical treatment etc".
- As per the act consumer means " any person who buys any goods or hires or avails any services for a consideration which has already been paid or promised or partly paid and partly promised or under any system of deferred payment".
- Person includes anyone buying goods, either through online system or direct or offline, by way of teleshopping, or through mode of electronic includes direct selling or in a multi-level marketing.
- Consumer does not include person buying or availing goods or services for resale or for any other commercial purpose.
- For the purpose of commission the terms are referred in Consumer Protection Act'2019.

== Challenges ==
- The district, state and national level commissions face challenges of understaffing or non fulfillment of vacancies in time.
- The report prepared by senior advocate on the directions of Supreme Court of India found out many shortcomings in the offices of district and state consumer redressal bodies in many states of India. These include absence of storage rooms for case files, lack of member chambers for convenience of members hearing complaints, non availability of court rooms and washrooms in selective cases.

== List of States Consumer Disputes Redressal Forum ==
Following is the list of State consumer disputes redressal commission:

Rank	State	States Consumer Disputes Redressal commission
1	Andhra Pradesh	Andhra Pradesh State Consumer Disputes Redressal Commission
2	Arunachal Pradesh	Arunachal Pradesh State Consumer Disputes Redressal Commission
3	Andaman and Nicobar Islands	A & N Islands State Consumer Disputes Redressal Commission
4	Assam	Assam State Consumer Disputes Redressal Commission
5	Bihar	Bihar State Consumer Disputes Redressal Commission
6	Chandigarh	Chandigarh State Consumer Disputes Redressal Commission
7	Chhattisgarh	Chhattisgarh State Consumer Disputes Redressal Commission
8	Dadra & Nagar Haveli & Daman & Diu	Dadra & Nagar Haveli & Daman & Diu State Consumer Disputes Redressal Commission
9	Delhi	Delhi State Consumer Disputes Redressal Commission
10	Goa	Goa State Consumer Disputes Redressal Commission
11	Gujarat	Gujarat State Consumer Disputes Redressal Commission
12	Haryana	Haryana State Consumer Disputes Redressal Commission
13	Himachal Pradesh	Himachal Pradesh State Consumer Disputes Redressal Commission
14	J & K	J & K State Consumer Disputes Redressal Commission
15	Jharkhand	Jharkhand State Consumer Disputes Redressal Commission
16	Karnataka	Karnataka State Consumer Disputes Redressal Commission
17	Kerala	Kerala State Consumer Disputes Redressal Commission
18	Lakshadweep	Lakshadweep State Consumer Disputes Redressal Commission
19	Madhya Pradesh	Madhya Pradesh State Consumer Disputes Redressal Commission
20	Maharashtra	Maharashtra State Consumer Disputes Redressal Commission
21	Manipur	Manipur State Consumer Disputes Redressal Commission
22	Meghalaya	Meghalaya State Consumer Disputes Redressal Commission
23	Mizoram	Mizoram State Consumer Disputes Redressal Commission
24	Nagaland	Nagaland State Consumer Disputes Redressal Commission
25	Odisha	Odisha State Consumer Disputes Redressal Commission
26	Pondicherry	Puducherry State Consumer Disputes Redressal Commission
27	Punjab	Punjab State Consumer Disputes Redressal Commission
28	Rajasthan	Rajasthan State Consumer Disputes Redressal Commission
29	Sikkim	Sikkim State Consumer Disputes Redressal Commission
30	Tamil Nadu	Tamil Nadu State Consumer Disputes Redressal Commission
31	Telangana	Telangana State Consumer Disputes Redressal Commission
32	Tripura	Tripura State Consumer Disputes Redressal Commission
33	Uttar Pradesh	Uttar Pradesh State Consumer Disputes Redressal Commission
34	Uttarakhand	Uttarakhand State Consumer Disputes Redressal Commission
35	West Bengal	West Bengal State Consumer Disputes Redressal Commission

== See also ==
- National Consumer Disputes Redressal Commission
- Telangana State Consumer Disputes Redressal Commission
- West Bengal State Consumer Disputes Redressal Commission
