= M. M. Abdul Khader =

Indian lawyer

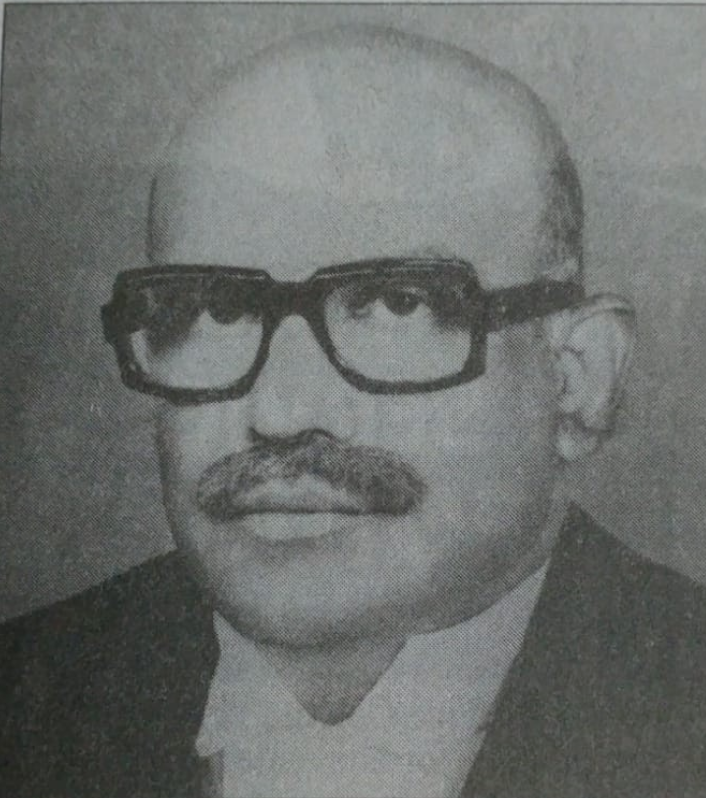

Advocate General of Kerala
- In office 1969–1979
- Appointed by: V. Viswanathan
- Preceded by: P. Subramanian Poti

Member of the Legislative Assembly of Travancore-Cochin
- In office 1952–1954
- Preceded by: Position established
- Succeeded by: T. O. Bava
- Constituency: Alwaye

Personal details
- Born: 27 February 1925 Alwaye, Madras Presidency, British India
- Died: 10 August 1993 (aged 68) Aluva, Kerala, India
- Relatives: M. M. Pareed Pillay (brother); M. K. Mackar Pillay (uncle)
- Occupation: lawyer

Manadath Mohammed Abdul Khader (27 February 1925 – 10 August 1993) was an Indian lawyer, jurist, and politician who served as the Advocate General of Kerala from 1969 to 1979.

== Early life and career ==
Abdul Khader was born on 27 February 1925 in Aluva to M. K. Mohammed Pillay, the younger brother of prominent industrialist and philanthropist, M. K. Mackar Pillay.

In 1952, Abdul Khader was elected to the Legislative Assembly of the newly formed state of Travancore-Cochin from the Aluva constituency, defeating future Kerala Pradesh Congress Committee president T. O. Bava. Abdul Khader lost re-election in 1954 to the same opponent.

Abdul Khader's brother, M. M. Pareed Pillay went on to become the Chief Justice of Kerala and the first chairman of the Kerala State Human Rights Commission.

== Electoral history ==
=== 1952 Travancore-Cochin Legislative Assembly election ===
1952 Travancore-Cochin Legislative Assembly election: Alwaye
Party	Candidate	Votes	%	±%
Independent	M. M. Abdul Khader	15,631	52.10	
INC	T. O. Bava	12,717	42.39	
Socialist Party (India)	Ibrahim Kutty	1,653	5.51	
Margin of victory		2914	7.43	
Turnout		30,001	76.48	
Independent win (new seat)				

=== 1954 Travancore-Cochin Legislative Assembly election ===
1954 Travancore-Cochin Legislative Assembly election: Alwaye
Party	Candidate	Votes	%	±%
INC	T. O. Bava	16,891	54.38	+11.99
Independent	M. M. Abdul Khader	14,170	45.62	−6.48
Margin of victory		2721	8.76	+1.33
Turnout		31,061	78.77	+2.29
INC gain from Independent		Swing	+11.99	
