= Jago Grahak Jago =

Indian consumer awareness program

Jago Grahak Jago (transl. Wake up Customer Wake up) is a consumer awareness programme launched in 2005 by the Ministry of Consumer Affairs, Government of India. Under this scheme, various channels were created to spread awareness about consumer rights and to put an end to malpractices by merchants. Due to this, many ongoing malpractices were put to an end and good-quality products were delivered to the consumer. Under this scheme, a consumer forum was established, and a consumer court was created to handle consumer cases. At the consumer forum, complaints are received and then proceedings over the case are carried out in courts. By providing various helpline numbers Jago Grahak Jago achieved mass popularity and quickly reached out to very end node i.e. consumer.

== Benefits of Jago Grahak Jago Programme ==
- Halt to illegal practices: One of the significant advantages of this programme was that now consumer complaints were immediately looked into, which resulted in the reduction of the number of malpractices carried out in the market.
- Fixed rate on products: The consumer's right of getting the product at a fixed rate is fulfilled i.e. no merchant can charge a consumer more than the Maximum Retail Price.
- Right to bargain: Consumer's right to bargain is ensured.

== Eligibility of Jago Grahak Jago ==
Every Indian consumer is eligible for the program.

Document required for Jago Grahak Jago Program

- Indian national proof
- Receipt of the product.

== Jago Grahak Jago: Filing a Complaint ==
Consumers can complain about a good or service through various modes like the

- National consumer helpline
- Lodging a complaint online
- Approaching the National/District consumer forum

== See also ==
- Consumer Protection Act, 1986
- Consumer Protection Act, 2019
