= Kerala State Police Complaints Authority =

Statutory authority in Kerala, India

Statutory body overview
- Formed: 17 February 2012
- Jurisdiction: Government of Kerala
- Headquarters: Tagore Nagar, Lane No. 2, Vazhuthacaud, Thiruvananthapuram – 695014
- Statutory body executive: V.K. Mohanan (Rtd.Judge), Chairperson
- Parent department: Home Department

The Kerala State Police Complaints Authority (SPCA) is an independent statutory body of the Government of Kerala established under Section 110 of the Kerala Police Act, 2011. It was established in 2012 to examine complaints against police officers and ensure accountability, transparency and fairness in the Kerala Police administration. The SPCA functions as an appellate and investigative body, empowered to conduct inquiries either suo motu or based on petitions received from aggrieved persons or organizations.

== History ==
The State Police Complaints Authority was constituted by the Government of Kerala on 17 February 2012 through G.O. (Rt.) No. 475/2012/Home, under Section 110 of the Kerala Police Act, 2011. The order appointed the chairperson and members of the Authority in accordance with the provisions of the Act.

== Organisation ==
The State Police Complaints Authority is headed by a retired Judge of a High Court, who serves as the chairperson. The Authority includes the Additional Chief Secretary to Government (Home), the Additional Director General of Police (Headquarters), and two other members appointed by the Government.

=== Composition ===
Under the Kerala Police Act, 2011, the State Police Complaints Authority consists of:

- a retired High Court judge, who serves as the chairperson;
- an officer not below the rank of Principal Secretary to Government;
- an officer not below the rank of Additional Director General of Police (ADGP);
- a retired police officer not below the rank of Inspector General of Police (IGP), selected by the Government in consultation with the Leader of the Opposition from a panel provided by the Chairperson of the Kerala State Human Rights Commission; and
- a retired District Judge, selected by the Government in consultation with the Leader of the Opposition from a panel provided by the Kerala Lokayukta.

== Powers and responsibilities ==
- The Kerala State Police Complaints Authority is empowered to inquire into complaints against police officers of the rank of Superintendent of Police (SP) and above, while complaints against officers of the rank of Deputy Superintendent of Police (Dy.SP) and below are dealt with by the District Police Complaints Authorities.
- The SPCA may also inquire into serious complaints against police officers of other ranks, including allegations of sexual harassment of women in custody, death or grievous hurt caused to a person, rape, and other serious misconduct.
- The Authority have the powers of a Civil Court to summon officers, require documents and collect evidence. Government officials must assist in inquiries, and the State Government may initiate departmental or criminal action based on the Authority's recommendations.

== Limitations ==
The SPCA has been criticised for lacking enforcement powers. It can recommend disciplinary action or the registration of a FIR against police officers found guilty, but cannot independently initiate such action or order compensation. Its chairperson, V. K. Mohanan, has called for amendments to the Kerala Police Act to provide the Authority with enforcement powers.

The SPCA has also been criticised over certain aspects of its composition and functioning. A Commonwealth Human Rights Initiative (CHRI) report raised concerns about the presence of serving police officials, as well as the lack of mandatory representation for civil society and women.

The Authority has also faced delays in appointing a Chief Investigation Officer (CIO), despite directions from the Kerala High Court. The lack of an independent investigation officer has limited the Authority's ability to conduct inquiries.

== See also ==
- Kerala State Human Rights Commission (KSHRC)
- Police brutality in India
