= V. Balakrishna Eradi =

Indian judge (1922–2010)

Justice Vettath Balakrishna Eradi

1st President of National Consumer Disputes Redressal Commission
- In office 10 March 1988 – 19 June 1997
- Appointed by: Appointments Committee of the Cabinet
- Preceded by: Position established
- Succeeded by: K. S. Paripoornan

Judge of Supreme Court of India
- In office 30 January 1981 – 19 June 1987
- Nominated by: Y. V. Chandrachud
- Appointed by: N. S. Reddy

9th Chief Justice of Kerala High Court
- In office 19 January 1980 – 29 January 1981
- Nominated by: Y. V. Chandrachud
- Appointed by: N. S. Reddy
- Preceded by: V. P. Gopalan Nambiyar
- Succeeded by: P. Subramanian Poti

Judge of Kerala High Court
- In office 5 April 1967 – 18 January 1980
- Nominated by: K. Subba Rao
- Appointed by: S. Radhakrishnan

Personal details
- Born: 19 June 1922 Calicut, Malabar
- Died: 30 December 2010 (aged 88) Kozhikode
- Citizenship: Indian
- Spouse: Saraswathi Eradi
- Education: Madras Christian College; Madras Law College

Vettath Balakrishna Eradi (19 June 1922 – 30 December 2010) was a judge of the Supreme Court of India. He also served as the Chief Justice of the Kerala High Court, as President of the National Consumer Disputes Redressal Commission (NCDRC) and the Chairman of Ravi & Beas Waters Disputes Tribunal. Eradi was also noted for his role in several spiritual, cultural, and social organizations.

== Career ==
Eradi enrolled as an advocate in Madras High Court on 15 January 1945. He began his profession as a junior lawyer to K. Kuttikrishna Menon, before starting an independent practice in the Madras High Court. He was later appointed by the Madras Government as Junior Counsel to conduct several Government cases.

Eradi shifted his practice to Ernakulam in 1956 when the new High Court of Kerala was established. In 1961, he was appointed Senior Government Pleader in the Kerala High Court where he conducted several important Government cases. He was also doing private practice during this time. In April 1967, Balakrishna was appointed Additional Judge of the Kerala High Court and six months later elevated as Permanent Judge. During his tenure at Kerala High Court, he was appointed chairman of several committees, including the High Court Committee appointed by the Government of Kerala for suggesting ways and means of raising the standard of legal education in the State. Eradi was appointed Chief Justice of the High Court of Kerala in January 1980 and as a judge of the Supreme Court of India a year later. As a Supreme Court judge, he was appointed by Government of India as Chairman of the Ravi and Beas Waters Tribunal for adjudication of the dispute regarding sharing of the Punjab river waters among the States of Punjab, Haryana and Rajasthan. Justice Eradi retired from the Bench of the Supreme Court on attaining the age of superannuation in 1987.

== Post retirement ==
In 1988, he was appointed President of the National Consumer Disputes Redressal Commission, a post he held until he retired in 1997. In 1999 he was appointed Chairman of the National Company Law Tribunal and Appellate Tribunal, a High Level Committee to examine the existing laws relating to winding up proceedings of companies in order to remodel it in line with the latest developments.

Eradi was actively connected with cultural and social service organizations and was President of International Centre for Kathakali, Delhi since 1982 and was also the President of Swaralaya, a Carnatic music society of India. He was a Member of the Council of Management of Sri Sathya Sai Central Trust from its inception in 1972.

After the retirement he stayed in New Delhi with his wife, Saraswathy Eradi and later shifted to Kozhikode and was residing at Chalappuram. Balakrishnan Eradi died on 30 December 2010 at a private hospital in Kozhikode.

== Awards and honors ==
Eradi received several awards during his long career, including the National Press of India Golden Jubilee Award, Rajiv Gandhi Excellence Award, the National Citizenship Award, and the Shiromani Award.
