= Alexander Thomas =

Alexander Thomas may refer to:

- Alexander Thomas (judge), Indian judge
- Alex Thomas (born 1978), musician
- Sandy Thomas, Emmerdale character
- Alexander Thomas (sport shooter) from 2013 European 10 m Events Championships
