= Kaithayil Thomas Koshi =

1st Chief Justice of Kerala High Court

The Honourable Justice Kaithayil Thomas Koshi

1st Chief Justice of Kerala High Court
- In office 1 November 1956 – 31 January 1959
- Appointed by: Rajendra Prasad
- Preceded by: Office established
- Succeeded by: Kesavan Sankaran

Chief Justice of High Court of Travancore-Cochin
- In office 26 January 1952 – 31 October 1956
- Appointed by: Rajendra Prasad
- Preceded by: Puthupally Krishna Pillai
- Succeeded by: Office abolished

Judge of Travancor-Cochin High Court
- In office 12 September 1944 – 25 January 1952
- Appointed by: Chithira Thirunal Balarama Varma

Personal details
- Born: 1 February 1899
- Died: not known
- Occupation: Judge

Kaithayil Thomas Koshi, commonly known as K. T. Koshi, was a distinguished jurist of the former Travancore and Travancore-Cochin judicial systems and became the first Chief Justice of the High Court of Kerala when the new High Court was established on 5 November 1956.

== Career ==
Koshi was appointed a judge of the High Court of Travancore-Cochin state in 1944. He subsequently became Chief Justice of the Travancore-Cochin High Court. After the formation of the state of Kerala, the High Court of Kerala was established in 1956. Koshi was appointed as Chief Justice of the Kerala High Court and served there up to 31 January 1959.
