= Kerala State Human Rights Commission =

Indian state human rights ombudsman

Agency overview
- Formed: 11 December 1998(Notification: S.R.O No. 1066/1998 Dt: 11-12-98)

Jurisdictional structure
- Federal agency (Operations jurisdiction)
- Legal jurisdiction: Kerala
- General nature: Federal law enforcement

Operational structure
- Headquarters: Thiruvananthapuram, Kerala
- Agency executives: Alexander Thomas, Chairperson; P.Mohanadas, Member; V K Beenakumari, Member

Website
- Official website

The Kerala State Human Rights Commission was constituted on 11 December 1998 with the appointment of the first Chairperson Justice M.M. Pareed Pillay, a former Chief Justice of Kerala High Court, along with Dr. S. Balaraman and T.K. Wilson as supporting members by notification S.R.O No. 1066/1998 Dt: 11-12-98. The former Acting Chief Justice of Kerala High Court Justice Alexander Thomas is the present chairperson. The chairperson and members are appointed by the Kerala Governor.

== Organization ==
SHRC comprises a chairman and two members. The chairman should be a retired chief justice or judge of High Court and members should be serving or retired judges of HC or district judges with 7 years experience and knowledge or practical experience in the field of human rights. The SHRC is authorized to inquire into violations of human rights related to matters specified in the state list and concurrent list. But if NHRC or any other statutory commission has already inquired a matter then the SHRC doesn't investigate it. Objectives and duties are same as NHRC.

A sitting judge of HC or sitting district judge can be appointed only after recommendations of CJ of high court. Once the members cease to occupy office they aren't eligible for any appointment under central or state government. Members are not eligible for reappointment subject to age criteria. Term is 70 years of age or three years.

== Composition ==
The Chairperson and members of the Kerala HRC are appointed by the Governor, on the recommendation of a committee consisting of:

- The Chief Minister (chairperson)
- The Home Minister
- The Leader of the Opposition in the legislative assembly
- The Speaker of the legislative assembly

Current composition of members
Position	Name	Ref
Chairperson	Justice Alexander Thomas	
Judicial Member	K. Byjunath	
Member	Geetha. V	

== Investigation Wing ==
The incumbent IGP and Chief Investigation Officer is J. Jayanath IPS.

The Investigation Wing of the Kerala State Human Rights Commission assists the Commission in investigating complaints of human rights violations. It was constituted in 2000 under Section 27 of the Protection of Human Rights Act, 1993, and is headed by an officer of the rank of Inspector General of Police (IGP). The IGP & Chief Investigation Officer (CIO) is assisted by officers of the rank of SP, DySP, CI, SIs, HCs and CPOs.

== Functions ==
According to TPHRA, 1993 (with amendment act 2006), the commission is entitled to perform any of the following functions:

- Autonomously investigate on a petition filed by a victim or any person on his/her behalf as a complaint of

1. Violation of human rights and instigation or
2. Negligence in the prevention of such violations by any public servant.

- Get involved in any proceeding under allegation or violation of human right pending before a court with the approval of that court.
- Inspect living conditions of the inmates in any jail or any other institution under the control of the State Government where persons are detained or lodged for purposes of treatment, reformation or protection.
- Review the safeguards provided in the constitution or any other law for the time it is in force to ensure the protection of human rights
- Review the factors that inhibit the enjoyment of human rights
- Undertake and promote research and awareness programs in the field of human rights
- Promote human right awareness through literacy campaigns, publications, seminars etc. for the protection and safeguards available under human rights practices.
- Encourage involvement of Non-Government Organizations and individuals for expansion work in the field of human rights awareness.
- Perform any other functions that may be considered necessary for the promotion of human rights.

It is clarified that though the commission has the power to inquire in violation of human rights (or instigation thereof) by a public servant; Instances where the human rights are violated by any individual citizen then the commission can intervene, if there is failure or negligence on the part of a public and servant to prevent any such violation.

== See also ==
- Department of Law (Kerala)
- Kerala State Police Complaints Authority (SPCA)
