= Kesavan Sankaran =

Indian Judge

The Honourable Kesavan Sankaran

2nd Chief Justice of Kerala High Court
- In office 2 February 1959 – 28 March 1960
- Appointed by: Rajendra Prasad
- Preceded by: K. T. Koshi
- Succeeded by: Mohammed Ahmed Ansari

Judge of Kerala High Court
- In office 1 November 1956 – 1 February 1959
- Appointed by: Rajendra Prasad

Judge of Travancor-Cochin High Court
- In office July 1949 – 31 October 1956
- Appointed by: Chithira Thirunal Balarama Varma

Personal details
- Born: 29 March 1900
- Died: not known
- Education: LL.B
- Occupation: Judge

Kesavan Sankaran (29 March 1900 – death date unknown) was a prominent jurist of the former Cochin/Travancore-Cochin judicial establishment and later became the 2nd Chief Justice of the High Court of Kerala.

== Career ==
Sankaran started practice as an advocate in 1925 after passing the B.L degree. He was appointed to the Cochin High Court in July 1949, before the integration of the princely-state judicial systems into the modern Kerala High Court. He subsequently served through the constitutional transition following the formation of Travancore-Cochin in 1949 and the establishment of the High Court of Kerala on 1 November 1956.

Upon the retirement of Chief Justice K. T. Koshi, Sankaran was elevated as the Chief Justice of the Kerala High Court on 1 February 1959. He held office until 29 March 1960.
