= KHCAA Golden Jubilee Chamber Complex =

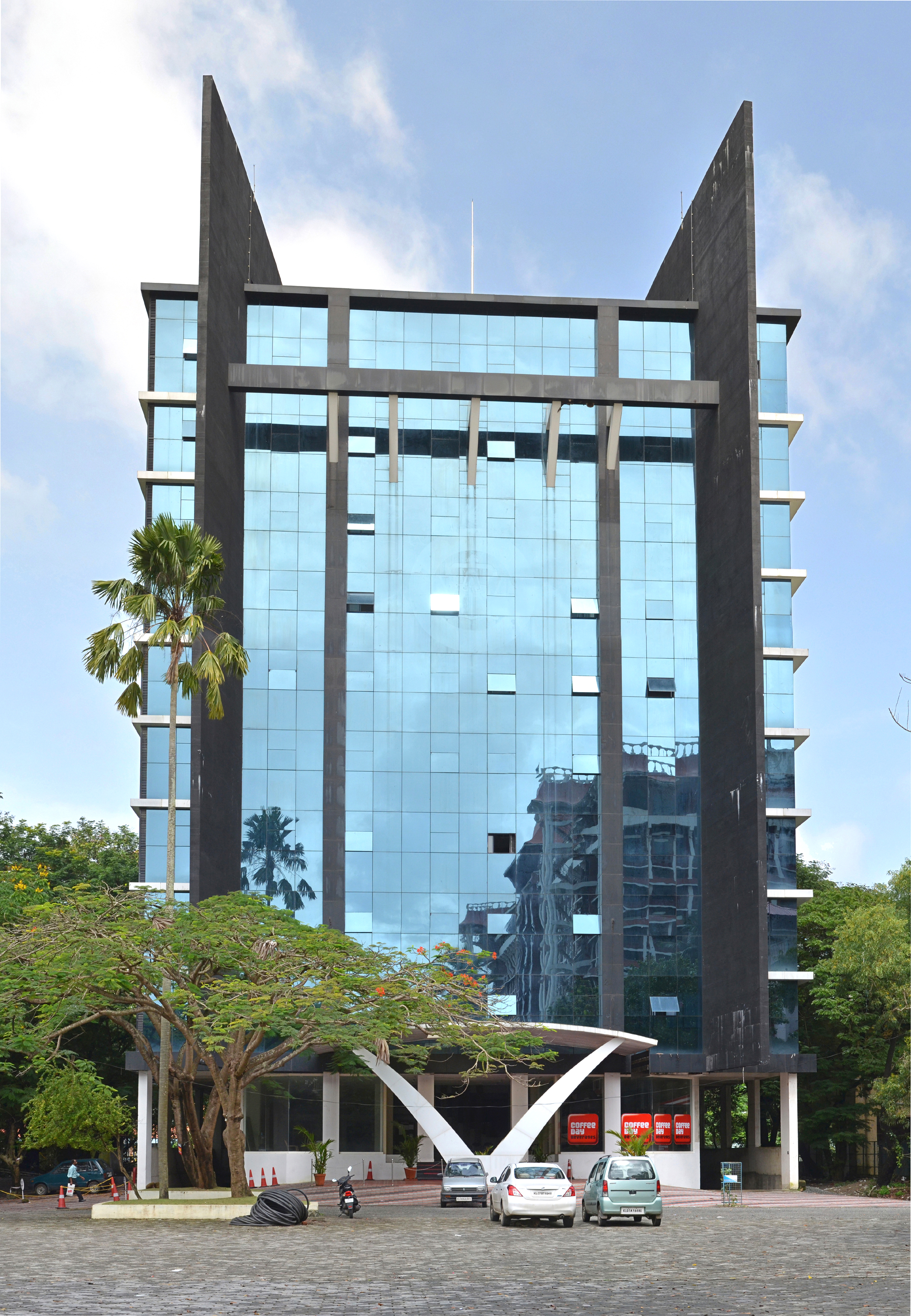
- View of the building

- Location within Kochi

General information
- Architectural style: Modern
- Location: Kochi, India
- Coordinates: 9.9856°N 76.2742°E
- Construction started: 8 November 2008
- Completed: 10 April 2010
- Cost: Rs 200 million
- Client: Kerala High Court Advocates Association

Design and construction
- Architects: Jibu & Thomas

KHCAA Golden Jubilee Chamber Complex is a Chambers building of the Kerala High Court Advocates Association in the city of Kochi in the state of Kerala, India.

== Location ==
It is located in Kochi on the western (sea) side of the Kerala High Court building.

== Construction ==
The foundation stone was laid by the Chief Justice of India, K. G. Balakrishnan on 8 November 2008. Pile foundation was commenced on 23 November 2008, and 120 nos. Reinforced concrete cement piles were completed in 45 days.

Structural Consultant	Geo Structurals
Landscape Consultant	Jayakumar Associates
M.E.P Consultant	Tritech Corporation
Consultant Engineer	S.Devidharan
Site Engineer	K.K.Abdul Rahiman
Piling Contractors	Geo Foundation
Electrical Contractors	Shine Electricals
Fire Fighting Contractors	NIFE & Fire System Pvt.Ltd
False Ceiling Contractors	Royal Decors
Water Proofing Contractors	Prism Enterprises
Texture Work Contractors	Tee Pee Associates
Telecommunication Facility	BSNL FTTH
Lift Contractors	Schindlers India Pvt.Ltd

== Architecture ==
On the eastern and western sides of the building, two fins on each side (with cantilever beams and aerocon blocks in between and texture in black colour) have been provided for aesthetic beauty and structural reasons. On the southern side, a benchmark design in the form of an "A" resting on a projected beam is symbolic of an Advocate's Collar and Band. This building is one of the first fully FTTH enabled buildings in the State of Kerala.

== Facilities ==
- Parking slots for 38 cars
- A conference hall
- Two banks with ATM
- The Chamber Committee office
- Cafeteria
- Reference-cum-cyber library
- 540 impendent chambers
- Fully FTTH-enabled by BSNL
- 3 high-speed modern lifts
- Indian Coffee House

== Safety ==
The building is earthquake resistant. 120 piles of average depth of 43.5 M provide a stable foundation. The lift wall has been provided with double reinforcement. Large number of columns with heavy beams, cross beams and tie beams add safety to the whole structure.
