= Padmanabhan Subramanian Poti =

9th Chief Justice of Gujarat High Court (1983-1985)

Hon'ble Chief Justice P. Subramanian Poti

9th Chief Justice of Gujarat High Court
- In office 28 September 1983 – 1 February 1985
- Nominated by: Y. V. Chandrachud
- Appointed by: Zail Singh
- Preceded by: M. P. Thakkar; P. D. Desai (acting)
- Succeeded by: P. R. Gokulakrishnan; B. K. Mehta (acting)

10th Chief Justice of Kerala High Court
- In office 6 June 1983 – 27 September 1983
- Nominated by: Y. V. Chandrachud
- Appointed by: Zail Singh
- Preceded by: V. Balakrishna Eradi
- Succeeded by: K. Bhaskaran

Judge of Kerala High Court
- In office 20 March 1969 – 5 June 1983; Acting CJ : 29 January 1981 - 5 June 1983
- Nominated by: M. Hidayatullah
- Appointed by: Zakir Husain

Advocate General of Kerala
- In office 15 July 1967 – 19 March 1969
- Appointed by: Bhagwan Sahay
- Succeeded by: M. M. Abdul Khader

Personal details
- Born: 2 February 1923 Trivandrum, India
- Died: February 1998 (aged 75) Kochi, India
- Education: B.Sc and LL.B
- Alma mater: University College Trivandrum; Government Law College, Thiruvananthapuram

Padmanabhan Subramanian Poti (2 February 1923 – February 1998) was a former Chief Justice of the Kerala and Gujarat High Courts in India. After retiring he assisted the Indian People's Tribunal on Environment and Human Rights (IPT).

== Career ==
Poti was born on 2 February 1923 at Thiruvananthapuram, Kerala. He studied at the University College, Thiruvananthapuram, graduating with a degree in Science. He then attended the Government Law College, Thiruvananthapuram where he earned a B.L. degree. In September 1945 he became an Advocate in what was then the High Court of Travancore.

Poti started his career as a junior to U.P. Kakkillya, Advocate General of the State and later Chief Justice. Between 1957 and 1960 he worked part-time for the Government of Kerala as a Law Officer in Taxes. From 1966 to 1970 he served on the Kerala Law Academy as a member of the executive committee. From 1967 to 1969 he was a member of the University of Kerala faculty of law, and as Advocate General of Kerala from 15 July 1967 to 19 March 1969. He was also chairman of the Bar Council of Kerala.

On 20 March 1969 Poti was appointed as additional judge of the Kerala High Court and became permanent on 19 November 1970. On 29 January 1981 he became Acting Chief Justice following elevation of then chief Justice V. Balakrishna Eradi to Supreme Court of India and served in that position until 6 June 1983, when he was confirmed as permanent Chief Justice of the High Court of Kerala. On 28 September 1983 he was transferred to Gujarat High Court as Chief Justice.

== Major rulings ==
P.S. Poti made several significant judgments in favour of the rights of poor people fighting for justice. In January 1985 P.S. Poti gave judgement on an application for government benefits by the families of mill workers who had died while the mills where they worked were closed. The government was arguing that the workers had in effect been dismissed, and were refusing to pay. P.S. Poti said "Merely enacting laws would not be an adequate protection or extension of a necessary benefit. Such laws have to be implemented with a sense of commitment". He found the government liable to pay, liable for all costs and directed the government to pay interest at 12% on the unpaid monies.

P.S. Poti pointed out in 1985 that although the original Indian Constitution prohibits discrimination, an amendment in 1951 empowers the state to make reservation in favor of any disadvantaged group. The question of the legality of reservations for tribal people, scheduled castes, women and other groups is therefore not an issue, assuming the groups are considered disadvantaged. In 1985 P.S. Poti heard a petition from the tribal people of nineteen villages in Gujarat whose land was being flooded by the Sardar Sarovar project. The government claimed it had the right to arbitrarily evict the people. Poti would not rule on the legal issue. He said the matter should be settled out of court and the villagers should receive full compensation.

== Post-retirement ==
After retirement P.S. Poti served on the Indian People's Tribunal on Environmental and Human Rights (IPT), which investigated the Chintapalli Arson Case where police had destroyed tribal hamlets in Visakhapatnam district of Andhra Pradesh. The tribunal released a report on 18 October 1988 which indicted the policemen responsible for the crime and the Andhra Pradesh government for their forest and tribal policies. In 1989, he was elected president of the All India Lawyers Union (AILU).

In 1990, the national government led by the Janata Dal appointed P.S. Poti and P.A. Rosha, a retired officer of the Indian Police Service, to a committee to investigate the events of the 1984 anti-Sikh riots in Delhi. Sajjan Kumar had been accused of being involved in inciting the violence. The Poti-Rosha Committee examined more than 1000 affidavits and 30 cases were recommended for prosecution. The Central Bureau of Investigation tried to arrest Kumar, but he secured anticipatory bail. Both members of the panel resigned in October 1990.

In 1994, the IPT investigated the Rajaji National Park, where the authorities wanted to remove the Gujjars who had traditionally lived in the forest. The tribunal met forest officials, scientists, NGO staff and the Gujjars. P.S. Poti prepared the IPT report, which recommended that the Gujjars be allowed to stay but assisted if they decided to leave. This would require a change to the laws, which specified that no humans could live in a national park. Justice Poti interviewed the many stakeholders, showed the complexity of the issues, and showed that moving the residents out of the forest would not guarantee its survival. His report on the Rajaji National Park provided a model for similar investigations of other protected areas in India.

Padmanabhan Subramanian Poti died in Kochi, Kerala in February 1998 of a heart attack.
