= M. M. Pareed Pillay =

15th Chief Justice of Kerala

Justice M. M. Pareed Pillay
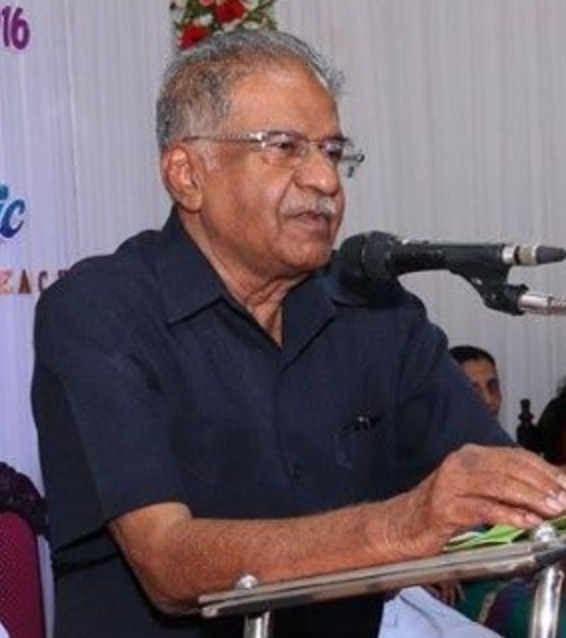
- Justice Pareed Pillay

15th Chief Justice of Kerala High Court
- In office 5 November 1994 – 17 September 1995
- Nominated by: Y. V. Chandrachud
- Appointed by: Zail Singh

Personal details
- Born: Aluva, Kerala, India
- Citizenship: Indian
- Relatives: M. M. Abdul Khader (brother); M. K. Mackar Pillay (uncle)

Manadath Mohammed Pareed Pillay is a retired Indian judge, jurist and lawyer who served as the 15th Chief Justice of Kerala. He was also appointed as the 3rd Kerala Lokayuktha in 2009 and the first Chairman of the Kerala State Human Rights Commission in 1998 by the Governor of Kerala.

== Early life ==
Pareed Pillay was born in Aluva to M. K. Mohammed Pillay, the younger brother of prominent industrialist and philanthropist M. K. Mackar Pillay.

Pillay's brother, M. M. Abdul Khader was a senior advocate of the Supreme Court of India, who also served as the Advocate General of Kerala from 1969 to 1979.
