= C. V. K. Abdul Rehim =

Former Judge of Kerala High Court

Hon'ble Retd. Justice C. V. K. Abdul Rehim
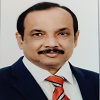

Judge of Kerala High Court
- In office 5 January 2009 – 1 May 2020
- Nominated by: K. G. Balakrishnan
- Appointed by: Pratibha Patil

Personal details
- Born: 2 May 1958 (age 67)

C. V. K. Abdul Rehim (born 2 May 1958) is an Indian judge. He is former Judge of Kerala High Court.

Justice Rehim is known for his historic judgements. During the year 2019 he served as the Acting Chief Justice of Kerala High Court.

== Career ==
He was appointed as Judge of Kerala High Court on 5 January 2009. He has also served as Acting Chief Justice of Kerala High Court. He was retired on 1 May 2020.
