= Alexander Thomas (judge) =

Acting Chief Justice of Kerala High Court

Judge of Kerala High Court
- In office 23 January 2014 – 3 September 2023; Acting Chief: 14 July 2023 – 21 July 2023
- Nominated by: P. Sathasivam
- Appointed by: Pranab Mukherjee

Personal details
- Born: 4 September 1961 (age 65)
- Education: Faculty of Law, University of Delhi
- Website: High Court of Kerala

Alexander Thomas is a retired Indian judge who served as a judge of Kerala High Court, the highest court in the Indian state of Kerala and in the Union Territory of Lakshadweep.

== Education and career ==
Justice Thomas graduated from University College Thiruvananthapuram, obtained post graduation in Physics from Cochin University of Science and Technology, secured law degree from Faculty of Law, University of Delhi and was admitted to the bar in 1988 and started practice. He was appointed as Additional Judge of the High Court of Kerala on 23 January 2014 and became Permanent from 10 March 2016. He was appointed as the Acting Chief Justice on 13 July 2023 and served as Acting Chief Justice till 21.07.2023. Justice Thomas demitted office upon attainment of superannuation on 3 September 2023. He was appointed as chief of Kerala State Human Rights Commission on 24 July 2024.
