= Kerala High Court =

High Court in Kerala, India

High Court of Kerala
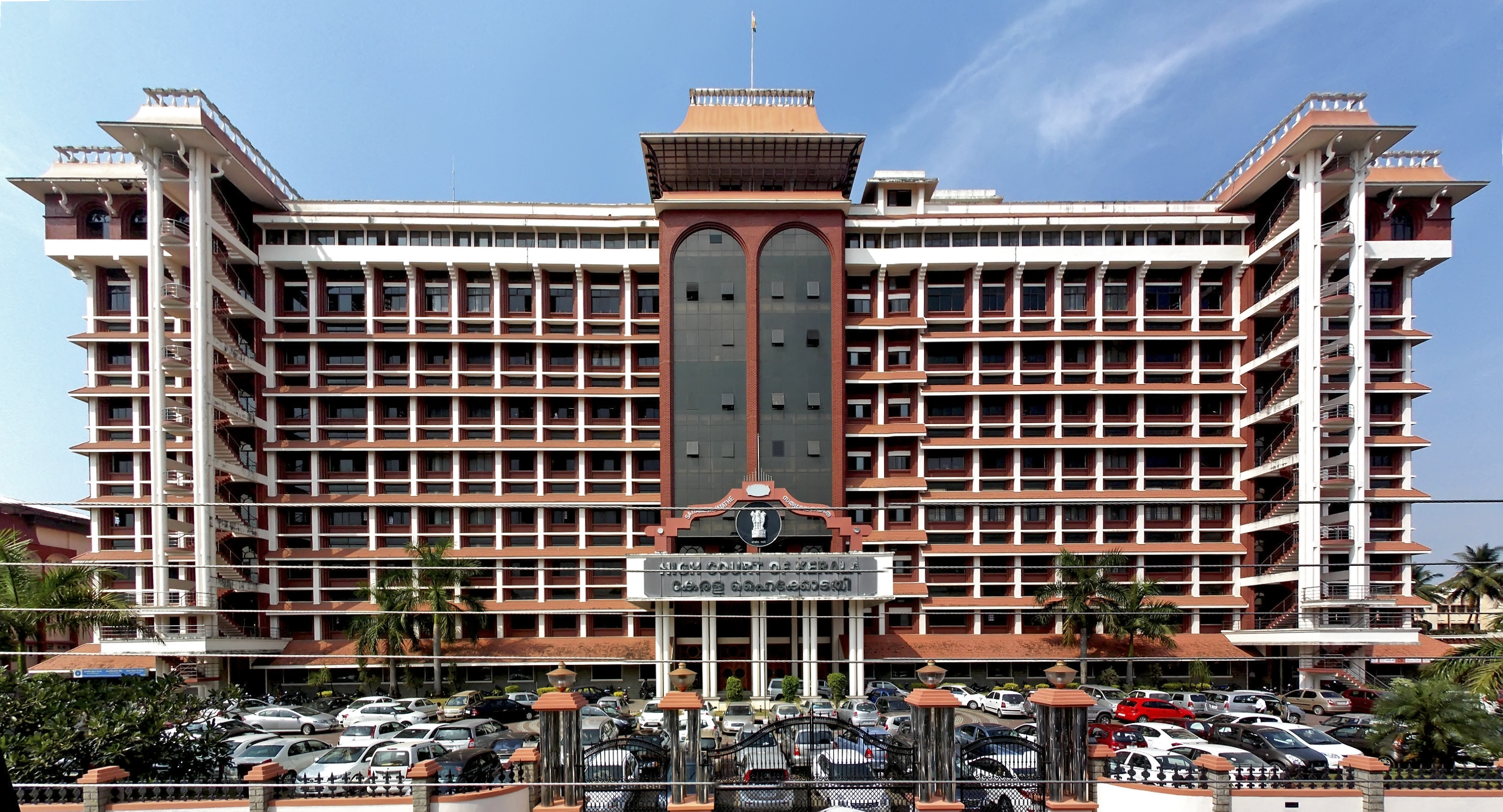
- Interactive map of High Court of Kerala
- 09°59′10″N 76°16′30″E
- Established: 1 November 1956; 70 years ago
- Jurisdiction: Kerala; Lakshadweep (union territory)
- Location: Kochi, Kerala
- Coordinates: 09°59′10″N 76°16′30″E
- Composition method: Presidential with confirmation of Chief Justice of India and Governor of respective state.
- Authorised by: Constitution of India
- Appeals to: Supreme Court of India
- Judge term length: Mandatory retirement by age of 62
- Number of positions: Permanent Judges: 35 (including CJ); Additional Judges: 12
- Website: highcourt.kerala.gov.in

Chief Justice of Kerala
- Currently: Soumen Sen
- Since: 10 January 2026

The High Court of Kerala is the highest court in the Indian state of Kerala and the Union territory of Lakshadweep. It is located in Kochi. Drawing its powers under Article 226 of the Constitution of India, the High Court has the power to issue directions, orders and writs including the writs of habeas corpus, mandamus, prohibition, quo warranto and certiorari for ensuring the enforcement of the Fundamental Rights guaranteed by the Constitution to citizens or for other specified purposes. The High Court is empowered with original, appellate and revisional jurisdiction in civil as well as criminal matters, and the power to answer references to it under some statutes. The High Court has the superintendence and visitorial jurisdiction over all courts and tribunals of subordinate jurisdiction covered under its territorial jurisdiction.

At present, the sanctioned Judge strength of the High Court of Kerala is 35 Permanent Judges including the Chief Justice and 12 Additional Judges. Depending on the importance and nature of the question to be adjudicated, the judges sit as Single (one judge), Division (two judges), Full (three judges) or such other benches of larger strengths.

The foundation stone for the new multi-storied building now housing the High Court of Kerala was laid on 14 March 1994 by the then Chief Justice of India, Justice M. N. Venkatachaliah. The estimated cost of construction was 100 million Indian rupees. The construction was completed in 2005 at a cost of 850 million Indian rupees. The completed High Court building was inaugurated by the Chief Justice of India, Justice Y. K. Sabharwal on 11 February 2006. The new High Court building is equipped with modern amenities like videoconferencing, air conditioned courtrooms, internet, and facilities for retrieval of order copies and publishing of the case status via the internet. The building is built on 5 acres (20,000 m^{2}) of land and has a built-up area of 550,000 square feet (51,000 m^{2}) over nine floors. The building has in it a post office, bank, medical clinic, library, canteens and such other most needed utilities and services. The High Court of Kerala has moved to its new building from the date of its inauguration, from the adjacent palace, where it had been functioning.

== History of judicial system in the State of Kerala ==
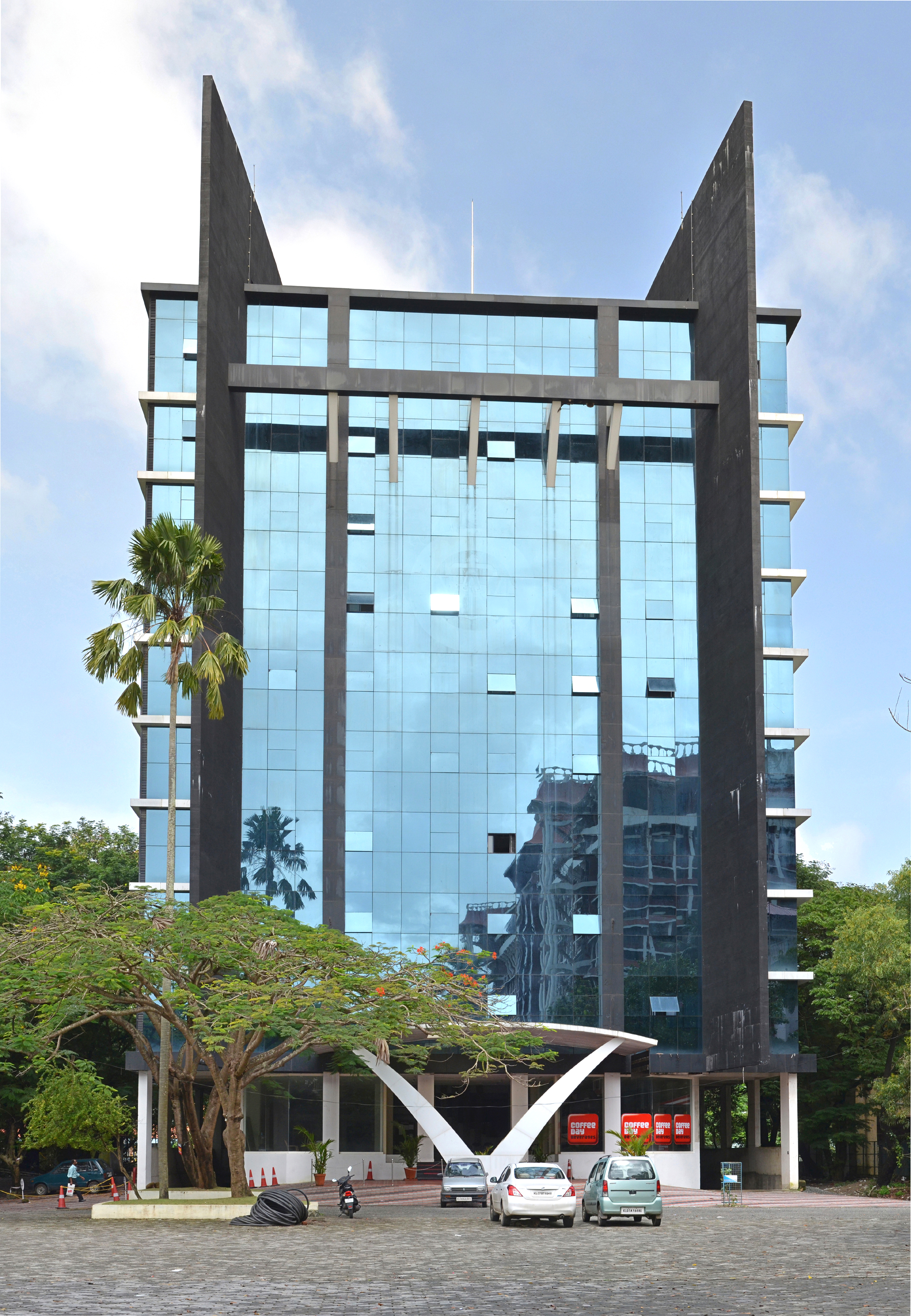
KHCAA Golden Jubilee Chamber Complex

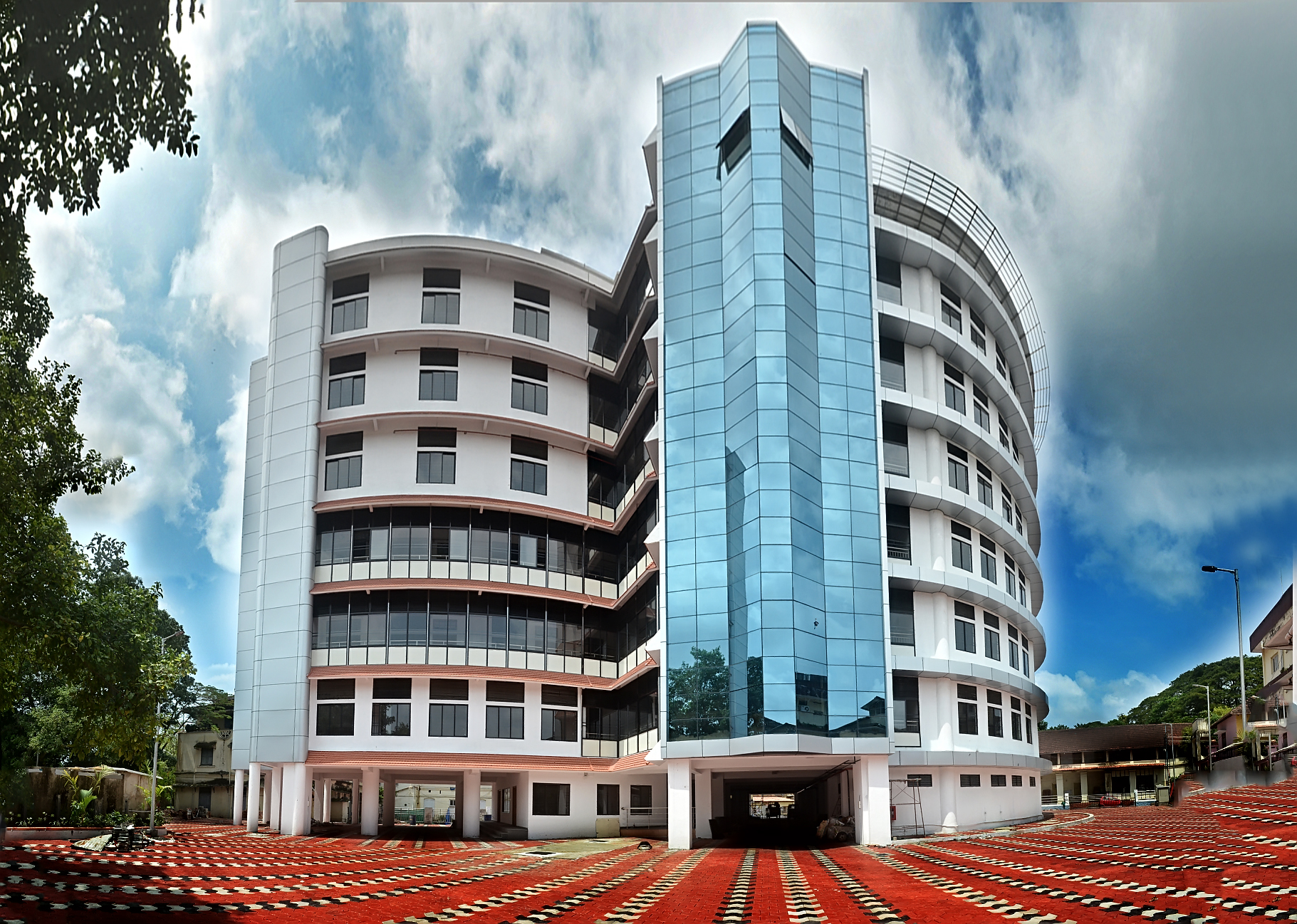
Ernakulam District Court Complex

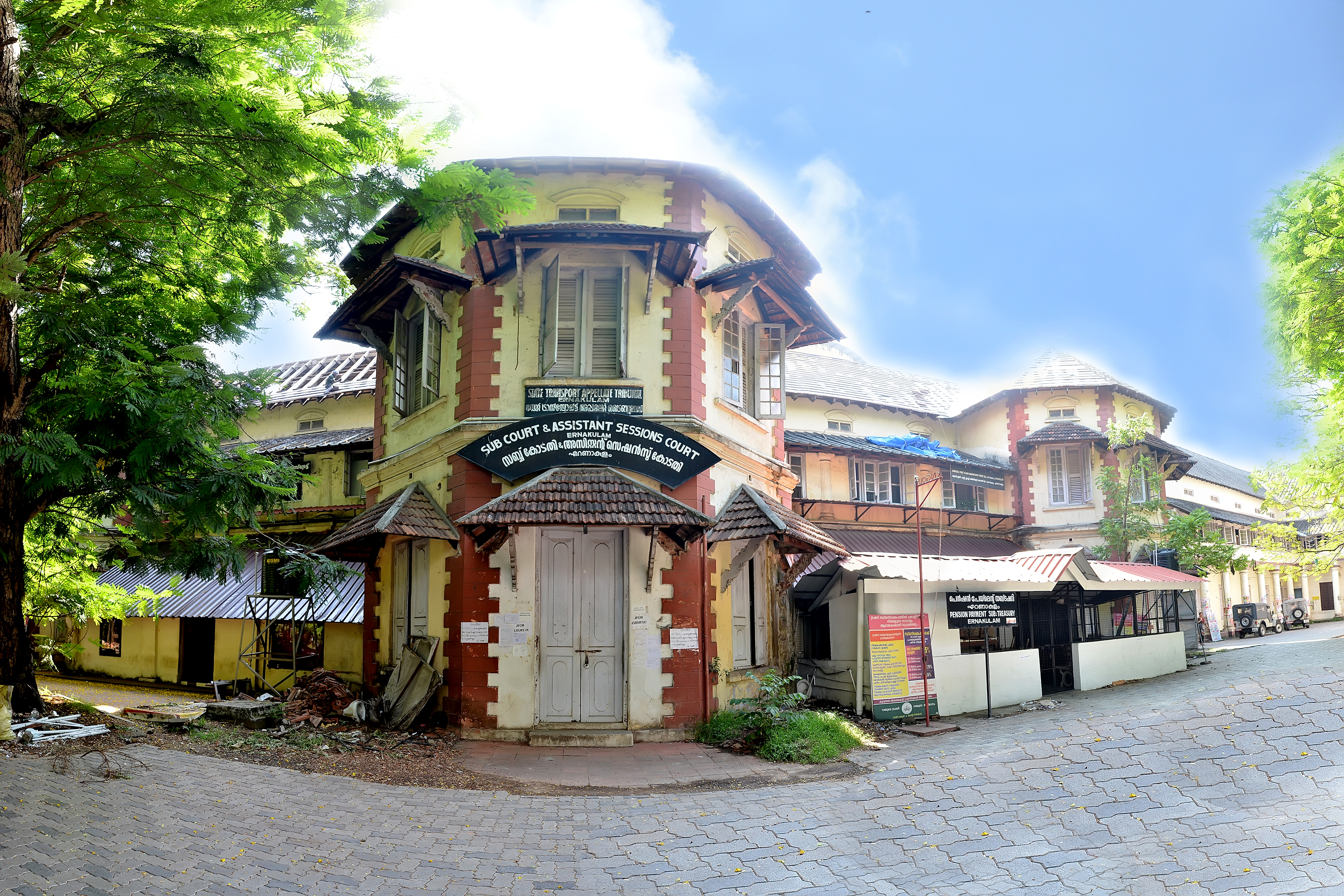
Heritage Building of Ernakulam District Court

The present State of Kerala is result of integrating the erstwhile princely kingdoms of Travancore and Cochin with Malabar district and Kasaragod. The present judicial system in Kerala has its roots dating back to the days of the monarchs of the Kingdoms of Travancore and Cochin.

== Early Reforms in the Kingdom of Travancore and Cochin ==
In 1799, the Kingdom of Travancore became a vassal state of the British Empire. British diplomats encouraged judicial reform as they became involved in the political affairs of Travancore.

In 1811, following the 1808 insurrection against British Cochin and Quilon, Colonel John Munro succeeded Colonel Macaulay as the Resident in Travancore with supervision over the Kingdom of Cochin. Following an investigation into the rampant lawlessness and the abuse of the system, Colonel Munro surveyed the region with his assistant Captain Blacker and established reforms including courts, pensions, and construction of roads, bridges and schools. He functioned as the Diwan until February 1818 when he handed over the reins to Nanjappayya of Coimbatore. Thus it was Colonel Munro who laid the foundations for a systematic legal system, resulting in the present day scenario. Until his time, there were no independent tribunals for the administration of justice.

=== Judicial system in the Kingdom of Travancore ===
In the Kingdom of Travancore, Munro recommended necessary regulations to be passed for the reorganisation of the Courts. These recommendations were accepted by the then king and a Regulation in tune to his recommendations was passed in 1811. Zilla Courts and a Huzur Court were established in the Kingdom of Travancore, in the years 1811 and 1814 respectively. Munro established five zilla (District) courts in A.D 1811 at Padmanabhapuram, Thiruvananthapuram, Mavelikkara, Vaikom and Aluva. Huzur Court, which functioned as the final appellate Court was later replaced by Sadar Court in 1861. Sadar Court, which possessed almost all the powers of the present High Court of Kerala, continued functioning until 1881. Later in 1887, the High Court of Travancore was established with bench strength of five judges. One among the five judges was appointed as the Chief Justice. The judges had the assistance of a Pundit, who acted as an amicus curiae to advise them on the various points of Hindu law. Ramachandra Iyer was appointed as the first Chief Justice.

=== Judicial system in the Kingdom of Cochin ===
In the Kingdom of Cochin, Desavazhis and Naduvazhis were empowered to settle the disputes following the prevailing customary law. More serious matters used to be attended by the monarch himself. In 1812, for the first time in its history, graded law courts were established under the Diwanship of Colonel Munro, in the Kingdom of Cochin. The first Subordinate Courts (Sub Courts) were established by Colonel Munro at Trichur (Thrissur) and Tripunithura. Until 1835, Huzur Court was the final appellate Court. Huzur Court had a bench strength of three judges. Later the Huzur Court was reconstituted as Rajah's Court of Appeal and Subordinate Courts were reconstituted as Zilla Courts. The Zilla Courts were empowered with unlimited jurisdiction, but subject to the confirmation from the Rajah's Court of Appeal. The Rajah's Court of Appeal was reconstituted as the Chief Court of Cochin in 1900. The Chief Court of Cochin had three permanent judges one of whom acted as the Chief Judge. Mr. S. Locke was appointed as the first Chief Judge. Later the Chief Court of Cochin was reconstituted as the High Court, during the Diwanship of Sri Shanmukham Chettiyar.

=== After the integration of Travancore and Cochin kingdoms ===
After India gained her independence on 15 August 1947, the Kingdoms of Travancore and Cochin were integrated to form the Travancore-Cochin State or Thiru-Kochi on 1 July 1949. Later, the High Court of Travancore-Cochin was established at Kochi on 7 July 1949 under the Travancore-Cochin High Court Act (1949). Mr. Puthupally Krishna Pillai was the last Chief Justice of High Court of Travancore-Cochin.

=== Establishment of High Court of Kerala ===
On 1 November 1956, the States Reorganisation Act, 1956 was passed thereby integrating the State of Travancore-Cochin with Malabar district and Kasaragod to form the present State of Kerala. The High Court of Kerala, as it is today was established on 1 November 1956 as the High Court designated for the State of Kerala. The Kerala High Court Act, 1958 defined the jurisdiction and various functions, and powers of the High Court of Kerala. Initially, many cases from both the Travancore-Cochin High Court and the High Court of Madras were transferred to the High Court of Kerala for adjudication. Justice Kaithayil Thomas Koshi was appointed as the first Chief Justice of High Court of Kerala.

== Chief Justice and Judges ==
The current sitting judges of the court are as follows:

== Former Chief Justices ==
Sl No	Name of the Chief Justice	From	To
1	Kaithayil Thomas Koshi	12 September 1944	30 January 1959
2	Kesavan Sankaran	July 1948	29 March 1960
3	Mohammed Ahmed Ansari	29 March 1960	26 November 1961
4	M. S. Menon	29 January 1953	12 June 1969
5	P. T. Raman Nair	22 February 1957	1 September 1971
6	T. C. Raghavan	15 December 1959	21 May 1973
7	Padmanbhapillay Govindan Nair	29 January 1962	3 January 1977
8	V. P. Gopalan Nambiyar	22 March 1965	19 January 1980
9	V. Balakrishna Eradi	5 April 1967	30 January 1981
10	P. Subramanian Poti	20 March 1969	26 September 1983
11	K. Bhaskaran	3 April 1972	9 October 1985
12	V. S. Malimath	24 October 1985	11 June 1991
13	M. Jagannadha Rao	8 August 1991	5 April 1994
14	Sujata Manohar	21 April 1994	4 November 1994
15	M. M. Pareed Pillay	31 January 1985	17 September 1995
16	U. P. Singh	23 July 1996	19 December 1997
17	Om Prakash Verma	20 November 1997	19 March 1999
18	Arijit Pasayat	20 September 1999	8 May 2000
19	Arvind Vinayakarao Savant	30 May 2000	17 September 2000
20	K. K. Usha	30 November 2000	3 July 2001
21	B. N. Srikrishna	6 September 2001	1 October 2002
22	Jawahar Lal Gupta	1 November 2002	22 January 2004
23	N K Sodhi	5 April 2004	17 November 2004
24	B. Subhashan Reddy	21 November 2004	2 March 2005
25	Rajeev Gupta	27 April 2005	11 January 2006
26	Vinod Kumar Bali	22 January 2006	24 January 2007
27	H. L. Dattu	18 May 2007	12 December 2008
28	S. R. Bannurmath	18 March 2009	22 January 2010
29	Jasti Chelameswar	17 March 2010	10 October 2011
30	Manjula Chellur	26 September 2012	5 August 2014
31	Ashok Bhushan	26 March 2015	12 May 2016
32	Mohan Shantanagoudar	22 September 2016	17 February 2017
33	Navniti Prasad Singh	20 March 2017	5 November 2017
34	Antony Dominic	6 February 2018	28 May 2018
35	Hrishikesh Roy	8 August 2018	22 September 2019
36	S. Manikumar	11 October 2019	23 April 2023
37	Sarasa Venkatanarayana Bhatti	1 June 2023	13 July 2023
38	Ashish Jitendra Desai	22 July 2023	4 July 2024
39	Nitin Madhukar Jamdar	26 September 2024	9 January 2026
40	Soumen Sen	10 January 2026	Incumbent

== Judges elevated as Chief Justices ==
This sections contains list of only those judges elevated as chief justices whose parent high court is Kerala. This includes those judges who, at the time of appointment as chief justice, may not be serving in Kerala High Court but this list does not include judges who at the time of appointment as chief justice were serving in Kerala High Court but does not have Kerala as their Parent High Court.

Colour Key

- Female Chief Justice
- Served as Chief Justice of India

Symbol Key

- ^{‡} Elevated to Supreme Court of India
- ^{RES} Resigned
- ^{†} Died in office

Name	Image	Appointed as CJ in HC of	Date of appointment		Date of retirement (Note: this includes date of resignation, death and elevation to supreme court)	Tenure		Ref..
Name	Image	Appointed as CJ in HC of	As Judge	As Chief Justice	Date of retirement	As Chief Justice	As Judge (Note: also includes tenure as Chief Justice)	Ref..
Kaithayil Thomas Koshi		Travancore-Cochin, transferred to Kerala	12 September 1944	26 January 1952	31 January 1959	7 years, 6 days	14 years, 142 days	
Kesavan Sankaran		Kerala	July 1948	2 February 1959	28 March 1960	1 year, 56 days		
Mannathazhath Sankarakutti Menon		Kerala	29 January 1953	26 November 1961	12 June 1969	7 years, 199 days	16 years, 135 days	
Padinharankunnath Thazhathayil Raman Nair		Kerala	22 February 1957	12 June 1969	1 September 1971	2 years, 82 days	14 years, 192 days	
Thoniparambil Chinnan Raghavan		Kerala	15 December 1959	2 September 1971	21 May 1973	1 year, 262 days	13 years, 158 days	
Padmanbhapillay Govindan Nair		Kerala, transferred to Madras	29 January 1962	22 May 1973	28 May 1978	5 years, 7 days	16 years, 120 days	
Vannathankandiyil Puthiyedath Gopalan Nambiyar		Kerala	22 March 1965	3 January 1977	18 January 1980	3 years, 16 days	14 years, 303 days	
Vettath Balakrishna Eradi		Kerala	5 April 1967	19 January 1980	29 January 1981^{[‡]}	1 year, 11 days	13 years, 300 days	
Padmanabhan Subramanian Poti		Kerala, transferred to Gujarat	20 March 1969	6 June 1983	1 February 1985	1 year, 127 days	15 years, 319 days	
Vazhakkulangarayil Khalid		Jammu & Kashmir	3 April 1972	24 August 1983	24 June 1984^{[‡]}	306 days	12 years, 83 days	
Kattali Bhaskaran		Kerala, transferred to Andhra Pradesh	3 April 1972	21 March 1985	18 March 1988	2 years, 364 days	15 years, 351 days	
Perumbulavil Chakkala Valappil Balakrishna Menon		Himachal Pradesh	18 September 1980	6 November 1989	14 January 1991	1 year, 70 days	10 years, 119 days	
Ullal Lakshminarayana Bhat		Gauhati, transferred to Madhya Pradesh	18 September 1980	20 August 1991	13 October 1995	4 years, 55 days	15 years, 26 days	
Krishnaswami Sundara Paripoornan		Patna	23 December 1982	24 January 1994	10 June 1994^{[‡]}	141 days	11 years, 170 days	
Manadath Mohammed Pareed Pillay		Kerala	31 January 1985	5 November 1994	17 September 1995	317 days	10 years, 230 days	
Kumaran Sreedharan		Punjab & Haryana, transferred to Gujarat	10 September 1985	30 July 1996	4 June 1998	1 year, 310 days	12 years, 268 days	
Konakuppakatil Gopinathan Balakrishnan		Gujarat, transferred to Madras	26 September 1985	16 July 1998	7 June 2000^{[‡]}	1 year, 328 days	14 years, 256 days	
Karinchet Kumaran Usha		Kerala	25 February 1991	30 November 2000	2 July 2001	215 days	10 years, 128 days	
Perubhemba Krishna Ayer Balasubramanyan		Orissa, transferred to Jharkhand	4 June 1992	5 December 2001	26 August 2004^{[‡]}	2 years, 266 days	12 years, 84 days	
Cyriac Joseph		Uttarakhand, transferred to Karnataka	6 July 1994	20 March 2005	6 July 2008^{[‡]}	3 years, 109 days	14 years, 1 day	
Kalavamkodath Sivasankara Panicker Radhakrishnan		Jammu & Kashmir, transferred to Gujarat	17 May 1995	7 January 2008	16 November 2009^{[‡]}	1 year, 314 days	14 years, 184 days	
Jacob Benjamin Koshy		Patna	17 January 1996	16 March 2009	12 May 2009	58 days	13 years, 116 days	
Kurian Joseph		Himachal Pradesh	12 July 2000	8 February 2010	7 March 2013^{[‡]}	3 years, 28 days	12 years, 239 days	
Pius Chakkalayil Kuriakose		Sikkim	9 September 2002	28 March 2013	1 October 2013	188 days	11 years, 23 days	
Kuttiyil Mathew Joseph		Uttarakhand	14 October 2004	31 July 2014	6 August 2018^{[‡]}	4 years, 7 days	13 years, 297 days	
Thottathil Bhaskaran Nair Radhakrishnan		Chhattisgarh, transferred to Telangana then to Calcutta	14 October 2004	18 March 2017	28 April 2021	4 years, 42 days	16 years, 197 days	
Antony Dominic		Kerala	30 January 2007	9 February 2018	30 May 2018	111 days	11 years, 121 days	
Parappillil Ramakrishnan Nair Ramachandra Menon		Chhattisgarh	5 January 2009	6 May 2019	31 May 2021	2 years, 26 days	12 years, 147 days	
Krishnan Vinod Chandran		Patna	8 November 2011	29 March 2023	15 January 2025^{[‡]}	1 year, 293 days	13 years, 68 days	
Muhamed Mustaque Ayumantakath		Sikkim	23 January 2014	4 January 2026	Incumbent	317 days	12 years, 298 days	

=== Judges appointed as Acting Chief Justice ===
Name	Appointed as ACJ in HC of	Date of appointment as Judge	Period as Acting Chief Justice	Date of retirement	Tenure as ACJ	Tenure as Judge	Remarks	Ref..
P. S. Poti	Kerala	20 March 1969	29 Jan 1981 – 5 Jun 1983	1 February 1985	2 years, 127 days	15 years, 319 days	Became permanent	
K. Bhaskaran	Kerala	3 April 1972	28 Sep 1983 – 20 Mar 1985	18 March 1988	1 year, 174 days	15 years, 351 days	Became permanent	
T. K. Thommen	Kerala	9 May 1975	9 Oct 1985 – 24 Oct 1985	13 December 1988^{[‡]}	16 days	13 years, 219 days	--	
U. L. Bhat	Kerala	18 September 1980	11 Jun 1991 – 7 Aug 1991	13 October 1995	58 days	15 years, 26 days	--	
Varghese Kalliath	Kerala	11 June 1984	6 Apr 1994 – 20 Apr 1994	4 May 1994	15 days	9 years, 328 days	--	
K. T. Thomas	Kerala	12 August 1985	18 Sep 1995 – 26 Mar 1996	26 March 1996^{[‡]}	191 days	10 years, 230 days	Elevated to Supreme Court	
K. Sreedharan	Kerala	10 September 1985	27 Mar 1996 – 22 Jul 1996	4 June 1998	118 days	12 years, 268 days	--	
K. G. Balakrishnan	Gujarat	26 September 1985	4 Jun 1998 – 15 Jul 1998	7 June 2000^{[‡]}	42 days	14 years, 256 days	Became permanent	
G. Rajasekharan	Kerala	23 November 1989	20 Mar 1999 – 23 May 1999	23 May 1999	65 days	9 years, 182 days	Retired as ACJ	
K. K. Usha	Kerala	25 February 1991	28 May 2000 – 29 May 2000	2 July 2001	2 days	10 years, 128 days	--	
K. K. Usha	Kerala	25 February 1991	17 Sep 2000 – 29 Nov 2000	2 July 2001	74 days	10 years, 128 days	Became permanent	
P. K. Balasubramanyan	Kerala	4 June 1992	3 Jul 2001 – 6 Sep 2001	26 August 2004^{[‡]}	66 days	12 years, 84 days	--	
Kaladiparambil Narayana Kurup	Madras	20 October 1992	31 Aug 2001 – 11 Sep 2001	13 December 2001	12 days	9 years, 55 days	--	
Cyriac Joseph	Kerala	6 July 1994	2 Oct 2002 – 1 Nov 2002	6 July 2008^{[‡]}	31 days	14 years, 1 day	--	
Cyriac Joseph	Kerala	6 July 1994	18 Nov 2004 – 20 Nov 2004	6 July 2008^{[‡]}	3 days	14 years, 1 day	--	
Cyriac Joseph	Kerala	6 July 1994	2 Mar 2005 – 18 Mar 2005	6 July 2008^{[‡]}	17 days	14 years, 1 day	Elevated as CJ of Uttarakhand	
K. S. Radhakrishnan	Kerala	17 May 1995	19 Mar 2005 – 26 Apr 2005	16 November 2009^{[‡]}	39 days	14 years, 184 days	--	
K. S. Radhakrishnan	Kerala	17 May 1995	11 Jan 2006 – 21 Jan 2006	16 November 2009^{[‡]}	11 days	14 years, 184 days	--	
K. S. Radhakrishnan	Kerala	17 May 1995	24 Jan 2007 – 17 May 2007	16 November 2009^{[‡]}	114 days	14 years, 184 days	--	
J. B. Koshy	Kerala	17 January 1996	16 Dec 2008 – 13 Mar 2009	12 May 2009	58 days	13 years, 116 days	Elevated as CJ of Patna	
Kurian Joseph	Kerala	12 July 2000	14 Mar 2009 – 17 Mar 2009	7 March 2013^{[‡]}	4 days	12 years, 239 days	--	
Kurian Joseph	Kerala	12 July 2000	23 Jan 2010 – 5 Feb 2010	7 March 2013^{[‡]}	14 days	12 years, 239 days	Elevated as CJ of Himachal Pradesh	
Puthucode Ramaswamy Raman	Kerala	7 September 2001	6 Feb 2010 – 16 Mar 2010	14 May 2010	39 days	8 years, 250 days	--	
Charnethu Narayana PiIlai Ramachandran Nair	Kerala	7 September 2001	10 Oct 2011 – 8 Nov 2011	1 October 2012	30 days	11 years, 25 days	--	
T. B. Radhakrishnan	Kerala	14 October 2004	13 May 2016 – 31 Jul 2016	28 April 2021	80 days	16 years, 197 days	--	
T. B. Radhakrishnan	Kerala	14 October 2004	16 Feb 2017 – 17 Mar 2017	28 April 2021	30 days	16 years, 197 days	Elevated as CJ of Chhattisgarh	
Antony Dominic	Kerala	30 January 2007	17 Mar 2017 – 20 Mar 2017	30 May 2018	4 days	11 years, 121 days	--	
Antony Dominic	Kerala	30 January 2007	6 Nov 2017 – 8 Feb 2018	30 May 2018	95 days	11 years, 121 days	Became permanent	
C. K. Abdul Rehim	Kerala	5 January 2009	22 Sep 2019 – 11 Oct 2019	2 May 2020	20 days	11 years, 119 days	--	
Alexander Thomas	Kerala	23 January 2014	14 Jul 2023 – 21 Jul 2023	3 September 2023	8 days	9 years, 224 days	--	
A. M. Mustaque	Kerala	23 January 2014	5 Jul 2024 – 25 Sep 2024	Incumbent	83 days	12 years, 298 days	--	

== Judges elevated to Supreme Court ==
This section includes the list of only those judges whose parent high court was Kerala. This includes those judges who, at the time of elevation to Supreme Court of India, may not be serving in Kerala High Court but this list does not include judges who at the time of elevation were serving in Kerala High Court but does not have Kerala as their Parent High Court.

Colour Key

- Female Judge
- Served as Chief Justice of India

Symbol Key

- ^{RES} Resigned
- ^{†} Died in office

#	Name of the Judge	Image	Date of Appointment		Date of Retirement	Tenure			Immediately preceding office
#	Name of the Judge	Image	In Parent High Court	In Supreme Court	Date of Retirement	In High Court(s)	In Supreme Court	Total tenure (Note: Includes both tenure as High Court Judge as well as Supreme Court Judge)	Immediately preceding office
1	Chittur Anantakrishna Iyer Vaidyialingam		27 March 1957	10 October 1966	29 June 1972	9 years, 197 days	5 years, 264 days	15 years, 95 days	Judge of Kerala HC
2	Kuttyil Kurien Mathew		5 June 1962	4 October 1971	2 January 1976	9 years, 121 days	4 years, 91 days	13 years, 212 days	Judge of Kerala HC
3	Vaidyanathapuram Rama Krishna Iyer		12 July 1968	17 July 1973	14 November 1980	5 years, 5 days	7 years, 121 days	12 years, 126 days	Judge of Kerala HC
4	Vettath Balakrishna Eradi		5 April 1967	30 January 1981	18 June 1987	13 years, 300 days	6 years, 140 days	20 years, 75 days	9th CJ of Kerala HC
5	Vazhakkulangarayil Khalid		3 April 1972	25 June 1984	30 June 1987	12 years, 83 days	3 years, 6 days	15 years, 89 days	13th CJ of Jammu & Kashmir HC
6	Thamarappallil Kochu Thommen		9 May 1975	14 December 1988	25 September 1993	13 years, 219 days	4 years, 286 days	18 years, 140 days	Judge of Kerala HC
7	Fathima Beevi		4 August 1983	6 October 1989 (Note: Retired as High Court Judge on 29 April 1989 before being elevated to Supreme Court of India)	29 April 1992	5 years, 264 days	2 years, 207 days	8 years, 106 days	--
8	Krishnaswami Sundara Paripoornan		23 December 1982	11 June 1994	11 June 1997	11 years, 170 days	3 years, 1 day	14 years, 171 days	25th CJ of Patna HC
9	Thomas Kallupurackal Thomas		12 August 1985	29 March 1996	30 January 2002	10 years, 230 days	5 years, 308 days	16 years, 172 days	Acting CJ of Kerala HC
10	Konakuppakatil Gopinathan Balakrishnan		26 September 1985	8 June 2000	12 May 2010	14 years, 256 days	9 years, 339 days	24 years, 229 days	29th CJ of Madras HC
11	Perubhemba Krishna Ayer Balasubramanyan		4 June 1992	27 August 2004	27 August 2007	12 years, 84 days	3 years, 1 day	15 years, 85 days	2nd CJ of Jharkhand HC
12	Cyriac Joseph		6 July 1994	7 July 2008	27 January 2012	14 years, 1 day	3 years, 205 days	17 years, 206 days	23rd CJ of Karnataka HC
13	Kalavamkodath Sivasankara Panicker Radhakrishnan		17 May 1995	17 November 2009	14 May 2014	14 years, 184 days	4 years, 179 days	18 years, 350 days	21st CJ of Gujarat HC
14	Kurian Joseph		12 July 2000	8 March 2013	29 November 2018	12 years, 239 days	5 years, 267 days	18 years, 141 days	20th CJ of Himachal Pradesh HC
15	Kuttiyil Mathew Joseph		14 October 2004	7 August 2018	16 June 2023	13 years, 297 days	4 years, 314 days	18 years, 246 days	9th CJ of Uttarakhand HC
16	Chudalayil Thevan Ravikumar		5 January 2009	31 August 2021	5 January 2025	12 years, 238 days	3 years, 128 days	16 years, 1 day	Judge of Kerala HC
17	Krishnan Vinod Chandran		8 November 2011	16 January 2025	Incumbent	13 years, 68 days	1 year, 305 days	15 years, 8 days	44th CJ of Patna HC

== Controversy ==
The High Court of Kerala building in Kochi had not assigned Number 13 to any of its courtrooms due to triskaidekaphobia. This created a controversy in Kerala as the state prides itself on being the most literate in India. A petitioner questioned this in Kerala High Court itself whether it was due to superstitious beliefs, as the room numbering skipped from 12 to 14. After hearing this petition, the High Court not only dismissed it, but imposed a fine of ₹10,000 (US$110) on the petitioner. Later, the Supreme Court of India over-ruled the High Court's decision admonishing the encouragement of superstitions saying that "The High Court is an institution. It should not be allowed to encourage this sort of superstitions".

Kerala Legislative Assembly passed resolution for setting up a high court bench at Thiruvananthapuram, capital city of Kerala. The Union Government and the Supreme Court are favourable in sanctioning more high court benches in country, and had already sanctioned many in other states. However, a new high court bench at Thiruvananthapuram is still pending, due to opposition by some in the high court at Kochi. The opposition is based on the rationale that when the United State of Travancore-Cochin (the forerunner to the State of Kerala) was created, it was agreed that its capital would be Thiruvananthapuram, where the legislature and the executive would be based, but that the judiciary would be based in Kochi, Cochin's capital.

== See also ==
- High Courts of India
- KHCAA Golden Jubilee Chamber Complex

How To Check Kerala High Court Case Status Online?
