= E-Jagriti =

Indian digital consumer protection platform

E-Jagriti is an online digital consumer protection platform in India. It is the successor of the portal E-Daakhil, which was launched by the Indian The National Consumer Disputes Redressal Commission (NCDRC) in September 2020 for facilitation of offline and online complaints relating to the Consumer Protection Act, 2019 by consumers.

== History and objectives ==
E-Daakhil was launched on 7 September 2020 by The National Consumer Disputes Redressal Commission (NCDRC) for online and offline filing of complaints by aggrieved consumers and also facilitates of digital payments related to it. Over the following years the portal became available in multiple Indian states including Rajasthan, Meghalaya, and Sikkim.

By November 2021, 9800 complaints had been lodged in the E-Daakhil portal across various consumer commissions of India.

On 1 January 2025, the e-Daakhil portal along with OCMS, CMS, and Confonet applications were integrated into E-Jagriti, which is available in all states and union territories of India.

== See also ==
- State Consumer Disputes Redressal Commission
