= Central Consumer Protection Authority =

Regulatory authority in New Delhi, India

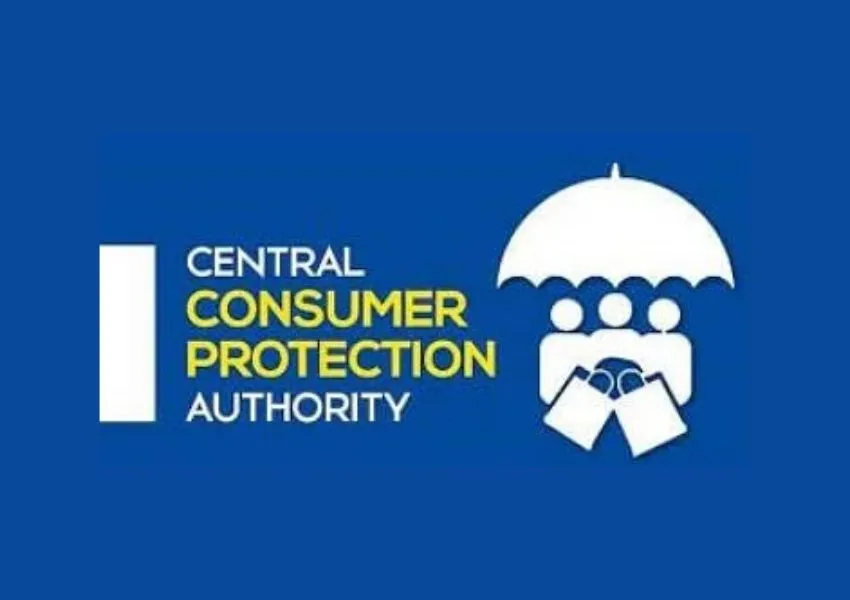
- Formation: 2019
- Type: Regulatory Body
- Legal status: Active
- Headquarters: New Delhi, India
- Owner: Ministry of Consumer Affairs, Government of India
- Website: consumeraffairs.nic.in/acts-and-rules/consumer-protection

Central Consumer Protection Authority is a regulatory authority set up under Section 10(1) of the Consumer Protection Act, 2019 in relation to matters affecting rights of consumers by individuals or entities following improper trade practices or by display of inappropriate or wrong advertisements affecting public interest and helps promoting consumer trust by enforcing the rights of consumers through effective guidelines.

== History and Objective ==
Central Consumer Protection Authority replaced the previous The Consumer Protection Act, 1986 and is formed as per The Consumer Protection Act, 2019. The new act has been incorporated with additional consumer concerns like treating misleading advertisements and providing wrong information regarding quality or quantity of goods or provision of services as an offence.

== Composition ==
Central Consumer Protection Authority shall consist of following members appointed by Central Government.

1. Chief Commissioner

2. Two Commissioners. One commissioner each will represent for goods and services.

Nidhi Khare is current Chief Commissioner of Central Consumer Protection Authority.

== Powers ==
Central Consumer Protection Authority has the following powers:

(i) If the commission finds violations of rights of consumers or in notice of trade practices which is unfair it can inquire or cause an inquiry, either on receipt of complaint or suo moto or as directed by Central Government.

(ii) If the commission finds after preliminary inquiry of an existence of a prima facie case of consumer rights violation or it is in notice of any unfair trade practice or any wrong or inaccurate advertisement which is prejudicial to public interest or to the interests of the consumers, it can order an investigation by the District Collector or by Director General.

(iii) If the commission finds prima facie of a person involved in violation of consumer rights or following any unfair trade practice or making any false or inaccurate advertisement as described above, it can call upon the person involved and can direct him to produce any document or record in his possession relating to it. In addition, the District Collector or Director General under the Code of Criminal Procedure,1973 has powers of search and seizure, and authority to ask submission of any record or document.

(iv) The commission can direct recalling of any dangerous, hazardous or unsafe goods or withdrawal of similar services and order refunding of the proceeds collected towards sale of goods or offering of services so recalled or order stoppage of any unfair practices after giving the person directed to do so, an opportunity of being heard.

(v) The commission can involve in and engage in services relating to consumer advocacy by offering services of registering complaints before the National Commission, the State Commission, or the District Commission, formed as per the Act, involving in the proceedings before them, suggesting remedial actions, involving itself in related research, creating awareness and guiding consumers on safety precautions.

(vi) The commission can direct to a trader or manufacturer or endorser or advertiser or publisher after investigation to discontinue advertisements which are wrong or misleading or prejudicial to consumers, and in such case impose penalties up to Rs 10 lakhs payable in cash.

(vii) The commission can also prevent the endorser of advertisement which is wrong or misleading from making the same in relation to any product or service for a time period ranging up to one year, and three years in case of subsequent contravention.

== See also ==
- Consumer Protection Act, 2019
