= Consumer Protection Act, 1986 =

Consumer protection legislation in India

Parliament of India
- Long title: An Act to provide for the better protection of the interests of consumers and for that purpose to make provision for the establishment of consumer councils and other authorities for the settlement of consumers' disputes and for matters connected therewith.
- Citation: Act No. 68 of 1986
- Territorial extent: Whole of India except the State of Jammu and Kashmir
- Enacted by: Parliament of India
- Enacted: 24 December 1986
- Assented to by: President Zail Singh
- Assented to: 24 December 1986
- Commenced: Chapter I, II, IV on 15 April 1987; Chapter III on 1 July 1987
- Repealed: 20 July 2020 and 24 July 2020

Amended by
- Consumer Protection (Amendment) Act, 1991; Consumer Protection (Amendment) Act, 1993; Consumer Protection (Amendment) Act, 2002

Repealed by
- Consumer Protection Act, 2019
- Status: Repealed

The Consumer Protection Act, 1986 (COPRA) was an Act by the Parliament of India aimed at protecting the interests of consumers in India. It was replaced by the Consumer Protection Act, 2019. It was made for the establishment of consumer councils and other authorities for the settlement of consumer's dispute and matters connected with it.

== History ==
Consumer rights in India were historically overlooked, leading to exploitation of consumers by businesses. This necessitated the creation of a robust legislation to protect consumers from unfair practices, hence the 'Consumer Protection Act, 1986' was introduced. This act was introduced under slogan Jago Grahak Jago.

== Significance ==
This Act is regarded as the 'Magna Carta' in the field of consumer protection for checking unfair trade practices, ‘defects in goods’ and ‘deficiencies in services’. It has led to the establishment of a widespread network of consumer forums and appellate courts all over India. It has significantly impacted how businesses approach consumers and have empowered consumers to a greater extent.

== Consumer Protection Council ==
Consumer Protection Councils are established at the national, state and district level to increase consumer awareness. They guide consumers on how to file cases in the Consumer Disputes Redressal Commissions.

=== Various Consumer Organizations ===
To increase the awareness of consumers, there are many consumer organisation and NGOs that have been established. Consumer Guidance Society of India (CGSI) was the first consumer organisation established in India in 1966; It was followed by many others such as:

- Consumer Education And Research Centre (Gujarat)
- Bureau Of Indian Standards
- Federation Of Consumer Organisation In Tamil Nadu
- Mumbai Grahak Panchayat
- Consumer Voice (New Delhi)
- Legal Aid Society (Kolkata)
- Akhil Bhartiya Grahak Panchayat
- The Consumers Eye India.
- United India Consumer's Association.
- All India Consumer Welfare Council (AICWC)
- Consumer Protection Council Tamil Nadu

== Consumer Disputes Redressal Agencies ==
- District Consumer Disputes Redressal Commission (DCDRC): Also known as the "District Commission" is established by the State Government in each district of the State. The State Governments may establish more than one District Forum in a district. It is a district-level court that deals with cases valuing up to ₹10 million (US$110,000).
- State Consumer Disputes Redressal Commission (SCDRC): Also known as the "State Commission" established by the State Government in the State. It is a state-level court that takes up cases valuing less than ₹10 million (US$110,000)
- National Consumer Disputes Redressal Commission (NCDRC): Established by the Central Government. It deals with matters of more than ₹10 million.

== Objectives of the central council ==
The objectives of the Central Council are to promote and protect the rights of the consumers such as:-

1. The right to be protected against the marketing of goods and services which are hazardous to life and property.
2. The right to be informed about the quality, quantity, potency, purity, standard and price of goods or services, as the case may be to protect the consumer against unfair trade practices;
3. The right to be assured, wherever possible, access to a variety of goods and services at competitive prices;
4. The right to be heard and to be assured that consumer's interest will receive due consideration at appropriate forums;
5. The right to seek redressal against unfair trade practices or restrictive trade practices or unscrupulous exploitation of consumers
6. The right to consumer education
7. The right to consumer protection

== Jurisdiction/Three Tier System of Council Courts ==
=== Jurisdiction of District Forum ===
1. Subject to the other provisions of this Act, the District Forum shall have jurisdiction to entertain complaints where the value of the goods or services and the compensation, if any, claimed does not exceed rupees one crore.
2. A complaint shall be instituted in a District Forum within the local limits of whose jurisdiction:-

a) – the opposite party or each of the opposite parties, where there are more than one, at the time of the institution of the complaint, actually and voluntarily resides or carries on business or has a branch office or personally works for gain, or
b) – any of the opposite parties, where there are more than one, at the time of the institution of the complaint, actually and voluntarily resides, or carries on business or has a branch office, or personally works for gain, provided that in such case either the permission of the District Forum is given, or the opposite parties who do not reside, or carry on business or have a branch office, or personally work for gain, as the case may be, acquiesce in such institution; or
c) – the cause of action, wholly or in part, arises.

Consumer courts do not have jurisdiction over matters where services or goods were bought for a commercial purpose.

=== Jurisdiction of State Commission ===
Subject to the other provisions of this Act, the State Commission shall have jurisdiction:-

a) to entertain :

i) complaints where the value of the goods or services and compensation, if any, claimed exceeds rupees one crore but does not exceed rupees ten crore; and
ii) appeals against the orders of any District Forum within the State; and

b) to call for the records and pass appropriate orders in any consumer dispute

=== Jurisdiction of National Commission ===
(a) to entertain—

(i) complaints where the value of the goods or services and compensation, if any, claimed exceeds rupees ten crore; and

(ii) appeals against the orders of any State mayor; and

(b) to call for the records and pass appropriate orders in any consumer dispute which is pending before or has been decided by any State Commission. However, the Supreme Court of India has held that the jurisdiction of National Commission under Revision Jurisdiction is very limited and can only be exercised when State Commission exceeds its jurisdiction, fails to exercise its jurisdiction or there is material illegality in the order passed by State Commission.
