= Consumer Protection Act, 2019 =

Act of the Parliament of India

Parliament of India
- Long title: An Act to provide for protection of the interests of consumers and for the said purpose, to establish authorities for timely and effective administration and settlement of consumers' disputes and for matters connected therewith or incidental thereto.
- Citation: Act No. 35 of 2019
- Territorial extent: India
- Passed by: Lok Sabha
- Passed: 30 July 2019
- Passed by: Rajya Sabha
- Passed: 6 August 2019
- Assented to by: President Ram Nath Kovind
- Assented to: 9 August 2019
- Commenced: 20 July 2020 and 24 July 2020

Legislative history

Initiating chamber: Lok Sabha
- Bill title: The Consumer Protection Bill, 2019
- Bill citation: Bill No. 144 of 2019
- Introduced by: Ram Vilas Paswan
- Introduced: 8 July 2019
- Passed: 30 July 2019

Revising chamber: Rajya Sabha
- Passed: 6 August 2019

Repeals
- Consumer Protection Act, 1986
- Status: In force (amended)

The Consumer Protection Act, 2019 is an Act of the Parliament of India. It repeals and replaces the Consumer Protection Act, 1986.

== Introduction ==
The Consumer Protection Act, 2019 was introduced in the Lok Sabha as a replacement of COPRA, 1986 on 8 July 2019 by the Minister of Consumer Affairs, Food and Public Distribution, Ram Vilas Paswan. It was passed by Lok Sabha on 30 July 2019 and later passed in Rajya Sabha on 6 August 2019.

The bill received assent from the President Ram Nath Kovind on 9 August, and was notified in The Gazette of India on the same date. The Act came into effect by 20 July 2020, while certain other provisions of the Act like establishing the Central Consumer Protection Authority came into effect from 24 July 2020.

The Act focuses on giving customer more power by taking transparency to another level. In September 2020 government declared a new draft known as advertising code which gives customer protection against false advertisements.

== Provisions ==
The Consumer Protection Act has made it mandatory for every e-commerce entity to display the country of origin.

== Councils, Authorities and Commissions established ==
This act is also focused on continuing the formally defined institutions created by the COPRA,1986 to take up cases and decisions related to consumer protection. It allows the central government to move away the burden of establishing consumer protection laws from the parliament and the burden of litigation from the courts; by providing an alternate pathway for the governments and citizens alike to approach, deliberate, discuss and decide on matters related to consumer protection in the interest of consumers.

=== Consumer Protection Authority (Body) ===
This act also allows for the establishment of independent statutory authority bodies on both the levels of the centre and the state to have jurisdiction over consumer protection law and cases. These bodies have a wide range of powers, including but not limited to search and seizure, declaration of judgements, protection of good-faith decisions. These bodies have formal internal structure with their own investigative wing to conduct research into a particular case.

They have the right to recall goods, refer the matter to other regulators for investigating a case on all fronts, to issue directions and penalties against false or misleading advertisements.

=== Consumer Disputes Redressal Commission (Body) ===
This act allows for the creation of commissions to which consumers can approach and place their concerns on the levels of the district, state, and centre. They function in a manner similar to the courts, and have complete jurisdiction over declaration of case judgements. Their function is similar to ones defined in the COPRA, 1986.

=== Consumer Protection Councils (Body) ===
The job of the body is to advise the central government and the prime minister on issues to be mitigated and policies to be made regarding consumer protection.

== Rights of consumers ==
The consumer protection bill 2019 primarily defines the following consumer rights.

1. Be protected against marketing of goods and services which are hazardous to life and property.
2. Be informed of the quality, quantity, potency, purity, standard and price of goods and services.
3. Be assured of access to a variety of goods or services at competitive prices.
4. Seek redressal against unfair and restrictive trade practices.
