= National Consumer Disputes Redressal Commission =

Government agency in India

- राष्ट्रीय उपभोक्ता विवाद निवारण आयोग; NCDRC

Agency overview
- Formed: 1988
- Jurisdiction: India
- Headquarters: New Delhi
- Agency executive: Justice Amreshwar Pratap Sahi, President, NCDRC
- Website: ncdrc.nic.in

The National Consumer Disputes Redressal Commission (NCDRC) is a quasi-judicial government commission established in India in 1988 under the Consumer Protection Act of 1986. Headquartered in New Delhi, it serves as the apex national-level forum for consumer dispute resolution in India. The NCDRC is headed by a sitting or retired judge of the Supreme Court of India or a sitting or retired Chief Justice of a High Court.

The commission has jurisdiction to entertain consumer complaints valued at over ₹2 crore (US$250,000) and also possesses appellate and revision authority over State and District Consumer Disputes Redressal Commissions. It forms part of a three-tier quasi-judicial system established under the Consumer Protection Act to provide speedy and inexpensive redressal of consumer disputes.

As of 2024, the NCDRC is headed by Justice Amreshwar Pratap Sahi, former Chief Justice of Patna and Madras High Courts, and comprises nine other members. Appeals against NCDRC orders can be filed with the Supreme Court of India within 30 days.

== History ==
The NCDRC was established in 1988 under the provisions of the Consumer Protection Act, 1986. The creation of this quasi-judicial body was a significant milestone in India's consumer protection landscape, aimed at providing speedy and inexpensive redressal of consumer disputes. The first president of the NCDRC was Justice V. Balakrishna Eradi. Since its inception, the NCDRC has played a crucial role in promoting and protecting consumer rights in India. The Commission's establishment was part of a three-tier quasi-judicial machinery set up at the national, state, and district levels to address consumer grievances effectively.

Over the years, the NCDRC's jurisdiction and functions have evolved. Initially, it could entertain complaints where the value of goods or services exceeded ₹1 crore. However, with the enactment of the Consumer Protection Act, 2019, this pecuniary jurisdiction was revised to cover complaints valued above ₹10 crore. The NCDRC continues to operate from its headquarters in New Delhi, serving as the apex body in the consumer disputes redressal mechanism of India.

== See also ==
- Manu Needhi Consumer and Environmental Protection Centre
