= Vikram Award =

- Awarded for: Outstanding performance in national and international sports competitions
- Sponsored by: Government of Madhya Pradesh
- Location: Bhopal, Madhya Pradesh, India
- Country: India
- Presented by: Chief Minister Of Madhya Pradesh; Government of Madhya Pradesh
- Eligibility: Athletes with national and international medals in the last two out of five years
- Hosted by: Sports and Youth Welfare Department; Government of Madhya Pradesh
- Rewards: ₹2,00000, along with a blazer, tie and certificate
- First award: 1990
- Final award: 2022

Vikram Award is an award given by the Government of Madhya Pradesh, India, for outstanding performance in national and international competitions or contribution in the field of sports. The Vikram Award was instituted on May 15, 1990, with a purpose to acknowledge outstanding individual sporting achievements in events such as the Olympic Games, Asian Games, and National Games of India. It is the highest sports award in Madhya Pradesh, granted to athletes who are residents of the state and have competed in national and international senior-level competitions for a minimum of two years within the past five years. The award includes a cash prize of ₹2,00000, along with a blazer, tie, and certificate, presented by the Madhya Pradesh Government through the Madhya Pradesh Sports Authority. Provisions exist for offering government jobs to Vikram Awardees in Class III and IV category positions.

== Recipients ==
=== 2022 ===
In 2022, the Vikram Award was announced for 11 athletes which includes Aditya Dubey (Dewas) for soft tennis, Neetu Verma (Sehore) for kayaking and canoeing, Bhuraksha Dubey (Ashoknagar) for Wushu, Pragati Dubey (Raisen) for shooting, Raju Singh (Bhopal) for horse riding, and Subodh Chaurasia (Indore) for softball. Additionally, Avesh Khan (Indore) received the award in cricket, Neeraj Rana (Gwalior) in hockey, Dhananjay Dubey (Gwalior) in tennis (Divyang category), and Rajveer Singh Panwar (Ujjain) was awarded for Malkhamb.

=== 2021 ===
In the category of individual sports, the Vikram Award for 2021 awarded to Hoshangabad's Aadhya Tiwari (soft tennis), Indore's Annie Jain (swimming), Dhar's Aarti Nath (kayaking-canoeing), Bhopal's Manisha Keer (shooting), Indore's Sudipti Hajela (equestrian), Rohit Bajpai (Yoga), and Shreyanshi Pardeshi (badminton). For team sports, the award honored Jabalpur's Nancy Jain (Kho-Kho), Indore's Kanchan Jyoti Dixit (Kabaddi), and Dewas' Ragni Chauhan (softball). Mountaineers Bhagwan Singh Kushwaha and Ratnesh Pandey, who successfully scaled Mount Everest in 2016, were honored with Vikram Award in the adventure sports category. Bhopal's Poonam Sharma (Blind) received the Vikram Award for 2021 in the Divyang category.

=== 2020 ===
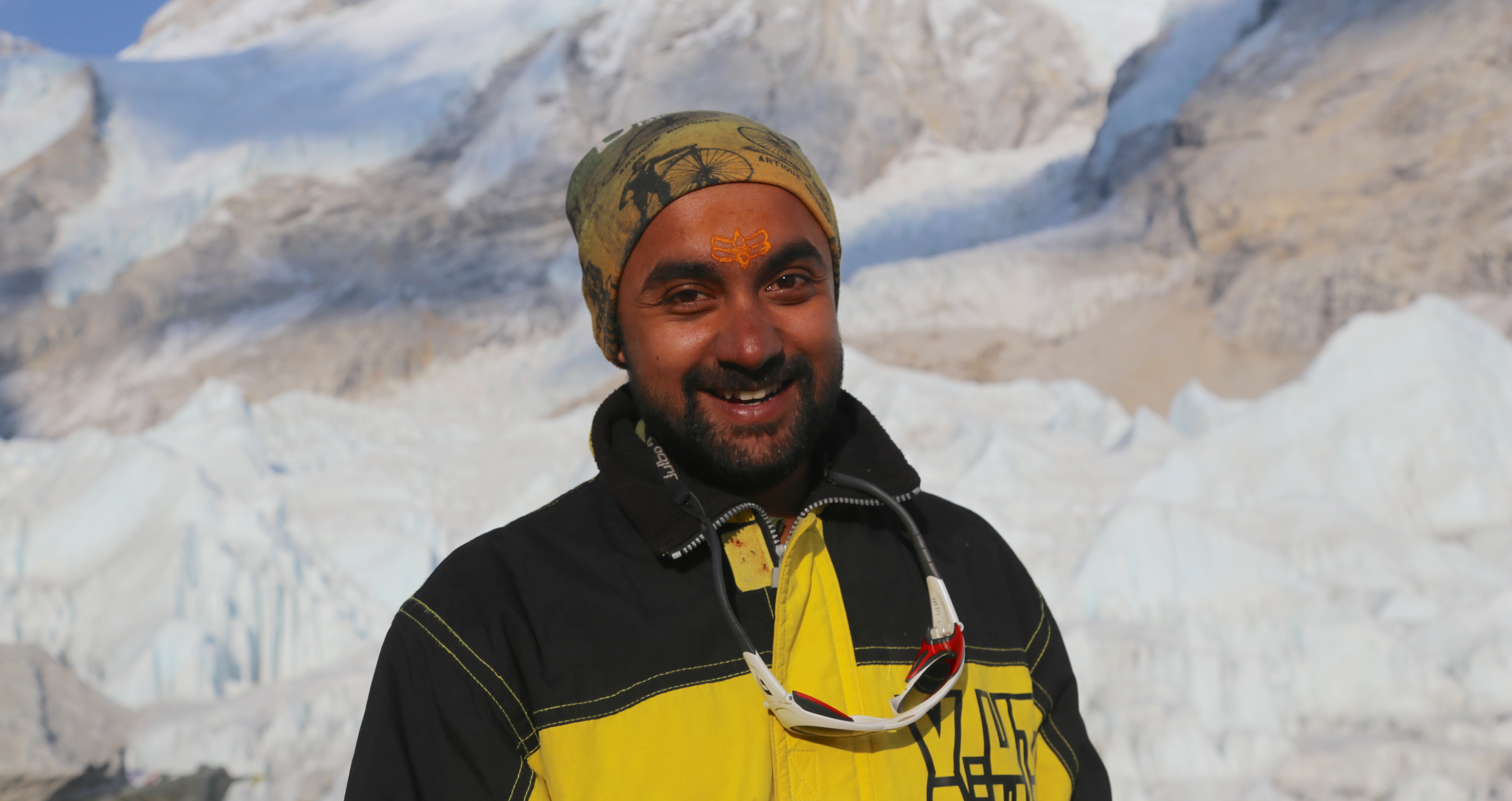
Ratnesh Pandey, a 2016 Mount Everest climber, received the 2021 Vikram Award for adventure sports

In 2021, the recipients of the Vikram Award 2020 were announced in individual sports included Vishwajit Singh (canoe-slalom, Hoshangabad), Sunidhi Chauhan (shooting, Bhopal), Nidhi Nanhet (karate, Balaghat), Paridhi Joshi (equestrian, Indore), Manju Bamboria (boxing, Ujjain), and Ekta Yadav (sailing, Bhopal). In team sports, Vivek Sagar Prasad (hockey, Hoshangabad), Harshwardhan Tomar (basketball, Gwalior), and Pooja Malviya (Mallakhamb, Ujjain) were honored with the Vikram Award. In the Divyang (handicapped) category, Prachi Yadav (para canoe, Gwalior) was awarded for her achievements.

=== 2019 ===
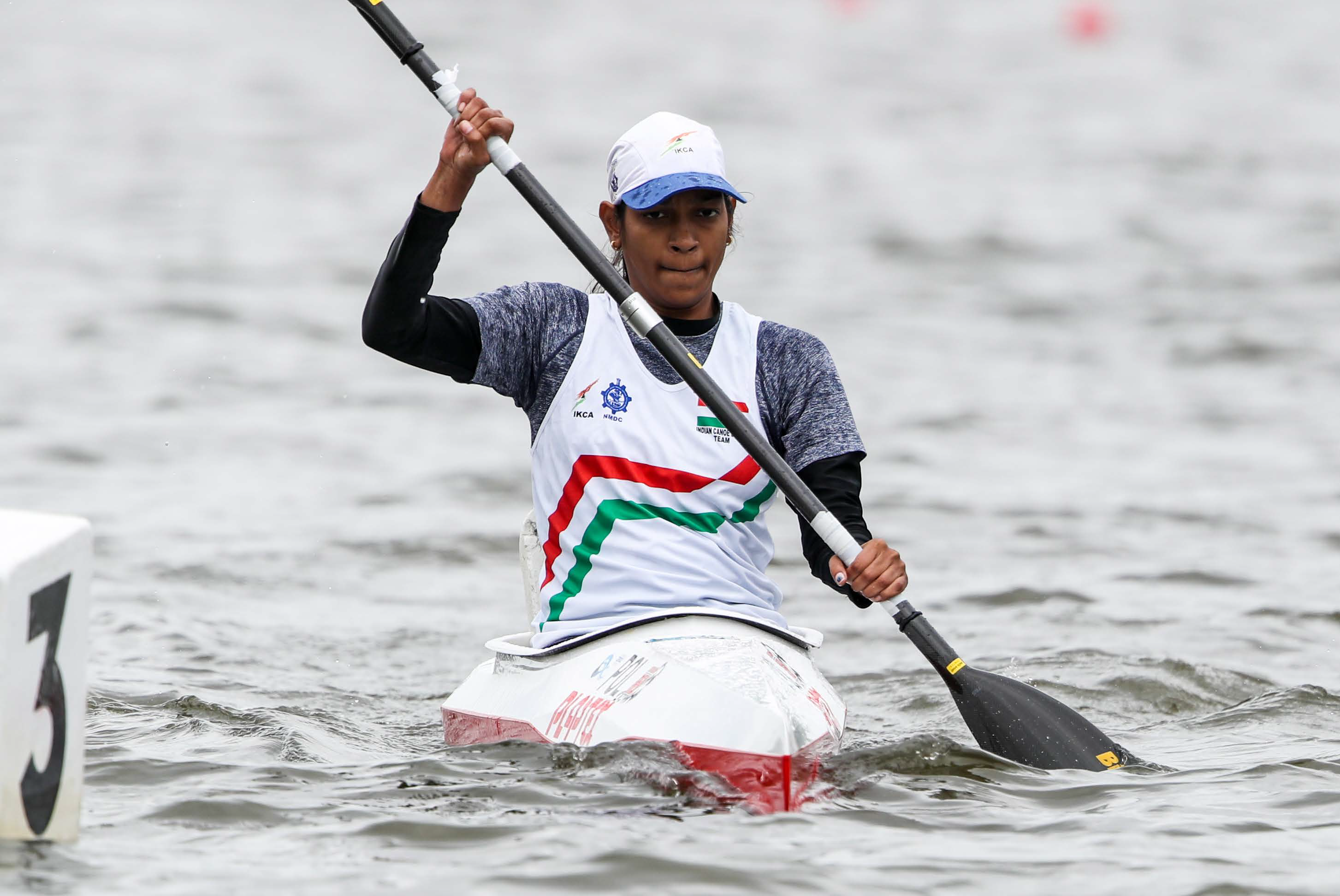
Paracanoe Athlete Prachi Yadav won a Vikram Award 2019 for Paracanoe

In the individual games category, the recipients included Rajeshwari Kushram (Canoeing-Kayaking), Faraz Khan (Horse Riding), Advait Pagae (Swimming), Muskan Kirar (Archery), Jai Meena (Soft Tennis) and Chinki Yadav (Shooting). In the group games category, the awardees includes Pooja Parkhe from Indore for Softball and Karishma Yadav from Gwalior for Hockey. Also, in the disabled category, the Vikram Award given to Janki Bai for Judo and Chandrakant Harde for Throwball.

=== 2018 ===
The recipients of Vikram Award 2018 included Harshita Tomar for Sailing (Hoshangabad), Virendra Batham for Canoeing-Kayaking (Bhopal), Pranay Khare for Horse Riding (Bhopal), Anam Basit for Shooting (Bhopal), Kirti Chandani for Soft Tennis (Bhopal), Rukmani for Rowing (Rajgarh), Juhi Jha for Kho kho (Indore), Pooja Vastrakar for Cricket (Shahdol) and Bhim Sonkar for Powerlifting (Indore). Also, in the disabled category, Sonu Golkar was awarded for his contributions to Cricket (Bhopal).

=== 2017 ===
In 2017, notable recipients of the Vikram Award included athletes such as Narendra Samelia (Kho-Kho) and Sarita Raikwar (Power Lifting), Sona Keer (Rowing), Affan Yousuf (Hockey), Shaila Charles (Sailing), Swechha Jatav (Wushu), Reena Scindia (Karate), Prince Parmar (Kayaking-Canoeing), Sanjay Singh Rathore (Shooting) and Dharmendra Ahirwar.

=== 2016 ===
In 2016, Vikram award was given to Namita Chandel (kayaking-canoeing), Poorvi Soni (wushu), Shalini Sankath (shooting), Rishabh Mehta (equestrian), Shravya Dronadula (taekwondo), Sameer Verma (badminton), Neetu Singh (kabaddi), Ankit Chintaman (kho-kho), Kamal Kushwaha (throw ball) and handicapped Ravi Kumar Surariya (cycling).

=== 2015 ===
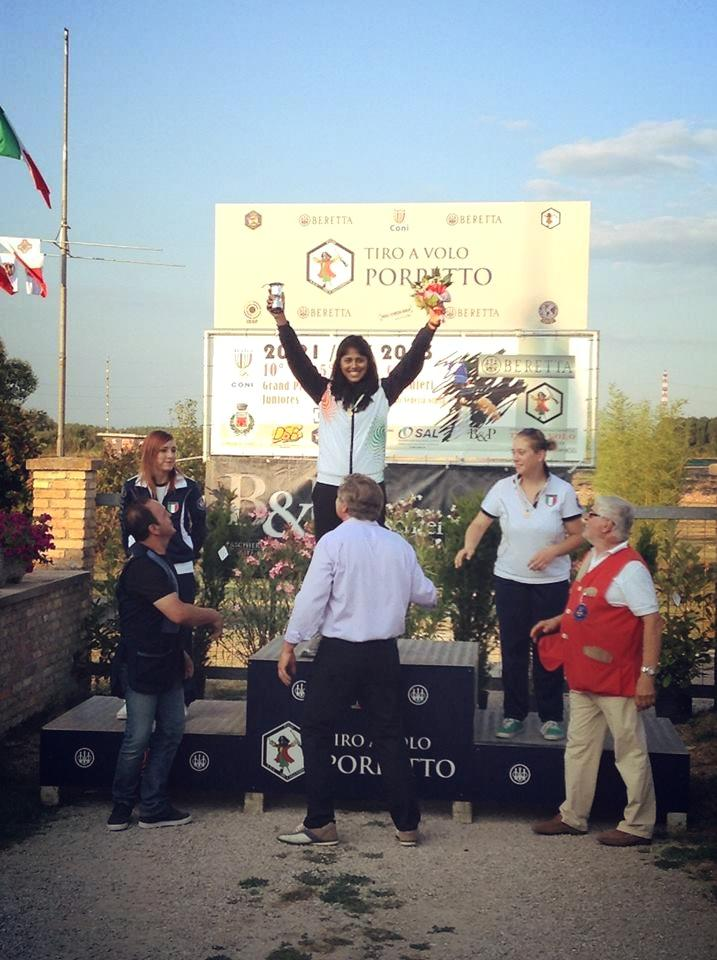
Shooting Varsha Varman received the Vikram Award in 2015 for her outstanding performance

In 2015, the Vikram Awards were presented to Varsha Varman (shooting), Ajay Yadav (karate), Riha David (soft tennis), Ankita Raikwar (wushu), Rohit Imoliya (swimming), Savita Parkhe (softball), Ami Kamani (snooker), and Gaurav Muchhal (badminton - disabled persons).

=== 2014 ===
In 2014, the Vikram Awards were presented to Supriya Jatav (karate), Amit Singh (fencing), Kuldeep Keer (kayaking and canoeing), Saurav Verma (badminton), Ajay Singh Baghel (sailing), Arjun Singh Rawat (taekwondo), Neelu Gaud (softball), Chandrasekhar Chauhan (Mallakhamba), and Satendra Singh Lohiya (swimming).

=== 2013 ===
In 2013, the awards were presented to Dilip Singh Negi from Bhopal (kayaking-canoeing), Ankit Sonkar from Jabalpur (karate), Aarti Khakal from Indore (taekwondo), Shanu Mahajan from Bhopal (fencing), Surbhi Pathak from Indore (shooting), Rohan Singh Thar from Jabalpur (wushu), Jalaj Saxena from Indore (cricket), Anjali Thar from Bhopal (soft tennis), and Kamil Qayyum Khan from Bhopal (kayaking-canoeing).

== See also ==
- Sports in Madhya Pradesh
