= Deafness in India =

India is home to approximately 63 million people of the deaf and hard of hearing community (DHH). It has been argued that while India's government has focused heavily on modernizing the country with technological resources and infrastructure, the needs of the DHH residents of India have been ignored. Although sign language has been evolving within the country, it was not until 2017 that the Indian government decided to codify sign language in a dictionary format.

== Cultural neglect ==
In a study conducted by Dr. Jill Jepson, a fellow of the National Institute on Aging at the University of California, San Francisco, she examined the linguistics and sociolinguistics of sign language and hearing within India. Dr. Jepson focused her research primarily on the urban states of Uttar Pradesh, Rajasthan, Maharashtra, and Tamil Nadu. She concluded that families and people of the DHH community, either late-deafened or born deaf, were ashamed of deafness and were looking for ways to fix it. Instead of using the social model of disability to find ways to help d/Deaf and hard of hearing people adjust to society, many families visited physicians to try to remedy their child's deafness. They also experimented on the deaf with traditional and folk procedures, including rituals, fasts, and vigils. It is important to keep in mind that only a small sample size was interviewed as most people were afraid or ashamed of getting interviewed because of the negative consequences (rejection, neglect, abuse by family and society).

Even today in 2023, the deaf community experiences cultural negligence. There are two deaf communities in India: those who are capitalize the "D" in deaf, and those who do not. The capitalization represents those who are profoundly or severely deaf; they consider themselves to be culturally Deaf. They accept themselves as Deaf and are part of a Deaf community. Sign language is their native language and they prefer to speak and use sign language when able. Many of them have acquired a good knowledge of sign language and are comfortable with it and are in different professions.

Those who do not capitalize "deaf" are also known as medically or clinically deaf. These are people who became deaf after the language acquisition period or have acquired deafness later in life in some way. They often consider themselves part of the mainstream society i.e. the hearing community; many may use a hearing aid and access speech therapy for. Rather than using sign language, they may prefer to use the hearing aids and search for medical treatment to improve their hearing ability.

Cultural struggles and stigma surrounding d/Deaf inclusion in India can lead to medical neglect, cultural deprivation, and lack of access to assistance.

== Deaf education ==
The country of India places a large emphasis on education. However, there is little to no reliable literature accessible on education for DHH people, especially children. The biggest problem that Indian DHH children face is that India has eighteen equally significant languages that hold mutual dominance, due to cultural diversity within the country. Developmental teachers struggle to choose which languages to teach their students. Even within specific languages, dialect difference can lead to issues in learning cohesion. With hearing loss specifically, schools for DHH children are limited and generally choose English as the main language. This is due to the widespread prevalence of English in multiple schools throughout the country. However, teaching American Sign Language to DHH children in India means there is little cross-intelligibility with local languages. This puts families at odds regarding cultural assimilation. Other issues facing deaf education in India include lack of funding, lack of experiences instructors, lack of awareness, and lack of governmental support.

== Employment ==
A census conducted in 2011 revealed that out of 13.4 million individuals between the ages of 15–59 with a hearing disability in India 73.9% were marginal workers. This implies that only 26.1% of the active group were actually employed. It is extremely difficult for people of the DHH community to obtain an education, as they are unable to learn basic skills that the hearing population would learn at a young age. There are not many organizations that active aid the DHH community of India, besides the Mook Badhir Mandal (an organization that specifically targets job inequality within the nation).

== Deaf organizations ==
There are organizations such as the Deaf Enabled Foundation in India, Sai Swayam Society - Empowering the Deaf & Mute, and The National Association of the Deaf (India) that are advocating for the DHH community. The Deaf Enabled Foundation of India focuses on gaining equal access for the deaf through "development, enhancement of quality of life, providing educational facilities, and social and cultural awareness." This organization has established a DEF skills center, academic academy and sign academy. Sai Swayam Society has been providing the DHH community with several resources such as skill training, remedial education, livelihood, and access to interpreters. Lastly, the NAD in India has a bit more access to funding and resources on a larger platform as they branch off from the government. With this governmental connection, they are able to and have been working with NGOs around the country to target deaf rights issues, hosted state level meetings to recruit members that have connections in unnoticed high deaf population areas of the nation, and organized three national consultations. Besides these three predominant organizations there are several other organizations within the nation that are actively taking steps to advocate for the DHH community.

== See also ==
- Disability in India
- Education in India § Deaf education in India
