= Human Rights Law Network =

Indian non-profit

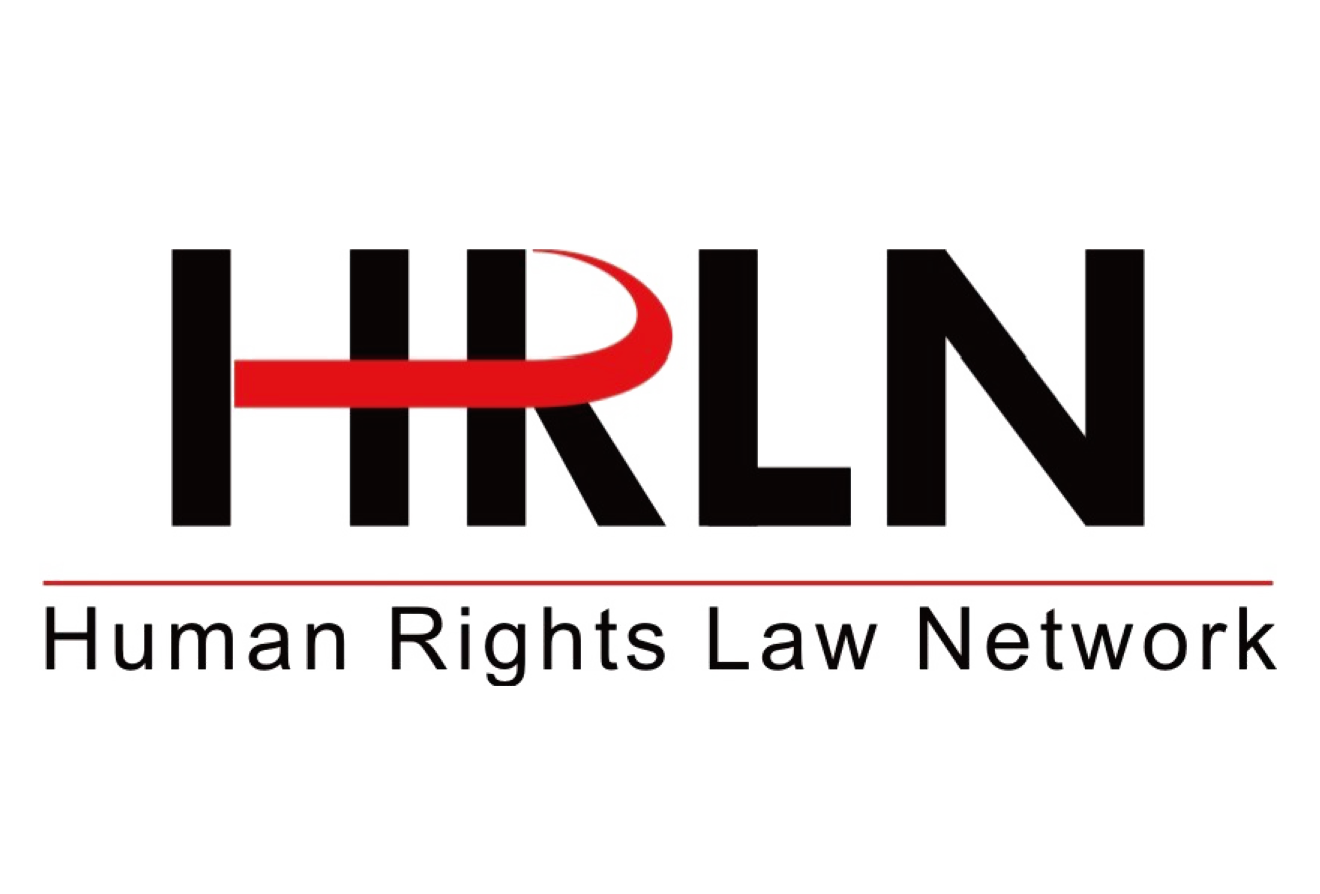
- Abbreviation: HRLN
- Formation: 1989
- Founder: Colin Gonsalves
- Type: Non-governmental organisation
- Headquarters: New Delhi, India
- Parent organization: Socio-Legal Information Centre
- Website: www.hrln.org

The Human Rights Law Network (HRLN) is an Indian non-profit organisation founded in 1989 to protect the fundamental human rights and civil liberties of the most marginalised and vulnerable members of society. Working on the intersection of law, advocacy, policy, and education, HRLN is organised as a collective of lawyers and social activists dedicated to providing legal assistance to vulnerable and disadvantaged individuals, advocating for the implementation of structures to safeguard human rights and fight systemic oppression, and educating the public on their rights and remedies. HRLN provides pro bono legal services to marginalised groups, conducts investigations into human rights violations, and undertakes high-stakes impact litigation in service of the public interest. The organisation operates across the spectrum of public interest law, focusing specifically on children's rights, rights of disabled persons, rights of people living with HIV/AIDS, prisoners' rights, refugee rights, rights of indigenous people, workers' rights, rights of minorities, and the protection of victims of sexual violence or trafficking.

HRLN is a project of the Socio-Legal Information Centre (SLIC), a non-profit legal aid and education organisation which provides free legal assistance to those people who lack the capacity to seek legal remedy. The SLIC files more than 100 petitions each year to protect the health, dignity, and rights of Indian citizens. SLIC and HRLN are together India's largest, most active legal human rights program and reproductive rights unit. SLIC is also an implementing partner of the United Nations High Commissioner for Refugees.

== Details ==
A non-profit non-governmental organization, HRLN started in 1989 as a small group of concerned lawyers and social activists from Bombay. The team was led by Colin Gonsalves, a leading public interest lawyer, and now a Senior Advocate of the Supreme Court of India. Today, HRLN is considered the country's leading public interest law group and has a nationwide network of more than 200 lawyers, paralegals, and social activists spread across 26 states/Union Territories.

HRLN is also the parent body of the Indian People's Tribunal (IPT), also called the Indian People's Tribunal on Environmental and Human Rights or Independent People's Tribunal. Set up in June 1993, IPT is an unofficial panel led by retired judges who conduct public inquiries into human rights and environmental abuses. It provides an alternate outlet for the victims faced with official obstruction and delays in the delivery of justice. IPT conducts investigations into cases of relocation of rural people to make way for dams or parks, eviction of slum dwellers, industrial pollution and communal or state-sponsored violence.

In 2013, HRLN was awarded the MacArthur Award for Creative and Effective Institutions for its contributions to reproductive rights advocacy in India.

== Activities ==
=== Legal aid and public interest litigation ===
HRLN offers pro-bono legal services to those with little or no access to the justice system, and runs a helpline for people seeking such help. It also conducts litigation in the public interest. Lawyers of HRLN take up cases in the lower courts as well as the Supreme Court and various state High Courts.

=== Legal education ===
HRLN provides training through several avenues and also trains young lawyers. HRLN also periodically publishes 'know your rights' material. The group also provides opportunities for internships and scholarships and organizes country-wide seminars, workshops, and training courses, such as paralegal certificate courses.

=== Advocacy ===
HRLN works to increase public awareness through research and dissemination of information on violations and anti-poor policies. HRLN has formulated laws and policies against child sexual abuse, against communal crimes, and for the right to food and work.

=== Investigations, monitoring, and crisis response ===
HRLN conducts fact-finding missions to monitor and document cases of violations. It also deploys crisis-intervention teams and makes sure that these cases take the form of petitions in court.

=== Publications ===
HRLN has published books on human rights, Dalit rights, refugee rights, violence against women, HIV/AIDS, trafficking, right to food, juvenile justice, domestic violence, and prisoner rights, among others. It also regularly produces films on human rights matters.

== Initiatives ==
- Children's rights
- Criminal Justice
- Dalit Rights
- Disability Rights
- Emergency/Disaster
- Environmental Justice
- HIV / AIDS and Positive living rights
- Housing Rights
- Defend the defenders
- Labour rights
- Acid attack
- Anti-Trafficking and Slavery
- Women's Justice
- Reproductive Rights
- People's Health Rights
- Refugee Rights
- Right to Food
- Students for Human Rights
- Public Interest Litigation
- Sexuality Minority Rights
- Secularism and Peace
- Right to information
- Prisoners' Rights

== Significant cases ==
=== Rohingya refugees deportation case ===
HRLN is involved in fighting for Rohingya refugee rights in the Supreme Court of India and Jammu and Kashmir High Court. HRLN founder Colin Gonsalves is representing 6000 Rohingya refugees in Jammu to prevent their deportation back to Myanmar, where they face persecution.

=== Abortion plea for a 13-year-old pregnant rape victim ===
6 September 2017: In a landmark judgment for reproductive rights, The Supreme Court of India permitted a 13-year-old rape victim to terminate her pregnancy at 32 weeks asking "how can such a small girl become a mother" in a case filed by HRLN. Earlier, on 28 July 2017 the top court had rejected a petition, on medical grounds, filed by another 10-year-old rape victim, who sought permission to terminate her 32-week-old pregnancy, which makes this recent judgment a big step in the right direction towards upholding the reproductive rights of women. The Medical Termination of Pregnancy Act, 1970, does not permit abortions beyond 20 weeks of pregnancy—a law that has been criticized for affecting women who discover abnormalities in the foetus or develop complications later in their pregnancies, and rape victims—particularly underage ones.

=== Kedar Nath Yadav vs. State of West Bengal and Others, 2016 ===
In this high-profile case of state acquisition of agricultural land under emergency clause for industrial projects of private companies, HRLN in 2016 won the case on the behalf of farmers. In 2006, Tata company announced the setting up of a plant to manufacture its Nano 'small car' on 997 acres of land belonging to poor farmers in West Bengal's Singur district. It This acquisition was challenged by the farmers in the Supreme Court. HRLN lawyers appeared for some of the farmers and Supreme Court in 2016 quashed the acquisition. The Supreme Court also directed that the lands be returned to the farmers and that the compensation paid to them by the company be retained by the farmers.

=== Archbishop Raphael Cheenath S.V.D. vs. State of Orissa and Anr, 2008 ===
Huge human rights violations of innocent people took place in Kandhamal district following the assassination of VHP leader Swami Laxmanananda Saraswati where least 39 Christians were killed and 232 churches destroyed in the August 2008 violence. The Supreme Court in its judgement asked the Odisha government to re-investigate the closure of 315 cases out of the total 827 cases registered related to anti-Christian violence in Kandhamal district in 2008, and "see that the offenders are brought to book" which were earlier closed by the state police on the ground that either the offenders could not be traced or no offence was made out. The court also directed the state to pay additional compensation to the victims of the riots—Rs 3 lakh for the families of those killed in the violence.

=== Dhal Singh Dewangan vs. State of Chhattisgarh, 2014 ===
In a rare judgement, the Supreme Court acquitted a death row victim who was found guilty and sentenced to death by a trial court and the High Court saying the prosecution had not proved the charge against him of murdering his wife and five daughters on the basis of evidence on record. "In our view, the circumstances mentioned do not form a complete chain of evidence as not to leave any reasonable ground for the conclusion consistent with the innocence of the appellant, nor do the circumstances exclude every possible hypothesis except the guilt of the accused," the court said.

=== Shabnam Hashmi vs. Union of India and Others, 2005 ===
In this case argued by HLRN founder Colin Gonsalves, the Supreme Court extended the right to adopt a child to Muslims, Christians, Jews, Parsis and all other religious communities. This right had been till the judgment been restricted to Hindus, Buddhists and Jains. The court ruled that any person can adopt a child under the Juvenile Justice (Care and Protection of Children) Act 2000 irrespective of religion he or she follows and even if the personal laws of the particular religion do not permit it.

=== Occupational health and safety association vs. Union of India and Others, 2005 ===
Colin Gonsalves represented the Occupational Health and Safety Organization in their writ petition asking the Supreme Court to issue directions to the government to make guidelines for safety of workers from occupational disease. The Petitioner represented about 130 CoalFired thermal power plants (CFTPPs) in India spread over different states, but functioning without proper occupational health services facility in place. The Supreme Court delivered a judgment that the right to health and medical care, while in service or post-retirement, is a fundamental right of a worker, and that right to health i.e. right to live in a clean, hygienic and safe environment is a right flowing from Article 21: the Protection Of Life And Personal Liberty.

=== Sandesh Bansal vs. Union of India, 2008 ===
Filed in 2008 by HRLN on the behalf of Sandesh Bansal, a health activist and member of the Jan Adhikaar Manch, the case sought accountability for the government's failure to respect, protect, and fulfill the rights of pregnant women. The Supreme Court recognized that a woman's right to survive pregnancy and childbirth is a fundamental right protected under Article 21 of the Indian Constitution. The court said, "It is the primary duty of the government to ensure that every woman survives pregnancy and child birth, for that, the State of Madhya Pradesh is under obligation to secure their life". In recognition of the fundamental nature of these rights, the Court ordered immediate implementation of the National Rural Health Mission, with a focus on strengthening infrastructure, providing access to timely maternal health services, skilled personnel, effective referral and grievance redressal mechanisms.

=== The National Association of the Deaf through its joint secretary and Another vs. Union of India and Another, 2011 ===
In this landmark judgement which benefited millions of deaf people in India, the Delhi High Court permitted deaf people to take driving tests, and obtain licences if they passed. Prior to this, the Motor Vehicles Act and Rules automatically disqualified deaf persons from obtaining licences on the presumption that deaf persons would be a danger to the public. HRLN filed a public interest petition in the Delhi High Court on the behalf of the National Association of the Deaf submitting that there was no evidence anywhere in the world to show that deaf persons would be a danger to the public, and that on the contrary, studies had shown that they were more careful drivers.

=== Devika Biswas vs. Union of India, 2012 ===
This petition was filed in response to the sterilization camp massacre in Bihar. Forced sterilizations were conducted on 53 women within a span of merely two hours. Subsequent fact-finding missions showed that the victims had not been given information about the operation, nor was their consent obtained. Their post-op conditions were not paid attention to, and they were left unattended to after the surgeries. In another instance from Chhattisgarh, 15 women died after surgeries in another sterilization "camp". In two camps, doctors used just two laparoscopes to operate on more than 30 women. Following her own investigation, the petitioner, health rights activist Devika Biswas, claimed before the Supreme Court of India (Court) that these incidents constituted a violation of the Constitution of India. The petition sought monetary compensation, directions for safety of patients, guidelines for terms of operations etc. The Supreme Court issued binding guidelines were issued for the conduct of sterilisation operations.

=== Jeeja Ghosh and Another vs. Union of India and Others ===
Following an HRLN petition, the Supreme Court ordered SpiceJet airlines to pay Rs 10 lakh as damages to a flyer suffering from cerebral palsy who was forcibly offloaded in 2012. The bench noted that disabled flyer Jeeja Ghosh was not given "appropriate, fair and caring treatment", which she required with "due sensitivity" and the decision to de-board her was "uncalled for" and violation of "human dignity". Ghosh, a disability rights activist, was offloaded from a SpiceJet flight in February 2012 from Kolkata when she was going to attend a conference in Goa hosted by NGO ADAPT (Able Disable All People Together). The top court held that the decision to offload Ghosh was taken by the airlines "in a callous manner", without any medical advice or consideration and her condition was not such that it required any assistive devices or aids.

=== Parivartan Kendra vs. Union of India and Others ===
Two sisters from the Dalit community from Bihar were brutally attacked with acid on 21 October 2012. One suffered burns on 28% of her body and 90% of her face, following the acid attack. Parivartan Kendra, a women's group, filed a petition with the support of HRLN seeking to ensure that acid attack survivors are properly rehabilitated and are treated with immediate care, sensitivity and skill.

The Supreme Court directed the Bihar government to compensate the first victim with Rs 10 Lakhs, and her sister with Rs 3 Lakhs. It also pointed out that the compensation for acid attack victims would be decided after considering the extent of their injuries. The Court additionally directed all the States and Union Territories to consider the plight of such victims and take appropriate steps regarding inclusion of their names under the disability list. In addition to fighting cases for the welfare of acid attack victims, HRLN also works extensively with and organises conferences on violence against women.

=== Maharashtra chief secretary asked to pay Rs 100 crore for river pollution ===
The Supreme Court in November, 2017, ordered the Maharashtra government to pay Rs. 100 crore as compensation for the restoration of the Ulhas and Waldhuni rivers. The case pertained to the heavy pollution that was taking place in the Ulhas and Waldhuni rivers flowing through Maharashtra. Advocate Zaman Ali of the Human Rights Law Network (HRLN) appeared on behalf of the petitioner, Vanashakti Public Trust.
