= I Am Jeeja =

Indian documentary film

- Directed by: Swati Chakraborty
- Starring: Jeeja Ghosh
- Release date: 30 January 2018
- Running time: 28 minutes
- Country: India
- Language: Hindi

I Am Jeeja is an Indian documentary film directed by filmmaker Swati Chakraborty that recounts the story of Jeeja Ghosh, an Indian disability rights activist who has cerebral palsy. Through this film, Swati has attempted to show the lives and battles of individuals living with the disability. The film won numerous awards including the National Film Award and Top Award.

== Synopsis ==
I Am Jeeja is a 28-minute long documentary about a young lady named Jeeja Ghosh, who was born with cerebral palsy. Jeeja was educated at University of Delhi and graduated from the University of Leeds. From a young age, her family supported her for her dreams.

The film also covers an upsetting incident that took place with her and also made news headlines. In 2012, she was asked to get off an aircraft while she was traveling from Kolkata to Goa. The authorities onboard believed her condition could pose a threat to other passengers.

After four years, in 2016, the airline had to compensate her with ₹10 lakh. The Supreme Court stated "the incident was unreasonable discrimination against her."

== Release ==
The documentary was selected to be screened at the Mumbai International Film Festival on 30 January 2018. It was awarded the Best Film on Social Issues in the Non-Feature films category at the 64th National Film Awards.

I Am Jeeja also won the Top Award at We Care Film Festival award.

== People featured ==
- Bappaditya Nag
- Jeeja Ghosh
