= Colin Gonsalves =

Indian lawyer

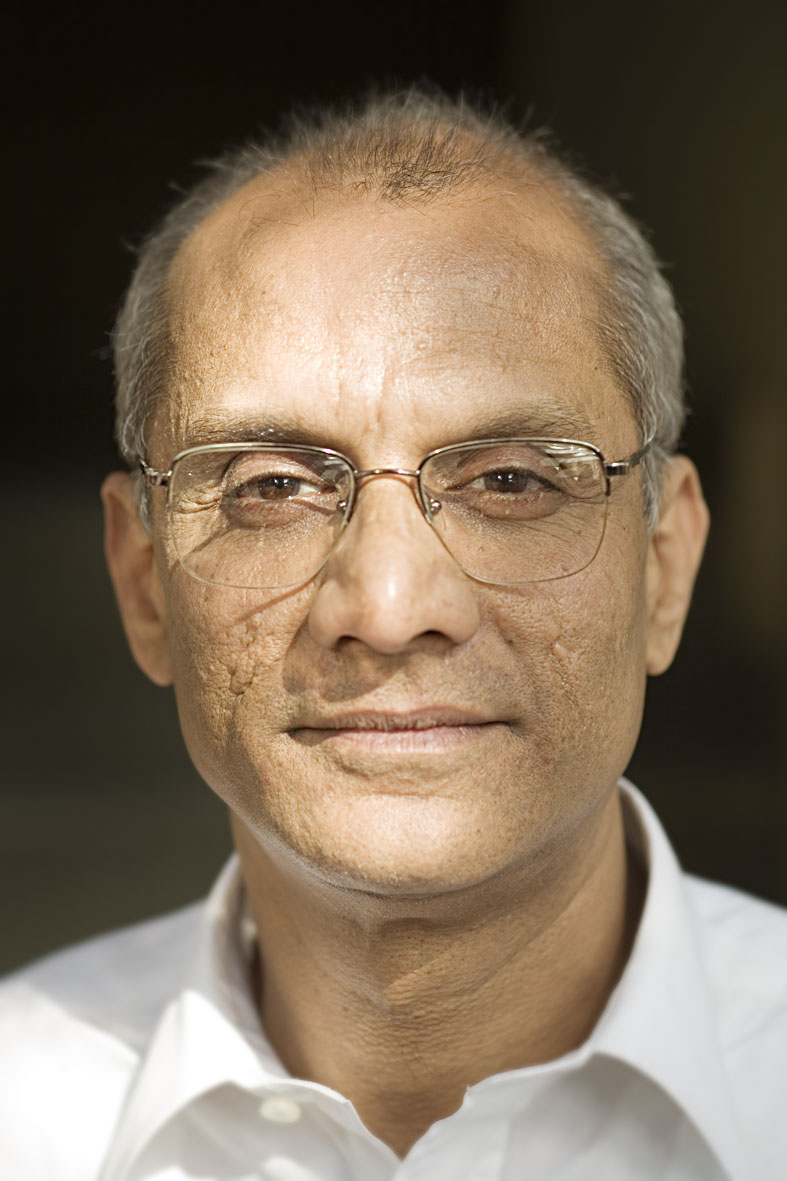
- Born: 24 May 1952 (age 74)
- Education: IIT Bombay (BTech); University of Mumbai (LLB)
- Occupations: Senior advocate, Supreme Court of India
- Known for: Founder, Human Rights Law Network; Co-Convenor, Indian People's Tribunal; Member of the Expert Group, appointed to draft the Optional Protocol to the International Covenant on Economic, Social and Cultural Rights 2006
- Awards: Right Livelihood Award

Colin Gonsalves is a designated Senior Advocate of the Supreme Court of India and the founder of Human Rights Law Network (HRLN). He specializes in human rights protection, labour law and public interest law. He has been awarded Right Livelihood Award for the year 2017 for "his tireless and innovative use of public interest litigation over three decades to secure fundamental human rights for India’s most marginalised and vulnerable citizens." Considered a pioneer in the field of public interest litigation in India, he has brought several cases dealing with economic, social and cultural rights. Most of these cases, decided by the Supreme Court, have been set as precedents.

Since co-founding HRLN in 1989, Colin Gonsalves and his colleagues have built the organization into India's leading public interest law group, working at the intersection of law, advocacy and policy. He also co-developed the Indian People's Tribunal (IPT), an independent organization headed by retired Supreme Court and High Court judges to investigate human rights violations. Fact-findings presented at the IPTs have spurred public interest litigation, formed social movements and led to concrete policy changes.

Colin Gonsalves has written, edited and co-edited numerous articles and books on a range of human rights law issues.

== Education ==
Colin Gonsalves, is a BTech (1975) from the Department of Civil Engineering, IIT Bombay. He began working as a civil engineer, but was drawn to the law through union work and concerns over labour issues and exploitation. He then started studying law at night school in 1979. Upon graduation in 1983, he co-founded the India Centre for Human Rights and Law in Mumbai (Bombay) and developed it into a national network of over 200 lawyers and paralegals, activists under the auspices of the Human Rights Law Network (HRLN).

Gonsalves strives to use the law as a shield to protect the human rights of the poor and of the marginalized communities in India. Over last two decades, he has played a prominent role in investigating, monitoring, and documenting human rights violations, generating "know your rights" material, and conducting training seminars and workshops for lawyers, activists, judges, and government officials including police and civic administrators.

== Awards and achievements ==
- Winner of Right Livelihood Award for the year 2017. While recognising the works of Mr Gonsalves, the award announcement reads-"Colin Gonsalves (India) is honoured by the Jury "for his tireless and innovative use of public interest litigation over three decades to secure fundamental human rights for India’s most marginalised and vulnerable citizens"."
- Winner of the N.C.P.E.D.P.-Shell Helen Keller awards, 2003. Instituted in 1999, the N.C.P.E.D.P.-Shell Helen Keller awards symbolise an equal playing field for people with disabilities.
- Winner of the 2004 International Human Rights Award of the American Bar Association in public recognition of his contribution to the area of human rights.
- Honoured by IIT, Bombay with Distinguished Alumnus Award on its 51st Foundation Day function for his outstanding contribution to society and bringing honour to his alma mater with his path-defining works and achievements.
- Winner of the Mother Teresa Memorial Award for Social Justice 2010 for legal aid in addressing human rights.
- Presented with the award of Doctor of the University, honoris causa, by the University of Middlesex, UK. for his outstanding contribution to society and path-defining works and achievements in the field of humanitarian laws.
- Presented with the Honour for "Pioneering and Exemplary Leadership in Advancing Women’s Reproductive Rights and Social Justice in India" by the Centre for Reproductive Rights.

== Important Public Interest Litigations brought by Colin Gonsalves ==
- Final Report of the Committee appointed by the Government of India (vide notification No. V 25011/160/2010 –HR dated April 15, 2010) to enquire into “Alleged irregularities in the conduct of studies using Human Papilloma Virus (HPV) vaccine by PATH in India”. New Delhi: GoI; 2011 Feb 15.
- Department-related Parliamentary Standing Committee on Health and Family Welfare, Department of Health and Family Welfare. Seventy second report on alleged irregularities in the conduct of studies using Human Papilloma Virus (HPV) vaccine by PATH in India. New Delhi: Rajya Sabha Secretariat; 2013 Aug 30
- Colin Gonsalves is representing 6000 Rohingya Refugees in Jammu to prevent their deportation back to Myanmar where they face persecution.
- In response to a case argued by Colin Gonsalves, the Supreme Court directed unions and state governments to implement several food security schemes.
- Extra Judicial Execution Victim Families Association (EEVFAM) and Anr Vs Union of India and Anr, 2012: In a landmark judgement, the Supreme Court ordered a CBI probe by a special investigating team (SIT) into the 98 fake encounter killings in Manipur in the last decade submit a report in the first week of January 2018. The Court held that armed forces cannot use excessive force even in areas that come under the Armed Forces Special Powers Act (AFSPA).
- In a landmark judgment by the Supreme Court of India filed by child rights group Bachpan Bachao Andolan on child labour and trafficking of children for forced labour, the Supreme Court directed the government to ensure the implementation of the Juvenile Justice (Care and Protection of Children) Act, 2000. Gonsalves appeared on behalf of Bachpan Bachao Andolan.
- Kedar Nath Yadav vs State of West Bengal & Others, 2016: In this high-profile case of state acquisition of agricultural land under emergency clause for industrial projects of private companies, HRLN in 2016 won the case on the behalf of farmers. In 2006, Tata company announced the setting up of a plant to manufacture its Nano 'small car' on 997 acres of land belonging to poor farmers in West Bengal's Singur district. It This acquisition was challenged by the farmers in the Supreme Court. HRLN lawyers appeared for some of the farmers and Supreme Court in 2016 quashed the acquisition. The Supreme Court also directed that the lands be returned to the farmers and that the compensation paid to them by the company be retained by the farmers.
- Parivartan Kendra Vs Union of India and Ors, 2013: In this case argued by Colin Gonsalves, filed by NGO Parivartan Kendra on behalf of Chanchal Paswan and her sister who became victims of an acid attack, the Supreme Court directed all states and union territories to include acid attack victims in the disability list in highlighting the plight of acid attack victims and the inadequacy of the payable compensation. The court also said, "state shall upon itself take full responsibility for the treatment and rehabilitation of the victims of acid attack as per the Guidelines provided in Laxmi vs. Union of India." The court also awarded a compensation of Rs. 13 lakh for the Paswan sisters.
- Archbishop Raphael Cheenath S.V.D. Vs State of Orissa and Anr, 2008: Huge human rights violations of innocent people took place in Kandhmal district following the assassination of VHP leader Swami Laxmanananda Saraswati where least 39 Christians were killed and 232 churches destroyed in the August 2008 violence. The Supreme Court in its judgement asked the Odisha government to re-investigate the closure of 315 cases out of the total 827 cases registered related to anti-Christian violence in Kandhamal district in 2008, and "see that the offenders are brought to book" which were earlier closed by the state police on the ground that either the offenders could not be traced or no offence was made out.. The court also directed the state to pay additional compensation to the victims of the riots – Rs 3 lakh for the families of those killed in the violence.
- In Shabman Hashmi vs. Union of India and Others, argued by Colin Gonsalves, the Supreme Court extended the right to adopt a child to Muslims, Christians, Jews, Parsis and all other communities. This right had been till the judgment been restricted to Hindus, Buddhists and Jains. The court ruled that any person can adopt a child under the Juvenile Justice (Care and Protection of Children) Act 2000 irrespective of religion he or she follows and even if the personal laws of the particular religion does not permit it.
- In Occupational Health and Safety Association v. Union of India, 2005, argued by Colin Gonsalves on the behalf of Occupational Health and Safety Association, the Supreme Court delivered a judgment that the right to health and medical care, while in service or post-retirement, is a fundamental right of a worker, and that Right to health is a right flowing from Article 21: the right to protection of life and personal liberty.
- Dhal Singh Dewangan Vs State of Chhattisgarh, 2014: In a rare judgement, the Supreme Court acquitted a death row victim who was found guilty and sentenced to death by a trial court and the High Court saying the prosecution has not proved the charge against him of murdering his wife and five daughters on the basis of evidence on record. "In our view, the circumstances mentioned do not form a complete chain of evidence as not to leave any reasonable ground for the conclusion consistent with the innocence of the appellant, nor do the circumstances exclude every possible hypothesis except the guilt of the accused," the court said.
- In the National Association of the Deaf v. Union of India, 2009, argued by Colin Gonsalves, the Delhi High Court opened the doors for deaf people to take driving tests, and if they pass, get a driving licence for the first time in India. Prior to this the Motor Vehicles Act and Rules automatically disqualify a deaf person from obtaining a licence on the presumption that deaf persons would be a danger to the public.
- Colin Gonsalves is currently arguing against the deportation of Rohingya Muslims who have been driven out from Myanmar in a bloody crackdown by the Myanmar army.
