= Ratnesh Pandey =

Indian mountaineer (born 1985)

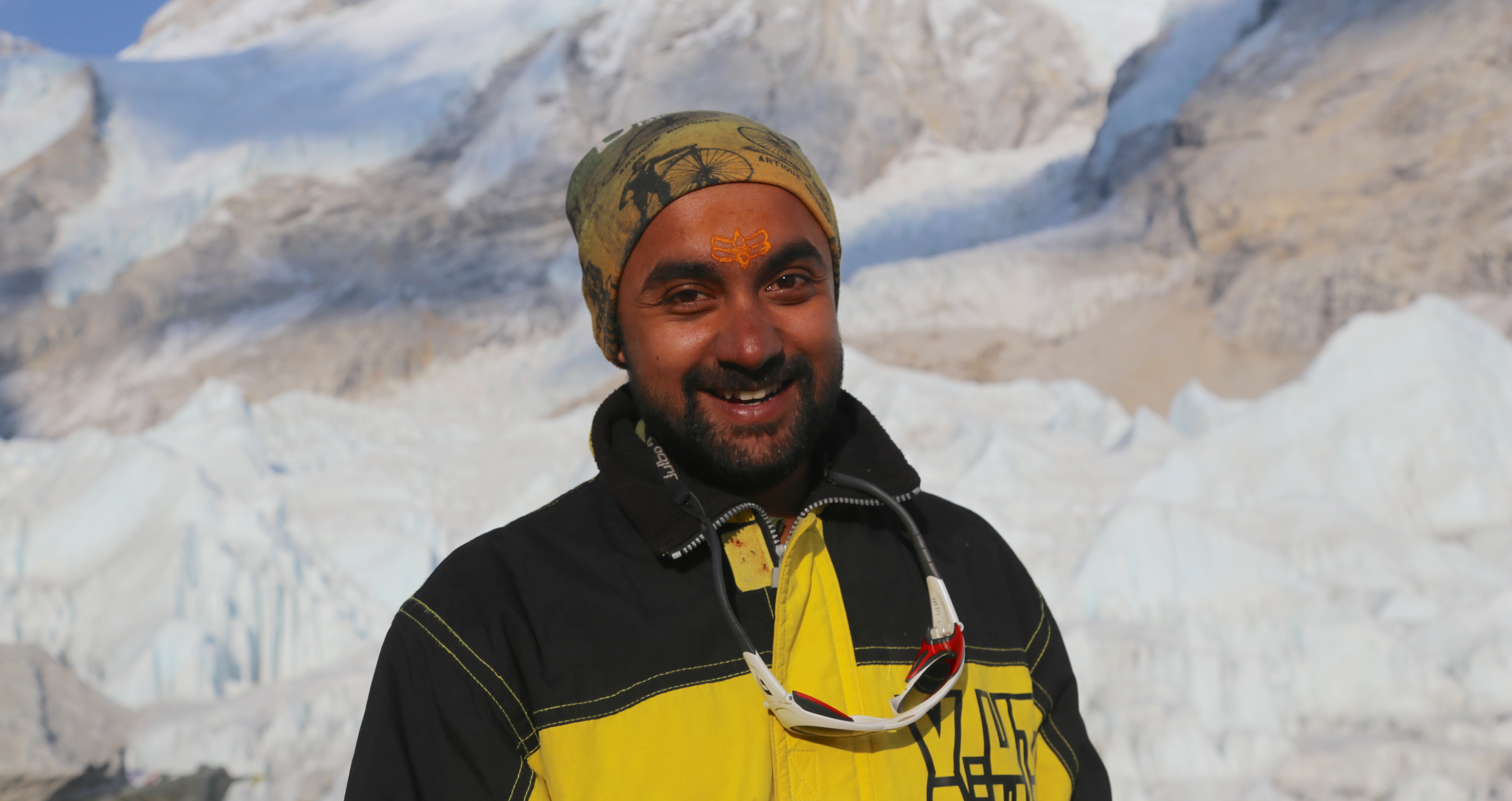
- Pandey on mission to Mt. Everest

Personal information
- Nationality: Indian (India)
- Born: Ratnesh Pandey; 12 May 1985 (age 41) Satna, Madhya Pradesh, India

Climbing career
- Major ascents: Mount Everest (2016); Mount Damavand and Mount Sabalan (2016); Mount Elbrus (2018)

Ratnesh Pandey (born 12 May 1985) is an Indian mountaineer, who climbed Mount Everest in 2016.

He also holds a Guinness World Record for his motorbike stunts. He received the Khel Alankaran award by the Government of Madhya Pradesh in November 2016.

== Early life ==
Pandey is from Satna, Madhya Pradesh, India. He is a BBA graduate. He completed his basic and advanced mountaineering courses at Atal Bihari Vajpayee Institute of Mountaineering and Allied Sports, Manali.

== Career ==
Pandey scaled Mount Everest on 21 May 2016, where he recited the national anthem of India, Jana Gana Mana.

In September 2016, Pandey climbed Mount Damavand, Iran's highest mountain and Mount Sabalan, its third-highest mountain, in a mountaineering expedition organized by the International Climbing and Mountaineering Federation.

In April 2015, Pandey succeeded in climbing 22,000 feet of Mount Everest, but could not make it to the top of Everest due to an earthquake, which caused an avalanche and the death of 21 climbers. Pandey was trapped on the mountain after the earthquake; later he was rescued.

He set the Guinness World Record for the longest continuous ride standing on the seat of a motorcycle, by covering over 32.3 kilometers on a bike in a standing position. However, it was reported that the record was broken by members of the Indian Army in September 2016, but it is still registered in the name of Pandey in the official Guinness World Records.

In August 2018, Pandey climbed Mount Elbrus (18,511 ft) twice, and hoisted the flag of India and the flag of Sports and Youth Welfare Department of Madhya Pradesh on the eastern and western peaks.

He, along with Nihal Sarkar, represented India in the UIAA Ice Climbing World Cup 2017, held in Italy.

== Awards and recognition ==
- In November 2016, Pandey received the Khel Alankaran award from the Government of Madhya
- He is a Brand ambassador of Satna Smart City, Government of Madhya Pradesh, and is associated with government schools and colleges in the state, with a focus on sports education.
- In April 2017, he was appointed as Brand ambassador of Ambubachi Mela by the Assam Tourism Development Corporation.

== See also ==
- Mountaineering in India
- Indian summiters of Mount Everest - Year wise
- List of Mount Everest summiters by number of times to the summit
- List of Mount Everest records of India
- List of Mount Everest records
