= Nihal Sarkar =

Indian ice climber

Nihal Sarkar is an Indian ice climber who was the only Indian to participate in the 2016 UIAA Ice Climbing World Cup, held in South Korea. He made his competition debut during the Asian Championships in Cheongsong, South Korea.

He secured 24th world ranking among 90 athletes who participated from 18 countries around the world in 2016 at Cheongsong, South Korea and secured 12th place among 44th Asian Athletes in Asian Championships, 2016. His personal best in the Speed event in the world cup 2016 is still an Indian record.

Sarkar along with Ratnesh Pandey represented India in UIAA Ice Climbing World Cup 2017, held in Italy.
