= Deaf Enabled Foundation =

NGO for the deaf and disabled from India

DEF
- Deaf Enabled Foundation
- Formation: October 31, 2009; 17 years ago
- Founder: TKM Sandeep
- Founded at: Secunderabad
- Type: Nonprofit organisation
- Legal status: Active
- Headquarters: Hyderabad
- Location: India
- Region served: Maharashtra, Gujarat, Telangana, AndhraPradesh, Madhya Pradesh, Tamil Nadu and West Bengal
- Services: Education, Skill Training, Deaf Rights Advocacy, Sign Language Teaching, Placements
- Official language: Indian Sign Language and English
- Owner: TKM Sandeep
- Secretary General: S Hari Hara Kumar
- Director: Ramya Miryala
- Board of directors: Sujata Mandal, Sanjay Kumar Kankaria, Lakshmi Andalu, Murtaza TK, P Samuel, Ajit Sridhar Prabhu
- Subsidiaries: Talking Hands And Co.
- Website: https://def.org.in/

Deaf Enabled Foundation (DEF) is a non-profit organization founded in 2009. DEF is based in India and operates in several states, including Telangana, Andhra Pradesh, Tamil Nadu, Maharashtra, Madhya Pradesh, Gujarat, and West Bengal.: DEF is affiliated to National Association of the Deaf, India.

== History and mission ==
DEF was established by a group of deaf and non-deaf individuals in 2009. The foundation trains individuals in Indian Sign Language (ISL). They provide education, vocational training, and support services to deaf individuals. DEF aims to empower women through various initiatives focused on reproductive health, counselling, and legal awareness.

== Initiatives ==
DEF has the following initiatives

=== DEF ISL ===
DEF conducts individual classes and corporate workshops to create awareness about Indian Sign Language.

=== DEF Academy ===
DEF provides formal education assistance for deaf students pursuing intermediate and degree courses, collaborating with the Board of Intermediate, Telangana, and IGNOU.

=== DEF Skills ===
DEF offers vocational training in IT skills, English communication, and office readiness modules.

=== DEF Youth Advancement ===
This initiative includes leadership training, adventure camps, and sports tournaments for overall development.

=== DEF Child Outreach ===
DEF organises quizzes, painting competitions, and scholarships through the Helen Keller Academic Excellence Awards.

=== DEF Women ===
This program consists of reproductive health seminars, counselling sessions, legal awareness workshops, and other support services.

=== EduTech Initiatives ===
DEF has developed the DEF ISL App, a virtual dictionary with 70,000+ English words converted to Indian Sign Language, and the EduSign Academy, an online academic assistance platform that explains concepts in sign language for intermediate and degree deaf students. It also includes personality development and legal awareness modules.

== Recognition and awards ==
DEF has received the NCPEDP-SHELL HELEN KELLER Award in 2011.

== See also ==
- National Association of the Deaf, India
- Indian Sign Language
