= Anita Ghai =

Indian academic (born 1958)

Anita Ghai (23 October 1958 – 11 December 2024) was an Indian academic who was the president of Indian Association of Women's Studies. She was a professor at School of Human Studies, Ambedkar University, Delhi. She was also a disability rights activist in India working in the areas of sexuality, gender, health and education rights. She authored three books.

== Early life ==
Ghai was born on 23 October 1958. She was diagnosed with polio at the age of two. The polio vaccine came to India in 1959, one year after her birth.

== Academic work ==
Ghai was engaged in the field of disability studies for many years and her contribution to the field is considered seminal. Her volume, Disability in South Asia: Knowledge and Experience, is considered the first of its kind in South Asia. Ghai is pushing for disability studies to claim the status of a university discipline.

Ghai's book Rethinking Disability in India focussed on disability in India as a social, cultural and political phenomenon.

Ghai was also on the editorial board of Disability and Society and Scandinavian Journal of Disability.

== Activism ==
Ghai focussed on the specific concerns and experiences of disabled women. Ghai also wrote (Dis)embodied Form on the gendered politics of disability and its impact on feminist theory.

She held workshops on sexuality and disability, as part of an online course run by feminist organisation CREA. Ghai also advocates for sexuality education .

Ghai advocated for accessibility in India. She argued that access is crucial for allowing people with disabilities to secure their proper citizenship rights, and has spoken out against the Indian government's token efforts for people with disabilities. She also advocated against the lack of accessible toilets.

In January 2016, Ghai claimed that she was forced to crawl on the tarmac by Air India at Indira Gandhi Airport, New Delhi, as they failed to provide a wheelchair for her. The airline denied Ghai's allegation.

== Books ==
- Ghai, Anita (17 January 2019). Disability in South Asia: Knowledge and Experience. Sage Publications. ISBN 978-9352807079.
- Ghai, Anita (28 November 2017). Rethinking Disability in India. Routledge India. ISBN 9780815373216.
- Ghai, Anita (2003). (Dis)Embodied Form: Issues of Disabled Women. New Delhi: Har-Anand Publications. ISBN 81-241-0930-3.
