= Kayaking and canoeing on the River Thames =

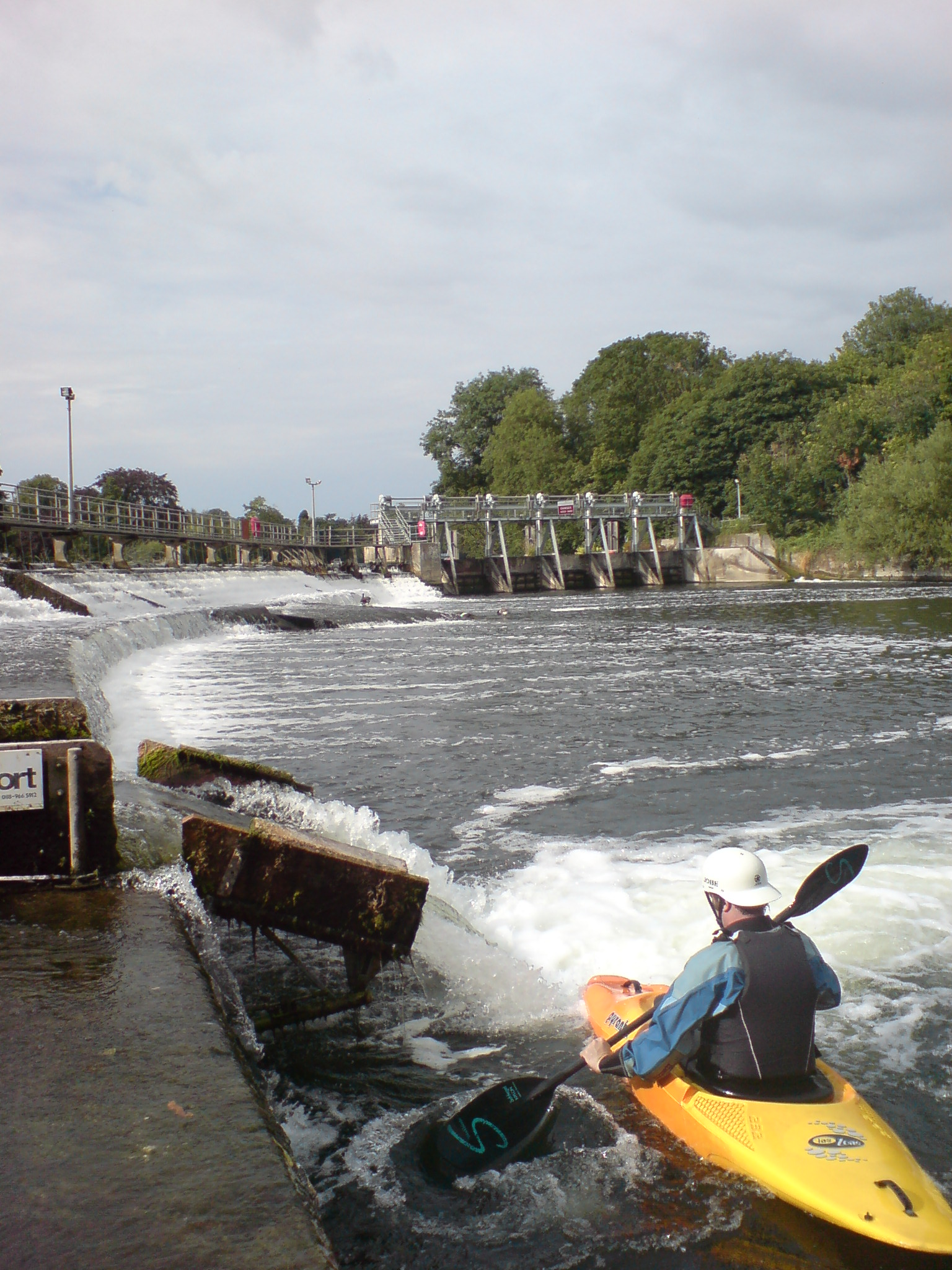
Kayaker by the Boulter's Weir flume during the summer

The River Thames in England is a very popular river for kayakers and canoeists, and is home to several canoe clubs, including the Royal Canoe Club which is the oldest canoe club in the world.

The tidal section is used by sea kayakers and experienced tourers. Above Teddington Lock in London the Thames is freshwater, with levels controlled by a series of weirs which are managed by the Environment Agency and can be used for whitewater and playboating by kayakers.

== See also ==
- Artificial whitewater
- Locks and weirs on the River Thames
