= Disability in India =

In India, persons with disabilities are referred to variously as specially abled persons, differently abled persons, divyangjan (divine body) and etc. The overall prevalence of people with disabilities is 4.52% of the population, i.e., 63.28 million, according to the ICMR's publication from the NFHS-5 survey 2019–21. India is a party to the United Nations Convention on the Rights of Persons with Disabilities. The legislations that affects people with disabilities in India includes the Rights of Persons with Disabilities Act, 2016, the Mental Health Care Act, 2017, the National Trust Act, 1999, and the Rehabilitation Council of India Act, 1992. People with disabilities in India are faced with negative social attitudes in the wider population.

== Prevalence ==
The number of people with disabilities in India was stated as 21 million in the 2001 Census of India. In the 2011 census, the figure rose by 22.4% to 26.8 million. According to the 2011 census, 20.3% of people with disabilities in India have movement disabilities, 18.9% have hearing impairments, and 18.8% have visual impairments. The 2011 census additionally collected data on mental disability for the first time, and found that 5.6% of Indians with disabilities fall into that category.

However, Anita Ghai offered a higher estimate in 2002, of 70 million. The World Health Organization's World Health Survey data from 2002 to 2004 gave a far higher estimate that 25% of people in India have some form of disability, much higher than the world average, but WHO has acknowledged that this survey had serious limitations. A 2009 World Bank report estimated that 5-8% of India's population had a disability.

Two analyses of data from a 2004 study in a rural area of Karnataka have estimated the rate of disability to be 6.3% and the rate of mental disability specifically to be around 2.3%. Data collected in a village in Chandigarh from 2004 to 2005 found the prevalence of disability to be 4.79%. A major study published in 2018 of five sites in India found that 9.2% of children aged 2–5 and 13.6% of children aged 6–9 had at least one of seven neurodevelopmental disorders (vision impairment, epilepsy, neuromotor impairments including cerebral palsy, hearing impairment, speech and language disorders, autism spectrum disorders, and intellectual disability).

== Legislation ==
=== International ===
India is a party to the United Nations Convention on the Rights of Persons with Disabilities, having signed the treaty on 30 March 2007 and ratified it on 1 October 2007.

=== National ===
India enacted the Persons with Disabilities (Equal Opportunity, Protection of Rights and Full Participation) Act in 1995 to provide recognition to the rights and special needs of disabled people in the country. It also provided for reservations for persons with disabilities in government jobs and higher educational institutions. The Rights of Persons with Disabilities Act, 2016 replaced the earlier legislation and increased the number of recognised disabilities from seven to 21. While the 1995 legislation had reserved 3% of government jobs, the new legislation reserves 4%. Under the new legislation, all institutions of higher education run or funded by the government must reserve 5% of their spaces for enrollment for people with disabilities.

The rights of persons with psychosocial disabilities are protected under the Mental Health Care Act, 2017. The Rehabilitation Council of India Act, 1992 created the Rehabilitation Council of India, which is tasked with training rehabilitation professionals and promoting research in rehabilitation and special education. Another law governing disability affairs in India is the National Trust for the Welfare of Persons with Autism, Cerebral Palsy, Mental Retardation and Multiple Disabilities Act, 1999, or simply National Trust Act. This law created the National Trust, which is a government body that works with volunteer networks and Disabled People's Organizations and also forms local-level committees that appoint legal guardians for people with disabilities deemed to need them.

== Government policy ==
Issues related to disability are addressed by the Department of Empowerment of Persons with Disabilities, which falls under the Ministry of Social Justice and Empowerment. The government of India has also enacted initiatives such as the Accessible India Campaign to make public spaces and transportation barrier-free for persons with disabilities.

The usage of the term Divyangjan ("those with divine abilities") has been promoted by Prime Minister Narendra Modi as an alternative to the term "Persons with Disability". However, disability rights activists have called it condescending and derogatory.

=== Accessibility in Transport ===
Significant legal challenges have shaped the accessibility of air travel in India. In 2006, activists Subrata Pramanick and Rajiv Ranjan filed a landmark complaint (Case No. 3197/2006) against Deccan Aviation (Air Deccan) before the Court of the Chief Commissioner for Persons with Disabilities. The case challenged the airline's practice of charging a "wheelchair tax" of ₹500 for mobility assistance. This litigation, cited in the company's 2006 SEBI prospectus, contributed to the eventual mandate that all Indian carriers provide wheelchair assistance to passengers with disabilities free of charge under Civil Aviation Requirements (CAR).

== Social attitudes ==
Attitudes towards disability vary considerably between regions and sub-cultures. While disabilities do not hold any universal social stigma, there are regions and sub-cultures which do not agree. In some places, people with disabilities are seen as wicked or deceitful, or as unable to progress to adulthood and dependent on charity and pity for assistance. In such scenarios, people with disabilities are often socially segregated, often as a results of ingrained cultural and religious attitudes toward disability.

=== Intersectional aspects ===
Most people with disabilities in India and their families are focused on survival in the context of deep poverty. India's disability rights movement, however, mainly comprises elite, middle-class activists who generally mirror the goals of the disability rights movement in Western countries.

Disability in India is affected by other social divisions such as class, gender, and caste. Statistics show that women with disabilities in India are more marginalized than their male counterparts. Anita Ghai argues that Indian feminism has ignored the unique conditions of women with disabilities.

== Culture ==
=== Cinema ===
India's Hindi-language cinema has often reinforced negative stereotypes about people with disabilities, but more recently it has produced several films that have helped raise awareness. A recurrent theme has for a long time been that disability is a punishment for misdeeds, for instance in Jeevan Naiya (1936), Aadmi (1968), and Dhanwan (1981). Characters with mental disabilities have frequently been used as comic relief, a trend which has been criticized by Dinesh Bhugra as reinforcing social stigma. Atanu Mohapatra identifies several ways in which women with disabilities are misrepresented in Hindi films as compared to men with disabilities: they are included less frequently, they very rarely win the love of able-bodied men despite the converse often being the case, they are much less likely to become self-supporting economically, and they are not included unless they are physically attractive.

The decade following 2005 has seen a shift in the representation of people with disabilities by Hindi cinema. The immediate cause for the shift appears to have been an international disability film festival in 2005 facilitated by the Ability Foundation (an Indian NGO). Black (2005) broke new ground by focusing on a female protagonist with a disability, a girl who is blind, deaf, and mute but succeeds academically after considerable struggle. Other films including Taare Zameen Par (2007) by famed actor and director Aamir Khan have explored the lives of people with dyslexia, progeria, Asperger syndrome, and amnesia, among other conditions. There were some earlier precedents to these more well-rounded portrayals, including Koshish (1972) and Sparsh (1980), which explored deafness and blindness respectively. Conversely, some recent Hindi films have continued to display ill-founded stereotypes about people with disabilities.

In addition, some Tamil film industry movies have portrayed people with disabilities, like the movie Deiva Thirumagal, which depicts a father who is neurodivergent and his daughter.

=== Sport ===
India made its Summer Paralympic début at the 1968 Games, competed again in 1972, and then was absent until the 1984 Games. The country has participated in every edition of the Summer Games since then. It has never participated in the Winter Paralympic Games.
