= We Care Film Festival =

Film festival

The We Care Film Festival is an effort by the Indian organization Brotherhood, in partnership with UNESCO, to raise awareness and to dispel stereotypes about people with disabilities.

== Background ==
According to the United Nations, one billion people in the world constitute the largest global minority, people with disabilities. Of this population, 40-80 million reside in India. India plays an active role in the disability rights movement and has ratified and signed the United Nations Convention on the Rights of Persons with Disabilities in 2007. However, it does not adequately address the challenges faced by these groups of people, such as lack of accessibility throughout the country. Another crucial issue is the promotion of negative stereotypes about disability in films, like those from Bollywood.

== Overview ==
Brotherhood is an organization that has been actively fighting for the rights of disabled communities since 2002. They have pioneered the disability rights movement by carrying out conversations, and taking advantage of the influence of audio-visual media. Through various initiatives, they strive to utilize documentaries and film to dispel stereotypes and misconceptions pertaining to disabilities, and to raise awareness among the Indian public as well as global audiences.

Drawing on the aforementioned UN treaty, Brotherhood - in collaboration with the United Nations Information Centre for India and Bhutan, UNESCO, National Trust (a Statutory Body of the Ministry of Social Justice and Empowerment) and Apeejay Institute of Mass Communication - organize the We Care Film Festival every year. This year marked the festival's thirteenth year, a milestone because it is the only international film festival that is officially recognized as a UNESCO partner, according to the New Delhi Declaration, which was adopted by UNESCO and signed by 203 countries as of November 2015.

== Viewpoints ==
Dr. Sushma Batra, Professor of Social Work at the University at Delhi, and K. Kannan, a New Delhi-based journalist, are advocates of the movement toward disability rights. They write:

While there are people who believe in the power of cinema to change the world, there are others who say that its chief purpose is to entertain people. And so, the disability experience too has been twisted and distorted to suit the dynamics of entertainment by many film-makers across the globe. And there have been some who have used films to highlight the reality of the disability experience and the diversity it brings to the world, how coping-up mechanisms highlight the triumph of spirit over the body and so on.

Kannan and Dr. Batra acknowledge the strong sphere of influence that cinema has in societies, nationally and internationally. They point out that due to the goal of entertaining the masses, filmmakers undermine the experiences of disabled populations through some very negative stereotypes and tropes. Many Bollywood films either over-dramatize disabled characters or mock them through cartoon-esque and pity-inducing depictions.

== Common tropes ==
This section will examine common tropes – highlighted by Kannan and Dr. Batra – employed by filmmakers in Bollywood film, notions that this film festival seeks to dispel.

Disabled characters may be utilized as a comic interlude for the entertainment of audiences. A film series that perfectly illustrates this is Golmaal. They may be regarded with pity and a sense of condescension. The trope, a patronizing attitude, is used to paint the "hero" or protagonist of a film in a positive light by means of looking down upon the disabled character. Disability has been used by filmmakers as a convenience to enhance the plot of the story. An example is Koyla (1997 film).

Some films depict disabled characters as heroes, which can be very problematic. Through the language and behaviors used in certain films, disabled peoples are portrayed as being liabilities and burdensome unproductive members of society.

Films may downplay the magnitude of disabilities by imparting the idea that there are "quick fixes" to an individual's disabilities, like Deewane Huye Paagal (2005 film). Lastly, films portray disabled peoples as being "cured" by external forces, such as by aliens in Koi... Mil Gaya (2003 film).
