= Jeeja Ghosh =

Indian disability rights activist

- Education: Presidency College, Delhi University
- Occupations: Social activist, Works for disabled person

Jeeja Ghosh is an Indian disability rights activist. She was born with cerebral palsy, a condition caused by lack of oxygen to the brain either during pregnancy or at the time of delivery.

== Early life and education ==
She completed her schooling at the Indian Institute of Cerebral palsy and La Martiniere for Girls, Calcutta. She graduated with Honours in Sociology from Presidency College. She is a qualified social worker (MSW) from the Delhi School of Social work, Delhi University. In 2006 she completed her second masters in Disability Studies from Leeds University, UK.

== Career ==
Ghosh is a disability advocate involved in national and international advocacy. In 2009, she received the Shri N.D. Diwan Memorial Award for Outstanding Professional Services in Rehabilitation of Persons with Disabilities by the National Society for Equal Opportunities of the Handicapped, Mumbai. In 2009, she received the Role Model Award from the Office of the Disability Commissioner, Government of West Bengal.

She worked for the Indian Institute of Cerebral Palsy, in Kolkata, as the Head of Advocacy and Disability Studies. She has been involved as a consultant with CREA and TARSHI, both gender right-based organizations. she has also worked on with the Human Rights Law Network as the coordinator of the Disability Rights Initiative for the Eastern Zone. She currently EnAble India in Bangalore.

She was the first elected board member of the National Trust (a statuary body under the Government of India) for persons with autism, cerebral palsy, multiple disabilities and intellectual disability from 2008 to 2011. She served president of the International Society for Augmentative and Alternative Communication (ISAAC) India Chapter from May 2017 to July 2018. She was involved in the writing of the Parallel Report on the United Nations Convention on the Rights of Persons with Disabilities (UNCRPD) as a member of Women with Disabilities India Network. She represented the Civil Society as a part of Indian delegation to the hearing of the India Country Report on UNCRPD in the 22nd Session of the United Nation in Geneva in September 2019.

She was the State Icon for the State of West Bengal of Election Commission of India.

Jeeja’s interests also lies in writing and creative arts. She has also acted as a lead supporting character in a film called One Little Finger: Ability in Disability directed by Dr. Rupam Sarmah. I Am Jeeja, a documentary made on her life directed by Swati Chakraborty and produced by PSBT, won the National Film Festival award for the best film on social issues in the non-feature film category. A collection of her poems River of time was published in 2017. She is also a part of an inclusive theatre group Katha Kalam and is a part of their production Black Hole are Not Black, a play based on the Nirbhaya incident. She was the State Election Icon for West Bengal and won the Best Icon award in 2022.

== SpiceJet case ==
In 2012, she was removed from a flight by SpiceJet, which resulted in a court case that reached the Supreme Court of India. The Court awarded Rs 10 lakh in damages due to violation of Rules,1937; violation of Civil Aviation Requirements 2008 guidelines; and unreasonable discrimination.
