= Directorate Sports and Youth Welfare =

Madhya Pradesh, India state government department

Coordinates: 22.973423°N 78.656894°E

Sports & Youth Welfare overview
- Type: Public
- Jurisdiction: Government of Madhya Pradesh
- Headquarters: Tatya Tope Stadium, South TT Nagar, Bhopal, Madhya Pradesh 462003
- Motto: Youth Welfare & Sports Development
- Minister responsible: Shri.Vishwas Kailash Sarang
- Sports & Youth Welfare executive: Mr.Manu Shrivastava (IAS)
- Parent department: Government of Madhya Pradesh
- Website: dsywmp.gov.in

Directorate Sports and Youth Welfare also known as Department of Sports & Youth Welfare is one of the department of state government of Madhya Pradesh, India, entitled for the development in the field of sports and youth welfare.

== Objective & Functions of the Department ==
- Directorate Sports and Youth Welfare functions as the vital Department for the development of Backward Classes of the society and minority communities in the state of Madhya Pradesh.
- One of the major function and objective of this department is to frame the policies and laws for the development of the sports as well as the welfare of the youth.
- It also aims to control the poverty while providing employment to the people and implementing various welfare programmes and schemes to achieve the above objective.

== Sports ==
The department organizes various inter-state, national and even international sports events, these are-

- Cricket
- Football
- Basketball
- Volleyball
- Cycling
- Swimming
- Trekking
- Badminton
- Table tennis

Indian originated games like Kho kho, Gulli Danda, Pittu Garam (Sitoliya) and Langdi are popular in the rural areas.

=== Coaches & trainers ===
- Cricket : Madan Lal was appointed as chief coach of the Madhya Pradesh Cricket Academy (MPCA) by the Directorate Sports and Youth Welfare.
