= National Association of the Deaf (India) =

The National Association of the Deaf (India) is an organisation for the deaf in India founded in 2005. The goal of N.A.D. is the organisation and education India's deaf population. The N.A.D.(INDIA) promotes the use of Indian Sign Language. The N.A.D.(INDIA) currently has over 2,500 members. N.A.D.(INDIA) aims to rally deaf people in order to demand their rights from the Government and policy makers. The rights of the deaf in India have been trampled upon without any organisation raising its voice and providing any relief to the deaf community in any sustainable tangible way and what little has been done is only scratching the surface of the urban deaf population. The signing deaf community has no real status within society. The N.A.D. is affiliated with the World Federation of the Deaf (WFD) as an Associate Membership.
