= List of sitting judges of the high courts of India =

There are 25 high courts in India. The total number of judges in these courts is 1122, of which 847 judges are permanent. As of 29 October 2026, 292 of the seats, about 26.02% are vacant.

Allahabad High Court has the largest number (160) of high court judges while Sikkim High Court has the smallest number (3). The lists of high court judges are maintained by the Ministry of Law and Justice.

== Sanctioned, working and vacant posts of judges in each high court ==
High Court	Jurisdiction	Principal seat	Permanent judges	Additional judges	Total judges	Current Working	Current Vacancies
Allahabad High Court	Uttar Pradesh	Prayagraj	119	41	160	104	56
Andhra Pradesh High Court	Andhra Pradesh	Amaravati	28	9	37	30	7
Bombay High Court	Maharashtra, Goa, Dadra and Nagar Haveli and Daman and Diu	Mumbai	71	23	94	75	19
Calcutta High Court	West Bengal, Andaman and Nicobar Islands	Kolkata	54	18	72	49	23
Chhattisgarh High Court	Chhattisgarh	Bilaspur	17	5	22	13	9
Delhi High Court	National Capital Territory of Delhi	Delhi	45	15	60	49	11
Gauhati High Court	Assam, Arunachal Pradesh, Mizoram, Nagaland	Guwahati	22	8	30	26	4
Gujarat High Court	Gujarat	Ahmedabad	39	13	52	33	19
Himachal Pradesh High Court	Himachal Pradesh	Shimla	13	4	17	15	2
Jammu and Kashmir and Ladakh High Court	Jammu and Kashmir, Ladakh	Srinagar/Jammu	19	6	25	14	11
Jharkhand High Court	Jharkhand	Ranchi	20	5	25	16	9
Karnataka High Court	Karnataka	Bangalore	47	15	62	57	5
Kerala High Court	Kerala, Lakshadweep	Kochi	35	12	47	36	11
Madhya Pradesh High Court	Madhya Pradesh	Jabalpur	40	13	53	38	15
Madras High Court	Tamil Nadu, Pondicherry	Chennai	56	19	75	67	8
Manipur High Court	Manipur	Imphal	4	1	5	3	2
Meghalaya High Court	Meghalaya	Shillong	4	0	4	4	0
Orissa High Court	Odisha	Cuttack	24	9	33	15	18
Patna High Court	Bihar	Patna	40	13	53	44	9
Punjab and Haryana High Court	Punjab, Haryana, Chandigarh	Chandigarh	64	21	85	64	21
Rajasthan High Court	Rajasthan	Jodhpur	38	12	50	38	12
Sikkim High Court	Sikkim	Gangtok	3	0	3	2	1
Telangana High Court	Telangana	Hyderabad	32	10	42	27	15
Tripura High Court	Tripura	Agartala	4	1	5	4	1
Uttarakhand High Court	Uttarakhand	Nainital	9	2	11	7	4
Total			847	275	1122	830	292

== High Court Population ==
S.No.	High Court	Jurisdiction	Authorised Judges	Population	Population per Judge
1	Allahabad High Court	Uttar Pradesh	160	241,066,874	1,506,668
2	Andhra Pradesh High Court	Andhra Pradesh	37	53,340,000	1,441,622
3	Bombay High Court	Maharashtra, Goa, Dadra and Nagar Haveli, Daman and Diu	94	129,768,587	1,380,517
4	Calcutta High Court	West Bengal, Andaman and Nicobar Islands	72	99,967,000	1,388,431
5	Chhattisgarh High Court	Chhattisgarh	22	30,524,000	1,387,455
6	Delhi High Court	Delhi	60	21,752,000	362,533
7	Gauhati High Court	Assam, Arunachal Pradesh, Mizoram, Nagaland	30	41,126,000	1,370,867
8	Gujarat High Court	Gujarat	52	72,367,000	1,391,673
9	Himachal Pradesh High court	Himachal Pradesh	17	7,505,000	441,471
10	Jammu & Kashmir and Ladakh High Court	Jammu and Kashmir, Ladakh	25	14,003,000	560,120
11	Jharkhand High Court	Jharkhand	25	39,963,000	1,598,520
12	Karnataka High Court	Karnataka	62	68,115,000	1,098,629
13	Kerala High Court	Kerala, Lakshdweep	47	35,989,000	765,723
14	Madhya Pradesh High Court	Madhya Pradesh	53	87,610,000	1,653,019
15	Madras High Court	Tamil Nadu, Pondicherry	75	78,480,163	1,046,402
16	Manipur High Court	Manipur	5	3,260,000	652,000
17	Meghaliya High Court	Meghaliya	4	3,379,000	844,750
18	Orissa High Court	Odisha	33	46,566,000	1,411,091
19	Patna High Court	Bihar	53	128,592,000	2,426,264
20	Punjab and Haryana High Court	Punjab, Haryana, Chandigarh	85	62,742,000	738,141
21	Rajasthan High Court	Rajasthan	50	81,897,000	1,637,940
22	Sikkim High Court	Sikkim	3	695,000	231,667
23	Telangana High Court	Telangana	42	38,272,000	911,238
24	Tripura High Court	Tripura	5	4,184,000	836,800
25	Uttarakhand High Court	Uttarakhand	11	11,755,000	1,068,636

== Allahabad High Court ==
The Allahabad High Court in the state of Uttar Pradesh can have 119 permanent judges as well as 41 additional judges, bringing its total sanctioned strength to 160 judges. According to the high court's website, currently it has 101 judges.

Permanent judges
Name of the Judge	Source	Date of Appointment as Addl. Judge	Date of Appointment As Pmt. Judge	Date of retirement	Remarks	Nominated as Judge by
Arun Bhansali (CJ)	Bar	8 January 2013	7 January 2015	14 October 2029	CJ w.e.f. 05.02.2024 (PHC: Rajasthan)	Altamas Kabir
Arindam Sinha	Bar	30 October 2013	14 March 2016	21 September 2027	Joined on 07.04.2025 (PHC: Calcutta)	Palanisamy Sathasivam
Rajan Roy	Bar	3 February 2014	1 February 2016	14 August 2027		Palanisamy Sathasivam
Yashwant Varma	Bar	13 October 2014	1 February 2016	5 January 2031		H. L. Dattu
Atul Sreedharan	Bar	7 April 2016	17 March 2018	24 May 2028	Joined on 11.11.2025 (PHC: MP)	Tirath Singh Thakur
Siddhartha Varma	Bar	15 November 2016	23 March 2018	18 September 2029		Tirath Singh Thakur
Sangeeta Chandra	Bar	15 November 2016	23 March 2018	22 April 2030		Tirath Singh Thakur
Saumitra Dayal Singh	Bar	20 February 2017	14 March 2018	19 December 2031		Jagdish Singh Khehar
Shekhar B. Saraf	Bar	21 September 2017	16 September 2019	20 October 2033	Joined on 17.11.2023 (PHC: Calcutta)	Dipak Misra
Salil Kumar Rai	Bar	22 September 2017	6 September 2019	7 August 2027		Dipak Misra
Rajesh Singh Chauhan	Bar	22 September 2017	6 September 2019	17 July 2028		Dipak Misra
Irshad Ali	Bar	22 September 2017	18 March 2020	11 December 2026		Dipak Misra
Jahangir Jamshed Munir	Bar	22 September 2017	6 September 2019	22 August 2029		Dipak Misra
Rajiv Gupta	Bar	22 September 2017	6 September 2019	21 October 2028		Dipak Misra
Siddharth	Bar	22 September 2017	6 September 2019	14 April 2027		Dipak Misra
Ajit Kumar	Bar	22 September 2017	6 September 2019	21 December 2030		Dipak Misra
Rajnish Kumar	Bar	22 September 2017	6 September 2019	9 August 2031		Dipak Misra
Abdul Moin	Bar	22 September 2017	6 September 2019	31 October 2030		Dipak Misra
Rajeev Misra	Bar	22 September 2017	6 September 2019	19 January 2031		Dipak Misra
Chandra Dhari Singh	Bar	22 September 2017	6 September 2019	11 July 2031		Dipak Misra
Ajay Bhanot	Bar	22 September 2017	6 September 2019	3 August 2031		Dipak Misra
Manoj Bajaj	Bar	29 October 2018	11 September 2020	22 June 2028	Joined on 24.07.2023 (PHC: P&H)	Dipak Misra
Prakash Padia	Bar	22 November 2018	20 November 2020	9 March 2027		Dipak Misra
Pankaj Bhatia	Bar	22 November 2018	20 November 2020	14 September 2028		Dipak Misra
Saurabh Lavania	Bar	22 November 2018	20 November 2020	16 April 2028		Dipak Misra
Vivek Varma	Bar	22 November 2018	20 November 2020	28 December 2031		Dipak Misra
Piyush Agrawal	Bar	22 November 2018	20 November 2020	5 November 2033		Dipak Misra
Saurabh Shyam Shamsherry	Bar	22 November 2018	20 November 2020	3 February 2031		Dipak Misra
Jaspreet Singh	Bar	22 November 2018	20 November 2020	28 August 2033		Dipak Misra
Rajeev Singh	Bar	22 November 2018	20 November 2020	2 April 2030		Dipak Misra
Manju Rani Chauhan	Bar	22 November 2018	20 November 2020	28 August 2028		Dipak Misra
Karunesh Singh Pawar	Bar	22 November 2018	20 November 2020	18 May 2033		Dipak Misra
Yogendra Kumar Srivastava	Bar	22 November 2018	20 November 2020	29 December 2027		Dipak Misra
Manish Mathur	Bar	22 November 2018	20 November 2020	8 June 2034		Dipak Misra
Rohit Ranjan Agarwal	Bar	22 November 2018	20 November 2020	4 July 2033		Dipak Misra
Rajbeer Singh	Service	22 November 2018	20 November 2020	5 December 2026		Ranjan Gogoi
Deepak Verma	Bar	12 December 2019	26 March 2021	29 March 2027		Ranjan Gogoi
Dinesh Pathak	Bar	12 December 2019	26 March 2021	6 January 2034		Ranjan Gogoi
Manish Kumar	Bar	12 December 2019	26 March 2021	15 September 2032		Ranjan Gogoi
Samit Gopal	Bar	12 December 2019	26 March 2021	29 December 2033		Ranjan Gogoi
Sanjay Kumar Pachori	Service	16 September 2020	21 June 2022	28 February 2027		S. A. Bobde
Chandra Kumar Rai	Bar	13 October 2021	13 March 2023	14 October 2027		N. V. Ramana
Krishan Pahal	Bar	13 October 2021	13 March 2023	22 June 2030		N. V. Ramana
Sameer Jain	Bar	13 October 2021	13 March 2023	25 February 2030		N. V. Ramana
Ashutosh Srivastava	Bar	13 October 2021	13 March 2023	2 December 2026		N. V. Ramana
Subhash Vidyarthi	Bar	13 October 2021	13 March 2023	29 April 2032		N. V. Ramana
Brij Raj Singh	Bar	13 October 2021	13 March 2023	6 August 2032		N. V. Ramana
Shree Prakash Singh	Bar	13 October 2021	13 March 2023	7 February 2036		N. V. Ramana
Vikas Budhwar	Bar	13 October 2021	13 March 2023	27 June 2035		N. V. Ramana
Vikram D Chauhan	Bar	27 October 2021	13 March 2023	22 September 2036		N. V. Ramana
Saurabh Srivastava	Bar	3 August 2022	21 March 2024	29 July 2037		N. V. Ramana
Syed Qamar Hasan Rizvi	Bar	7 February 2023	23 August 2024	18 November 2029		D. Y. Chandrachud
Manish Kumar Nigam	Bar	7 February 2023	23 August 2024	14 June 2029		D. Y. Chandrachud
Anish Kumar Gupta	Bar	7 February 2023	23 August 2024	2 January 2036		D. Y. Chandrachud
Nand Prabha Shukla	Bar	7 February 2023	23 August 2024	29 June 2035		D. Y. Chandrachud
Kshitij Shailendra	Bar	7 February 2023	23 August 2024	13 July 2037		D. Y. Chandrachud
Vinod Diwakar	Bar	7 February 2023	23 August 2024	14 September 2038		D. Y. Chandrachud
Prashant Kumar	Bar	27 February 2023	23 August 2024	29 May 2029		D. Y. Chandrachud
Manjive Shukla	Bar	27 February 2023	23 August 2024	7 November 2033		D. Y. Chandrachud
Arun Kumar Singh Deshwal	Bar	27 February 2023	23 August 2024	6 July 2035		D. Y. Chandrachud
Praveen Kumar Giri	Bar	--	27 January 2025	19 January 2037		Sanjiv Khanna
Jitendra Kumar sinha	Service	--	18 April 2025	27 May 2031		Sanjiv Khanna
Anil Kumar-X	Service	--	18 April 2025	20 April 2033		Sanjiv Khanna
Sandeep Jain	Service	--	18 April 2025	28 November 2027		Sanjiv Khanna
Avnish Saxena	Service	--	18 April 2025	7 February 2033		Sanjiv Khanna
Madan Pal Singh	Service	--	18 April 2025	1 January 2033		Sanjiv Khanna
Harvir Singh	Service	--	18 April 2025	12 March 2029		Sanjiv Khanna
Pramod Kumar Srivastava	Service	--	7 August 2025	4 January 2027		B. R. Gavai
Abdul Shahid	Service	--	7 August 2025	5 July 2030		Sanjiv Khanna
Santosh Rai	Service	--	7 August 2025	30 June 2034		B. R. Gavai
Tej Pratap Tiwari	Service	--	7 August 2025	1 August 2033		Sanjiv Khanna
Zafeer Ahmad	Service	--	7 August 2025	29 January 2032		B. R. Gavai
Arun Kumar	Bar	--	3 September 2025	2 April 2034		D. Y. Chandrachud
Amitabh Kumar Rai	Bar	--	8 September 2025	3 June 2031		Sanjiv Khanna
Rajiv Lochan Shukla	Bar	--	8 September 2025	2 August 2040		Sanjiv Khanna
Vivek Saran	Bar	--	27 September 2025	30 October 2032		B. R. Gavai
Vivek Kumar Singh	Bar	--	27 September 2025	7 October 2037		B. R. Gavai
Garima Prashad	Bar	--	27 September 2025	22 October 2036		B. R. Gavai
Sudhanshu Chauhan	Bar	--	27 September 2025	9 July 2035		B. R. Gavai
Abdhesh Kumar Chaudhary	Bar	--	27 September 2025	19 December 2035		B. R. Gavai
Swarupama Chaturvedi	Bar	--	27 September 2025	31 December 2039		B. R. Gavai
Siddharth Nandan	Bar	--	27 September 2025	25 May 2040		B. R. Gavai
Kunal Ravi Singh	Bar	--	27 September 2025	10 June 2041		B. R. Gavai
Indrajeet Shukla	Bar	--	27 September 2025	30 June 2040		B. R. Gavai
Satya Veer Singh	Bar	--	27 September 2025	6 July 2039		B. R. Gavai
Ajay Kumar-II	Service	--	27 September 2025	5 June 2034		B. R. Gavai
Chawan Prakash	Service	--	27 September 2025	4 July 2033		B. R. Gavai
Divesh Chandra Samant	Service	--	27 September 2025	4 February 2028		B. R. Gavai
Prashant Mishra-I	Service	--	27 September 2025	24 December 2034		B. R. Gavai
Tarun Saxena	Service	--	27 September 2025	10 January 2034		B. R. Gavai
Rajeev Bharti	Service	--	27 September 2025	20 January 2033		B. R. Gavai
Padam Narayan Mishra	Service	--	27 September 2025	2 October 2032		B. R. Gavai
Lakshmi Kant Shukla	Service	--	27 September 2025	1 July 2034		B. R. Gavai
Jai Prakash Tiwari	Service	--	27 September 2025	1 January 2034		B. R. Gavai
Devendra Singh-I	Service	--	27 September 2025	13 November 2030		B. R. Gavai
Sanjiv Kumar	Service	--	27 September 2025	7 February 2028		B. R. Gavai
Vani Ranjan Agrawal	Service	--	27 September 2025	20 September 2027		B. R. Gavai
Achal Sachdev	Service	--	27 September 2025	30 December 2031		B. R. Gavai
Babita Rani	Service	--	27 September 2025	23 April 2035		B. R. Gavai
Vinai Kumar Dwivedi	Service	--	17 October 2025	31 October 2028		B. R. Gavai
Jai Krishna Upadhyay	Bar	--	7 January 2026	13 August 2034		B. R. Gavai

Additional judges
Name of Addl. Judge	Source	Date of appointment	Date of expiry of present term	Nominated as Judge by
--	--	--	--	--

Judges transferred from the Allahabad High Court
Name of the Judge	Source	Date of Appointment as Addl. Judge	Date of Appointment As Pmt. Judge	Date of retirement	Remarks
Mahesh Chandra Tripathi	Bar	27 September 2013	10 April 2015	20 June 2028	CJ of Bombay
Ashwani Kumar Mishra	Bar	3 February 2014	1 February 2016	15 November 2030	CJ of Punjab & Haryana
Vivek Chaudhary	Bar	20 February 2017	14 March 2018	12 May 2028	Transferred to Delhi
Jayant Banerji	Bar	22 September 2017	6 September 2019	16 January 2027	Transferred to Karnataka
Dinesh Kumar Singh	Bar	22 September 2017	6 September 2019	17 August 2028	Transferred to Karnataka
Vivek Kumar Singh	Bar	22 September 2017	6 September 2019	24 March 2030	Transferred to MP
Sanjay Kumar Singh	Bar	22 November 2018	20 November 2020	20 January 2031	Transferred to Patna
Ravi Nath Tilhari	Bar	12 December 2019	26 March 2021	8 February 2031	Transferred to AP
Shamim Ahmed	Bar	12 December 2019	26 March 2021	7 March 2028	Transferred to Madras
Om Prakash Shukla	Bar	3 August 2022	21 March 2024	19 April 2039	Transferred to Delhi

Current Judges elevated to Supreme Court
Name of the Judge	Image	Date of Appointment as Judge	Date of elevation to Supreme Court	Date of retirement
Vikram Nath		24 September 2004	31 August 2021	23 September 2027
Manoj Misra		21 November 2011	6 February 2023	1 June 2030
Sunita Agarwal		21 November 2011	6 October 2026	29 April 2031
Devendra Kumar Upadhyaya		21 November 2011	6 October 2026	15 June 2030

== Andhra Pradesh High Court ==
The Andhra Pradesh High Court sits at Amaravati, the capital of the state of Andhra Pradesh, and can have maximum of 37 judges, of which 28 must be permanently appointed and 9 may be additionally appointed. The court currently has 30 judges.

Permanent judges
Name of the Judge	Source	Date of Appointment as Addl. Judge	Date of Appointment As Pmt. Judge	Date of retirement	Remarks	Nominated as Judge by
Lisa Gill (CJ)	Bar	31 March 2014	19 December 2014	16 November 2028	CJ w.e.f. 25.04.2026 (PHC: P&H)	P. Sathasivam
Ravi Nath Tilhari	Bar	12 December 2019	26 March 2021	8 February 2031	Joined on 18.10.2021 (PHC: Allahabad)	Ranjan Gogoi
Battu Devanand	Bar	--	13 January 2020	13 April 2028		Ranjan Gogoi
Donadi Ramesh	Bar	--	13 January 2020	26 June 2027		Ranjan Gogoi
Nainala Jayasurya	Bar	--	13 January 2020	26 August 2030		Ranjan Gogoi
Boppudi Krishna Mohan	Bar	--	2 May 2020	4 February 2027		S. A. Bobde
Kanchireddy Suresh Reddy	Bar	--	2 May 2020	6 December 2026		S. A. Bobde
Boddupalli Sri Bhanumathi	Service	--	8 December 2021	30 August 2030		N. V. Ramana
Konakanti Sreenivasa Reddy	Bar	--	14 February 2022	2 June 2028		N. V. Ramana
Venkateswarlu Nimmagadda	Bar	--	14 February 2022	30 June 2029		N. V. Ramana
Tarlada Rajasekhar Rao	Bar	--	14 February 2022	2 August 2029		N. V. Ramana
Satti Subba Reddy	Bar	--	14 February 2022	4 February 2032		N. V. Ramana
Ravi Cheemalapati	Bar	--	14 February 2022	3 December 2029		N. V. Ramana
Vaddiboyana Sujatha	Bar	--	14 February 2022	9 September 2028		N. V. Ramana
Subhendu Samanta	Service	18 May 2022	28 April 2025	24 November 2033	Joined on 29.10.2025 (PHC: Calcutta)	S. A. Bobde
Venkata Jyothirmai Pratapa	Service	27 January 2023	28 August 2024	31 July 2034		D. Y. Chandrachud
Harinath Nunepally	Bar	21 October 2023	13 August 2025	11 January 2034		D. Y. Chandrachud
Kiranmayee Mandava	Bar	21 October 2023	13 August 2025	29 July 2032		D. Y. Chandrachud
Sumathi Jagadam	Bar	21 October 2023	13 August 2025	27 June 2033		D. Y. Chandrachud
Nyapathy Vijay	Bar	21 October 2023	13 August 2025	7 August 2036		D. Y. Chandrachud
Maheswara Rao Kuncheam	Bar	28 October 2024	5 October 2026	11 August 2035		D. Y. Chandrachud
Thoota Chandra Dhana Sekar	Bar	28 October 2024	5 October 2026	9 June 2037		D. Y. Chandrachud
Challa Gunaranjan	Bar	28 October 2024	5 October 2026	11 July 2038		D. Y. Chandrachud
Avadhanam Hari Haranadha Sarma	Service	24 January 2025	5 October 2026	15 April 2030		Sanjiv Khanna
Yadavalli Lakshmana Rao	Service	24 January 2025	5 October 2026	2 August 2037		Sanjiv Khanna

Additional judges
Name of Addl. Judge	Source	Date of appointment	Date of expiry of present term	Nominated as Judge by
Tuhin Kumar Gedela	Bar	4 August 2025	3 August 2027	B. R. Gavai
Balaji Medamalli	Bar	12 February 2026	11 February 2028	Surya Kant
Sunitha Gandham	Service	6 July 2026	5 July 2028	Surya Kant
Alapati Giridhar	Service	6 July 2026	5 July 2028	Surya Kant
Purushottam Kumaar Chintalapudi	Service	6 July 2026	5 July 2028	Surya Kant

Judges transferred from the Andhra Pradesh High Court
Name of the Judge	Source	Date of Appointment as Addl. Judge	Date of Appointment As Pmt. Judge	Date of retirement	Remarks
Lalitha Kanneganti	Bar	--	2 May 2020	4 May 2033	Transferred to Karnataka
Kumbhajadala Manmadha Rao	Bar	--	8 December 2021	12 June 2028	Transferred to Karnataka

Current Judges elevated to Supreme Court
Name of the Judge	Image	Date of Appointment as Judge	Date of elevation to Supreme Court	Date of retirement
Sarasa Venkatanarayana Bhatti		12 April 2013	14 July 2023	5 May 2027

== Bombay High Court ==
The Bombay High Court sits at Mumbai, the capital of the state of Maharashtra, and has additional benches in Aurangabad and Nagpur in Maharashtra, as well as Panaji in the state of Goa. It may have a maximum of 94 judges, of which 71 must be permanently appointed and 23 may be additionally appointed. Currently, it has a total of 76 Judges.

Permanent judges
Name of the Judge	Source	Date of Appointment as Addl. Judge	Date of Appointment As Pmt. Judge	Date of retirement	Remarks	Nominated as Judge by
Mahesh Chandra Tripathi (CJ)	Bar	27 September 2013	10 April 2015	20 June 2028	CJ w.e.f. 09.09.2026 (PHC: Allahabad)	P. Sathasivam
Ajey Shrikant Gadkari	Bar	6 January 2014	2 March 2016	13 June 2027		P. Sathasivam
Girish Sharadchandra Kulkarni	Bar	6 January 2014	2 March 2016	23 June 2030		P. Sathasivam
Burgess Pesi Colabawalla	Bar	6 January 2014	2 March 2016	15 December 2029		P. Sathasivam
Suman Shyam	Bar	7 January 2015	3 January 2017	11 June 2031	Joined on 21.07.2025 (PHC: Gauhati)	H. L. Dattu
Makarand Subhash Karnik	Bar	17 March 2016	13 March 2018	9 February 2031		T. S. Thakur
Bharati Harish Dangre	Bar	5 June 2017	12 April 2019	9 May 2030		J.S. Khehar
Sarang Vijaykumar Kotwal	Bar	5 June 2017	12 April 2019	12 April 2030		J.S. Khehar
Riyaz Iqbal Chagla	Bar	5 June 2017	12 April 2019	21 October 2031		J.S. Khehar
Manish Pitale	Bar	5 June 2017	12 April 2019	10 September 2032		J.S. Khehar
Shriram Madhusudan Modak	Service	11 October 2018	14 September 2020	12 November 2027		Dipak Misra
Nijamoddin Jahiroddin Jamadar	Service	11 October 2018	14 September 2020	21 September 2034		Dipak Misra
Nitin Bhagawantrao Suryawanshi	Bar	23 August 2019	1 June 2021	29 May 2028		Ranjan Gogoi
Anil Satyavijay Kilor	Bar	23 August 2019	1 June 2021	2 September 2028		Ranjan Gogoi
Milind Narendra Jadhav	Bar	23 August 2019	1 June 2021	13 August 2031		Ranjan Gogoi
Nitin Rudrasen Borkar	Service	5 December 2019	1 June 2021	1 August 2033		Ranjan Gogoi
Madhav Jayajirao Jamdar	Bar	7 January 2020	5 January 2022	12 January 2029		Ranjan Gogoi
Amit Bhalchandra Borkar	Bar	14 January 2020	5 January 2022	1 January 2034		Ranjan Gogoi
Abhay Ahuja	Bar	4 March 2020	25 January 2024	23 August 2031		Ranjan Gogoi
Shivkumar Ganpatrao Dige	Service	25 June 2021	9 March 2023	2 August 2033		S. A. Bobde
Anil Laxman Pansare	Service	21 October 2021	4 August 2023	13 November 2027		N. V. Ramana
Sandipkumar Chandrabhan More	Service	21 October 2021	4 August 2023	6 April 2028		N. V. Ramana
Urmila Sachin Joshi-Phalke	Service	6 June 2022	27 March 2024	14 April 2030		N. V. Ramana
Kishore Chandrakant Sant	Bar	19 July 2022	27 March 2024	6 October 2029		N. V. Ramana
Valmiki SA Menezes	Bar	19 July 2022	27 March 2024	28 July 2029		N. V. Ramana
Kamal Rashmi Khata	Bar	19 July 2022	27 March 2024	25 November 2031		N. V. Ramana
Sharmila Uttamrao Deshmukh	Bar	19 July 2022	27 March 2024	27 February 2030		N. V. Ramana
Arun Ramnath Pedneker	Bar	19 July 2022	27 March 2024	23 June 2033		N. V. Ramana
Sandeep Vishnupant Marne	Bar	19 July 2022	27 March 2024	8 December 2035		N. V. Ramana
Gauri Vinod Godse	Bar	19 July 2022	27 March 2024	7 October 2034		N. V. Ramana
Rajesh Shantaram Patil	Bar	19 July 2022	27 March 2024	20 July 2031		N. V. Ramana
Arif Saleh Doctor	Bar	19 July 2022	27 March 2024	16 July 2034		N. V. Ramana
Sanjay Anandrao Deshmukh	Service	7 October 2022	18 September 2025	11 May 2029		U. U. Lalit
Yanshivraj Gopichand Khobragade	Service	7 October 2022	22 July 2024	8 May 2028		U. U. Lalit
Mahendra Wadhumal Chandwani	Service	7 October 2022	22 July 2024	23 May 2033		U. U. Lalit
Abhay Sopanrao Waghwase	Service	7 October 2022	22 July 2024	9 December 2028		U. U. Lalit
Ravindra Madhusudan Joshi	Service	7 October 2022	22 July 2024	28 September 2029		U. U. Lalit
Vrushali Vijay Joshi	Service	7 October 2022	18 September 2025	5 December 2026		U. U. Lalit
Santosh Govindrao Chapalgaonkar	Bar	30 November 2022	22 July 2024	3 March 2035		U. U. Lalit
Milind Manohar Sathaye	Bar	30 November 2022	22 July 2024	5 September 2036		U. U. Lalit
Neela Kedar Gokhale	Bar	30 January 2023	22 July 2024	2 May 2031		D. Y. Chandrachud
Shailesh Pramod Brahme	Bar	15 June 2023	7 March 2025	13 February 2033		D. Y. Chandrachud
Firdosh Phiroze Pooniwalla	Bar	15 June 2023	7 March 2025	3 March 2032		D. Y. Chandrachud
Jitendra Shantilal Jain	Bar	15 June 2023	7 March 2025	26 February 2032		D. Y. Chandrachud
Manjusha Ajay Deshpande	Bar	11 August 2023	4 May 2026	26 October 2030		D. Y. Chandrachud
Abhay Jainarayanji Mantri	Service	21 October 2023	18 September 2025	15 January 2031		D. Y. Chandrachud
Shyam Chhaganlal Chandak	Service	21 October 2023	18 September 2025	9 December 2032		D. Y. Chandrachud
Neeraj Pradeep Dhote	Service	21 October 2023	18 September 2025	27 July 2032		D. Y. Chandrachud
Somasekhar Sundaresan	Bar	28 November 2023	18 September 2025	22 December 2034		D. Y. Chandrachud
Nivedita Prakash Mehta	Bar	25 October 2024	9 June 2026	16 February 2032		D. Y. Chandrachud
Prafulla Surendrakumar Khubalkar	Bar	25 October 2024	9 June 2026	6 December 2036		D. Y. Chandrachud
Ashwin Damodar Bhobe	Bar	25 October 2024	9 June 2026	13 February 2037		D. Y. Chandrachud
Rohit Wasudeo Joshi	Bar	25 October 2024	9 June 2026	15 August 2037		D. Y. Chandrachud
Advait Mahendra Sethna	Bar	25 October 2024	9 June 2026	10 October 2038		D. Y. Chandrachud
Pravin Sheshrao Patil	Bar	27 January 2025	9 June 2026	27 February 2035		Sanjiv Khanna

Additional judges
Name of Addl. Judge	Source	Date of appointment	Date of expiry of present term	Nominated as Judge by
Sachin Shivajirao Deshmukh	Bar	9 June 2025	8 June 2027	D. Y. Chandrachud
Gautam Ashwin Ankhad	Bar	4 July 2025	3 July 2027	D. Y. Chandrachud
Mahendra Madhavrao Nerlikar	Bar	4 July 2025	3 July 2027	D. Y. Chandrachud
Ajit Bhagwanrao Kadethankar	Bar	19 August 2025	18 August 2027	B. R. Gavai
Sushil Manohar Ghodeswar	Bar	19 August 2025	18 August 2027	B. R. Gavai
Aarti Arun Sathe	Bar	19 August 2025	18 August 2027	B. R. Gavai
Siddheshwar Sundarrao Thombre	Bar	2 September 2025	1 September 2027	B. R. Gavai
Mehroz Ashraf Khan Pathan	Bar	2 September 2025	1 September 2027	B. R. Gavai
Ranjitsinha Raja Bhonsale	Bar	2 September 2025	1 September 2027	B. R. Gavai
Nandesh Shankarrao Deshpande	Bar	2 September 2025	1 September 2027	B. R. Gavai
Amit Satyavan Jamsandekar	Bar	2 September 2025	1 September 2027	B. R. Gavai
Ashish Sahadev Chavan	Bar	2 September 2025	1 September 2027	B. R. Gavai
Sandesh Dadasaheb Patil	Bar	2 September 2025	1 September 2027	B. R. Gavai
Vaishali Nimbajirao Patil-Jadhav	Bar	2 September 2025	1 September 2027	B. R. Gavai
Abasaheb Dharmaji Shinde	Bar	2 September 2025	1 September 2027	B. R. Gavai
Shreeram Vinayak Shirsat	Bar	2 September 2025	1 September 2027	B. R. Gavai
Hiten Shamrao Venegavkar	Bar	2 September 2025	1 September 2027	B. R. Gavai
Farhan Parvez Dubash	Bar	2 September 2025	1 September 2027	B. R. Gavai
Rajnish Ratnakar Vyas	Bar	2 September 2025	1 September 2027	B. R. Gavai
Raj Damodar Wakode	Bar	2 September 2025	1 September 2027	B. R. Gavai
Ajay Sharma	Bar	18 November 2026	17 November 2028	Surya Kant

Judges transferred from the Bombay High Court
Name of the Judge	Source	Date of Appointment as Addl. Judge	Date of Appointment as Pmt. Judge	Date of retirement	Remarks
Revati Prashant Mohite Dere	Bar	21 June 2013	2 March 2016	16 April 2027	CJ of Meghalaya
Mahesh Sharadchandra Sonak	Bar	21 June 2013	2 March 2016	27 November 2026	CJ of Jharkhand
Ravindra Vithalrao Ghuge	Bar	21 June 2013	2 March 2016	8 July 2028	CJ of Calcutta
Nitin Wasudeo Sambre	Bar	6 January 2014	2 March 2016	18 December 2029	Transferred to Delhi

Current Judges elevated to Supreme Court
Name of the Judge	Image	Date of Appointment as Judge	Date of elevation to Supreme Court	Date of retirement
Prasanna Bhalachandra Varale		18 July 2008	25 January 2024	22 June 2027
Atul Sharachchandra Chandurkar		21 June 2013	30 May 2025	6 April 2030

== Calcutta High Court ==
The Calcutta High Court sits at Kolkata, the capital of the state of West Bengal, and has additional benches sitting at Port Blair in the Andaman and Nicobar Islands, as well as at Jalpaiguri in West Bengal. It can have a total of 72 judges, of which 54 judges must be permanently appointed and 18 may be additionally appointed. Currently, it has 49 judges.

Permanent judges
Name of the Judge	Source	Date of Appointment as Addl. Judge	Date of Appointment as Pmt. Judge	Date of retirement	Remarks	Nominated as Judge by
Ravindra Vithalrao Ghuge (CJ)	Bar	21 June 2013	2 March 2016	8 July 2028	CJ w.e.f. 09.09.2026 (PHC: Bombay)	Altamas Kabir
Tapabrata Chakraborty	Bar	30 October 2013	14 March 2016	26 November 2028		P. Sathasivam
Arijit Banerjee	Bar	30 October 2013	14 March 2016	6 March 2029		P. Sathasivam
Debangsu Basak	Bar	30 October 2013	14 March 2016	18 June 2028		P. Sathasivam
Madhuresh Prasad	Bar	22 May 2017	8 April 2019	1 October 2030	Joined on 02.11.2023 (PHC: Patna)	J.S. Khehar
Rajasekhar Mantha	Bar	21 September 2017	16 September 2019	28 October 2029		Dipak Misra
Sabyasachi Bhattacharyya	Bar	21 September 2017	16 September 2019	29 August 2032		Dipak Misra
Rajarshi Bharadwaj	Bar	21 September 2017	16 September 2019	3 August 2029		Dipak Misra
Shampa Sarkar	Bar	12 March 2018	12 February 2020	17 February 2030		Dipak Misra
Ravi Krishan Kapur	Bar	12 March 2018	12 February 2020	4 October 2033		Dipak Misra
Arindam Mukherjee	Bar	12 March 2018	12 February 2020	29 September 2030		Dipak Misra
Amrita Sinha	Bar	2 May 2018	24 April 2020	24 December 2031		Dipak Misra
Jay Sen Gupta	Bar	2 May 2018	24 April 2020	29 October 2032		Dipak Misra
Suvra Ghosh	Service	19 November 2018	4 May 2020	22 April 2030		Ranjan Gogoi
Tirthankar Ghosh	Bar	12 February 2019	24 September 2020	28 September 2030		Ranjan Gogoi
Hiranmay Bhattacharyya	Bar	12 February 2019	24 September 2020	17 December 2030		Ranjan Gogoi
Saugata Bhattacharyya	Bar	12 February 2019	24 September 2020	26 July 2034		Ranjan Gogoi
Kausik Chanda	Bar	1 October 2019	8 September 2021	3 January 2036		Ranjan Gogoi
Aniruddha Roy	Bar	5 May 2020	17 January 2022	14 October 2031		Ranjan Gogoi
Sugato Majumdar	Service	27 August 2021	2 May 2022	24 December 2029		S. A. Bobde
Bivas Pattanayak	Service	27 August 2021	2 May 2022	22 November 2032		S. A. Bobde
Krishna Rao	Bar	18 November 2021	1 August 2023	2 March 2028		N. V. Ramana
Ajoy Kumar Mukherjee	Service	18 November 2021	1 August 2023	7 January 2027		N. V. Ramana
Dinesh Kumar Sharma	Service	--	28 February 2022	20 September 2027	Joined on 07.04.2025 (PHC: Delhi)	N. V. Ramana
Gaurang Kanth	Bar	--	18 May 2022	19 August 2037	Joined on 21.07.2023 (PHC: Delhi)	N. V. Ramana
Ananya Bandyopadhyay	Service	18 May 2022	6 February 2024	2 March 2032		S. A. Bobde
Rai Chattopadhyay	Service	18 May 2022	6 February 2024	1 November 2033		S. A. Bobde
Raja Basu Chowdhury	Bar	9 June 2022	6 February 2024	19 October 2032		Ranjan Gogoi
Biswaroop Chowdhury	Service	31 August 2022	29 August 2026	28 September 2027		N. V. Ramana
Partha Sarathi Sen	Service	31 August 2022	26 August 2025	2 July 2031		N. V. Ramana
Apurba Sinha Ray	Service	31 August 2022	26 August 2025	24 November 2026		N. V. Ramana

Additional judges
Name of Addl. Judge	Source	Date of appointment	Date of expiry of present term	Nominated as Judge by
Prasenjit Biswas	Service	31 August 2022	28 February 2027 (Fresh term given for six-month w.e.f. 31/08/2026)	N. V. Ramana
Uday Kumar	Service	31 August 2022	28 February 2027 (Fresh term given for six-month w.e.f. 31/08/2026)	N. V. Ramana
Ajay Kumar Gupta	Service	31 August 2022	28 February 2027 (Fresh term given for six-month w.e.f. 31/08/2026)	N. V. Ramana
Supratim Bhattacharya	Service	31 August 2022	28 February 2027 (Fresh term given for six-month w.e.f. 31/08/2026)	N. V. Ramana
Partha Sarathi Chatterjee	Service	31 August 2022	28 February 2027 (Fresh term given for six-month w.e.f. 31/08/2026)	N. V. Ramana
Md. Shabbar Rashidi	Service	31 August 2022	28 February 2027 (Fresh term given for six-month w.e.f. 31/08/2026)	N. V. Ramana
Chaitali Chatterjee (Das)	Service	14 February 2025	13 February 2027	D. Y. Chandrachud
Smita Das De	Bar	11 March 2025	10 March 2027	Sanjiv Khanna
Reetobroto Kumar Mitra	Bar	11 March 2025	10 March 2027	Sanjiv Khanna
Om Narayan Rai	Bar	11 March 2025	10 March 2027	Sanjiv Khanna
Aryak Dutt	Bar	8 August 2026	7 August 2028	Surya Kant
Atarup Banerjee	Bar	8 August 2026	7 August 2028	Surya Kant
Sandip Kumar De	Bar	8 August 2026	7 August 2028	Surya Kant
Partha Pratim Roy	Bar	8 August 2026	7 August 2028	Surya Kant
Sudip Deb	Bar	8 August 2026	7 August 2028	Surya Kant
Anuj Singh	Bar	8 August 2026	7 August 2028	Surya Kant
Arjun Ray Mukherjee	Bar	8 August 2026	7 August 2028	Surya Kant
Rishad Medora	Bar	8 August 2026	7 August 2028	Surya Kant

Judges transferred from the Calcutta High Court
Name of the Judge	Source	Date of Appointment as Addl. Judge	Date of Appointment as Pmt. Judge	Date of retirement	Remarks
Soumen Sen	Bar	--	13 April 2011	26 July 2027	CJ of Kerala
Arindam Sinha	Bar	30 October 2013	14 March 2016	21 September 2027	Transferred to Allahabad
Shekhar B. Saraf	Bar	21 September 2017	16 September 2019	20 October 2033	Transferred to Allahabad
Moushumi Bhattacharya	Bar	21 September 2017	16 September 2019	26 October 2029	Transferred to Telangana
Subhendu Samanta	Service	18 May 2022	28 April 2025	24 November 2033	Transferred to AP
Lapita Banerji	Bar	9 June 2022	1 February 2024	22 June 2035	Transferred to P&H

Current Judges elevated to Supreme Court
Name of the Judge	Image	Date of Appointment as Judge	Date of elevation to Supreme Court	Date of retirement
Dipankar Datta		22 June 2006	12 December 2022	8 February 2030
Joymalya Bagchi		27 June 2011	17 March 2025	2 October 2031

== Chhattisgarh High Court ==
The Chhattisgarh High Court sits at Bilaspur in the state of Chhattisgarh, and may have a maximum of 22 judges, of which 17 may be permanent and 5 may be additionally appointed. Currently, it has 13 judges.

Permanent judges
Name of the Judge	Source	Date of Appointment as Addl. Judge	Date of Appointment as Pmt. Judge	Date of retirement	Remarks	Nominated as Judge by
Krushna Ram Mohapatra (CJ)	Bar	17 April 2015	7 April 2017	17 April 2027	CJ w.e.f. 07.09.2026 (PHC: Orissa)	H. L. Dattu
Parth Prateem Sahu	Bar	18 June 2018	11 May 2020	18 April 2033		Dipak Misra
Narendra Kumar Vyas	Bar	22 March 2021	15 December 2022	4 October 2032		S. A. Bobde
Naresh Kumar Chandravanshi	Service	22 March 2021	15 December 2022	5 November 2027		S. A. Bobde
Sachin Singh Rajput	Bar	16 May 2022	20 April 2026	26 January 2034		N. V. Ramana
Rakesh Mohan Pandey	Bar	2 August 2022	10 May 2024	29 January 2032		N. V. Ramana
Sanjay Kumar Jaiswal	Service	1 May 2023	20 April 2026	18 June 2027		D. Y. Chandrachud
Ravindra Kumar Agrawal	Bar	20 October 2023	11 August 2025	30 July 2030		D. Y. Chandrachud
Bibhu Datta Guru	Bar	13 August 2024	20 April 2026	6 July 2036		D. Y. Chandrachud
Amitendra Kishore Prasad	Bar	13 August 2024	20 April 2026	13 May 2031		D. Y. Chandrachud
Santosh Sharma	Service	--	10 September 2026	1 July 2030		Surya Kant
Sushma Sawant	Service	--	10 September 2026	23 November 2031		Surya Kant
Sudhir Kumar	Service	--	10 September 2026	14 July 2033		Surya Kant

Additional judges
Name of Addl. Judge	Source	Date of appointment	Date of expiry of present term	Nominated as Judge by
--	--	--	--	--

Judges transferred from the Chhattisgarh High Court
Name of the Judge	Source	Date of Appointment as Addl. Judge	Date of Appointment as Pmt. Judge	Date of retirement	Remarks
Sanjay Kumar Agrawal	Bar	16 September 2013	8 March 2016	14 July 2027	CJ of Rajasthan
Puthichira Sam Koshy	Bar	16 September 2013	8 March 2016	29 April 2029	ACJ of Telangana

Current Judges elevated to Supreme Court
Name of the Judge	Image	Date of Appointment as Judge	Date of elevation to Supreme Court	Date of retirement
Prashant Kumar Mishra		10 December 2009	19 May 2023	28 August 2029

== Delhi High Court ==
The Delhi High Court sits at Delhi, the capital of India, and may have a maximum of 60 judges, of which 45 may be permanently appointed and 15 additionally appointed. Currently, it has 48 judges.

Permanent judges
Name of the Judge	Source	Date of Appointment as Judge	Date of Appointment as Pmt. Judge	Date of retirement	Remarks	Nominated as Judge by
Nitin Wasudeo Sambre (ACJ)	Bar	6 January 2014	2 March 2016	18 December 2029	ACJ w.e.f. 06.10.2026; Joined on 21.07.2025 (PHC: Bombay)	P. Sathasivam
Dinesh Mehta	Bar	16 November 2016	16 March 2018	27 January 2030	Joined on 28.10.2025 (PHC: Rajasthan)	T. S. Thakur
Vivek Chaudhary	Bar	20 February 2017	14 March 2018	12 May 2028	Joined on 21.07.2025 (PHC: Allahabad)	J.S. Khehar
Prathiba M. Singh	Bar	--	15 May 2017	19 July 2030		J.S. Khehar
Navin Chawla	Bar	--	15 May 2017	6 August 2031		J.S. Khehar
C. Hari Shankar	Bar	--	15 May 2017	3 May 2030		J.S. Khehar
Avneesh Jhingan	Bar	10 July 2017	3 December 2018	28 January 2031	Joined on 28.10.2025 (PHC: P&H)	J.S. Khehar
Subramonium Prasad	Bar	4 June 2018	17 March 2020	21 June 2029	Joined on 13.03.2020 (PHC: Madras)	Dipak Misra
Jyoti Singh	Bar	--	22 October 2018	30 September 2028		Dipak Misra
Prateek Jalan	Bar	--	22 October 2018	3 April 2032		Dipak Misra
Anup Jairam Bhambhani	Bar	--	22 October 2018	4 December 2027		Dipak Misra
Sanjeev Narula	Bar	--	22 October 2018	23 August 2032		Dipak Misra
Manoj Kumar Ohri	Bar	--	20 November 2018	11 November 2031		Dipak Misra
Jasmeet Singh	Bar	--	24 February 2021	25 February 2030		S. A. Bobde
Amit Bansal	Bar	--	24 February 2021	7 February 2031		S. A. Bobde
Purushaindra Kumar Kaurav	Bar	--	8 October 2021	3 October 2038	Joined on 02.06.2022 (PHC: MP)	N. V. Ramana
Neena Bansal Krishna	Service	--	28 February 2022	17 June 2027		N. V. Ramana
Swarana Kanta Sharma	Service	--	28 March 2022	4 August 2030		N. V. Ramana
Mini Pushkarna	Bar	--	18 May 2022	30 November 2033		S. A. Bobde
Vikas Mahajan	Bar	--	18 May 2022	7 August 2031		N. V. Ramana
Tushar Rao Gedela	Bar	--	18 May 2022	17 July 2029		N. V. Ramana
Manmeet Pritam Singh Arora	Bar	--	18 May 2022	13 February 2036		N. V. Ramana
Sachin Datta	Bar	--	18 May 2022	14 August 2035		N. V. Ramana
Amit Mahajan	Bar	--	18 May 2022	19 April 2036		N. V. Ramana
Saurabh Banerjee	Bar	--	18 May 2022	19 January 2038		N. V. Ramana
Anish Dayal	Bar	--	2 June 2022	14 March 2035		S. A. Bobde
Amit Sharma	Bar	2 June 2022	6 March 2023	6 July 2034		S. A. Bobde
Om Prakash Shukla	Bar	3 August 2022	21 March 2024	19 April 2039	Joined on 21.07.2025 (PHC: Allahabad)	N. V. Ramana
Girish Kathpalia	Service	1 May 2023	22 July 2024	31 December 2026		D. Y. Chandrachud
Manoj Jain	Service	1 May 2023	22 July 2024	27 December 2026		D. Y. Chandrachud
Ravinder Dudeja	Service	20 October 2023	24 December 2024	16 May 2028		D. Y. Chandrachud
Ajay Digpaul	Bar	--	8 January 2025	1 September 2030		D. Y. Chandrachud
Harish Vaidyanathan Shankar	Bar	--	8 January 2025	17 February 2036		D. Y. Chandrachud
Tejas Dhirenbhai Karia	Bar	--	14 February 2025	31 January 2040		D. Y. Chandrachud
Renu Bhatnagar	Service	--	21 February 2025	26 August 2029		Sanjiv Khanna
Rajneesh Kumar Gupta	Service	--	21 February 2025	20 May 2028		Sanjiv Khanna
Vinod Kumar	Service	--	24 July 2025	29 December 2027		B. R. Gavai
Shail Jain	Service	--	24 July 2025	6 October 2028		B. R. Gavai
Madhu Jain	Service	--	24 July 2025	17 November 2028		B. R. Gavai
Vimal Kumar Yadav	Service	--	12 August 2025	8 January 2027		B. R. Gavai
Nivedita Anil Sharma	Service	--	21 September 2026	13 April 2028		Surya Kant
Nisha Sahay Saxena	Service	--	21 September 2026	14 August 2030		Surya Kant

Additional judges
Name of Addl. Judge	Source	Date of appointment	Date of expire of the present term	Nominated as Judge by
Sanjay Sharma	Service	21 September 2026	20 September 2028	Surya Kant
Bharat Parashar	Service	21 September 2026	20 September 2028	Surya Kant
Aditi Choudhary	Service	21 September 2026	23 April 2028	Surya Kant
Dinesh Bhatt	Service	21 September 2026	20 September 2028	Surya Kant
Arun Bhardwaj	Service	21 September 2026	20 September 2028	Surya Kant
Gurvinder Pal Singh	Service	7 October 2026	25 June 2028	Surya Kant

Judges transferred from the Delhi High Court
Name of the Judge	Source	Date of Appointment as Addl. Judge	Date of Appointment as Pmt. Judge	Date of retirement	Remarks
Vibhu Bakhru	Bar	17 April 2013	18 March 2015	1 November 2028	CJ of Karnataka
Valluri Kameswar Rao	Bar	17 April 2013	18 March 2015	6 August 2027	CJ of Patna
Dinesh Kumar Sharma	Service	--	28 February 2022	20 September 2027	Transferred to Calcutta
Tara Vitasta Ganju	Bar	--	18 May 2022	11 August 2033	Transferred to Karnataka
Gaurang Kanth	Bar	--	18 May 2022	19 August 2037	Transferred to Calcutta

Current Judges elevated to Supreme Court
Name of the Judge	Image	Date of Appointment as Judge	Date of elevation to Supreme Court	Date of retirement
Manmohan		13 March 2008	5 December 2024	16 December 2027
Sanjeev Sachdeva		17 April 2013	2 June 2026	25 December 2029

== Gauhati High Court ==
The Gauhati High Court sits at Guwahati in the state of Assam, and has a maximum permitted strength of 30 judges, of which 22 may be permanently appointed, and 8 may be additionally appointed. Currently, it has 25 judges.

Permanent judges
Name of the Judge	Source	Date of Appointment as Addl. Judge	Date of Appointment As Pmt. Judge	Date of retirement	Remarks	Nominated as Judge by
Ashutosh Kumar (CJ)	Bar	15 May 2014	21 April 2016	30 September 2028	CJ w.e.f. 21.07.2025 (PHC: Patna)	Rajendra Mal Lodha
Michael Zothankhuma	Bar	7 January 2015	3 January 2017	22 October 2027		H. L. Dattu
Kalyan Rai Surana	Bar	15 November 2016	12 November 2018	12 December 2027		T. S. Thakur
Nelson Sailo	Bar	15 November 2016	12 November 2018	8 October 2030		T. S. Thakur
Sanjay Kumar Medhi	Bar	19 November 2018	10 November 2020	7 March 2033		Dipak Misra
Manish Choudhury	Bar	18 January 2019	10 November 2020	28 February 2034		Ranjan Gogoi
Soumitra Saikia	Bar	26 November 2019	13 October 2021	24 July 2031		Ranjan Gogoi
Parthivjyoti Saikia	Service	26 November 2019	13 October 2021	17 April 2027		Ranjan Gogoi
Robin Phukan	Service	21 June 2021	18 May 2023	28 February 2028		N. V. Ramana
Devashis Baruah	Bar	13 October 2021	1 August 2023	21 February 2035		N. V. Ramana
Arun Dev Choudhury	Bar	5 November 2021	1 August 2023	28 October 2033		N. V. Ramana
Mitali Thakuria	Service	16 August 2022	18 June 2024	31 December 2026		N. V. Ramana
Kardak Ete	Bar	13 March 2023	21 January 2025	7 April 2037		D. Y. Chandrachud
Mridul Kumar Kalita	Service	20 April 2023	21 January 2025	1 July 2030		D. Y. Chandrachud
Budi Habung	Service	12 September 2023	1 September 2025	5 April 2031		D. Y. Chandrachud
N. Unni Krishnan Nair	Bar	10 November 2023	1 September 2025	27 July 2033		D. Y. Chandrachud
Kaushik Goswami	Bar	10 November 2023	5 October 2026	3 September 2037		D. Y. Chandrachud

Additional judges
Name of Addl. Judge	Source	Date of Appointment	Date of expiry of present term	Nominated as Judge by
Yarenjungla Longkumer	Service	17 February 2025	16 February 2027	D. Y. Chandrachud
Shamima Jahan	Bar	28 May 2025	27 May 2027	D. Y. Chandrachud
Anjan Moni Kalita	Bar	30 July 2025	29 July 2027	B. R. Gavai
Rajesh Majumdar	Bar	30 July 2025	29 July 2027	B. R. Gavai
Pranjal Das	Service	30 July 2025	29 July 2027	B. R. Gavai
Sanjeev Kumar Sharma	Service	30 July 2025	29 July 2027	B. R. Gavai
Nchumbemo Mozhui	Bar	10 September 2026	9 September 2028	Surya Kant
Helen Dawngliani	Service	10 September 2026	9 September 2028	Surya Kant

Judges transferred from the Guahati High Court
Name of the Judge	Source	Date of Appointment as Addl. Judge	Date of Appointment As Pmt. Judge	Date of retirement	Remarks
Manash Ranjan Pathak	Bar	22 May 2013	12 November 2018	27 August 2027	Transferred to Gujarat
Suman Shyam	Bar	7 January 2015	3 January 2017	11 June 2031	Transferred to Bombay
Nani Tagia	Bar	19 February 2018	10 November 2020	15 May 2031	Transferred to Patna

Current Judges elevated to Supreme Court
Name of the Judge	Image	Date of Appointment as Judge	Date of elevation to Supreme Court	Date of retirement
Ujjal Bhuyan		17 October 2011	14 July 2023	1 August 2029

== Gujarat High Court ==
The Gujarat High Court sits at Ahmedabad, in the state of Gujarat and is permitted to have a maximum strength of 52 judges of which 39 may be permanently appointed and 13 additionally appointed. Currently, it has 33 judges.

Permanent judges
Name of the Judge	Source	Date of Appointment as Addl. Judge	Date of Appointment As Pmt. Judge	Date of retirement	Remarks	Nominated as Judge by
Manash Ranjan Pathak (ACJ)	Bar	22 May 2013	12 November 2018	27 August 2027	ACJ w.e.f. 06.10.2026; Joined on 14.09.2026 (PHC: Gauhati)	Altamas Kabir
Arvindsingh Ishwarsingh Supehia	Bar	6 April 2016	15 March 2018	30 August 2031		T. S. Thakur
Bhargav Dhirenbhai Karia	Bar	--	5 March 2019	22 December 2027		Ranjan Gogoi
Sangeeta Kamalsingh Vishen	Bar	--	5 March 2019	29 December 2031		Ranjan Gogoi
Neranahalli Srinivasan Sanjay Gowda	Bar	11 November 2019	8 September 2021	14 February 2029	Joined on 09.06.2025 (PHC: Karnataka)	Ranjan Gogoi
Ilesh Jashvantrai Vora	Service	--	3 March 2020	17 August 2027		S. A. Bobde
Gita Gopi	Service	--	3 March 2020	23 March 2028		S. A. Bobde
Vaibhavi Devang Nanavati	Bar	--	4 October 2020	14 November 2032		S. A. Bobde
Nirzarkumar Sushilkumar Desai	Bar	--	4 October 2020	14 June 2035		S. A. Bobde
Nikhil Shreedharan Kariel	Bar	--	4 October 2020	9 May 2036		S. A. Bobde
Samir Jyotindraprasad Dave	Bar	--	18 October 2021	27 July 2029		N. V. Ramana
Hemant Maheshchandra Prachchhak	Bar	--	18 October 2021	3 June 2027		N. V. Ramana
Aniruddha Pradyumna Mayee	Bar	--	18 October 2021	1 July 2032		N. V. Ramana
Niral Rashmikant Mehta	Bar	--	18 October 2021	27 October 2038		N. V. Ramana
Nisha Mahendrabhai Thakore	Bar	--	18 October 2021	2 December 2037		N. V. Ramana
Susan Valentine Pinto	Service	--	17 March 2023	13 May 2029		D. Y. Chandrachud
Hasmukhbhai Dalsukhbhai Suthar	Service	--	17 March 2023	22 January 2032		D. Y. Chandrachud
Jitendra Champaklal Doshi	Service	--	17 March 2023	29 June 2031		D. Y. Chandrachud
Mangesh Rameshchandra Mengdey	Service	--	17 March 2023	4 October 2034		D. Y. Chandrachud
Divyeshkumar Amrutlal Joshi	Service	--	17 March 2023	24 November 2036		D. Y. Chandrachud
Devan Mahendrabhai Desai	Bar	--	5 April 2023	30 May 2032		D. Y. Chandrachud
Moxa Kiran Thakker	Bar	--	5 April 2023	5 November 2039		D. Y. Chandrachud
Vimal Kanaiyalal Vyas	Service	--	20 October 2023	24 December 2028		D. Y. Chandrachud
Pranav Shailesh Trivedi	Bar	--	24 January 2024	1 November 2037		D. Y. Chandrachud
Sanjeev Jayendra Thaker	Bar	--	10 October 2024	26 August 2031		D. Y. Chandrachud
Deeptendra Narayan Ray	Bar	--	10 October 2024	12 November 2033		D. Y. Chandrachud
Maulik Jitendra Shelat	Bar	--	10 October 2024	3 June 2038		D. Y. Chandrachud
Liyakathussain Shamsuddin Pirzada	Service	--	5 May 2025	24 April 2030		Sanjiv Khanna
Ramchandra Thakurdas Vachhani	Service	--	5 May 2025	11 March 2035		Sanjiv Khanna
Jayesh Lakhanshibhai Odedra	Service	--	5 May 2025	24 April 2035		Sanjiv Khanna
Pranav Maheshbhai Raval	Service	--	5 May 2025	23 October 2031		Sanjiv Khanna
Mool Chand Tyagi	Service	--	5 May 2025	14 October 2032		Sanjiv Khanna
Utkarsh Thakorbhai Desai	Service	--	5 May 2025	26 January 2031		Sanjiv Khanna

Additional judges
Name of Addl. Judge	Source	Date of appointment	Date of expire of the present term	Nominated as Judge by
--	--	--	--	--

Judges transferred from the Gujarat High Court
Name of the Judge	Source	Date of Appointment as Addl. Judge	Date of Appointment As Pmt. Judge	Date of retirement	Remarks
Alpesh Yeshwant Kogje	Bar	6 April 2016	15 March 2018	15 July 2031	CJ of MP
Sandeep Natvarlal Bhatt	Bar	--	18 October 2021	15 September 2029	Transferred to MP

Current Judges elevated to Supreme Court
Name of the Judge	Image	Date of Appointment as Judge	Date of elevation to Supreme Court	Date of retirement
Jamshed Burjor Pardiwala		17 February 2011	9 May 2022	11 August 2030
Nilay Vipinchandra Anjaria		21 November 2011	30 May 2025	22 March 2030
Vipul Manubhai Pancholi		1 October 2014	29 August 2025	27 May 2033

== Himachal Pradesh High Court ==
The Himachal Pradesh High Court sits at Shimla in Himachal Pradesh, and is permitted to have a maximum of 17 judges of which 13 may be permanently appointed and 4 may be additionally appointed. Currently, it has 15 judges.

Permanent judges
Name of the Judge	Source	Date of Appointment as Addl. Judge	Date of Appointment As Pmt. Judge	Date of retirement	Remarks	Nominated as Judge by
Gurmeet Singh Sandhawalia (CJ)	Bar	30 September 2011	24 January 2014	31 October 2027	CJ w.e.f. 29.12.2024 (PHC: P&H)	S. H. Kapadia
Vivek Singh Thakur	Bar	--	12 April 2016	16 April 2028		T. S. Thakur
Ajay Mohan Goel	Bar	--	12 April 2016	10 January 2031		T. S. Thakur
Sandeep Sharma	Bar	12 April 2016	8 January 2018	19 July 2030		T. S. Thakur
Jyotsna Rewal Dua	Bar	30 May 2019	28 July 2020	24 May 2031		Ranjan Gogoi
Sushil Kukreja	Service	--	16 August 2022	13 April 2029		N. V. Ramana
Virender Singh	Service	--	16 August 2022	13 November 2028		N. V. Ramana
Ranjan Sharma	Bar	--	31 July 2023	20 August 2030		D. Y. Chandrachud
Bipin Chander Negi	Bar	--	31 July 2023	19 July 2030		D. Y. Chandrachud
Rakesh Kainthla	Service	--	31 July 2023	22 May 2030		D. Y. Chandrachud
Jiya Lal Bhardwaj	Bar	--	6 October 2025	19 August 2031		B. R. Gavai
Romesh Verma	Bar	--	6 October 2025	6 May 2036		B. R. Gavai
Chirag Bhanu Singh	Service	--	30 August 2026	17 December 2032		Surya Kant

Additional Judges
Name of Addl. Judge	Source	Date of appointment	Date of expire of the present term	Nominated as Judge by
Bhupesh Sharma	Service	30 August 2026	29 August 2028	Surya Kant
Yogesh Jaswal	Service	30 August 2026	29 August 2028	Surya Kant

Judges transferred from the Himachal Pradesh High Court
Name of the Judge	Source	Date of Appointment as Addl. Judge	Date of Appointment As Pmt. Judge	Date of retirement	Remarks
Anoop Chitkara	Bar	--	30 May 2019	28 April 2028	Transfer to P&H

Current Judges elevated to Supreme Court
Name of the Judge	Image	Date of Appointment as Judge	Date of elevation to Supreme Court	Date of retirement
--	--	--	--	--

== Jammu & Kashmir and Ladakh High Court ==
The Jammu & Kashmir and Ladakh High Court sits at Srinagar in the summer, and in Jammu in the winter, and has jurisdiction over Jammu and Kashmir and Ladakh. It is permitted to have a maximum of 25 judges, of which 19 may be permanent and 6 may be additionally appointed. Currently, it has 14 judges.

Permanent judges
Name of the Judge	Source	Date of Appointment as Addl. Judge	Date of Appointment As Pmt. Judge	Date of retirement	Remarks	Nominated as Judge by
Pushpendra Singh Bhati (CJ)	Bar	16 November 2016	16 March 2018	20 September 2032	CJ w.e.f. 09.09.2026 (PHC: Rajasthan)	T. S. Thakur
Sanjeev Kumar	Bar	--	6 June 2017	7 April 2028		J.S. Khehar
Sindhu Sharma	Bar	--	7 August 2018	9 October 2034		Dipak Misra
Rajnesh Oswal	Bar	--	2 April 2020	16 June 2035		Ranjan Gogoi
Sanjay Dhar	Service	--	7 April 2020	10 May 2027		S. A. Bobde
Mohd. Akram Chowdhary	Service	--	9 November 2021	9 June 2027		N. V. Ramana
Rahul Bharti	Bar	28 March 2022	29 January 2024	30 July 2029		S. A. Bobde
Moksha Khajuria Kazmi	Bar	28 March 2022	29 January 2024	31 December 2034		Ranjan Gogoi
Wasim Sadiq Nargal	Bar	3 June 2022	17 March 2025	30 July 2030		S. A. Bobde
Rajesh Sekhri	Service	29 July 2022	17 March 2025	25 September 2027		N. V. Ramana
Mohd. Yousuf Wani	Service	25 March 2024	17 March 2025	23 April 2028		D. Y. Chandrachud
Sanjay Parihar	Service	--	1 May 2025	18 December 2030		Sanjiv Khanna
Shahzad Azeem	Service	--	1 May 2025	26 April 2037		Sanjiv Khanna
Yash Paul Bourney	Service	--	22 September 2026	24 August 2029		Surya Kant

Additional judges
Name of Addl. Judge	Source	Date of appointment	Date of expiry of present term	Nominated as Judge by
--	--	--	--	--

Judges transferred from the Jammu and Kashmir and Ladakh High Court
Name of the Judge	Source	Date of Appointment as Addl. Judge	Date of Appointment As Pmt. Judge	Date of retirement	Remarks
--	--	--	--	--	--

Current Judges elevated to Supreme Court
Name of the Judge	Image	Date of Appointment as Judge	Date of elevation to Supreme Court	Date of retirement
--	--	--	--	--

== Jharkhand High Court ==
The Jharkhand High Court sits at Ranchi and has jurisdiction over the state of Jharkhand. It is permitted to have a maximum of 25 judges of which 20 may be permanently appointed and 5 may be additionally appointed. Currently, it has 16 judges.

Permanent judges
Name of the Judge	Source	Date of Appointment as Addl. Judge	Date of Appointment as Pmt. Judge	Date of retirement	Remarks	Nominated as Judge by
Mahesh Sharadchandra Sonak (CJ)	Bar	21 June 2013	2 March 2016	27 November 2026	CJ w.e.f. 09.01.2026 (PHC: Bombay)	Altamas Kabir
Sujit Narayan Prasad	Bar	26 September 2014	15 July 2016	19 June 2029		Rajendra Mal Lodha
Rongon Mukhopadhyay	Bar	26 September 2014	24 September 2016	28 December 2029		Rajendra Mal Lodha
Ananda Sen	Bar	8 April 2016	9 January 2018	14 August 2031		T. S. Thakur
Rajesh Shankar	Bar	30 September 2016	19 September 2018	15 December 2032		T. S. Thakur
Anil Kumar Choudhary	Service	20 May 2017	26 April 2019	17 June 2027		J.S. Khehar
Rajesh Kumar	Bar	6 January 2018	19 December 2019	25 October 2030		Dipak Misra
Anubha Rawat Choudhary	Bar	6 January 2018	19 December 2019	24 June 2032		Dipak Misra
Sanjay Kumar Dwivedi	Bar	18 February 2019	15 September 2020	2 November 2027		Ranjan Gogoi
Deepak Roshan	Bar	18 February 2019	15 September 2020	11 December 2029		Ranjan Gogoi
Sanjay Prasad	Service	--	8 October 2021	16 January 2027		N. V. Ramana
Pradeep Kumar Srivastava	Service	7 June 2022	2 February 2024	31 December 2027		N. V. Ramana
Arun Kumar Rai	Service	--	5 February 2024	25 January 2032		D. Y. Chandrachud
Manoj Prasad	Service	--	23 September 2026	15 November 2035		Surya Kant
Akhil Kumar	Service	--	23 September 2026	5 January 2034		Surya Kant
Ram Sharma	Service	--	23 September 2026	6 July 2030		Surya Kant

Additional Judges
Name of Addl. Judge	Source	Date of initial appointment	Date of expiry of the present term	Nominated as Judge by
--	--	--	--	--

Judges transferred from the Jharkhand High Court
Name of the Judge	Source	Date of Appointment as Addl. Judge	Date of Appointment As Pmt. Judge	Date of retirement	Remarks
--	--	--	--	--	--

Current Judges elevated to Supreme Court
Name of the Judge	Image	Date of Appointment as Judge	Date of elevation to Supreme Court	Date of retirement
Shree Chandrashekhar		17 January 2013	2 June 2026	24 May 2030
Aparesh Kumar Singh		24 January 2012	6 October 2026	6 July 2030

== Karnataka High Court ==
The Karnataka High Court sits at Bangalore and has jurisdiction over the state of Karnataka. It is permitted to have a maximum of 62 judges of which 47 may be permanently appointed and 15 may be additionally appointed. Currently, it has 57 judges.

Permanent judges
Name of the Judge	Source	Date of Appointment as Addl. Judge	Date of Appointment as Pmt. Judge	Date of retirement	Remarks	Nominated as Judge by
Vibhu Bakhru (CJ)	Bar	17 April 2013	18 March 2015	1 November 2028	CJ w.e.f. 19.07.2025 (PHC: Delhi)	Altamas Kabir
Anu Sivaraman	Bar	10 April 2015	5 April 2017	24 May 2028	Joined on 21.03.2024 (PHC: Kerala)	H. L. Dattu
Jayant Banerji	Bar	22 September 2017	6 September 2019	16 January 2027	Joined on 19.07.2025 (PHC: Allahabad)	Dipak Misra
Dinesh Kumar Singh	Bar	22 September 2017	6 September 2019	17 August 2028	Joined on 19.07.2025 (PHC: Allahabad)	Dipak Misra
Shankar Ganapathi Pandit	Bar	14 February 2018	7 January 2020	15 November 2027		Dipak Misra
Ramakrishna Devdas	Bar	14 February 2018	7 January 2020	14 May 2031		Dipak Misra
Bhotanhosur Mallikarjuna Shyam Prasad	Bar	14 February 2018	7 January 2020	7 January 2033		Dipak Misra
Siddappa Sunil Dutt Yadav	Bar	14 February 2018	7 January 2020	2 August 2034		Dipak Misra
Mohammad Nawaz	Bar	2 June 2018	26 February 2020	21 May 2027		Dipak Misra
Harekoppa Thimmanna Gowda Narendra Prasad	Bar	2 June 2018	26 February 2020	31 May 2028		Dipak Misra
Hethur Puttaswamygowda Sandesh	Service	3 November 2018	26 February 2020	1 December 2026		Dipak Misra
Singapuram Raghavachar Krishna Kumar	Bar	23 September 2019	1 March 2021	6 May 2032		Ranjan Gogoi
Ashok Subhashchandra Kinagi	Bar	23 September 2019	1 March 2021	31 December 2031		Ranjan Gogoi
Suraj Govindaraj	Bar	23 September 2019	1 March 2021	13 May 2035		Ranjan Gogoi
Sachin Shankar Magadum	Bar	23 September 2019	1 March 2021	4 May 2034		Ranjan Gogoi
Jyoti Mulimani	Bar	11 November 2019	8 September 2021	14 August 2030		Ranjan Gogoi
Nataraj Rangaswamy	Bar	11 November 2019	8 September 2021	13 March 2032		Ranjan Gogoi
Pradeep Singh Yerur	Bar	11 November 2019	8 September 2021	20 June 2032		Ranjan Gogoi
Maheshan Nagaprasanna	Bar	26 November 2019	8 September 2021	22 March 2033		Ranjan Gogoi
Maralur Indrakumar Arun	Bar	7 January 2020	23 September 2021	23 April 2032		Ranjan Gogoi
Engalaguppe Seetharamaiah Indiresh	Bar	7 January 2020	23 September 2021	15 April 2034		Ranjan Gogoi
Ravi Venkappa Hosmani	Bar	7 January 2020	23 September 2021	28 July 2033		Ranjan Gogoi
Savanur Vishwajith Shetty	Bar	28 April 2020	23 September 2021	18 May 2029		Ranjan Gogoi
Lalitha Kanneganti	Bar	--	2 May 2020	4 May 2033	Joined on 28.07.2023 (PHC: AP)	S. A. Bobde
Shivashankar Amarannavar	Service	4 May 2020	23 September 2021	19 July 2032		S. A. Bobde
Vedavyasachar Srishananda	Service	4 May 2020	23 September 2021	28 March 2028		S. A. Bobde
Hanchate Sanjeev Kumar	Service	4 May 2020	23 September 2021	12 May 2033		S. A. Bobde
Mohammed Ghouse Shukure Kamal	Bar	17 March 2021	30 September 2022	29 June 2033		Ranjan Gogoi
Perugu Sree Sudha	Service	--	15 October 2021	5 June 2029	Joined on 11.06.2025 (PHC: Telangana)	N. V. Ramana
Chillakur Sumalatha	Service	--	15 October 2021	4 February 2034	Joined on 23.11.2023 (PHC: Telangana)	N. V. Ramana
Anant Ramanath Hegde	Bar	8 November 2021	21 September 2023	6 March 2033		N. V. Ramana
Siddaiah Rachaiah	Bar	8 November 2021	5 November 2024	31 May 2029		N. V. Ramana
Kannakuzhyil Sreedharan Hemalekha	Bar	8 November 2021	21 September 2023	27 March 2037		N. V. Ramana
Kumbhajadala Manmadha Rao	Bar	--	8 December 2021	12 June 2028	Joined on 02.06.2025 (PHC: AP)	N. V. Ramana
Tara Vitasta Ganju	Bar	--	18 May 2022	11 August 2033	Joined on 28.10.2025 (PHC: Delhi)	S. A. Bobde
Cheppudira Monappa Poonacha	Bar	13 June 2022	16 April 2024	5 April 2033		N. V. Ramana
Gurusiddaiah Basavaraja	Service	16 August 2022	12 August 2025	2 May 2027		N. V. Ramana
Venkatesh Naik Thavaryanaik	Service	24 January 2023	8 January 2025	31 May 2037		D. Y. Chandrachud
Vijaykumar Adagouda Patil	Bar	9 February 2023	8 January 2025	13 October 2037		D. Y. Chandrachud
Rajesh Rai Kallangala	Bar	9 February 2023	5 February 2025	31 May 2036		D. Y. Chandrachud
Kurubarahalli Venkataramareddy Aravind	Bar	25 October 2023	30 September 2025	11 July 2039		D. Y. Chandrachud

Additional Judges
Name of Addl. Judge	Source	Date of appointment	Date of expiry of present term	Nominated as Judge by
Taj Ali Moulasab Nadaf	Bar	17 February 2025	16 February 2027	D. Y. Chandrachud
Geetha Kadaba Bharatharaja Setty	Service	30 September 2025	29 September 2027	B. R. Gavai
Borkatte Muralidhara Pai	Service	30 September 2025	29 September 2027	B. R. Gavai
Tyagaraja Narayan Inavally	Service	30 September 2025	29 September 2027	B. R. Gavai
Rajeshwari Narayana Hegde	Service	1 June 2026	17 March 2028	Surya Kant
Kedambadi Ganesh Shanthi	Service	1 June 2026	31 May 2028	Surya Kant
Brungesh Mahadevappa	Service	1 June 2026	31 May 2028	Surya Kant
Raghavendra Seetharam Srivatsa	Bar	9 August 2026	8 August 2028	Surya Kant
Hema Kulkarni	Bar	9 August 2026	8 August 2028	Surya Kant
Subramanya Rangarao	Bar	9 August 2026	8 August 2028	Surya Kant
Thadagavadi Prakash Vivekananda	Bar	9 August 2026	8 August 2028	Surya Kant
Bakkeswara Pramod	Bar	9 August 2026	8 August 2028	Surya Kant
Hombe Gowda Shanthi Bhushan	Bar	9 August 2026	8 August 2028	Surya Kant
Usharani	Service	25 September 2026	24 September 2028	Surya Kant
Kuruba Shanthappa Bharath Kumar	Service	25 September 2026	24 September 2028	Surya Kant
Nerale Veerabhadraiah Bhavani	Service	25 September 2026	24 September 2028	Surya Kant

Judges transferred from the Karnataka High Court
Name of the Judge	Source	Date of Appointment as Addl. Judge	Date of Appointment As Pmt. Judge	Date of retirement	Remarks
Neranahalli Srinivasan Sanjay Gowda	Bar	11 November 2019	8 September 2021	14 February 2029	Transferred to Gujarat
Hemant Chandangoudar	Bar	11 November 2019	8 September 2021	27 September 2031	Transferred to Madras

Current Judges elevated to Supreme Court
Name of the Judge	Image	Date of Appointment as Judge	Date of elevation to Supreme Court	Date of retirement
Bengaluru Venkataramaiah Nagarathna		18 February 2008	31 August 2021	29 October 2027
Aravind Kumar		26 June 2009	13 February 2023	13 July 2027

== Kerala High Court ==
The Kerala High Court sits at Kochi and has jurisdiction over the state of Kerala. It is permitted to have a maximum of 47 judges of which 35 may be permanently appointed and 12 may be additionally appointed. Currently, it has 35 judges.

Permanent judges
Name of the Judge	Source	Date of Appointment as Addl. Judge	Date of Appointment as Pmt. Judge	Date of retirement	Remarks	Nominated as Judge by
Soumen Sen (CJ)	Bar	--	13 April 2011	26 July 2027	CJ w.e.f. 10.01.2026 (PHC: Calcutta)	S. H. Kapadia
Ala Kunnil Jayasankaran Nambiar	Bar	23 January 2014	10 March 2016	26 January 2028		P. Sathasivam
Anil Kolavampara Narendran	Bar	23 January 2014	10 March 2016	4 May 2029		P. Sathasivam
Raja Vijayaraghavan Valsala	Bar	10 April 2015	5 April 2017	27 May 2029		H. L. Dattu
J. Nisha Banu	Bar	--	5 October 2016	17 September 2028	Joined on 19.12.2025 (PHC: Madras)	T. S. Thakur
Sathish Ninan	Bar	5 October 2016	16 March 2018	31 March 2030		T. S. Thakur
Devan Ramachandran	Bar	5 October 2016	16 March 2018	18 March 2030		T. S. Thakur
Conrad Stansilaus Dias	Bar	18 November 2019	28 May 2021	18 November 2031		Ranjan Gogoi
Pulleri Vadhyarillath Kunhikrishnan	Bar	13 February 2020	28 May 2021	21 May 2029		Ranjan Gogoi
Thirumuppath Raghavan Ravi	Bar	6 March 2020	28 May 2021	1 March 2027		S. A. Bobde
Bechu Kurian Thomas	Bar	6 March 2020	28 May 2021	4 December 2030		S. A. Bobde
Gopinath Puzhankara	Bar	6 March 2020	28 May 2021	12 November 2034		S. A. Bobde
Murali Purushothaman	Bar	25 February 2021	6 June 2022	30 July 2029		S. A. Bobde
Gopinath Puzhankara	Bar	25 February 2021	6 June 2022	11 May 2034		S. A. Bobde
Kauser Edappagath	Service	25 February 2021	6 June 2022	24 May 2030		S. A. Bobde
Abdul Rahim Musaliar Badharudeen	Service	25 June 2021	25 January 2023	28 May 2030		S. A. Bobde
Viju Abraham	Bar	13 August 2021	25 January 2023	10 September 2034		Ranjan Gogoi
Mohammed Nias Chovvakkaran Puthiyapurayil	Bar	13 August 2021	25 January 2023	15 April 2032		Ranjan Gogoi
Basant Balaji	Bar	8 October 2021	21 July 2023	27 May 2034		N. V. Ramana
Chandrasekharan Kartha Jayachandran	Service	20 October 2021	21 July 2023	27 May 2034		N. V. Ramana
Shoba Annamma Eapen	Bar	18 May 2022	1 February 2024	18 January 2029		N. V. Ramana
Johnson John	Service	25 October 2023	9 September 2025	28 April 2027		D. Y. Chandrachud
Gopinathan Unnithan Girish	Service	25 October 2023	9 September 2025	16 May 2029		D. Y. Chandrachud
Mullappally Abdul Aziz Abdul Hakhim	Bar	22 March 2024	4 March 2026	7 May 2031		D. Y. Chandrachud
Syam Kumar Vadakke Mudavakkat	Bar	22 March 2024	4 March 2026	31 December 2034		D. Y. Chandrachud
Harisankar Vijayan Menon	Bar	22 March 2024	4 March 2026	3 April 2036		D. Y. Chandrachud
Manu Sreedharan Nair	Bar	22 March 2024	4 March 2026	26 May 2036		D. Y. Chandrachud
Easwaran Subramani	Bar	22 March 2024	4 March 2026	29 September 2036		D. Y. Chandrachud
Manoj Pulamby Madhavan	Bar	22 March 2024	4 March 2026	3 May 2034		D. Y. Chandrachud
Parameswara Panicker Krishna Kumar	Service	30 October 2024	5 October 2026	24 May 2037		D. Y. Chandrachud
Kodassery Veliyath Madom Jayakumar	Service	30 October 2024	5 October 2026	20 May 2035		D. Y. Chandrachud
Muralee Krishna Shankaramoole	Service	30 October 2024	5 October 2026	23 May 2038		D. Y. Chandrachud
Jobin Sebastian	Service	30 October 2024	5 October 2026	26 April 2037		D. Y. Chandrachud
Pandikkaran Varadaraja Iyer Balakrishnan	Service	30 October 2024	5 October 2026	22 March 2037		D. Y. Chandrachud

Additional judges
Name of Addl. Judge	Source	Date of appointment	Date of expiry of present term	Nominated as Judge by
Preeta Arvindan Krishnamma	Bar	27 April 2026	26 April 2028	Surya Kant

Judges transferred from the Kerala High Court
Name of the Judge	Source	Date of Appointment as Addl. Judge	Date of Appointment As Pmt. Judge	Date of retirement	Remarks
Muhamed Mustaque Ayumantakath	Bar	23 January 2014	10 March 2016	31 May 2029	CJ of Sikkim
Anu Sivaraman	Bar	10 April 2015	5 April 2017	24 May 2028	Transferred to Karnataka

Current Judges elevated to Supreme Court
Name of the Judge	Image	Date of Appointment as Judge	Date of elevation to Supreme Court	Date of retirement
Krishnan Vinod Chandran		8 November 2011	16 January 2025	24 April 2028

== Madhya Pradesh High Court ==
The Madhya Pradesh High Court sits at Jabalpur and has jurisdiction over the state of Madhya Pradesh. It is permitted to have a maximum of 53 judges, of which 40 may be permanently appointed and 13 may be additionally appointed. Currently, it has 37 judges.

Permanent judges
Name of the Judge	Source	Date of Appointment as Addl. Judge	Date of Appointment as Pmt. Judge	Date of retirement	Remarks	Nominated as Judge by
Alpesh Yeshwant Kogje (CJ)	Bar	6 April 2016	15 March 2018	15 July 2031	CJ w.e.f. 10.09.2026 (PHC: Gujarat)	T. S. Thakur
Vivek Rusia	Bar	7 April 2016	17 March 2018	1 August 2031		T. S. Thakur
Anand Pathak	Bar	7 April 2016	17 March 2018	17 July 2030		T. S. Thakur
Vivek Agarwal	Bar	7 April 2016	17 March 2018	27 June 2029		T. S. Thakur
Gurpal Singh Ahluwalia	Bar	13 October 2016	17 March 2018	19 February 2028		T. S. Thakur
Subodh Abhyankar	Bar	13 October 2016	17 March 2018	2 January 2031		T. S. Thakur
Vivek Kumar Singh	Bar	22 September 2017	6 September 2019	24 March 2030	Joined on 24.07.2025 (PHC: Allahabad)	Dipak Misra
Vishal Dhagat	Bar	--	27 May 2019	13 December 2031		Ranjan Gogoi
Vishal Mishra	Bar	--	27 May 2019	16 July 2036		Ranjan Gogoi
Pranay Verma	Bar	--	27 August 2021	11 December 2035		S. A. Bobde
Sandeep Natvarlal Bhatt	Bar	--	18 October 2021	15 September 2029	Joined on 04.11.2025 (PHC: Gujarat)	N. V. Ramana
Maninder Singh Bhatti	Bar	--	15 February 2022	2 November 2030		N. V. Ramana
Dwarka Dhish Bansal	Bar	--	15 February 2022	16 February 2030		N. V. Ramana
Milind Ramesh Phadke	Bar	--	15 February 2022	5 November 2033		N. V. Ramana
Anuradha Shukla	Service	--	1 May 2023	12 June 2029		D. Y. Chandrachud
Sanjeev Sudhakar Kalgaonkar	Service	--	1 May 2023	22 February 2032		D. Y. Chandrachud
Vinay Saraf	Bar	--	6 November 2023	14 June 2031		D. Y. Chandrachud
Vivek Jain	Bar	--	6 November 2023	29 December 2037		D. Y. Chandrachud
Rajendra Kumar Vani	Service	--	6 November 2023	17 August 2027		D. Y. Chandrachud
Devnarayan Mishra	Service	--	6 November 2023	30 April 2029		D. Y. Chandrachud
Gajendra Singh	Service	--	6 November 2023	14 January 2028		D. Y. Chandrachud
Ashish Shroti	Bar	--	17 February 2025	15 November 2038		D. Y. Chandrachud
Deepak Khot	Bar	--	30 May 2025	7 March 2037		D. Y. Chandrachud
Amit Seth	Bar	--	30 May 2025	14 March 2037		D. Y. Chandrachud
Pavan Kumar Dwivedi	Bar	--	30 May 2025	23 July 2036		D. Y. Chandrachud
Pushpendra Yadav	Bar	--	30 July 2025	26 February 2039		B. R. Gavai
Anand Singh Bahrawat	Bar	--	30 July 2025	25 July 2040		B. R. Gavai
Ajay Kumar Nirankari	Bar	--	30 July 2025	4 October 2037		B. R. Gavai
Jay Kumar Pillai	Bar	--	30 July 2025	3 August 2033		B. R. Gavai
Himanshu Joshi	Bar	--	30 July 2025	3 April 2041		B. R. Gavai
Ramkumar Choubey	Service	--	30 July 2025	30 June 2028		D. Y. Chandrachud
Rajesh Kumar Gupta	Service	--	30 July 2025	14 August 2027		B. R. Gavai

Additional judges
Name of Addl. Judge	Source	Date of appointment	Date of expire of the present term	Nominated as Judge by
Alok Awasthi	Service	30 July 2025	29 July 2027	B. R. Gavai
Ratnesh Chandra Singh Bisen	Service	30 July 2025	29 July 2027	B. R. Gavai
Bhagwati Prasad Sharma	Service	30 July 2025	29 July 2027	B. R. Gavai
Pradeep Mittal	Service	11 August 2025	10 August 2027	B. R. Gavai
Amit Lahoti	Bar	10 August 2026	9 August 2028	Surya Kant

Judges transferred from the Madhya Pradesh High Court
Name of the Judge	Source	Date of Appointment as Addl. Judge	Date of Appointment As Pmt. Judge	Date of retirement	Remarks
Atul Sreedharan	Bar	7 April 2016	17 March 2018	24 May 2028	Transferred to Allahabad
Sushrut Arvind Dharmadhikari	Bar	7 April 2016	17 March 2018	7 July 2028	CJ of Madras
Purushaindra Kaurav	Bar	--	8 October 2021	3 October 2038	Transferred to Delhi

Current Judges elevated to Supreme Court
Name of the Judge	Image	Date of Appointment as Judge	Date of elevation to Supreme Court	Date of retirement
Satish Chandra Sharma		18 January 2008	9 November 2023	29 November 2026
Alok Aradhe		29 December 2009	29 August 2025	12 April 2029
Sheel Nagu		27 May 2011	2 June 2026	31 December 2029

== Madras High Court ==
The Madras High Court sits at Chennai and has jurisdiction over the state of Tamil Nadu. It is permitted to have a maximum of 75 judges, of which 56 may be permanently appointed and 19 may be additionally appointed. Currently, it has 67 judges.

Permanent judges
Name of the Judge	Source	Date of Appointment as Addl. Judge	Date of Appointment As Pmt. Judge	Date of retirement	Remarks	Nominated as Judge by
Sushrut Arvind Dharmadhikari (CJ)	Bar	7 April 2016	17 March 2018	7 July 2028	CJ w.e.f. 06.03.2026 (PHC: MP)	T. S. Thakur
S. M. Subramaniam	Bar	--	5 October 2016	30 May 2027		T. S. Thakur
Dr. Anita Sumanth	Bar	--	5 October 2016	14 April 2032		T. S. Thakur
P. Velmurugan	Service	--	5 October 2016	8 June 2027		T. S. Thakur
Dr. G. Jayachandran	Service	--	5 October 2016	31 March 2027		T. S. Thakur
C. V. Karthikeyan	Service	--	5 October 2016	13 December 2026		T. S. Thakur
N. Sathish Kumar	Service	16 November 2016	2 November 2018	5 May 2029		T. S. Thakur
A. D. Jagadish Chandira	Bar	28 June 2017	9 April 2019	14 February 2028		J.S. Khehar
G. R. Swaminathan	Bar	28 June 2017	9 April 2019	31 May 2030		J.S. Khehar
Abdul Quddhose	Bar	28 June 2017	9 April 2019	7 September 2031		J.S. Khehar
M. Dhandapani	Bar	28 June 2017	9 April 2019	14 April 2030		J.S. Khehar
Pondicherry Daivasigamani Audikesavalu	Bar	28 June 2017	9 April 2019	29 December 2032		J.S. Khehar
P. T. Asha	Bar	4 June 2018	17 March 2020	21 August 2028		Dipak Misra
N. Nirmal Kumar	Bar	4 June 2018	17 March 2020	22 November 2027		Dipak Misra
N. Anand Venkatesh	Bar	4 June 2018	17 March 2020	3 July 2031		Dipak Misra
G. K. Ilanthiraiyan	Bar	4 June 2018	17 March 2020	8 July 2032		Dipak Misra
Krishnan Ramasmy	Bar	4 June 2018	17 March 2020	2 June 2030		Dipak Misra
C. Saravanan	Bar	4 June 2018	17 March 2020	30 November 2033		Dipak Misra
B. Pugalendhi	Bar	20 November 2018	17 March 2020	24 May 2029		Dipak Misra
Senthilkumar Ramamoorthy	Bar	22 February 2019	17 March 2020	1 October 2028		Dipak Misra
Hemant Chandangoudar	Bar	11 November 2019	8 September 2021	27 September 2031	Joined on 02.06.2025 (PHC: Karnataka)	Ranjan Gogoi
Shamim Ahmed	Bar	12 December 2019	26 March 2021	7 March 2028	Joined on 30.09.2024 (PHC: Allahabad)	Dipak Misra
Murali Shankar Kuppuraju	Service	3 December 2020	31 May 2022	30 May 2030		S. A. Bobde
Thamilselvi T. Valayapalayam	Service	3 December 2020	31 May 2022	18 June 2030		S. A. Bobde
Sundaram Srimathy	Bar	20 October 2021	6 March 2023	9 January 2029		N. V. Ramana
D. Bharatha Chakravarthy	Bar	20 October 2021	6 March 2023	23 July 2033		N. V. Ramana
R. Vijayakumar	Bar	20 October 2021	6 March 2023	21 December 2032		N. V. Ramana
Mohammed Shaffiq	Bar	20 October 2021	6 March 2023	5 March 2034		N. V. Ramana
Mummineni Sudheer Kumar	Bar	--	24 March 2022	19 May 2031	Joined on 23.11.2023 (PHC: Telangana)	N. V. Ramana
Kasoju Surendhar	Bar	--	24 March 2022	10 January 2030	Joined on 16.06.2025 (PHC: Telangana)	N. V. Ramana
Nidumolu Mala	Bar	28 March 2022	14 September 2023	23 April 2029		N. V. Ramana
S. Sounthar	Bar	28 March 2022	14 September 2023	28 July 2033		N. V. Ramana
Sunder Mohan	Bar	6 June 2022	14 September 2023	1 November 2031		N. V. Ramana
Kabali Kumaresh Babu	Bar	6 June 2022	14 September 2023	13 December 2031		N. V. Ramana
Lekshmana Chandra Victoria Gowri	Bar	7 February 2023	24 September 2024	20 May 2035		D. Y. Chandrachud
Pillaipakkam Bahukutumbi Balaji	Bar	7 February 2023	24 September 2024	10 April 2035		D. Y. Chandrachud
Kandhasami Kulandaivelu Ramakrishnan	Bar	7 February 2023	24 September 2024	26 May 2035		D. Y. Chandrachud
Ramachandran Kalaimathi	Service	7 February 2023	24 September 2024	17 April 2030		D. Y. Chandrachud
K. Govindarajan Thilakavadi	Service	7 February 2023	24 September 2024	25 April 2028		D. Y. Chandrachud
Venkatachari Lakshminarayanan	Bar	27 February 2023	14 February 2025	3 October 2032		D. Y. Chandrachud
Periyasamy Vadamalai	Service	27 March 2023	14 February 2025	2 April 2028		D. Y. Chandrachud
Ramasamy Sakthivel	Service	23 May 2023	10 March 2025	20 July 2035		D. Y. Chandrachud
P. Dhanabal	Service	23 May 2023	10 March 2025	4 March 2036		D. Y. Chandrachud
Chinnasamy Kumarappan	Service	23 May 2023	5 May 2025	14 July 2034		D. Y. Chandrachud
Kandasamy Rajasekar	Service	23 May 2023	5 May 2025	28 April 2037		D. Y. Chandrachud
N. Senthilkumar	Bar	16 October 2023	26 September 2025	11 October 2032		D. Y. Chandrachud
G. Arul Murugan	Bar	16 October 2023	26 September 2025	26 May 2038		D. Y. Chandrachud
R. Poornima	Service	24 September 2024	15 April 2026	2 July 2028		D. Y. Chandrachud
M. Jothiraman	Service	24 September 2024	15 April 2026	3 June 2034		D. Y. Chandrachud
Augustine Devadoss Maria Clete	Service	24 September 2024	15 April 2026	5 November 2027		D. Y. Chandrachud
Krishnaswamy Govindarajan	Bar	--	9 August 2026	7 March 2034		Surya Kant
Rajnish Pathiyil	Bar	--	9 August 2026	27 February 2035		Surya Kant
Natarajan Ramesh	Bar	--	9 August 2026	3 March 2035		Surya Kant
G. K. Muthukumaar	Bar	--	9 August 2026	9 October 2036		Surya Kant
Ramakrishnan Rajesh Vivekananthan	Bar	--	9 August 2026	2 January 2037		Surya Kant

Additional judges
Name of Addl. Judge	Source	Date of appointment	Date of expiry of present term	Nominated as Judge by
Sankaranarayanan Raveekumar	Bar	9 August 2026	8 August 2028	Surya Kant
Nagarajan Dilip Kumar	Bar	9 August 2026	8 August 2028	Surya Kant
Ellappan Manoharan	Bar	9 August 2026	8 August 2028	Surya Kant
Dr. P. Murugan	Service	9 August 2026	8 August 2028	Surya Kant
M. D. Sumathi	Service	9 August 2026	8 August 2028	Surya Kant
S. Alli	Service	9 August 2026	10 June 2028	Surya Kant
Thirumagal Chandrasekar	Service	9 August 2026	4 August 2028	Surya Kant
Shanmugam Karthikeyan	Service	9 August 2026	8 August 2028	Surya Kant
Baluchamy Murugesan	Service	9 August 2026	8 August 2028	Surya Kant
N. Gunasekaran	Service	9 August 2026	8 August 2028	Surya Kant
Dharmalingam Lingeswaran	Service	15 October 2026	14 October 2028	Surya Kant
Balathandayutham Karthikeyan	Service	15 October 2026	14 October 2028	Surya Kant

Judges transferred from Madras High Court
Name of the Judge	Source	Date of Appointment as Addl. Judge	Date of Appointment As Pmt. Judge	Date of retirement	Remarks
M. Sundar	Bar	--	5 October 2016	18 July 2028	CJ of Manipur
J. Nisha Banu	Bar	--	5 October 2016	17 September 2028	Transferred to Kerala
Subramonium Prasad	Bar	4 June 2018	17 March 2020	21 June 2029	Transferred to Delhi

Current Judges elevated to Supreme Court
Name of the Judge	Image	Date of Appointment as Judge	Date of elevation to Supreme Court	Date of retirement
M. M. Sundresh		31 March 2009	31 August 2021	20 July 2027
R. Mahadevan		25 October 2013	18 July 2024	9 June 2028

== Manipur High Court ==
The Manipur High Court sits at Imphal and has jurisdiction over the state of Manipur. It is permitted to have a maximum of 5 judges of which 4 may be permanently appointed and 1 may be additionally appointed. Currently, it has 3 judges.

Permanent Judges
Name of the Judge	Source	Date of Appointment as Addl. Judge	Date of Appointment As Pmt. Judge	Date of retirement	Remarks	Nominated as Judge by
M. Sundar (CJ)	Bar	--	5 October 2016	18 July 2028	CJ w.e.f. 15.09.2025 (PHC: Madras)	T. S. Thakur
Ahanthem Bimol Singh	Bar	18 March 2020	13 March 2022	31 January 2028		S. A. Bobde
Aribam Guneshwar Sharma	Service	--	6 February 2023	28 February 2029		D. Y. Chandrachud

Additional Judges
Name of Addl. Judge	Source	Date of appointment	Date of expire of the present term	Nominated as Judge by
--	--	--	--	--

Judges transferred from Manipur High Court
Name of the Judge	Source	Date of Appointment as Addl. Judge	Date of Appointment As Pmt. Judge	Date of retirement	Remarks
--	--	--	--	--	--

Current Judges elevated to Supreme Court
Name of the Judge	Image	Date of Appointment as Judge	Date of elevation to Supreme Court	Date of retirement
Nongmeikapam Kotiswar Singh		17 October 2011	18 July 2024	29 February 2028

== Meghalaya High Court ==
The Meghalaya High Court sits at Shillong and has jurisdiction over the state of Meghalaya. It is permitted to have a maximum of 4 judges, all of whom must be permanently appointed. Currently, it has 4 judges. There is no provision for appointment of Additional Judges in Meghalaya High Court.

Permanent Judges
Name of the Judge	Source	Date of Appointment as Addl. Judge	Date of Appointment As Pmt. Judge	Date of retirement	Remarks	Nominated as Judge by
Revati Prashant Mohite Dere (CJ)	Bar	21 June 2013	2 March 2016	16 April 2027	CJ w.e.f. 10.01.2026 (PHC: Bombay)	Altamas Kabir
Hamarsan Singh Thangkhiew	Bar	--	19 November 2018	23 December 2028		Dipak Misra
Wanlura Diengdoh	Service	--	15 November 2019	8 November 2027		Ranjan Gogoi
Biswadeep Bhattacharjee	Bar	1 August 2023	31 July 2025	25 March 2030		D. Y. Chandrachud

There is no provision of additional judges in Meghalaya High Court.

Judges transferred from Meghalaya High Court
Name of the Judge	Source	Date of Appointment as Addl. Judge	Date of Appointment As Pmt. Judge	Date of retirement	Remarks
--	--	--	--	--	

Current Judges elevated to Supreme Court
Name of the Judge	Image	Date of Appointment as Judge	Date of elevation to Supreme Court	Date of retirement
--	--	--	--	--

== Orissa High Court ==
The Orissa High Court sits at Cuttack and has jurisdiction over the state of Odisha. It is permitted to have a maximum of 33 judges of which 24 may be permanently appointed and 9 may be additionally appointed. Currently, it has 13 judges.

Permanent judges
Name of the Judge	Source	Date of Appointment as Addl. Judge	Date of Appointment As Pmt. Judge	Date of retirement	Remarks	Nominated as Judge by
Bibhu Prasad Routray (ACJ)	Service	--	8 November 2019	31 January 2032	ACJ w.e.f. 16.11.2026	Ranjan Gogoi
Dr Sanjeeb Kumar Panigrahi	Bar	--	10 February 2020	28 July 2034		Ranjan Gogoi
Savitri Ratho	Bar	--	11 June 2020	3 July 2030		S. A. Bobde
Mruganka Sekhar Sahoo	Bar	--	19 October 2021	6 September 2033		N. V. Ramana
Radha Krishna Pattanaik	Service	--	19 October 2021	24 October 2032		N. V. Ramana
Sashikanta Mishra	Service	--	19 October 2021	16 January 2029		N. V. Ramana
Aditya Kumar Mohapatra	Bar	--	5 November 2021	25 February 2031		N. V. Ramana
V. Narasingh	Bar	--	14 February 2022	18 January 2029		N. V. Ramana
Biraja Prasanna Satapathy	Bar	--	14 February 2022	19 August 2028		N. V. Ramana
Murahari Sri Raman	Bar	--	14 February 2022	7 June 2032		N. V. Ramana
Sanjay Kumar Mishra	Bar	--	10 June 2022	13 November 2029		N. V. Ramana
Gourishankar Satapathy	Service	--	13 August 2022	24 April 2034		N. V. Ramana
Sibo Sankar Mishra	Bar	--	5 September 2023	2 May 2030		D. Y. Chandrachud

Additional Judges
Name of Addl. Judge	Source	Date of appointment	Date of expire of the present term	Nominated as Judge by
--	--	--	--	--

Judges transferred from Orissa High Court
Name of the Judge	Source	Date of Appointment as Addl. Judge	Date of Appointment As Pmt. Judge	Date of retirement	Remarks
Krushna Ram Mohapatra	Bar	17 April 2015	7 April 2017	17 April 2027	CJ of Chhattisgarh

Current Judges elevated to Supreme Court
Name of the Judge	Image	Date of Appointment as Judge	Date of elevation to Supreme Court	Date of retirement
--	--	--	--	--

== Patna High Court ==
The Patna High Court sits at Patna, and has jurisdiction over the state of Bihar. It may have a maximum of 53 judges, of which 40 may be permanently appointed and 13 may be additionally appointed. Currently, it has 43 judges.

Permanent Judges
Name of the Judge	Source	Date of Appointment As Addl. Judge	Date of Appointment as Pmt. Judge	Date of retirement	Remarks	Nominated as Judge by
Valluri Kameswar Rao (CJ)	Bar	17 April 2013	18 March 2015	6 August 2027	CJ w.e.f. 13.09.2026 (PHC: Delhi)	Altamas Kabir
Sudhir Singh	Bar	15 April 2015	20 April 2016	10 December 2027		H. L. Dattu
Rajeev Ranjan Prasad	Bar	22 May 2017	8 April 2019	4 September 2028		J.S. Khehar
Mohit Kumar Shah	Bar	22 May 2017	8 April 2019	25 April 2031		J.S. Khehar
Nani Tagia	Bar	19 November 2018	10 November 2020	15 May 2031	Joined on 01.11.2023 (PHC: Gauhati)	Dipak Misra
Sanjay Kumar Singh	Bar	22 November 2018	20 November 2020	20 January 2031	Joined on 30.10.2025 (PHC: Allahabad)	Dipak Misra
Anil Kumar Sinha	Bar	--	17 April 2019	18 June 2027		Ranjan Gogoi
Prabhat Kumar Singh	Bar	--	17 April 2019	1 January 2029		Ranjan Gogoi
Partha Sarthy	Bar	--	17 April 2019	21 October 2031		Ranjan Gogoi
Annireddy Abhishek Reddy	Bar	--	26 August 2019	6 November 2029	Joined on 15.05.2023 (PHC: Telangana)	Ranjan Gogoi
Sandeep Kumar	Bar	--	20 October 2021	19 January 2029		N. V. Ramana
Purnendu Singh	Bar	--	20 October 2021	3 February 2029		N. V. Ramana
Satyavrat Verma	Bar	--	20 October 2021	5 December 2030		N. V. Ramana
Rajesh Kumar Verma	Bar	--	20 October 2021	11 December 2031		N. V. Ramana
Gunnu Anupama Chakravarthy	Service	--	24 March 2022	20 March 2032	Joined on 01.11.2023 (PHC: Telangana)	N. V. Ramana
Rajiv Roy	Bar	--	29 March 2022	31 October 2027		N. V. Ramana
Harish Kumar	Bar	--	29 March 2022	9 January 2037		N. V. Ramana
Shailendra Singh	Service	--	4 June 2022	3 June 2034		N. V. Ramana
Arun Kumar Jha	Service	--	4 June 2022	16 October 2033		N. V. Ramana
Jitendra Kumar	Service	--	4 June 2022	1 November 2031		N. V. Ramana
Alok Kumar Pandey	Service	--	4 June 2022	31 August 2033		N. V. Ramana
Sunil Dutta Mishra	Service	--	4 June 2022	19 December 2029		N. V. Ramana
Chandra Shekhar Jha	Service	--	4 June 2022	31 December 2030		N. V. Ramana
Khatim Reza	Bar	--	5 June 2022	4 December 2028		N. V. Ramana
Anshuman	Bar	--	5 June 2022	10 June 2031		N. V. Ramana
Rudra Prakash Mishra	Service	--	4 November 2023	14 February 2034		D. Y. Chandrachud
Ramesh Chand Malviya	Service	--	4 November 2023	30 June 2027		D. Y. Chandrachud
Shashi Bhushan Prasad Singh	Service	--	4 October 2024	15 January 2027		D. Y. Chandrachud
Ashok Kumar Pandey	Service	--	4 October 2024	16 September 2028		D. Y. Chandrachud
Alok Kumar Sinha	Bar	--	8 March 2025	7 September 2032		Sanjiv Khanna
Sourendra Pandey	Bar	--	8 March 2025	10 December 2032		Sanjiv Khanna
Soni Shrivastava	Bar	--	8 March 2025	11 August 2036		Sanjiv Khanna
Ajit Kumar	Bar	--	4 August 2025	21 November 2036		B. R. Gavai
Ritesh Kumar	Bar	--	8 January 2026	1 July 2033		Sanjiv Khanna
Praveen Kumar	Bar	--	8 January 2026	20 October 2039		B. R. Gavai
Ansul	Bar	--	27 January 2026	11 July 2033		Sanjiv Khanna
Ranjan Kumar Jha	Bar	--	15 June 2026	14 November 2033		Surya Kant
Kumar Manish	Bar	--	15 June 2026	22 May 2034		Surya Kant
Raj Kumar	Bar	--	15 June 2026	24 March 2033		Surya Kant

Additional Judges
Name of Addl. Judge	Source	Date of appointment	Date of expire of the present term	Nominated as Judge by
Rana Vikram Singh	Bar	15 June 2026	14 June 2028	Surya Kant
Vikash Kumar	Bar	15 June 2026	14 June 2028	Surya Kant
Girijish Kumar	Bar	15 June 2026	14 June 2028	Surya Kant
Alok Kumar	Bar	15 June 2026	14 June 2028	Surya Kant

Judges transferred from Patna High Court
Name of the Judge	Source	Date of Appointment as Addl. Judge	Date of Appointment As Pmt. Judge	Date of retirement	Remarks
Ashutosh Kumar	Bar	15 May 2014	21 April 2016	30 September 2028	CJ of Gauhati
Madhuresh Prasad	Bar	22 May 2017	8 April 2019	1 October 2030	Transferred to Calcutta

Current Judges elevated to Supreme Court
Name of the Judge	Image	Date of Appointment as Judge	Date of elevation to Supreme Court	Date of retirement
Ahsanuddin Amanullah		20 June 2011	6 February 2023	10 May 2028

== Punjab and Haryana High Court ==
The Punjab and Haryana High Court sits at Chandigarh, and has jurisdiction over the states of Punjab and Haryana and the union territory of Chandigarh. It may have a maximum of 85 judges of which 64 may be permanently appointed and 21 may be additionally appointed. Currently, it has 64 judges.

Permanent Judges
Name of the Judge	Source	Date of Appointment As Addl. Judge	Date of Appointment as Pmt. Judge	Date of retirement	Remarks	Nominated as Judge by
Ashwani Kumar Mishra (CJ)	Bar	3 February 2014	1 February 2016	15 November 2030	CJ w.e.f. 07.09.2026; Joined on 21.07.2025 (PHC: Allahabad)	P. Sathasivam
Deepak Sibal	Bar	25 September 2014	23 May 2016	2 September 2029		Rajendra Mal Lodha
Harsimran Singh Sethi	Bar	29 October 2018	11 September 2020	21 October 2029		Dipak Misra
Anoop Chitkara	Bar	--	30 May 2019	28 April 2028	Joined on 12.10.2021 (PHC: HP)	Ranjan Gogoi
Suvir Sehgal	Bar	26 October 2019	24 October 2021	6 June 2027		Ranjan Gogoi
Alka Sarin	Bar	26 October 2019	24 October 2021	20 June 2028		Ranjan Gogoi
Jasgurpreet Singh Puri	Bar	22 November 2019	24 October 2021	29 August 2027		Ranjan Gogoi
Archana Puri	Service	28 November 2019	24 October 2021	12 December 2026		Ranjan Gogoi
Rajesh Kumar Bhardwaj	Bar	14 September 2020	24 October 2021	9 January 2028		S. A. Bobde
Vikas Bahl	Bar	25 May 2021	8 May 2023	24 September 2035		S. A. Bobde
Vikas Suri	Bar	29 October 2021	8 May 2023	4 September 2030		N. V. Ramana
Sandeep Moudgil	Bar	29 October 2021	8 May 2023	16 March 2033		N. V. Ramana
Vinod S. Bhardwaj	Bar	29 October 2021	8 May 2023	22 May 2036		N. V. Ramana
Pankaj Jain	Bar	29 October 2021	8 May 2023	17 June 2036		N. V. Ramana
Jasjit Singh Bedi	Bar	29 October 2021	8 May 2023	5 July 2036		N. V. Ramana
Lapita Banerji	Bar	9 June 2022	1 February 2024	22 June 2035	Joined on 01.02.2024 (PHC: Calcutta)	Ranjan Gogoi
Nidhi Gupta	Bar	16 August 2022	28 September 2023	27 July 2028		N. V. Ramana
Sanjay Vashisth	Bar	16 August 2022	28 September 2023	27 September 2030		N. V. Ramana
Tribhuvan Dahiya	Bar	16 August 2022	28 September 2023	22 January 2030		N. V. Ramana
Namit Kumar	Bar	16 August 2022	28 September 2023	3 April 2029		N. V. Ramana
Harkesh Manuja	Bar	16 August 2022	28 September 2023	19 April 2034		N. V. Ramana
Aman Chaudhary	Bar	16 August 2022	28 September 2023	17 December 2034		N. V. Ramana
Naresh Singh Shekhawat	Bar	16 August 2022	28 September 2023	20 June 2036		N. V. Ramana
Harsh Bunger	Bar	16 August 2022	28 September 2023	14 December 2033		N. V. Ramana
Jagmohan Bansal	Bar	16 August 2022	28 September 2023	6 November 2036		N. V. Ramana
Deepak Manchanda	Bar	16 August 2022	28 September 2023	12 January 2037		N. V. Ramana
Alok Jain	Bar	16 August 2022	28 September 2023	25 January 2037		N. V. Ramana
Kuldeep Tiwari	Bar	2 November 2022	12 March 2024	14 May 2039		N. V. Ramana
Deepak Gupta	Service	2 November 2022	12 March 2024	19 November 2027		N. V. Ramana
Amarjot Bhatti	Service	2 November 2022	12 March 2024	21 September 2027		N. V. Ramana
Manisha Batra	Service	2 November 2022	12 March 2024	21 September 2028		N. V. Ramana
Harpreet Kaur Jeewan	Service	2 November 2022	12 March 2024	3 June 2028		N. V. Ramana
Sukhvinder Kaur	Service	2 November 2022	12 March 2024	28 December 2026		N. V. Ramana
Sanjiv Berry	Service	2 November 2022	12 March 2024	27 November 2026		N. V. Ramana
Vikram Aggarwal	Service	2 November 2022	12 March 2024	11 August 2033		N. V. Ramana
Harpreet Singh Brar	Bar	10 April 2023	7 January 2025	19 December 2037		N. V. Ramana
Sumeet Goel	Bar	6 November 2023	1 April 2025	22 November 2034		D. Y. Chandrachud
Sudeepti Sharma	Bar	6 November 2023	1 April 2025	6 March 2031		D. Y. Chandrachud
Kirti Singh	Bar	6 November 2023	1 April 2025	29 August 2035		D. Y. Chandrachud
Harmeet Singh Grewal	Bar	17 February 2025	6 July 2026	31 October 2031		D. Y. Chandrachud
Deepinder Singh Nalwa	Bar	17 February 2025	6 July 2026	7 June 2032		D. Y. Chandrachud
Rohit Kapoor	Bar	28 May 2025	10 September 2026	30 September 2037		D. Y. Chandrachud

Additional Judges
Name of Addl. Judge	Source	Date of appointment	Date of expiry of present term	Nominated as Judge by
Virinder Aggarwal	Service	4 August 2025	3 August 2027	B. R. Gavai
Mandeep Pannu	Service	4 August 2025	3 August 2027	B. R. Gavai
Amarinder Singh Grewal	Service	4 August 2025	3 August 2027	B. R. Gavai
Parmod Goyal	Service	4 August 2025	3 August 2027	B. R. Gavai
Rupinderjit Chahal	Service	4 August 2025	3 August 2027	B. R. Gavai
Shalini Singh Nagpal	Service	4 August 2025	3 August 2027	B. R. Gavai
Subhas Mehla	Service	4 August 2025	3 August 2027	B. R. Gavai
Surya Partap Singh	Service	4 August 2025	3 August 2027	B. R. Gavai
Aaradhna Sawhney	Service	4 August 2025	3 August 2027	B. R. Gavai
Yashvir Singh Rathor	Service	4 August 2025	3 August 2027	B. R. Gavai
Ramesh Kumari	Service	20 August 2025	9 June 2027	B. R. Gavai
Ramesh Chander Dimri	Service	8 January 2026	7 January 2028	Surya Kant
Neerja Kulwant Kalson	Service	8 January 2026	7 January 2028	Surya Kant
Monica Chhibber Sharma	Bar	21 August 2026	20 August 2028	Surya Kant
Harmeet Singh Deol	Bar	21 August 2026	20 August 2028	Surya Kant
Pravindra Singh Chauhan	Bar	21 August 2026	20 August 2028	Surya Kant
Rajesh Gaur	Bar	21 August 2026	20 August 2028	Surya Kant
Puja Chopra	Bar	21 August 2026	20 August 2028	Surya Kant
Sunish Bindlish	Bar	21 August 2026	20 August 2028	Surya Kant
Minderjeet Yadav	Bar	21 August 2026	20 August 2028	Surya Kant
Divya Sharma	Bar	21 August 2026	20 August 2028	Surya Kant
Ravinder Malik	Bar	21 August 2026	20 August 2028	Surya Kant

Judges transferred from Punjab and Haryana High Court
Name of the Judge	Source	Date of Appointment as Addl. Judge	Date of Appointment As Pmt. Judge	Date of retirement	Remarks
Gurmeet Singh Sandhawalia	Bar	30 September 2011	24 January 2014	31 October 2027	CJ of HP
Lisa Gill	Bar	31 March 2014	19 December 2014	16 November 2028	CJ of AP
Avneesh Jhingan	Bar	10 July 2017	3 December 2018	28 January 2031	Transferred to Delhi
Arun Monga	Bar	29 October 2018	11 September 2020	20 December 2030	Transferred to Rajasthan
Manoj Bajaj	Bar	29 October 2018	11 September 2020	22 June 2028	Transferred to Allahabad

Current Judges elevated to Supreme Court
Name of the Judge	Image	Date of Appointment as Judge	Date of elevation to Supreme Court	Date of retirement
Surya Kant (Chief Justice of India)		9 January 2004	24 May 2019	9 February 2027
Augustine George Masih		10 July 2008	9 November 2023	11 March 2028
Arun Palli		28 December 2013	2 June 2026	17 September 2029

== Rajasthan High Court ==
The Rajasthan High Court sits at Jodhpur and has jurisdiction over the state of Rajasthan. It may have a maximum of 50 judges of which 38 may be permanently appointed and 12 may be additionally appointed. Currently, it has 38 judges.

Permanent Judges
Name of the Judge	Source	Date of Appointment as Addl. Judge	Date of Appointment As Pmt. Judge	Date of retirement	Remarks	Nominated as Judge by
Sanjay Kumar Agrawal (CJ)	Bar	16 September 2013	8 March 2016	14 July 2027	CJ w.e.f. 07.09.2026 (PHC: Chhattisgarh)	P. Sathasivam
Vinit Kumar Mathur	Bar	16 November 2016	16 March 2018	30 March 2032		T. S. Thakur
Inderjeet Singh	Bar	16 May 2017	31 August 2018	24 July 2027		J.S. Khehar
Arun Monga	Bar	29 October 2018	11 September 2020	20 December 2030	Joined on 29.10.2025 (PHC: P&H)	Dipak Misra
Mahendar Kumar Goyal	Bar	--	6 November 2019	22 March 2029		Ranjan Gogoi
Munnuri Laxman	Service	--	15 October 2021	23 December 2027	Joined on 01.11.2023 (PHC: Telangana)	N. V. Ramana
Farjand Ali	Bar	--	18 October 2021	14 December 2030		Ranjan Gogoi
Sudesh Bansal	Bar	--	18 October 2021	4 May 2034		N. V. Ramana
Anoop Kumar Dhand	Bar	--	18 October 2021	16 March 2035		N. V. Ramana
Vinod Kumar Bharwani	Service	--	18 October 2021	8 July 2028		N. V. Ramana
Uma Shanker Vyas	Service	--	29 October 2021	15 June 2028		N. V. Ramana
Rekha Borana	Bar	--	29 October 2021	1 December 2035		N. V. Ramana
Sameer Jain	Bar	--	29 October 2021	4 March 2036		N. V. Ramana
Kuldeep Mathur	Bar	--	6 June 2022	9 December 2032		N. V. Ramana
Shubha Mehta	Service	--	6 June 2022	4 July 2028		N. V. Ramana
Ganesh Ram Meena	Bar	--	16 January 2023	24 March 2028		N. V. Ramana
Anil Kumar Upman	Bar	--	16 January 2023	17 September 2033		D. Y. Chandrachud
Nupur Bhati	Bar	--	16 January 2023	11 February 2033		D. Y. Chandrachud
Ashok Kumar Jain	Service	--	16 January 2023	22 October 2029		D. Y. Chandrachud
Yogendra Kumar Purohit	Service	--	16 January 2023	28 October 2027		D. Y. Chandrachud
Bhuwan Goyal	Service	--	16 January 2023	25 March 2027		D. Y. Chandrachud
Praveer Bhatnagar	Service	--	16 January 2023	10 October 2027		D. Y. Chandrachud
Ashutosh Kumar	Service	--	16 January 2023	24 December 2029		D. Y. Chandrachud
Chandra Shekhar Sharma	Service	--	27 January 2025	2 July 2029		Sanjiv Khanna
Pramil Kumar Mathur	Service	--	27 January 2025	2 February 2028		Sanjiv Khanna
Chandra Prakash Shrimali	Service	--	27 January 2025	1 August 2027		Sanjiv Khanna
Maneesh Sharma	Bar	--	17 February 2025	5 February 2033		N. V. Ramana
Anand Sharma	Bar	--	28 March 2025	3 August 2033		Sanjiv Khanna
Sunil Beniwal	Bar	--	28 March 2025	31 May 2036		Sanjiv Khanna
Mukesh Rajpurohit	Bar	--	28 March 2025	14 May 2036		Sanjiv Khanna
Sandeep Shah	Bar	--	28 March 2025	14 August 2038		Sanjiv Khanna
Sandeep Taneja	Bar	--	23 July 2025	2 January 2037		Sanjiv Khanna

Additional Judges
Name of Addl. Judge	Source	Date of initial appointment	Date of expiry of the present term	Nominated as Judge by
Baljinder Singh Sandhu	Bar	23 July 2025	22 July 2027	Sanjiv Khanna
Bipin Gupta	Bar	23 July 2025	22 July 2027	B. R. Gavai
Sanjeet Purohit	Bar	23 July 2025	22 July 2027	B. R. Gavai
Ravi Chirania	Bar	23 July 2025	22 July 2027	B. R. Gavai
Anuroop Singhi	Bar	23 July 2025	22 July 2027	B. R. Gavai
Sangeeta Sharma	Service	23 July 2025	22 July 2027	B. R. Gavai

Judges transferred from Rajasthan High Court
Name of the Judge	Source	Date of Appointment as Addl. Judge	Date of Appointment As Pmt. Judge	Date of retirement	Remarks
Arun Bhansali	Bar	8 January 2013	7 January 2015	14 October 2029	CJ of Allahabad
Pushpendra Singh Bhati	Bar	16 November 2016	16 March 2018	20 September 2032	CJ of Jammu & Kashmir
Dinesh Mehta	Bar	16 November 2016	16 March 2018	27 January 2030	Transferred to Delhi

Current Judges elevated to Supreme Court
Name of the Judge	Image	Date of Appointment as Judge	Date of elevation to Supreme Court	Date of retirement
Sandeep Mehta		30 May 2011	9 November 2023	10 January 2028
Vijay Bishnoi		8 January 2013	30 May 2025	23 March 2029

== Sikkim High Court ==
The Sikkim High Court sits at Gangtok and has jurisdiction over the state of Sikkim. It may have a maximum of 3 judges, all of whom must be permanently appointed. Currently, it has 2 judges. There is no provision for appointment of Additional Judges in Sikkim High Court. As of 2026, no judge from the Sikkim High Court have been elevated to the Supreme Court.

Permanent Judges
Name of the Judge	Source	Date of Appointment as Addl. Judge	Date of Appointment As Pmt. Judge	Date of retirement	Remarks	Nominated as Judge by
Muhamed Mustaque Ayumantakath (CJ)	Bar	23 January 2014	10 March 2016	31 May 2029	CJ w.e.f. 04.01.2026 (PHC: Kerala)	P. Sathasivam
Bhaskar Raj Pradhan	Bar	--	23 May 2017	18 October 2028		J.S. Khehar

There is no provision of additional judges in Sikkim High Court.

Judges transferred from Sikkim High Court
Name of the Judge	Source	Date of Appointment as Addl. Judge	Date of Appointment As Pmt. Judge	Date of retirement	Remarks
--	--	--	--	--	--

Current Judges elevated to Supreme Court
Name of the Judge	Image	Date of Appointment as Judge	Date of elevation to Supreme Court	Date of retirement
--	--	--	--	--

== Telangana High Court ==
The Telangana High Court sits at Hyderabad and has jurisdiction over the state of Telangana. It may have a maximum of 42 Judges of which 32 may be permanently appointed and 10 may be additionally appointed. Currently, it has 26 judges.

Permanent Judges
Name of the Judge	Source	Date of Appointment as Addl. Judge	Date of Appointment As Pmt. Judge	Date of retirement	Remarks	Nominated as Judge by
Puthichira Sam Koshy (ACJ)	Bar	16 September 2013	8 March 2016	29 April 2029	ACJ w.e.f. 06.10.2026; Joined on 27.07.2023 (PHC: Chhattisgarh)	P. Sathasivam
Moushumi Bhattacharya	Bar	21 September 2017	16 September 2019	26 October 2029	Joined on 28.03.2023 (PHC: Calcutta)	Dipak Misra
Kunuru Lakshman	Bar	--	26 August 2019	7 June 2028		Ranjan Gogoi
Bollampally Vijaysen Reddy	Bar	--	2 May 2020	21 August 2032		S. A. Bobde
Noonsavath Tukaramji	Service	--	15 October 2021	23 January 2035		N. V. Ramana
Tangirala Madhavi Devi	Bar	--	15 October 2021	27 December 2027		N. V. Ramana
Surepalli Nanda	Bar	--	24 March 2022	3 April 2031		N. V. Ramana
Juvvadi Sridevi	Bar	--	24 March 2022	9 August 2034		N. V. Ramana
Natcharaju Shravan Kumar Venkat	Bar	--	24 March 2022	17 August 2029		N. V. Ramana
Chada Vijaya Bhaskar Reddy	Bar	--	4 August 2022	27 June 2030		N. V. Ramana
E. V. Venugopal	Bar	--	16 August 2022	15 August 2029		N. V. Ramana
Nagesh Bheemapaka	Bar	--	16 August 2022	7 March 2031		N. V. Ramana
P. Elamadar	Bar	--	16 August 2022	3 June 2029		N. V. Ramana
K. Sarath	Bar	--	16 August 2022	28 January 2033		N. V. Ramana
J. Srinivas Rao	Bar	16 August 2022	30 April 2024	30 August 2031		N. V. Ramana
Namavarapu Rajeshwar Rao	Bar	16 August 2022	30 April 2024	29 June 2031		N. V. Ramana
Laxmi Narayana Alishetty	Bar	31 July 2023	14 February 2025	12 May 2030		D. Y. Chandrachud
Anil Kumar Jukanti	Bar	31 July 2023	14 February 2025	27 December 2033		D. Y. Chandrachud
Sujana Kalasikam	Service	31 July 2023	14 February 2025	9 March 2032		D. Y. Chandrachud
Renuka Yara	Service	25 January 2025	27 April 2026	13 June 2035		Sanjiv Khanna
Narsing Rao Nandikonda	Service	25 January 2025	27 April 2026	2 May 2031		Sanjiv Khanna
Madhusudhan Rao Bobbili Ramaiah	Service	25 January 2025	27 April 2026	14 May 2031		Sanjiv Khanna

Additional Judges
Name of Addl. Judge	Source	Date of initial appointment	Date of expiry of present term	Nominated as Judge by
Gouse Meera Mohiuddin	Bar	31 July 2025	30 July 2027	B. R. Gavai
Chalapathi Rao Suddala	Bar	31 July 2025	30 July 2027	B. R. Gavai
Vakiti Ramakrishna Reddy	Bar	31 July 2025	30 July 2027	B. R. Gavai
Gadi Praveen Kumar	Bar	31 July 2025	30 July 2027	B. R. Gavai

Judges transferred from Telangana High Court
Name of the Judge	Source	Date of Appointment as Addl. Judge	Date of Appointment As Pmt. Judge	Date of retirement	Remarks
Mamidanna Satyaratna Ramachandra Rao	Bar	29 June 2012	4 December 2013	6 August 2028	CJ of Tripura
Todupunuri Amarnath Goud	Bar	--	21 September 2017	28 February 2027	Transferred to Tripura
Annireddy Abhishek Reddy	Bar	--	26 August 2019	6 November 2029	Transferred to Patna
Perugu Sree Sudha	Service	--	15 October 2021	5 June 2029	Transferred to Karnataka
Chillakur Sumalatha	Service	--	15 October 2021	4 February 2034	Transferred to Karnataka
Munnuri Laxman	Service	--	15 October 2021	23 December 2027	Transferred to Rajasthan
Mummineni Sudheer Kumar	Bar	--	24 March 2022	19 May 2031	Transferred to Madras
Kasoju Surendhar	Bar	--	24 March 2022	10 January 2030	Transferred to Madras
Gunnu Anupama Chakravarthy	Service	--	24 March 2022	20 March 2032	Transferred to Patna

Current Judges elevated to Supreme Court
Name of the Judge	Image	Date of Appointment as Judge	Date of elevation to Supreme Court	Date of retirement
Puligoru Venkata Sanjay Kumar		8 August 2008	6 February 2023	13 August 2028

== Tripura High Court ==
The Tripura High Court sits at Agartala and has jurisdiction over the state of Tripura. It may have a maximum of 5 judges of which 4 may be permanently appointed and 1 may be additionally appointed. Currently, it has 4 judges.

Permanent Judges
Name of the Judge	Source	Date of Appointment as Addl. Judge	Date of Appointment As Pmt. Judge	Date of retirement	Remarks	Nominated as Judge by
Mamidanna Satyratna Ramachandra Rao (CJ)	Bar	29 June 2012	4 December 2013	6 August 2028	CJ w.e.f. 22.07.2025 (PHC: Telangana)	S. H. Kapadia
Todupunuri Amarnath Goud	Bar	--	21 September 2017	28 February 2027	Joined on 28.10.2021 (PHC: Telangana)	Dipak Misra
Sabyasachi Datta Purkayastha	Service	--	26 October 2023	11 February 2032		D. Y. Chandrachud
Biswajit Palit	Service	26 October 2023	26 September 2025	4 May 2031		D. Y. Chandrachud

Additional Judges
Name of Addl. Judge	Source	Date of initial appointment	Date of expiry of present term	Nominated as Judge by
--	--	--	--	--

Judges transferred from Tripura High Court
Name of the Judge	Source	Date of Appointment as Addl. Judge	Date of Appointment As Pmt. Judge	Date of retirement	Remarks
--	--	--	--	--	--

Current Judges elevated to Supreme Court
Name of the Judge	Image	Date of Appointment as Judge	Date of elevation to Supreme Court	Date of retirement
--	--	--	--	--

== Uttarakhand High Court ==
The Uttarakhand High Court sits at Nainital and has jurisdiction over the state of Uttarakhand. It may have a maximum of 11 judges of which 9 may be permanently appointed and 2 may be additionally appointed. Currently, it has 7 judges.

Permanent Judges
Name of the Judge	Source	Date of Appointment as Addl. Judge	Date of Appointment As Pmt. Judge	Date of Retirement	Remarks	Nominated as Judge by
Manoj Kumar Tiwari (ACJ)	Bar	--	19 May 2017	18 September 2027	ACJ w.e.f. 09.10.2026	Jagdish Singh Khehar
Ravindra Maithani	Service	--	3 December 2018	24 June 2027		Ranjan Gogoi
Rakesh Thapliyal	Bar	--	28 April 2023	14 November 2027		D. Y. Chandrachud
Pankaj Purohit	Bar	--	28 April 2023	27 July 2030		D. Y. Chandrachud
Alok Mahra	Bar	--	14 February 2025	31 January 2034		D. Y. Chandrachud
Subhash Upadhyaya	Bar	30 May 2025	5 October 2026	11 December 2034		D. Y. Chandrachud

Additional Judges
Name of Addl. Judge	Source	Date of initial appointment	Date of expiry of the present term	Nominated as Judge by
Siddhartha Sah	Bar	8 January 2026	7 January 2028	D. Y. Chandrachud

Judges transferred from Uttarakhand High Court
Name of the Judge	Source	Date of Appointment as Addl. Judge	Date of Appointment As Pmt. Judge	Date of retirement	Remarks
--	--	--	--	--	--

Current Judges elevated to Supreme Court
Name of the Judge	Image	Date of Appointment as Judge	Date of elevation to Supreme Court	Date of retirement
--	--	--	--	--

== List of Judges by seniority (in cumulative) ==
Judge names which don't have date of retirement indicated are "Additional Judges".

Judge	Parent High Court	Date of Joining	Date of Retirement	Tenure	Current High Court
Soumen Sen (CJ)	Calcutta	13 April 2011	26 July 2027	16 years, 105 days	Kerala
Gurmeet Singh Sandhawalia (CJ)	Punjab and Haryana	30 September 2011	31 October 2027	16 years, 32 days	Himachal Pradesh
Mamidanna Satyratna Ramachandra Rao (CJ)	Telangana	29 June 2012	6 August 2028	16 years, 39 days	Tripura
Arun Bhansali (CJ)	Rajasthan	8 January 2013	14 October 2029	16 years, 280 days	Allahabad
Vibhu Bakhru (CJ)	Delhi	17 April 2013	1 November 2028	15 years, 199 days	Karnataka
Valluri Kameswar Rao (CJ)	Delhi	17 April 2013	6 August 2027	14 years, 112 days	Patna
Manash Ranjan Pathak (ACJ)	Gauhati	22 May 2013	27 August 2027	14 years, 98 days	Gujarat
Revati Prashant Mohite Dere (CJ)	Bombay	21 June 2013	16 April 2027	13 years, 300 days	Meghalaya
Mahesh Sharadchandra Sonak (CJ)	Bombay	21 June 2013	27 November 2026	13 years, 160 days	Jharkhand
Ravindra Vithalrao Ghuge (CJ)	Bombay	21 June 2013	8 July 2028	15 years, 18 days	Calcutta
Sanjay Kumar Agrawal (CJ)	Chhattisgarh	16 September 2013	14 July 2027	13 years, 302 days	Rajasthan
Puthichira Sam Koshy (ACJ)	Chhattisgarh	16 September 2013	29 April 2029	15 years, 226 days	Telangana
Mahesh Chandra Tripathi (CJ)	Allahabad	27 September 2013	20 June 2028	14 years, 268 days	Bombay
Tapabrata Chakraborty	Calcutta	30 October 2013	26 November 2028	15 years, 28 days	Calcutta
Arindam Sinha	Calcutta	30 October 2013	21 September 2027	13 years, 327 days	Allahabad
Arijit Banerjee	Calcutta	30 October 2013	6 March 2029	15 years, 128 days	Calcutta
Debangsu Basak	Calcutta	30 October 2013	18 June 2028	14 years, 233 days	Calcutta
Ajey Shrikant Gadkari	Bombay	6 January 2014	13 June 2027	13 years, 159 days	Bombay
Nitin Wasudeo Sambre (ACJ)	Bombay	6 January 2014	18 December 2029	15 years, 347 days	Delhi
Girish Sharadchandra Kulkarni	Bombay	6 January 2014	23 June 2030	16 years, 169 days	Bombay
Burgess Pesi Colabawalla	Bombay	6 January 2014	15 December 2029	15 years, 344 days	Bombay
Muhamed Mustaque Ayumantakath (CJ)	Kerala	23 January 2014	31 May 2029	15 years, 129 days	Sikkim
Ala Kunnil Jayasankaran Nambiar	Kerala	23 January 2014	26 January 2028	14 years, 4 days	Kerala
Anil Kolavampara Narendran	Kerala	23 January 2014	4 May 2029	15 years, 102 days	Kerala
Ashwani Kumar Mishra (CJ)	Allahabad	3 February 2014	15 November 2030	16 years, 286 days	Punjab and Haryana
Rajan Roy	Allahabad	3 February 2014	14 August 2027	13 years, 193 days	Allahabad
Lisa Gill (CJ)	Punjab and Haryana	31 March 2014	16 November 2028	14 years, 231 days	Andhra Pradesh
Ashutosh Kumar (CJ)	Patna	15 May 2014	30 September 2028	14 years, 139 days	Gauhati
Deepak Sibal	Punjab and Haryana	25 September 2014	2 September 2029	14 years, 343 days	Punjab and Haryana
Sujit Narayan Prasad	Jharkhand	26 September 2014	19 June 2029	14 years, 267 days	Jharkhand
Rongon Mukhopadhyay	Jharkhand	26 September 2014	28 December 2029	15 years, 94 days	Jharkhand
Yashwant Varma	Allahabad	13 October 2014	5 January 2031	16 years, 85 days	Allahabad
Michael Zothankhuma	Gauhati	7 January 2015	22 October 2027	12 years, 289 days	Gauhati
Suman Shyam	Gauhati	7 January 2015	11 June 2031	16 years, 156 days	Bombay
Anu Sivaraman	Kerala	10 April 2015	24 May 2028	13 years, 45 days	Karnataka
Raja Vijayaraghavan Valsala	Kerala	10 April 2015	27 May 2029	14 years, 48 days	Kerala
Sudhir Singh	Patna	15 April 2015	10 December 2027	12 years, 240 days	Patna
Krushna Ram Mohapatra (CJ)	Orissa	17 April 2015	17 April 2027	12 years, 1 day	Chhattisgarh
Makarand Subhash Karnik	Bombay	17 March 2016	9 February 2031	14 years, 330 days	Bombay
Alpesh Yeshwant Kogje (CJ)	Gujarat	6 April 2016	15 July 2031	15 years, 101 days	Madhya Pradesh
Arvindsingh Ishwarsingh Supehia	Gujarat	6 April 2016	30 August 2031	15 years, 147 days	Gujarat
Atul Sreedharan	Madhya Pradesh	7 April 2016	24 May 2028	12 years, 48 days	Allahabad
Sushrut Arvind Dharmadhikari (CJ)	Madhya Pradesh	7 April 2016	7 July 2028	12 years, 92 days	Madras
Vivek Rusia	Madhya Pradesh	7 April 2016	1 August 2031	15 years, 117 days	Madhya Pradesh
Anand Pathak	Madhya Pradesh	7 April 2016	17 July 2030	14 years, 102 days	Madhya Pradesh
Vivek Agarwal	Madhya Pradesh	7 April 2016	27 June 2029	13 years, 82 days	Madhya Pradesh
Ananda Sen	Jharkhand	8 April 2016	14 August 2031	15 years, 129 days	Jharkhand
Vivek Singh Thakur	Himachal Pradesh	12 April 2016	16 April 2028	12 years, 5 days	Himachal Pradesh
Ajay Mohan Goel	Himachal Pradesh	12 April 2016	10 January 2031	14 years, 274 days	Himachal Pradesh
Sandeep Sharma	Himachal Pradesh	12 April 2016	19 July 2030	14 years, 99 days	Himachal Pradesh
Rajesh Shankar	Jharkhand	30 September 2016	15 December 2032	16 years, 77 days	Jharkhand
M. Sundar (CJ)	Madras	5 October 2016	18 July 2028	11 years, 288 days	Manipur
J. Nisha Banu	Madras	5 October 2016	17 September 2028	11 years, 349 days	Kerala
S. M. Subramaniam	Madras	5 October 2016	30 May 2027	10 years, 238 days	Madras
Dr. Anita Sumanth	Madras	5 October 2016	14 April 2032	15 years, 193 days	Madras
P. Velmurugan	Madras	5 October 2016	8 June 2027	10 years, 247 days	Madras
Dr. G. Jayachandran	Madras	5 October 2016	31 March 2027	10 years, 178 days	Madras
C. V. Karthikeyan	Madras	5 October 2016	13 December 2026	10 years, 70 days	Madras
Sathish Ninan	Kerala	5 October 2016	31 March 2030	13 years, 178 days	Kerala
Devan Ramachandran	Kerala	5 October 2016	18 March 2030	13 years, 165 days	Kerala
Gurpal Singh Ahluwalia	Madhya Pradesh	13 October 2016	19 February 2028	11 years, 130 days	Madhya Pradesh
Subodh Abhyankar	Madhya Pradesh	13 October 2016	2 January 2031	14 years, 82 days	Madhya Pradesh
Kalyan Rai Surana	Gauhati	15 November 2016	12 December 2027	11 years, 28 days	Gauhati
Nelson Sailo	Gauhati	15 November 2016	8 October 2030	13 years, 328 days	Gauhati
Siddhartha Varma	Allahabad	15 November 2016	18 September 2029	12 years, 308 days	Allahabad
Sangeeta Chandra	Allahabad	15 November 2016	22 April 2030	13 years, 159 days	Allahabad
N. Sathish Kumar	Madras	16 November 2016	5 May 2029	12 years, 171 days	Madras
Pushpendra Singh Bhati (CJ)	Rajasthan	16 November 2016	20 September 2032	15 years, 310 days	Jammu & Kashmir and Ladakh
Dinesh Mehta	Rajasthan	16 November 2016	27 January 2030	13 years, 73 days	Delhi
Vinit Kumar Mathur	Rajasthan	16 November 2016	30 March 2032	15 years, 136 days	Rajasthan
Vivek Chaudhary	Allahabad	20 February 2017	12 May 2028	11 years, 83 days	Delhi
Saumitra Dayal Singh	Allahabad	20 February 2017	19 December 2031	14 years, 303 days	Allahabad
Prathiba M. Singh	Delhi	15 May 2017	19 July 2030	13 years, 66 days	Delhi
Navin Chawla	Delhi	15 May 2017	6 August 2031	14 years, 84 days	Delhi
C. Hari Shankar	Delhi	15 May 2017	3 May 2030	12 years, 354 days	Delhi
Inderjeet Singh	Rajasthan	16 May 2017	24 July 2027	10 years, 70 days	Rajasthan
Manoj Kumar Tiwari (ACJ)	Uttarakhand	19 May 2017	18 September 2027	10 years, 123 days	Uttarakhand
Anil Kumar Choudhary	Jharkhand	20 May 2017	17 June 2027	10 years, 29 days	Jharkhand
Rajeev Ranjan Prasad	Patna	22 May 2017	4 September 2028	11 years, 106 days	Patna
Madhuresh Prasad	Patna	22 May 2017	1 October 2030	13 years, 133 days	Calcutta
Mohit Kumar Shah	Patna	22 May 2017	25 April 2031	13 years, 339 days	Patna
Bhaskar Raj Pradhan	Sikkim	23 May 2017	18 October 2028	11 years, 149 days	Sikkim
Bharati Harish Dangre	Bombay	5 June 2017	9 May 2030	12 years, 339 days	Bombay
Sarang Vijaykumar Kotwal	Bombay	5 June 2017	12 April 2030	12 years, 312 days	Bombay
Riyaz Iqbal Chagla	Bombay	5 June 2017	21 October 2031	14 years, 149 days	Bombay
Manish Pitale	Bombay	5 June 2017	10 September 2032	15 years, 98 days	Bombay
Sanjeev Kumar	Jammu & Kashmir and Ladakh	6 June 2017	7 April 2028	10 years, 307 days	Jammu & Kashmir and Ladakh
A. D. Jagadish Chandira	Madras	28 June 2017	14 February 2028	10 years, 232 days	Madras
G. R. Swaminathan	Madras	28 June 2017	31 May 2030	12 years, 338 days	Madras
Abdul Quddhose	Madras	28 June 2017	7 September 2031	14 years, 72 days	Madras
M. Dhandapani	Madras	28 June 2017	14 April 2030	12 years, 291 days	Madras
Pondicherry Daivasigamani Audikesavalu	Madras	28 June 2017	29 December 2032	15 years, 185 days	Madras
Avneesh Jhingan	Punjab and Haryana	10 July 2017	28 January 2031	13 years, 203 days	Delhi
Rajasekhar Mantha	Calcutta	21 September 2017	28 October 2029	12 years, 38 days	Calcutta
Sabyasachi Bhattacharyya	Calcutta	21 September 2017	29 August 2032	14 years, 344 days	Calcutta
Moushumi Bhattacharya	Calcutta	21 September 2017	26 October 2029	12 years, 36 days	Telangana
Shekhar B. Saraf	Calcutta	21 September 2017	20 October 2033	16 years, 30 days	Allahabad
Rajarshi Bharadwaj	Calcutta	21 September 2017	3 August 2029	11 years, 317 days	Calcutta
Todupunuri Amarnath Goud	Telangana	21 September 2017	28 February 2027	9 years, 161 days	Tripura
Salil Kumar Rai	Allahabad	22 September 2017	7 August 2027	9 years, 320 days	Allahabad
Jayant Banerji	Allahabad	22 September 2017	16 January 2027	9 years, 117 days	Karnataka
Rajesh Singh Chauhan	Allahabad	22 September 2017	17 July 2028	10 years, 300 days	Allahabad
Irshad Ali	Allahabad	22 September 2017	11 December 2026	9 years, 81 days	Allahabad
Jahangir Jamshed Munir	Allahabad	22 September 2017	22 August 2029	11 years, 335 days	Allahabad
Rajiv Gupta	Allahabad	22 September 2017	21 October 2028	11 years, 30 days	Allahabad
Siddharth	Allahabad	22 September 2017	14 April 2027	9 years, 205 days	Allahabad
Ajit Kumar	Allahabad	22 September 2017	21 December 2030	13 years, 91 days	Allahabad
Rajnish Kumar	Allahabad	22 September 2017	9 August 2031	13 years, 322 days	Allahabad
Abdul Moin	Allahabad	22 September 2017	31 October 2030	13 years, 40 days	Allahabad
Dinesh Kumar Singh	Allahabad	22 September 2017	17 August 2028	10 years, 331 days	Karnataka
Rajeev Misra	Allahabad	22 September 2017	19 January 2031	13 years, 120 days	Allahabad
Vivek Kumar Singh	Allahabad	22 September 2017	24 March 2030	12 years, 184 days	Madhya Pradesh
Chandra Dhari Singh	Allahabad	22 September 2017	11 July 2031	13 years, 293 days	Allahabad
Ajay Bhanot	Allahabad	22 September 2017	3 August 2031	13 years, 316 days	Allahabad
Rajesh Kumar	Jharkhand	6 January 2018	25 October 2030	12 years, 293 days	Jharkhand
Anubha Rawat Choudhary	Jharkhand	6 January 2018	24 June 2032	14 years, 171 days	Jharkhand
Shankar Ganapathi Pandit	Karnataka	14 February 2018	15 November 2027	9 years, 275 days	Karnataka
Ramakrishna Devdas	Karnataka	14 February 2018	14 May 2031	13 years, 90 days	Karnataka
Bhotanhosur Mallikarjuna Shyam Prasad	Karnataka	14 February 2018	7 January 2033	14 years, 329 days	Karnataka
Siddappa Sunil Dutt Yadav	Karnataka	14 February 2018	2 August 2034	16 years, 170 days	Karnataka
Shampa Sarkar	Calcutta	12 March 2018	17 February 2030	11 years, 343 days	Calcutta
Ravi Krishan Kapur	Calcutta	12 March 2018	4 October 2033	15 years, 207 days	Calcutta
Arindam Mukherjee	Calcutta	12 March 2018	29 September 2030	12 years, 202 days	Calcutta
Amrita Sinha	Calcutta	2 May 2018	24 December 2031	13 years, 237 days	Calcutta
Jay Sen Gupta	Calcutta	2 May 2018	29 October 2032	14 years, 181 days	Calcutta
Mohammad Nawaz	Karnataka	2 June 2018	21 May 2027	8 years, 354 days	Karnataka
Harekoppa Thimmanna Gowda Narendra Prasad	Karnataka	2 June 2018	31 May 2028	9 years, 365 days	Karnataka
P. T. Asha	Madras	4 June 2018	21 August 2028	10 years, 79 days	Madras
N. Nirmal Kumar	Madras	4 June 2018	22 November 2027	9 years, 172 days	Madras
Subramonium Prasad	Madras	4 June 2018	21 June 2029	11 years, 18 days	Delhi
N. Anand Venkatesh	Madras	4 June 2018	3 July 2031	13 years, 30 days	Madras
G. K. Ilanthiraiyan	Madras	4 June 2018	8 July 2032	14 years, 35 days	Madras
Krishnan Ramasmy	Madras	4 June 2018	2 June 2030	11 years, 364 days	Madras
C. Saravanan	Madras	4 June 2018	30 November 2033	15 years, 180 days	Madras
Parth Prateem Sahu	Chhattisgarh	18 June 2018	18 April 2033	14 years, 305 days	Chhattisgarh
Sindhu Sharma	Jammu & Kashmir and Ladakh	7 August 2018	9 October 2034	16 years, 64 days	Jammu & Kashmir and Ladakh
Shriram Madhusudan Modak	Bombay	11 October 2018	12 November 2027	9 years, 33 days	Bombay
Jamadar Nijamoddin Jahiroddin	Bombay	11 October 2018	21 September 2034	15 years, 346 days	Bombay
Jyoti Singh	Delhi	22 October 2018	30 September 2028	9 years, 345 days	Delhi
Prateek Jalan	Delhi	22 October 2018	3 April 2032	13 years, 165 days	Delhi
Anup Jairam Bhambhani	Delhi	22 October 2018	4 December 2027	9 years, 44 days	Delhi
Sanjeev Narula	Delhi	22 October 2018	23 August 2032	13 years, 307 days	Delhi
Harsimran Singh Sethi	Punjab and Haryana	29 October 2018	21 October 2029	10 years, 358 days	Punjab and Haryana
Arun Monga	Punjab and Haryana	29 October 2018	20 December 2030	12 years, 53 days	Delhi
Manoj Bajaj	Punjab and Haryana	29 October 2018	22 June 2028	9 years, 238 days	Allahabad
Hethur Puttaswamygowda Sandesh	Karnataka	3 November 2018	1 December 2026	8 years, 29 days	Karnataka
Suvra Ghosh	Calcutta	19 November 2018	22 April 2030	11 years, 155 days	Calcutta
Sanjay Kumar Medhi	Gauhati	19 November 2018	6 March 2033	14 years, 108 days	Gauhati
Nani Tagia	Gauhati	19 November 2018	15 May 2031	12 years, 178 days	Patna
Hamarsan Singh Thangkhiew	Meghalaya	19 November 2018	23 December 2028	10 years, 35 days	Meghalaya
Manoj Kumar Ohri	Delhi	20 November 2018	11 November 2031	12 years, 357 days	Delhi
B. Pugalendhi	Madras	20 November 2018	24 May 2029	10 years, 186 days	Madras
Prakash Padia	Allahabad	22 November 2018	9 March 2027	8 years, 108 days	Allahabad
Pankaj Bhatia	Allahabad	22 November 2018	14 September 2028	9 years, 298 days	Allahabad
Saurabh Lavania	Allahabad	22 November 2018	16 April 2028	9 years, 147 days	Allahabad
Vivek Varma	Allahabad	22 November 2018	28 December 2031	13 years, 37 days	Allahabad
Sanjay Kumar Singh	Allahabad	22 November 2018	20 January 2031	12 years, 60 days	Patna
Piyush Agrawal	Allahabad	22 November 2018	5 November 2033	14 years, 349 days	Allahabad
Saurabh Shyam Shamsherry	Allahabad	22 November 2018	3 February 2031	12 years, 74 days	Allahabad
Jaspreet Singh	Allahabad	22 November 2018	28 August 2033	14 years, 280 days	Allahabad
Rajiv Singh	Allahabad	22 November 2018	2 April 2030	11 years, 132 days	Allahabad
Manju Rani Chauhan	Allahabad	22 November 2018	28 August 2028	9 years, 281 days	Allahabad
Karunesh Singh Pawar	Allahabad	22 November 2018	18 May 2033	14 years, 178 days	Allahabad
Dr Yogendra Kumar Srivastava	Allahabad	22 November 2018	29 December 2027	9 years, 38 days	Allahabad
Manish Mathur	Allahabad	22 November 2018	8 June 2034	15 years, 199 days	Allahabad
Rohit Ranjan Agarwal	Allahabad	22 November 2018	4 July 2033	14 years, 225 days	Allahabad
Rajbeer Singh	Allahabad	22 November 2018	5 December 2026	8 years, 14 days	Allahabad
Ravindra Maithani	Uttarakhand	3 December 2018	24 June 2027	8 years, 204 days	Uttarakhand
Manish Choudhury	Gauhati	18 January 2019	28 February 2034	15 years, 42 days	Gauhati
Tirthankar Ghosh	Calcutta	12 February 2019	28 September 2030	11 years, 229 days	Calcutta
Hiranmay Bhattacharyya	Calcutta	12 February 2019	17 December 2030	11 years, 309 days	Calcutta
Saugata Bhattacharyya	Calcutta	12 February 2019	26 July 2034	15 years, 165 days	Calcutta
Sanjay Kumar Dwivedi	Jharkhand	18 February 2019	2 November 2027	8 years, 258 days	Jharkhand
Deepak Roshan	Jharkhand	18 February 2019	11 December 2029	10 years, 297 days	Jharkhand
Senthilkumar Ramamoorthy	Madras	22 February 2019	1 October 2028	9 years, 223 days	Madras
Bhargav Dhirenbhai Karia	Gujarat	5 March 2019	22 December 2027	8 years, 293 days	Gujarat
Sangeeta Kamalsingh Vishen	Gujarat	5 March 2019	29 December 2031	12 years, 300 days	Gujarat
Anil Kumar Sinha	Patna	17 April 2019	18 June 2027	8 years, 63 days	Patna
Prabhat Kumar Singh	Patna	17 April 2019	1 January 2029	9 years, 260 days	Patna
Partha Sarthy	Patna	17 April 2019	21 October 2031	12 years, 188 days	Patna
Vishal Dhagat	Madhya Pradesh	27 May 2019	13 December 2031	12 years, 201 days	Madhya Pradesh
Vishal Mishra	Madhya Pradesh	27 May 2019	16 July 2036	17 years, 51 days	Madhya Pradesh
Anoop Chitkara	Himachal Pradesh	30 May 2019	28 April 2028	8 years, 335 days	Punjab and Haryana
Jyotsna Rewal Dua	Himachal Pradesh	30 May 2019	24 May 2031	11 years, 360 days	Himachal Pradesh
Nitin Bhagawantrao Suryawanshi	Bombay	23 August 2019	29 May 2028	8 years, 281 days	Bombay
Anil Satyavijay Kilor	Bombay	23 August 2019	2 September 2028	9 years, 11 days	Bombay
Milind Narendra Jadhav	Bombay	23 August 2019	13 August 2031	11 years, 356 days	Bombay
Annireddy Abhishek Reddy	Telangana	26 August 2019	6 November 2029	10 years, 73 days	Patna
Kunuru Lakshman	Telangana	26 August 2019	7 June 2028	8 years, 287 days	Telangana
Singapuram Raghavachar Krishna Kumar	Karnataka	23 September 2019	6 May 2032	12 years, 227 days	Karnataka
Ashok Subhashchandra Kinagi	Karnataka	23 September 2019	31 December 2031	12 years, 100 days	Karnataka
Suraj Govindaraj	Karnataka	23 September 2019	13 May 2035	15 years, 233 days	Karnataka
Sachin Shankar Magadum	Karnataka	23 September 2019	4 May 2034	14 years, 224 days	Karnataka
Kausik Chanda	Calcutta	1 October 2019	3 January 2036	16 years, 95 days	Calcutta
Suvir Sehgal	Punjab and Haryana	26 October 2019	6 June 2027	7 years, 224 days	Punjab and Haryana
Alka Sarin	Punjab and Haryana	26 October 2019	20 June 2028	8 years, 239 days	Punjab and Haryana
Mahendar Kumar Goyal	Rajasthan	6 November 2019	22 March 2029	9 years, 137 days	Rajasthan
Bibhu Prasad Routray (ACJ)	Orissa	8 November 2019	31 January 2032	12 years, 85 days	Orissa
Neranahalli Srinivasan Sanjay Gowda	Karnataka	11 November 2019	14 February 2029	9 years, 96 days	Gujarat
Jyoti Mulimani	Karnataka	11 November 2019	14 August 2030	10 years, 277 days	Karnataka
Nataraj Rangaswamy	Karnataka	11 November 2019	13 March 2032	12 years, 124 days	Karnataka
Hemant Chandangoudar	Karnataka	11 November 2019	27 September 2031	11 years, 321 days	Madras
Pradeep Singh Yerur	Karnataka	11 November 2019	20 June 2032	12 years, 223 days	Karnataka
Wanlura Diengdoh	Meghalaya	15 November 2019	8 November 2027	7 years, 359 days	Meghalaya
Conrad Stansilaus Dias	Kerala	18 November 2019	18 November 2031	12 years, 1 day	Kerala
Jasgurpreet Singh Puri	Punjab and Haryana	22 November 2019	29 August 2027	7 years, 281 days	Punjab and Haryana
Maheshan Nagaprasanna	Karnataka	26 November 2019	22 March 2033	13 years, 117 days	Karnataka
Soumitra Saikia	Gauhati	26 November 2019	24 July 2031	11 years, 241 days	Gauhati
Parthivjyoti Saikia	Gauhati	26 November 2019	17 April 2027	7 years, 143 days	Gauhati
Archana Puri	Punjab and Haryana	28 November 2019	12 December 2026	7 years, 15 days	Punjab and Haryana
Nitin Rudrasen Borkar	Bombay	5 December 2019	1 August 2033	13 years, 240 days	Bombay
Ravi Nath Tilhari	Allahabad	12 December 2019	8 February 2031	11 years, 59 days	Andhra Pradesh
Deepak Verma	Allahabad	12 December 2019	29 March 2027	7 years, 108 days	Allahabad
Shamim Ahmed	Allahabad	12 December 2019	7 March 2028	8 years, 87 days	Madras
Dinesh Pathak	Allahabad	12 December 2019	6 January 2034	14 years, 26 days	Allahabad
Manish Kumar	Allahabad	12 December 2019	15 September 2032	12 years, 279 days	Allahabad
Samit Gopal	Allahabad	12 December 2019	29 December 2033	14 years, 18 days	Allahabad
Madhav Jayajirao Jamdar	Bombay	7 January 2020	12 January 2029	9 years, 6 days	Bombay
Maralur Indrakumar Arun	Karnataka	7 January 2020	23 April 2032	12 years, 108 days	Karnataka
Engalaguppe Seetharamaiah Indiresh	Karnataka	7 January 2020	15 April 2034	14 years, 99 days	Karnataka
Ravi Venkappa Hosmani	Karnataka	7 January 2020	28 July 2033	13 years, 203 days	Karnataka
Battu Devanand	Andhra Pradesh	13 January 2020	13 April 2028	8 years, 92 days	Andhra Pradesh
Donadi Ramesh	Andhra Pradesh	13 January 2020	26 June 2027	7 years, 165 days	Andhra Pradesh
Ninala Jayasurya	Andhra Pradesh	13 January 2020	26 August 2030	10 years, 226 days	Andhra Pradesh
Amit Bhalchandra Borkar	Bombay	14 January 2020	1 January 2034	13 years, 353 days	Bombay
Sanjeeb Kumar Panigrahi	Orissa	10 February 2020	28 July 2034	14 years, 169 days	Orissa
Pulleri Vadhyarillath Kunhikrishnan	Kerala	13 February 2020	21 May 2029	9 years, 98 days	Kerala
Ilesh Jashvantrai Vora	Gujarat	3 March 2020	17 August 2027	7 years, 168 days	Gujarat
Gita Gopi	Gujarat	3 March 2020	23 March 2028	8 years, 21 days	Gujarat
Abhay Ahuja	Bombay	4 March 2020	23 August 2031	11 years, 173 days	Bombay
Thirumuppath Raghavan Ravi	Kerala	6 March 2020	1 March 2027	6 years, 361 days	Kerala
Bechu Kurian Thomas	Kerala	6 March 2020	4 December 2030	10 years, 274 days	Kerala
Gopinath Puzhankara	Kerala	6 March 2020	12 November 2034	14 years, 252 days	Kerala
Ahanthem Bimol Singh	Manipur	18 March 2020	31 January 2028	7 years, 320 days	Manipur
Rajnesh Oswal	Jammu & Kashmir and Ladakh	2 April 2020	16 June 2035	15 years, 76 days	Jammu & Kashmir and Ladakh
Sanjay Dhar	Jammu & Kashmir and Ladakh	7 April 2020	10 May 2027	7 years, 34 days	Jammu & Kashmir and Ladakh
Savanur Vishwajith Shetty	Karnataka	28 April 2020	18 May 2029	9 years, 21 days	Karnataka
Bollampally Vijaysen Reddy	Telangana	2 May 2020	21 August 2032	12 years, 112 days	Telangana
Bopuddi Krishna Mohan	Andhra Pradesh	2 May 2020	4 February 2027	6 years, 279 days	Andhra Pradesh
Kanchireddy Suresh Reddy	Andhra Pradesh	2 May 2020	6 December 2026	6 years, 219 days	Andhra Pradesh
Kanneganti Lalithakumari	Andhra Pradesh	2 May 2020	4 May 2033	13 years, 3 days	Karnataka
Shivashankar Amarannavar	Karnataka	4 May 2020	19 July 2032	12 years, 77 days	Karnataka
Vedavyasachar Srishananda	Karnataka	4 May 2020	28 March 2028	7 years, 330 days	Karnataka
Hanchate Sanjeev Kumar	Karnataka	4 May 2020	12 May 2033	13 years, 9 days	Karnataka
Aniruddha Roy	Calcutta	5 May 2020	14 October 2031	11 years, 163 days	Calcutta
Savitri Ratho	Orissa	11 June 2020	3 July 2030	10 years, 23 days	Orissa
Rajesh Kumar Bhardwaj	Punjab and Haryana	14 September 2020	9 January 2028	7 years, 118 days	Punjab and Haryana
Sanjay Kumar Pachori	Allahabad	16 September 2020	28 February 2027	6 years, 166 days	Allahabad
Vaibhavi Devang Nanavati	Gujarat	4 October 2020	14 November 2032	12 years, 42 days	Gujarat
Nirzarkumar Sushilkumar Desai	Gujarat	4 October 2020	14 June 2035	14 years, 254 days	Gujarat
Nikhil Shreedharan Kariel	Gujarat	4 October 2020	9 May 2036	15 years, 219 days	Gujarat
Murali Shankar Kuppuraju	Madras	3 December 2020	30 May 2030	9 years, 179 days	Madras
Thamilselvi T. Valayapalayam	Madras	3 December 2020	18 June 2030	9 years, 198 days	Madras
Jasmeet Singh	Delhi	24 February 2021	25 February 2030	9 years, 2 days	Delhi
Amit Bansal	Delhi	24 February 2021	7 February 2031	9 years, 349 days	Delhi
Murali Purushothaman	Kerala	25 February 2021	30 July 2029	8 years, 156 days	Kerala
Ziyad Rahman Alevakkatt Abdul Rahiman	Kerala	25 February 2021	11 May 2034	13 years, 76 days	Kerala
Kauser Edappagath	Kerala	25 February 2021	24 May 2030	9 years, 89 days	Kerala
Mohammed Ghouse Shukure Kamal	Karnataka	17 March 2021	29 June 2033	12 years, 105 days	Karnataka
Narendra Kumar Vyas	Chhattisgarh	22 March 2021	4 October 2032	11 years, 197 days	Chhattisgarh
Naresh Kumar Chandravanshi	Chhattisgarh	22 March 2021	5 November 2027	6 years, 229 days	Chhattisgarh
Vikas Bahl	Punjab and Haryana	25 May 2021	24 September 2035	14 years, 123 days	Punjab and Haryana
Robin Phukan	Gauhati	21 June 2021	28 February 2028	6 years, 253 days	Gauhati
Abdul Rahim Musaliar Badharudeen	Kerala	25 June 2021	28 May 2030	8 years, 338 days	Kerala
Shivkumar Ganpatrao Dige	Bombay	25 June 2021	2 August 2033	12 years, 39 days	Bombay
Viju Abraham	Kerala	13 August 2021	10 September 2034	13 years, 29 days	Kerala
Mohammed Nias Chovvakkaran Puthiyapurayil	Kerala	13 August 2021	15 April 2032	10 years, 247 days	Kerala
Pranay Verma	Madhya Pradesh	27 August 2021	11 December 2035	14 years, 107 days	Madhya Pradesh
Sugato Majumdar	Calcutta	27 August 2021	24 December 2029	8 years, 120 days	Calcutta
Bivas Pattanayak	Calcutta	27 August 2021	22 November 2032	11 years, 88 days	Calcutta
Purushaindra Kumar Kaurav	Madhya Pradesh	8 October 2021	3 October 2038	16 years, 361 days	Delhi
Basant Balaji	Kerala	8 October 2021	27 May 2034	12 years, 232 days	Kerala
Sanjay Prasad	Jharkhand	8 October 2021	16 January 2027	5 years, 101 days	Jharkhand
Devashis Baruah	Gauhati	13 October 2021	21 February 2035	13 years, 132 days	Gauhati
Chandra Kumar Rai	Allahabad	13 October 2021	14 October 2027	6 years, 2 days	Allahabad
Krishan Pahal	Allahabad	13 October 2021	22 June 2030	8 years, 253 days	Allahabad
Sameer Jain	Allahabad	13 October 2021	25 February 2030	8 years, 136 days	Allahabad
Ashutosh Srivastava	Allahabad	13 October 2021	2 December 2026	5 years, 51 days	Allahabad
Subhash Vidyarthi	Allahabad	13 October 2021	29 April 2032	10 years, 200 days	Allahabad
Brij Raj Singh	Allahabad	13 October 2021	6 August 2032	10 years, 299 days	Allahabad
Shree Prakash Singh	Allahabad	13 October 2021	7 February 2036	14 years, 118 days	Allahabad
Vikas Budhwar	Allahabad	13 October 2021	27 June 2035	13 years, 258 days	Allahabad
Perugu Sree Sudha	Telangana	15 October 2021	5 June 2029	7 years, 234 days	Karnataka
Chillakur Sumalatha	Telangana	15 October 2021	4 December 2034	13 years, 51 days	Karnataka
Munnuri Laxman	Telangana	15 October 2021	23 December 2027	6 years, 70 days	Rajasthan
Noonsavath Tukaramji	Telangana	15 October 2021	23 January 2035	13 years, 101 days	Telangana
Patlolla Madhavi Devi	Telangana	15 October 2021	27 December 2027	6 years, 74 days	Telangana
Farjand Ali	Rajasthan	18 October 2021	14 December 2030	9 years, 58 days	Rajasthan
Sudesh Bansal	Rajasthan	18 October 2021	4 May 2034	12 years, 199 days	Rajasthan
Anoop Kumar Dhand	Rajasthan	18 October 2021	16 March 2035	13 years, 150 days	Rajasthan
Vinod Kumar Bharwani	Rajasthan	18 October 2021	8 July 2028	6 years, 265 days	Rajasthan
Samir Jyotindraprasad Dave	Gujarat	18 October 2021	27 July 2029	7 years, 283 days	Gujarat
Hemant Maheshchandra Prachchhak	Gujarat	18 October 2021	3 June 2027	5 years, 229 days	Gujarat
Sandeep Natvarlal Bhatt	Gujarat	18 October 2021	15 September 2029	7 years, 333 days	Madhya Pradesh
Aniruddha Pradyumna Mayee	Gujarat	18 October 2021	1 July 2032	10 years, 258 days	Gujarat
Niral Rashmikant Mehta	Gujarat	18 October 2021	27 October 2038	17 years, 10 days	Gujarat
Nisha Mahendrabhai Thakore	Gujarat	18 October 2021	2 December 2037	16 years, 46 days	Gujarat
Mruganka Sekhar Sahoo	Orissa	19 October 2021	6 September 2033	11 years, 323 days	Orissa
Radha Krishna Pattanaik	Orissa	19 October 2021	24 October 2032	11 years, 6 days	Orissa
Sashikanta Mishra	Orissa	19 October 2021	16 January 2029	7 years, 90 days	Orissa
Sundaram Srimathy	Madras	20 October 2021	9 January 2029	7 years, 82 days	Madras
D. Bharatha Chakravarthy	Madras	20 October 2021	23 July 2033	11 years, 277 days	Madras
R. Vijayakumar	Madras	20 October 2021	21 December 2032	11 years, 63 days	Madras
Mohammed Shaffiq	Madras	20 October 2021	5 March 2034	12 years, 137 days	Madras
Chandrasekharan Kartha Jayachandran	Kerala	20 October 2021	27 May 2034	12 years, 220 days	Kerala
Sandeep Kumar	Patna	20 October 2021	19 January 2029	7 years, 92 days	Patna
Purnendu Singh	Patna	20 October 2021	3 February 2029	7 years, 107 days	Patna
Satyavrat Verma	Patna	20 October 2021	5 December 2030	9 years, 47 days	Patna
Rajesh Kumar Verma	Patna	20 October 2021	11 December 2031	10 years, 53 days	Patna
Anil Laxman Pansare	Bombay	21 October 2021	13 November 2027	6 years, 24 days	Bombay
Sandipkumar Chandrabhan More	Bombay	21 October 2021	6 April 2028	6 years, 169 days	Bombay
Vikram D Chauhan	Allahabad	27 October 2021	22 September 2036	14 years, 332 days	Allahabad
Uma Shanker Vyas	Rajasthan	29 October 2021	15 June 2028	6 years, 231 days	Rajasthan
Vikas Suri	Punjab and Haryana	29 October 2021	4 September 2030	8 years, 311 days	Punjab and Haryana
Sandeep Moudgil	Punjab and Haryana	29 October 2021	16 March 2033	11 years, 139 days	Punjab and Haryana
Vinod Sharma (Bhardwaj)	Punjab and Haryana	29 October 2021	22 May 2036	14 years, 207 days	Punjab and Haryana
Pankaj Jain	Punjab and Haryana	29 October 2021	17 June 2036	14 years, 233 days	Punjab and Haryana
Jasjit Singh Bedi	Punjab and Haryana	29 October 2021	5 July 2036	14 years, 251 days	Punjab and Haryana
Rekha Borana	Rajasthan	29 October 2021	1 December 2035	14 years, 34 days	Rajasthan
Sameer Jain	Rajasthan	29 October 2021	4 March 2036	14 years, 128 days	Rajasthan
Arun Dev Choudhury	Gauhati	5 November 2021	28 October 2033	11 years, 358 days	Gauhati
Aditya Kumar Mohapatra	Orissa	5 November 2021	25 February 2031	9 years, 113 days	Orissa
Anant Ramanath Hegde	Karnataka	8 November 2021	6 March 2033	11 years, 119 days	Karnataka
Siddaiah Rachaiah	Karnataka	8 November 2021	31 May 2029	7 years, 205 days	Karnataka
Kannakuzhyil Sreedharan Hemalekha	Karnataka	8 November 2021	27 March 2037	15 years, 140 days	Karnataka
Mohd. Akram Chowdhary	Jammu & Kashmir and Ladakh	9 November 2021	9 June 2027	5 years, 213 days	Jammu & Kashmir and Ladakh
Krishna Rao	Calcutta	18 November 2021	2 March 2028	6 years, 106 days	Calcutta
Ajoy Kumar Mukherjee	Calcutta	18 November 2021	7 January 2027	5 years, 51 days	Calcutta
Kumbhajadala Manmadha Rao	Andhra Pradesh	8 December 2021	12 June 2028	6 years, 188 days	Karnataka
Boddupalli Sri Bhanumathi	Andhra Pradesh	8 December 2021	30 August 2030	8 years, 266 days	Andhra Pradesh
Konakanti Sreenivasa Reddy	Andhra Pradesh	14 February 2022	2 June 2028	6 years, 110 days	Andhra Pradesh
Venkateswarlu Nimmagadda	Andhra Pradesh	14 February 2022	30 June 2029	7 years, 137 days	Andhra Pradesh
Tarlada Rajasekhar Rao	Andhra Pradesh	14 February 2022	2 August 2029	7 years, 170 days	Andhra Pradesh
Satti Subba Reddy	Andhra Pradesh	14 February 2022	4 February 2032	9 years, 356 days	Andhra Pradesh
Ravi Cheemalapati	Andhra Pradesh	14 February 2022	3 December 2029	7 years, 293 days	Andhra Pradesh
Vaddiboyana Sujatha	Andhra Pradesh	14 February 2022	9 September 2028	6 years, 209 days	Andhra Pradesh
V. Narasingh	Orissa	14 February 2022	18 January 2029	6 years, 340 days	Orissa
Biraja Prasanna Satapathy	Orissa	14 February 2022	19 August 2028	6 years, 188 days	Orissa
Murahari Sri Raman	Orissa	14 February 2022	7 June 2032	10 years, 115 days	Orissa
Maninder Singh Bhatti	Madhya Pradesh	15 February 2022	2 November 2030	8 years, 261 days	Madhya Pradesh
Dwarka Dhish Bansal	Madhya Pradesh	15 February 2022	16 February 2030	8 years, 2 days	Madhya Pradesh
Milind Ramesh Phadke	Madhya Pradesh	15 February 2022	5 November 2033	11 years, 264 days	Madhya Pradesh
Neena Bansal Krishna	Delhi	28 February 2022	17 June 2027	5 years, 110 days	Delhi
Dinesh Kumar Sharma	Delhi	28 February 2022	20 September 2027	5 years, 205 days	Calcutta
Mummineni Sudheer Kumar	Telangana	24 March 2022	19 May 2031	9 years, 57 days	Madras
Kasoju Surendhar	Telangana	24 March 2022	10 January 2030	7 years, 293 days	Madras
Surepalli Nanda	Telangana	24 March 2022	3 April 2031	9 years, 11 days	Telangana
Juvvadi Sridevi	Telangana	24 March 2022	9 August 2034	12 years, 139 days	Telangana
Natcharaju Shravan Kumar Venkat	Telangana	24 March 2022	17 August 2029	7 years, 147 days	Telangana
Gunnu Anupama Chakravarthy	Telangana	24 March 2022	20 March 2032	9 years, 363 days	Patna
Swarana Kanta Sharma	Delhi	28 March 2022	4 August 2030	8 years, 130 days	Delhi
Rahul Bharti	Jammu & Kashmir and Ladakh	28 March 2022	30 July 2029	7 years, 125 days	Jammu & Kashmir and Ladakh
Moksha Khajuria Kazmi	Jammu & Kashmir and Ladakh	28 March 2022	31 December 2034	12 years, 279 days	Jammu & Kashmir and Ladakh
Nidumolu Mala	Madras	28 March 2022	23 April 2029	7 years, 27 days	Madras
S. Sounthar	Madras	28 March 2022	28 July 2033	11 years, 123 days	Madras
Rajiv Roy	Patna	29 March 2022	31 October 2027	5 years, 217 days	Patna
Harish Kumar	Patna	29 March 2022	9 January 2037	14 years, 287 days	Patna
Sachin Singh Rajput	Chhattisgarh	16 May 2022	26 January 2034	11 years, 256 days	Chhattisgarh
Tara Vitasta Ganju	Delhi	18 May 2022	11 August 2033	11 years, 86 days	Karnataka
Mini Pushkarna	Delhi	18 May 2022	30 November 2033	11 years, 197 days	Delhi
Vikas Mahajan	Delhi	18 May 2022	7 August 2031	9 years, 82 days	Delhi
Tushar Rao Gedela	Delhi	18 May 2022	17 July 2029	7 years, 61 days	Delhi
Manmeet Pritam Singh Arora	Delhi	18 May 2022	13 February 2036	13 years, 272 days	Delhi
Sachin Datta	Delhi	18 May 2022	14 August 2035	13 years, 89 days	Delhi
Amit Mahajan	Delhi	18 May 2022	19 April 2036	13 years, 338 days	Delhi
Gaurang Kanth	Delhi	18 May 2022	19 August 2037	14 years, 237 days	Calcutta
Saurabh Banerjee	Delhi	18 May 2022	19 January 2038	15 years, 247 days	Delhi
Shoba Annamma Eapen	Kerala	18 May 2022	18 January 2029	6 years, 246 days	Kerala
Ananya Bandyopadhyay	Calcutta	18 May 2022	2 March 2032	9 years, 290 days	Calcutta
Rai Chattopadhyay	Calcutta	18 May 2022	1 November 2033	11 years, 168 days	Calcutta
Subhendu Samanta	Calcutta	18 May 2022	24 November 2033	11 years, 191 days	Andhra Pradesh
Anish Dayal	Delhi	2 June 2022	14 March 2035	12 years, 286 days	Delhi
Amit Sharma	Delhi	2 June 2022	6 July 2034	12 years, 35 days	Delhi
Wasim Sadiq Nargal	Jammu & Kashmir and Ladakh	3 June 2022	30 July 2030	8 years, 58 days	Jammu & Kashmir and Ladakh
Shailendra Singh	Patna	4 June 2022	3 June 2034	12 years, 0 days	Patna
Arun Kumar Jha	Patna	4 June 2022	16 October 2033	11 years, 135 days	Patna
Jitendra Kumar	Patna	4 June 2022	1 November 2031	9 years, 151 days	Patna
Alok Kumar Pandey	Patna	4 June 2022	31 August 2033	11 years, 89 days	Patna
Sunil Dutta Mishra	Patna	4 June 2022	19 December 2029	7 years, 199 days	Patna
Chandra Shekhar Jha	Patna	4 June 2022	31 December 2030	8 years, 211 days	Patna
Khatim Reza	Patna	5 June 2022	4 December 2028	6 years, 183 days	Patna
Anshuman	Patna	5 June 2022	10 June 2031	9 years, 6 days	Patna
Sunder Mohan	Madras	6 June 2022	1 November 2031	9 years, 149 days	Madras
Kabali Kumaresh Babu	Madras	6 June 2022	13 December 2031	9 years, 191 days	Madras
Kuldeep Mathur	Rajasthan	6 June 2022	9 December 2032	10 years, 187 days	Rajasthan
Shubha Mehta	Rajasthan	6 June 2022	4 July 2028	6 years, 29 days	Rajasthan
Urmila Sachin Joshi-Phalke	Bombay	6 June 2022	14 April 2030	7 years, 313 days	Bombay
Pradeep Kumar Srivastava	Jharkhand	7 June 2022	31 December 2027	5 years, 208 days	Jharkhand
Raja Basu Chowdhury	Calcutta	9 June 2022	19 October 2032	10 years, 133 days	Calcutta
Lapita Banerji	Calcutta	9 June 2022	22 June 2035	13 years, 14 days	Punjab and Haryana
Sanjay Kumar Mishra	Orissa	10 June 2022	13 November 2029	7 years, 157 days	Orissa
Cheppudira Monappa Poonacha	Karnataka	13 June 2022	5 April 2033	10 years, 297 days	Karnataka
Kishore Chandrakant Sant	Bombay	19 July 2022	6 October 2029	7 years, 80 days	Bombay
Valmiki SA Menezes	Bombay	19 July 2022	28 July 2029	7 years, 10 days	Bombay
Kamal Rashmi Khata	Bombay	19 July 2022	25 November 2031	9 years, 130 days	Bombay
Sharmila Uttamrao Deshmukh	Bombay	19 July 2022	27 February 2030	7 years, 224 days	Bombay
Arun Ramnath Pedneker	Bombay	19 July 2022	23 June 2033	10 years, 340 days	Bombay
Sandeep Vishnupant Marne	Bombay	19 July 2022	8 December 2035	13 years, 143 days	Bombay
Gauri Vinod Godse	Bombay	19 July 2022	7 October 2034	12 years, 81 days	Bombay
Rajesh Shantaram Patil	Bombay	19 July 2022	20 July 2031	9 years, 2 days	Bombay
Arif Saleh Doctor	Bombay	19 July 2022	16 July 2034	11 years, 363 days	Bombay
Rajesh Sekhri	Jammu & Kashmir and Ladakh	29 July 2022	25 September 2027	5 years, 59 days	Jammu & Kashmir and Ladakh
Rakesh Mohan Pandey	Chhattisgarh	2 August 2022	29 January 2032	9 years, 181 days	Chhattisgarh
Saurabh Srivastava	Allahabad	3 August 2022	29 July 2037	14 years, 361 days	Allahabad
Om Prakash Shukla	Allahabad	3 August 2022	19 April 2039	16 years, 260 days	Delhi
Chada Vijaya Bhaskar Reddy	Telangana	4 August 2022	27 June 2030	7 years, 328 days	Telangana
Gourishankar Satapathy	Orissa	13 August 2022	24 April 2034	11 years, 255 days	Orissa
E. V. Venugopal	Telangana	16 August 2022	15 August 2029	7 years, 0 days	Telangana
Nagesh Bheemapaka	Telangana	16 August 2022	7 March 2031	8 years, 204 days	Telangana
P. Elamadar	Telangana	16 August 2022	3 June 2029	6 years, 292 days	Telangana
K. Sharath	Telangana	16 August 2022	28 January 2033	10 years, 166 days	Telangana
J. Srinivas Rao	Telangana	16 August 2022	30 August 2031	9 years, 15 days	Telangana
Namavarapu Rajeshwar Rao	Telangana	16 August 2022	29 June 2031	8 years, 318 days	Telangana
Sushil Kukreja	Himachal Pradesh	16 August 2022	13 April 2029	6 years, 241 days	Himachal Pradesh
Virender Singh	Himachal Pradesh	16 August 2022	13 November 2028	6 years, 90 days	Himachal Pradesh
Mitali Thakuria	Gauhati	16 August 2022	31 December 2026	4 years, 138 days	Gauhati
Gurusiddaiah Basavaraja	Karnataka	16 August 2022	2 May 2027	4 years, 260 days	Karnataka
Nidhi Gupta	Punjab and Haryana	16 August 2022	27 July 2028	5 years, 347 days	Punjab and Haryana
Sanjay Vashisth	Punjab and Haryana	16 August 2022	27 September 2030	8 years, 43 days	Punjab and Haryana
Tribhuvan Dahiya	Punjab and Haryana	16 August 2022	22 January 2030	7 years, 160 days	Punjab and Haryana
Namit Kumar	Punjab and Haryana	16 August 2022	3 April 2029	6 years, 231 days	Punjab and Haryana
Harkesh Manuja	Punjab and Haryana	16 August 2022	19 April 2034	11 years, 247 days	Punjab and Haryana
Aman Chaudhary	Punjab and Haryana	16 August 2022	17 December 2034	12 years, 124 days	Punjab and Haryana
Naresh Singh	Punjab and Haryana	16 August 2022	20 June 2036	13 years, 310 days	Punjab and Haryana
Harsh Bunger	Punjab and Haryana	16 August 2022	14 December 2033	11 years, 121 days	Punjab and Haryana
Jagmohan Bansal	Punjab and Haryana	16 August 2022	6 November 2036	14 years, 83 days	Punjab and Haryana
Deepak Manchanda	Punjab and Haryana	16 August 2022	12 January 2037	14 years, 150 days	Punjab and Haryana
Alok Jain	Punjab and Haryana	16 August 2022	25 January 2037	14 years, 163 days	Punjab and Haryana
Biswaroop Chowdhury	Calcutta	31 August 2022	28 September 2027	5 years, 29 days	Calcutta
Partha Sarathi Sen	Calcutta	31 August 2022	2 July 2031	8 years, 306 days	Calcutta
Prasenjit Biswas	Calcutta	31 August 2022			Calcutta
Uday Kumar	Calcutta	31 August 2022			Calcutta
Ajay Kumar Gupta	Calcutta	31 August 2022			Calcutta
Supratim Bhattacharya	Calcutta	31 August 2022			Calcutta
Partha Sarathi Chatterjee	Calcutta	31 August 2022			Calcutta
Apurba Sinha Ray	Calcutta	31 August 2022	24 November 2026	4 years, 86 days	Calcutta
Md. Shabbar Rashidi	Calcutta	31 August 2022			Calcutta
Sanjay Anandrao Deshmukh	Bombay	7 October 2022	11 May 2029	6 years, 217 days	Bombay
Yanshivraj Gopichand Khobragade	Bombay	7 October 2022	8 May 2028	5 years, 215 days	Bombay
Mahendra Wadhumal Chandwani	Bombay	7 October 2022	23 May 2033	10 years, 229 days	Bombay
Abhay Sopanrao Waghwase	Bombay	7 October 2022	9 December 2028	6 years, 64 days	Bombay
Ravindra Madhusudan Joshi	Bombay	7 October 2022	28 September 2029	6 years, 357 days	Bombay
Vrushali Vijay Joshi	Bombay	7 October 2022	5 December 2026	4 years, 60 days	Bombay
Kuldeep Tiwari	Punjab and Haryana	2 November 2022	14 May 2039	16 years, 194 days	Punjab and Haryana
Deepak Gupta	Punjab and Haryana	2 November 2022	19 November 2027	5 years, 18 days	Punjab and Haryana
Amarjot Bhatti	Punjab and Haryana	2 November 2022	21 September 2027	4 years, 324 days	Punjab and Haryana
Manisha Batra	Punjab and Haryana	2 November 2022	21 September 2028	5 years, 325 days	Punjab and Haryana
Harpreet Kaur Jeewan	Punjab and Haryana	2 November 2022	3 June 2028	5 years, 215 days	Punjab and Haryana
Sukhvinder Kaur	Punjab and Haryana	2 November 2022	28 December 2026	4 years, 57 days	Punjab and Haryana
Sanjiv Berry	Punjab and Haryana	2 November 2022	27 November 2026	4 years, 26 days	Punjab and Haryana
Vikram Aggarwal	Punjab and Haryana	2 November 2022	11 August 2033	10 years, 283 days	Punjab and Haryana
Santosh Govindrao Chapalgaonkar	Bombay	30 November 2022	3 March 2035	12 years, 94 days	Bombay
Milind Manohar Sathaye	Bombay	30 November 2022	5 September 2036	13 years, 281 days	Bombay
Ganesh Ram Meena	Rajasthan	16 January 2023	24 March 2028	5 years, 69 days	Rajasthan
Anil Kumar Upman	Rajasthan	16 January 2023	17 September 2033	10 years, 245 days	Rajasthan
Nupur Bhati	Rajasthan	16 January 2023	11 February 2033	10 years, 27 days	Rajasthan
Ashok Kumar Jain	Rajasthan	16 January 2023	22 October 2029	6 years, 280 days	Rajasthan
Yogendra Kumar Purohit	Rajasthan	16 January 2023	28 October 2027	4 years, 286 days	Rajasthan
Bhuwan Goyal	Rajasthan	16 January 2023	25 March 2027	4 years, 69 days	Rajasthan
Praveer Bhatnagar	Rajasthan	16 January 2023	10 October 2027	4 years, 268 days	Rajasthan
Ashutosh Kumar	Rajasthan	16 January 2023	24 December 2029	6 years, 343 days	Rajasthan
Venkatesh Naik Thavaryanaik	Karnataka	24 January 2023	31 May 2037	14 years, 128 days	Karnataka
Venkata Jyothirmai Pratapa	Andhra Pradesh	27 January 2023	31 July 2034	11 years, 186 days	Andhra Pradesh
Neela Kedar Gokhale	Bombay	30 January 2023	2 May 2031	8 years, 93 days	Bombay
Aribam Guneshwar Sharma	Manipur	6 February 2023	28 February 2029	6 years, 23 days	Manipur
Syed Qamar Hasan Rizvi	Allahabad	7 February 2023	18 November 2029	6 years, 285 days	Allahabad
Manish Kumar Nigam	Allahabad	7 February 2023	14 June 2029	6 years, 128 days	Allahabad
Anish Kumar Gupta	Allahabad	7 February 2023	2 January 2036	12 years, 330 days	Allahabad
Nand Prabha Shukla	Allahabad	7 February 2023	29 June 2035	12 years, 143 days	Allahabad
Kshitij Shailendra	Allahabad	7 February 2023	13 July 2037	14 years, 157 days	Allahabad
Vinod Diwakar	Allahabad	7 February 2023	14 September 2038	15 years, 220 days	Allahabad
Lekshmana Chandra Victoria Gowri	Madras	7 February 2023	20 May 2035	12 years, 103 days	Madras
Pillaipakkam Bahukutumbi Balaji	Madras	7 February 2023	10 April 2035	12 years, 63 days	Madras
Kandhasami Kulandaivelu Ramakrishnan	Madras	7 February 2023	26 May 2035	12 years, 109 days	Madras
Ramachandran Kalaimathi	Madras	7 February 2023	17 April 2030	7 years, 70 days	Madras
K. Govindarajan Thilakavadi	Madras	7 February 2023	25 April 2028	5 years, 79 days	Madras
Vijaykumar Adagouda Patil	Karnataka	9 February 2023	13 October 2037	14 years, 247 days	Karnataka
Rajesh Rai Kallangala	Karnataka	9 February 2023	31 May 2036	13 years, 113 days	Karnataka
Prashant Kumar	Allahabad	27 February 2023	29 May 2029	6 years, 92 days	Allahabad
Manjive Shukla	Allahabad	27 February 2023	7 November 2033	10 years, 254 days	Allahabad
Arun Kumar Singh Deshwal	Allahabad	27 February 2023	6 July 2035	12 years, 130 days	Allahabad
Venkatachari Lakshminarayanan	Madras	27 February 2023	3 October 2032	9 years, 220 days	Madras
Kardak Ete	Gauhati	13 March 2023	7 April 2037	14 years, 26 days	Gauhati
Susan Valentine Pinto	Gujarat	17 March 2023	13 May 2029	6 years, 58 days	Gujarat
Hasmukhbhai Dalsukhbhai Suthar	Gujarat	17 March 2023	22 January 2032	8 years, 312 days	Gujarat
Jitendra Champaklal Doshi	Gujarat	17 March 2023	29 June 2031	8 years, 105 days	Gujarat
Mangesh Rameshchandra Mengdey	Gujarat	17 March 2023	4 October 2034	11 years, 202 days	Gujarat
Divyeshkumar Amrutlal Joshi	Gujarat	17 March 2023	24 November 2036	13 years, 253 days	Gujarat
Periyasamy Vadamalai	Madras	27 March 2023	2 April 2028	5 years, 7 days	Madras
Devan Mahendrabhai Desai	Gujarat	5 April 2023	30 May 2032	9 years, 56 days	Gujarat
Moxa Kiran Thakker	Gujarat	5 April 2023	5 November 2039	16 years, 215 days	Gujarat
Harpreet Singh Brar	Punjab and Haryana	10 April 2023	19 December 2037	14 years, 254 days	Punjab and Haryana
Mridul Kumar Kalita	Gauhati	20 April 2023	1 July 2030	7 years, 73 days	Gauhati
Rakesh Thapliyal	Uttarakhand	28 April 2023	14 November 2027	4 years, 201 days	Uttarakhand
Pankaj Purohit	Uttarakhand	28 April 2023	27 July 2030	7 years, 91 days	Uttarakhand
Girish Kathpalia	Delhi	1 May 2023	31 December 2026	3 years, 245 days	Delhi
Manoj Jain	Delhi	1 May 2023	27 December 2026	3 years, 241 days	Delhi
Anuradha Shukla	Madhya Pradesh	1 May 2023	12 June 2029	6 years, 43 days	Madhya Pradesh
Sanjeev Sudhakar Kalgaonkar	Madhya Pradesh	1 May 2023	22 February 2032	8 years, 298 days	Madhya Pradesh
Sanjay Kumar Jaiswal	Chhattisgarh	1 May 2023	18 June 2027	4 years, 49 days	Chhattisgarh
Ramasamy Sakthivel	Madras	23 May 2023	20 July 2035	12 years, 59 days	Madras
P. Dhanabal	Madras	23 May 2023	4 March 2036	12 years, 287 days	Madras
Chinnasamy Kumarappan	Madras	23 May 2023	14 July 2034	11 years, 53 days	Madras
Kandasamy Rajasekar	Madras	23 May 2023	28 April 2037	13 years, 341 days	Madras
Shailesh Pramod Brahme	Bombay	15 June 2023	13 February 2033	9 years, 244 days	Bombay
Firdosh Phiroze Pooniwalla	Bombay	15 June 2023	3 March 2032	8 years, 263 days	Bombay
Jitendra Shantilal Jain	Bombay	15 June 2023	26 February 2032	8 years, 257 days	Bombay
Ranjan Sharma	Himachal Pradesh	31 July 2023	20 August 2030	7 years, 21 days	Himachal Pradesh
Bipin Chander Negi	Himachal Pradesh	31 July 2023	19 July 2030	6 years, 354 days	Himachal Pradesh
Rakesh Kainthla	Himachal Pradesh	31 July 2023	22 May 2030	6 years, 296 days	Himachal Pradesh
Laxmi Narayana Alishetty	Telangana	31 July 2023	12 May 2030	6 years, 286 days	Telangana
Anil Kumar Jukanti	Telangana	31 July 2023	27 December 2033	10 years, 150 days	Telangana
Sujana Kalasikam	Telangana	31 July 2023	9 March 2032	8 years, 223 days	Telangana
Biswadeep Bhattacharjee	Meghalaya	1 August 2023	25 March 2030	6 years, 237 days	Meghalaya
Manjusha Ajay Deshpande	Bombay	11 August 2023	26 October 2030	7 years, 77 days	Bombay
Sibo Sankar Mishra	Orissa	5 September 2023	2 May 2030	6 years, 240 days	Orissa
Budi Habung	Gauhati	12 September 2023	5 April 2031	7 years, 206 days	Gauhati
N. SenthilKumar	Madras	16 October 2023	11 October 2032	8 years, 362 days	Madras
G. Arul Murugan	Madras	16 October 2023	26 May 2038	14 years, 223 days	Madras
Vimal Kanaiyalal Vyas	Gujarat	20 October 2023	24 December 2028	5 years, 66 days	Gujarat
Ravinder Dudeja	Delhi	20 October 2023	16 May 2028	4 years, 210 days	Delhi
Ravindra Kumar Agrawal	Chhattisgarh	20 October 2023	30 July 2030	6 years, 284 days	Chhattisgarh
Harinath Nunepally	Andhra Pradesh	21 October 2023	11 January 2034	10 years, 83 days	Andhra Pradesh
Kiranmayee Mandava	Andhra Pradesh	21 October 2023	29 July 2032	8 years, 283 days	Andhra Pradesh
Sumathi Jagadam	Andhra Pradesh	21 October 2023	27 June 2033	9 years, 250 days	Andhra Pradesh
Nyapathy Vijay	Andhra Pradesh	21 October 2023	7 August 2036	12 years, 292 days	Andhra Pradesh
Abhay Jainarayanji Mantri	Bombay	21 October 2023	15 January 2031	7 years, 87 days	Bombay
Shyam Chhaganlal Chandak	Bombay	21 October 2023	9 December 2032	9 years, 50 days	Bombay
Neeraj Pradeep Dhote	Bombay	21 October 2023	27 July 2032	8 years, 281 days	Bombay
Johnson John	Kerala	25 October 2023	28 April 2027	3 years, 186 days	Kerala
Gopinathan Unnithan Girish	Kerala	25 October 2023	16 May 2029	5 years, 204 days	Kerala
Kurubarahalli Venkataramareddy Aravind	Karnataka	25 October 2023	11 July 2039	15 years, 260 days	Karnataka
Sabyasachi Datta Purkayastha	Tripura	26 October 2023	11 February 2032	8 years, 109 days	Tripura
Biswajit Palit	Tripura	26 October 2023	4 May 2031	7 years, 191 days	Tripura
Rudra Prakash Mishra	Patna	4 November 2023	14 February 2034	10 years, 103 days	Patna
Ramesh Chand Malviya	Patna	4 November 2023	30 June 2027	3 years, 239 days	Patna
Vinay Saraf	Madhya Pradesh	6 November 2023	14 June 2031	7 years, 221 days	Madhya Pradesh
Vivek Jain	Madhya Pradesh	6 November 2023	29 December 2037	14 years, 54 days	Madhya Pradesh
Rajendra Kumar Vani	Madhya Pradesh	6 November 2023	17 August 2027	3 years, 285 days	Madhya Pradesh
Devnarayan Mishra	Madhya Pradesh	6 November 2023	30 April 2029	5 years, 176 days	Madhya Pradesh
Gajendra Singh	Madhya Pradesh	6 November 2023	14 January 2028	4 years, 70 days	Madhya Pradesh
Sumeet Goel	Punjab and Haryana	6 November 2023	22 November 2034	11 years, 17 days	Punjab and Haryana
Sudeepti Sharma	Punjab and Haryana	6 November 2023	6 March 2031	7 years, 121 days	Punjab and Haryana
Kirti Singh	Punjab and Haryana	6 November 2023	29 August 2035	11 years, 297 days	Punjab and Haryana
N. Unni Krishnan Nair	Gauhati	10 November 2023	27 July 2033	9 years, 260 days	Gauhati
Kaushik Goswami	Gauhati	10 November 2023	3 September 2037	13 years, 298 days	Gauhati
Somasekhar Sundaresan	Bombay	28 November 2023	22 December 2034	11 years, 25 days	Bombay
Pranav Shailesh Trivedi	Gujarat	24 January 2024	1 November 2037	13 years, 282 days	Gujarat
Arun Kumar Rai	Jharkhand	5 February 2024	25 January 2032	7 years, 355 days	Jharkhand
Mullappally Abdul Aziz Abdul Hakhim	Kerala	22 March 2024	7 May 2031	7 years, 47 days	Kerala
Syam Kumar Vadakke Mudavakkat	Kerala	22 March 2024	31 December 2034	10 years, 285 days	Kerala
Harisankar Vijayan Menon	Kerala	22 March 2024	3 April 2036	12 years, 13 days	Kerala
Manu Sreedharan Nair	Kerala	22 March 2024	26 May 2036	12 years, 66 days	Kerala
Easwaran Subramani	Kerala	22 March 2024	29 September 2036	12 years, 192 days	Kerala
Manoj Pulamby Madhavan	Kerala	22 March 2024	3 May 2034	10 years, 43 days	Kerala
Mohd. Yousuf Wani	Jammu & Kashmir and Ladakh	25 March 2024	23 April 2028	4 years, 30 days	Jammu & Kashmir and Ladakh
Bibhu Datta Guru	Chhattisgarh	13 August 2024	6 July 2036	11 years, 329 days	Chhattisgarh
Amitendra Kishore Prasad	Chhattisgarh	13 August 2024	13 May 2031	6 years, 274 days	Chhattisgarh
R. Poornima	Madras	24 September 2024	2 July 2028	3 years, 283 days	Madras
M. Jothiraman	Madras	24 September 2024	3 June 2034	9 years, 253 days	Madras
Augustine Devadoss	Madras	24 September 2024	5 November 2027	3 years, 43 days	Madras
Shashi Bhushan Prasad Singh	Patna	4 October 2024	15 January 2027	2 years, 104 days	Patna
Ashok Kumar Pandey	Patna	4 October 2024	16 September 2028	3 years, 349 days	Patna
Sanjeev Jayendra Thaker	Gujarat	10 October 2024	26 August 2031	6 years, 321 days	Gujarat
Deeptendra Narayan Ray	Gujarat	10 October 2024	12 November 2033	9 years, 34 days	Gujarat
Maulik Jitendra Shelat	Gujarat	10 October 2024	3 June 2038	13 years, 237 days	Gujarat
Nivedita Prakash Mehta	Bombay	25 October 2024	16 February 2032	7 years, 115 days	Bombay
Prafulla Surendrakumar Khubalkar	Bombay	25 October 2024	6 December 2036	12 years, 43 days	Bombay
Ashwin Damodar Bhobe	Bombay	25 October 2024	13 February 2037	12 years, 112 days	Bombay
Rohit Wasudeo Joshi	Bombay	25 October 2024	15 August 2037	12 years, 295 days	Bombay
Advait Mahendra Sethna	Bombay	25 October 2024	10 October 2038	13 years, 351 days	Bombay
Maheswara Rao Kuncheam alias Kuncham	Andhra Pradesh	28 October 2024	11 August 2035	10 years, 288 days	Andhra Pradesh
Thoota Chandra Dhana Sekar alias TCD Sekar	Andhra Pradesh	28 October 2024	9 June 2037	12 years, 225 days	Andhra Pradesh
Challa Gunaranjan	Andhra Pradesh	28 October 2024	11 July 2038	13 years, 257 days	Andhra Pradesh
Parameswara Panicker Krishna Kumar	Kerala	30 October 2024	24 May 2037	12 years, 207 days	Kerala
Kodassery Veliyath Madom Jayakumar	Kerala	30 October 2024	20 May 2035	10 years, 203 days	Kerala
Muralee Krishna Shankaramoole	Kerala	30 October 2024	23 May 2038	13 years, 206 days	Kerala
Jobin Sebastian	Kerala	30 October 2024	26 April 2037	12 years, 179 days	Kerala
Pandikkaran Varadaraja Iyer Balakrishnan	Kerala	30 October 2024	22 March 2037	12 years, 144 days	Kerala
Ajay Digpaul	Delhi	8 January 2025	1 September 2030	5 years, 237 days	Delhi
Harish Vaidyanathan Shankar	Delhi	8 January 2025	17 February 2036	11 years, 41 days	Delhi
Avadhanam Hari Haranadha Sarma	Andhra Pradesh	24 January 2025	15 April 2030	5 years, 82 days	Andhra Pradesh
Yadavalli Lakshmana Rao	Andhra Pradesh	24 January 2025	2 August 2037	12 years, 191 days	Andhra Pradesh
Renuka Yara	Telangana	25 January 2025	13 June 2035	10 years, 140 days	Telangana
Narsing Rao Nandikonda	Telangana	25 January 2025	2 May 2031	6 years, 98 days	Telangana
Madhusudhan Rao Bobbili Ramaiah	Telangana	25 January 2025	13 May 2031	6 years, 125 days	Telangana
Praveen Kumar Giri	Allahabad	27 January 2025	19 January 2037	11 years, 359 days	Allahabad
Chandra Shekhar Sharma	Rajasthan	27 January 2025	2 July 2029	4 years, 157 days	Rajasthan
Pramil Kumar Mathur	Rajasthan	27 January 2025	2 February 2028	3 years, 7 days	Rajasthan
Chandra Prakash Shrimali	Rajasthan	27 January 2025	1 August 2027	2 years, 187 days	Rajasthan
Pravin Sheshrao Patil	Bombay	27 January 2025	27 February 2035	10 years, 126 days	Bombay
Alok Mahra	Uttarakhand	14 February 2025	31 January 2034	8 years, 352 days	Uttarakhand
Tejas Dhirenbhai Karia	Delhi	14 February 2025	31 January 2040	14 years, 352 days	Delhi
Chaitali Chatterjee (Das)	Calcutta	14 February 2025			Calcutta
Harmeet Singh Grewal	Punjab and Haryana	17 February 2025	31 October 2031	6 years, 257 days	Punjab and Haryana
Deepinder Singh Nalwa	Punjab and Haryana	17 February 2025	7 June 2032	7 years, 112 days	Punjab and Haryana
Taj Ali Moulasab Nadaf	Karnataka	17 February 2025			Karnataka
Ashish Shroti	Madhya Pradesh	17 February 2025	15 November 2038	13 years, 272 days	Madhya Pradesh
Yarenjungla Longkumer	Gauhati	17 February 2025			Gauhati
Maneesh Sharma	Rajasthan	17 February 2025	5 February 2033	7 years, 355 days	Rajasthan
Renu Bhatnagar	Delhi	21 February 2025	26 August 2029	4 years, 187 days	Delhi
Rajneesh Kumar Gupta	Delhi	21 February 2025	20 May 2028	3 years, 90 days	Delhi
Alok Kumar Sinha	Patna	8 March 2025	7 September 2032	7 years, 184 days	Patna
Sourendra Pandey	Patna	8 March 2025	10 December 2032	7 years, 278 days	Patna
Soni Shrivastava	Patna	8 March 2025	11 August 2036	11 years, 157 days	Patna
Smita Das De	Calcutta	11 March 2025			Calcutta
Reetobroto Kumar Mitra	Calcutta	11 March 2025			Calcutta
Om Narayan Rai	Calcutta	11 March 2025			Calcutta
Anand Sharma	Rajasthan	28 March 2025	3 August 2033	8 years, 129 days	Rajasthan
Sunil Beniwal	Rajasthan	28 March 2025	31 May 2036	11 years, 65 days	Rajasthan
Mukesh Rajpurohit	Rajasthan	28 March 2025	14 May 2036	11 years, 48 days	Rajasthan
Sandeep Shah	Rajasthan	28 March 2025	14 August 2038	13 years, 140 days	Rajasthan
Jitendra Kumar sinha	Allahabad	18 April 2025	27 May 2031	6 years, 40 days	Allahabad
Anil Kumar-X	Allahabad	18 April 2025	20 April 2033	8 years, 3 days	Allahabad
Sandeep Jain	Allahabad	18 April 2025	28 November 2027	2 years, 225 days	Allahabad
Avnish Saxena	Allahabad	18 April 2025	7 February 2033	7 years, 296 days	Allahabad
Madan Pal Singh	Allahabad	18 April 2025	1 January 2033	7 years, 259 days	Allahabad
Harvir Singh	Allahabad	18 April 2025	12 March 2029	3 years, 329 days	Allahabad
Sanjay Parihar	Jammu & Kashmir and Ladakh	1 May 2025	18 December 2030	5 years, 232 days	Jammu & Kashmir and Ladakh
Shahzad Azeem	Jammu & Kashmir and Ladakh	1 May 2025	26 April 2037	11 years, 361 days	Jammu & Kashmir and Ladakh
Liyakathussain Shamsuddin Pirzada	Gujarat	5 May 2025	24 April 2030	4 years, 355 days	Gujarat
Ramchandra Thakurdas Vachhani	Gujarat	5 May 2025	11 March 2035	9 years, 311 days	Gujarat
Jayesh Lakhanshibhai Odedra	Gujarat	5 May 2025	24 April 2035	9 years, 355 days	Gujarat
Pranav Maheshbhai Raval	Gujarat	5 May 2025	23 October 2031	6 years, 172 days	Gujarat
Mool Chand Tyagi	Gujarat	5 May 2025	14 October 2032	7 years, 163 days	Gujarat
Utkarsh Thakorbhai Desai	Gujarat	5 May 2025	26 January 2031	5 years, 267 days	Gujarat
Shamima Jahan	Gauhati	28 May 2025			Gauhati
Rohit Kapoor	Punjab and Haryana	28 May 2025	30 September 2037	12 years, 126 days	Punjab and Haryana
Deepak Khot	Madhya Pradesh	30 May 2025	7 March 2037	11 years, 282 days	Madhya Pradesh
Amit Seth	Madhya Pradesh	30 May 2025	14 March 2037	11 years, 289 days	Madhya Pradesh
Pavan Kumar Dwivedi	Madhya Pradesh	30 May 2025	23 July 2036	11 years, 55 days	Madhya Pradesh
Subhash Upadhyaya	Uttarakhand	30 May 2025	11 December 2034	9 years, 196 days	Uttarakhand
Sachin Shivajirao Deshmukh	Bombay	9 June 2025			Bombay
Gautam Ashwin Ankhad	Bombay	4 July 2025			Bombay
Mahendra Madhavrao Nerlikar	Bombay	4 July 2025			Bombay
Sandeep Taneja	Rajasthan	23 July 2025	2 January 2037	11 years, 164 days	Rajasthan
Baljinder Singh Sandhu	Rajasthan	23 July 2025			Rajasthan
Bipin Gupta	Rajasthan	23 July 2025			Rajasthan
Sanjeet Purohit	Rajasthan	23 July 2025			Rajasthan
Ravi Chirania	Rajasthan	23 July 2025			Rajasthan
Anuroop Singhi	Rajasthan	23 July 2025			Rajasthan
Sangeeta Sharma	Rajasthan	23 July 2025			Rajasthan
Vinod Kumar	Delhi	24 July 2025	29 December 2027	2 years, 159 days	Delhi
Shail Jain	Delhi	24 July 2025	6 October 2028	3 years, 75 days	Delhi
Madhu Jain	Delhi	24 July 2025	17 November 2028	3 years, 117 days	Delhi
Anjan Moni Kalita	Gauhati	30 July 2025			Gauhati
Rajesh Majumdar	Gauhati	30 July 2025			Gauhati
Pranjal Das	Gauhati	30 July 2025			Gauhati
Sanjeev Kumar Sharma	Gauhati	30 July 2025			Gauhati
Pushpendra Yadav	Madhya Pradesh	30 July 2025	26 February 2039	13 years, 212 days	Madhya Pradesh
Anand Singh Bahrawat	Madhya Pradesh	30 July 2025	25 July 2040	14 years, 362 days	Madhya Pradesh
Ajay Kumar Nirankari	Madhya Pradesh	30 July 2025	4 October 2037	12 years, 67 days	Madhya Pradesh
Jay Kumar Pillai	Madhya Pradesh	30 July 2025	3 August 2033	8 years, 5 days	Madhya Pradesh
Himanshu Joshi	Madhya Pradesh	30 July 2025	3 April 2041	15 years, 248 days	Madhya Pradesh
Ramkumar Choubey	Madhya Pradesh	30 July 2025	30 June 2028	2 years, 337 days	Madhya Pradesh
Rajesh Kumar Gupta	Madhya Pradesh	30 July 2025	14 August 2027	2 years, 16 days	Madhya Pradesh
Alok Awasthi	Madhya Pradesh	30 July 2025			Madhya Pradesh
Ratnesh Chandra Singh Bisen	Madhya Pradesh	30 July 2025			Madhya Pradesh
Bhagwati Prasad Sharma	Madhya Pradesh	30 July 2025			Madhya Pradesh
Gouse Meera Mohiuddin	Telangana	31 July 2025			Telangana
Chalapathi Rao Suddala	Telangana	31 July 2025			Telangana
Vakiti Ramakrishna Reddy	Telangana	31 July 2025			Telangana
Gadi Praveen Kumar	Telangana	31 July 2025			Telangana
Virinder Aggarwal	Punjab and Haryana	4 August 2025			Punjab and Haryana
Mandeep Pannu	Punjab and Haryana	4 August 2025			Punjab and Haryana
Amarinder Singh Grewal	Punjab and Haryana	4 August 2025			Punjab and Haryana
Parmod Goyal	Punjab and Haryana	4 August 2025			Punjab and Haryana
Rupinderjit Chahal	Punjab and Haryana	4 August 2025			Punjab and Haryana
Shalini Singh Nagpal	Punjab and Haryana	4 August 2025			Punjab and Haryana
Subhas Mehla	Punjab and Haryana	4 August 2025			Punjab and Haryana
Surya Partap Singh	Punjab and Haryana	4 August 2025			Punjab and Haryana
Aaradhna Sawhney	Punjab and Haryana	4 August 2025			Punjab and Haryana
Yashvir Singh Rathor	Punjab and Haryana	4 August 2025			Punjab and Haryana
Tuhin Kumar Gedela	Andhra Pradesh	4 August 2025			Andhra Pradesh
Ajit Kumar	Patna	4 August 2025	21 November 2036	11 years, 110 days	Patna
Pramod Kumar Srivastava	Allahabad	7 August 2025	4 January 2027	1 year, 151 days	Allahabad
Abdul Shahid	Allahabad	7 August 2025	5 July 2030	4 years, 333 days	Allahabad
Santosh Rai	Allahabad	7 August 2025	30 June 2034	8 years, 328 days	Allahabad
Tej Pratap Tiwari	Allahabad	7 August 2025	1 August 2033	7 years, 360 days	Allahabad
Zafeer Ahmad	Allahabad	7 August 2025	29 January 2032	6 years, 176 days	Allahabad
Pradeep Mittal	Madhya Pradesh	11 August 2025			Madhya Pradesh
Vimal Kumar Yadav	Delhi	12 August 2025	8 January 2027	1 year, 150 days	Delhi
Ajit Bhagwanrao Kadethankar	Bombay	19 August 2025			Bombay
Sushil Manohar Ghodeswar	Bombay	19 August 2025			Bombay
Aarti Arun Sathe	Bombay	19 August 2025			Bombay
Ramesh Kumari	Punjab and Haryana	20 August 2025			Punjab and Haryana
Siddheshwar Sundarrao Thombre	Bombay	2 September 2025			Bombay
Mehroz Ashraf Khan Pathan	Bombay	2 September 2025			Bombay
Ranjitsinha Raja Bhonsale	Bombay	2 September 2025			Bombay
Nandesh Shankarrao Deshpande	Bombay	2 September 2025			Bombay
Amit Satyavan Jamsandekar	Bombay	2 September 2025			Bombay
Ashish Sahadev Chavan	Bombay	2 September 2025			Bombay
Sandesh Dadasaheb Patil	Bombay	2 September 2025			Bombay
Vaishali Nimbajirao Patil-Jadhav	Bombay	2 September 2025			Bombay
Abasaheb Dharmaji Shinde	Bombay	2 September 2025			Bombay
Shreeram Vinayak Shirsat	Bombay	2 September 2025			Bombay
Hiten Shamrao Venegavkar	Bombay	2 September 2025			Bombay
Farhan Parvez Dubash	Bombay	2 September 2025			Bombay
Rajnish Ratnakar Vyas	Bombay	2 September 2025			Bombay
Raj Damodar Wakode	Bombay	2 September 2025			Bombay
Arun Kumar	Allahabad	3 September 2025	2 April 2034	8 years, 212 days	Allahabad
Amitabh Kumar Rai	Allahabad	8 September 2025	3 June 2031	5 years, 269 days	Allahabad
Rajiv Lochan Shukla	Allahabad	8 September 2025	2 August 2040	14 years, 330 days	Allahabad
Vivek Saran	Allahabad	27 September 2025	30 October 2032	7 years, 34 days	Allahabad
Vivek Kumar Singh	Allahabad	27 September 2025	7 October 2037	12 years, 11 days	Allahabad
Garima Prashad	Allahabad	27 September 2025	22 October 2036	11 years, 26 days	Allahabad
Sudhanshu Chauhan	Allahabad	27 September 2025	9 July 2035	9 years, 286 days	Allahabad
Abdhesh Kumar Chaudhary	Allahabad	27 September 2025	19 December 2035	10 years, 84 days	Allahabad
Swarupama Chaturvedi	Allahabad	27 September 2025	31 December 2039	14 years, 96 days	Allahabad
Siddharth Nandan	Allahabad	27 September 2025	25 May 2040	14 years, 242 days	Allahabad
Kunal Ravi Singh	Allahabad	27 September 2025	10 June 2041	15 years, 257 days	Allahabad
Indrajeet Shukla	Allahabad	27 September 2025	30 June 2040	14 years, 278 days	Allahabad
Satya Veer Singh	Allahabad	27 September 2025	6 July 2039	13 years, 283 days	Allahabad
Ajay Kumar-II	Allahabad	27 September 2025	5 June 2034	8 years, 252 days	Allahabad
Chawan Prakash	Allahabad	27 September 2025	4 July 2033	7 years, 281 days	Allahabad
Divesh Chandra Samant	Allahabad	27 September 2025	4 February 2028	2 years, 131 days	Allahabad
Prashant Mishra-I	Allahabad	27 September 2025	24 December 2034	9 years, 89 days	Allahabad
Tarun Saxena	Allahabad	27 September 2025	10 January 2034	8 years, 106 days	Allahabad
Rajeev Bharti	Allahabad	27 September 2025	20 January 2033	7 years, 116 days	Allahabad
Padam Narayan Mishra	Allahabad	27 September 2025	2 October 2032	7 years, 6 days	Allahabad
Lakshmi Kant Shukla	Allahabad	27 September 2025	1 July 2034	8 years, 278 days	Allahabad
Jai Prakash Tiwari	Allahabad	27 September 2025	1 January 2034	8 years, 97 days	Allahabad
Devendra Singh-I	Allahabad	27 September 2025	13 November 2030	5 years, 48 days	Allahabad
Sanjiv Kumar	Allahabad	27 September 2025	7 February 2028	2 years, 134 days	Allahabad
Vani Ranjan Agrawal	Allahabad	27 September 2025	20 September 2027	1 year, 359 days	Allahabad
Achal Sachdev	Allahabad	27 September 2025	30 December 2031	6 years, 95 days	Allahabad
Babita Rani	Allahabad	27 September 2025	23 April 2035	9 years, 209 days	Allahabad
Geetha Kadaba Bharatharaja Setty	Karnataka	30 September 2025			Karnataka
Borkatte Muralidhara Pai	Karnataka	30 September 2025			Karnataka
Tyagaraja Narayan Inavally	Karnataka	30 September 2025			Karnataka
Jiya Lal Bhardwaj	Himachal Pradesh	6 October 2025	19 August 2031	5 years, 318 days	Himachal Pradesh
Romesh Verma	Himachal Pradesh	6 October 2025	6 May 2036	10 years, 214 days	Himachal Pradesh
Vinai Kumar Dwivedi	Allahabad	17 October 2025	31 October 2028	3 years, 15 days	Allahabad
Jai Krishna Upadhyay	Allahabad	7 January 2026	13 August 2034	8 years, 219 days	Allahabad
Ramesh Chander Dimri	Punjab and Haryana	8 January 2026			Punjab and Haryana
Neerja Kulwant Kalson	Punjab and Haryana	8 January 2026			Punjab and Haryana
Ritesh Kumar	Patna	8 January 2026	1 July 2033	7 years, 175 days	Patna
Praveen Kumar	Patna	8 January 2026	20 October 2039	13 years, 286 days	Patna
Siddhartha Sah	Uttarakhand	8 January 2026			Uttarakhand
Ansul	Patna	27 January 2026	11 July 2033	7 years, 166 days	Patna
Balaji Medamalli	Andhra Pradesh	12 February 2026			Andhra Pradesh
Preeta Arvindan Krishnamma	Kerala	27 April 2026			Kerala
Rajeshwari Narayana Hegde	Karnataka	1 June 2026			Karnataka
Kedambadi Ganesh Shanthi	Karnataka	1 June 2026			Karnataka
Mahadevappa Brungesh	Karnataka	1 June 2026			Karnataka
Ranjan Kumar Jha	Patna	15 June 2026	14 November 2033	7 years, 153 days	Patna
Kumar Manish	Patna	15 June 2026	22 May 2034	7 years, 342 days	Patna
Raj Kumar	Patna	15 June 2026	24 March 2033	6 years, 283 days	Patna
Rana Vikram Singh	Patna	15 June 2026			Patna
Vikash Kumar	Patna	15 June 2026			Patna
Girijish Kumar	Patna	15 June 2026			Patna
Alok Kumar	Patna	15 June 2026			Patna
Sunitha Gandham	Andhra Pradesh	6 July 2026			Andhra Pradesh
Alapati Giridhar	Andhra Pradesh	6 July 2026			Andhra Pradesh
Purushottam Kumaar Chintalapudi	Andhra Pradesh	6 July 2026			Andhra Pradesh
Aryak Dutt	Calcutta	8 August 2026			Calcutta
Atarup Banerjee	Calcutta	8 August 2026			Calcutta
Sandip Kumar De	Calcutta	8 August 2026			Calcutta
Partha Pratim Roy	Calcutta	8 August 2026			Calcutta
Sudip Deb	Calcutta	8 August 2026			Calcutta
Anuj Singh	Calcutta	8 August 2026			Calcutta
Arjun Ray Mukherjee	Calcutta	8 August 2026			Calcutta
Rishad Medora	Calcutta	8 August 2026			Calcutta
Raghavendra Seetharam Srivatsa	Karnataka	9 August 2026			Karnataka
Hema Kulkarni	Karnataka	9 August 2026			Karnataka
Subramanya Rangarao	Karnataka	9 August 2026			Karnataka
Thadagavadi Prakash Vivekananda	Karnataka	9 August 2026			Karnataka
Bakkeswara Pramod	Karnataka	9 August 2026			Karnataka
Hombe Gowda Shanthi Bhushan	Karnataka	9 August 2026			Karnataka
Krishnaswamy Govindarajan	Madras	9 August 2026	7 March 2034	7 years, 211 days	Madras
Rajnish Pathiyil	Madras	9 August 2026	27 February 2035	8 years, 203 days	Madras
Natarajan Ramesh	Madras	9 August 2026	3 March 2035	8 years, 207 days	Madras
G. K. Muthukumaar	Madras	9 August 2026	9 October 2036	10 years, 62 days	Madras
Ramakrishnan Rajesh Vivekananthan	Madras	9 August 2026	2 January 2037	10 years, 147 days	Madras
Sankaranarayanan Raveekumar	Madras	9 August 2026			Madras
Nagarajan Dilip Kumar	Madras	9 August 2026			Madras
Ellappan Manoharan	Madras	9 August 2026			Madras
Dr. P. Murugan	Madras	9 August 2026			Madras
M. D. Sumathi	Madras	9 August 2026			Madras
S. Alli	Madras	9 August 2026			Madras
Thirumagal Chandrasekar	Madras	9 August 2026			Madras
Shanmugam Karthikeyan	Madras	9 August 2026			Madras
Baluchamy Murugesan	Madras	9 August 2026			Madras
N. Gunasekaran	Madras	9 August 2026			Madras
Amit Lahoti	Madhya Pradesh	10 August 2026			Madhya Pradesh
Monica Chhibber Sharma	Punjab and Haryana	21 August 2026			Punjab and Haryana
Harmeet Singh Deol	Punjab and Haryana	21 August 2026			Punjab and Haryana
Pravindra Singh Chauhan	Punjab and Haryana	21 August 2026			Punjab and Haryana
Rajesh Gaur	Punjab and Haryana	21 August 2026			Punjab and Haryana
Puja Chopra	Punjab and Haryana	21 August 2026			Punjab and Haryana
Sunish Bindlish	Punjab and Haryana	21 August 2026			Punjab and Haryana
Minderjeet Yadav	Punjab and Haryana	21 August 2026			Punjab and Haryana
Divya Sharma	Punjab and Haryana	21 August 2026			Punjab and Haryana
Ravinder Malik	Punjab and Haryana	21 August 2026			Punjab and Haryana
Chirag Bhanu Singh	Himachal Pradesh	30 August 2026	17 December 2032	6 years, 110 days	Himachal Pradesh
Bhupesh Sharma	Himachal Pradesh	30 August 2026			Himachal Pradesh
Yogesh Jaswal	Himachal Pradesh	30 August 2026			Himachal Pradesh
Nchumbemo Mozhui	Gauhati	10 September 2026			Gauhati
Helen Dawngliani	Gauhati	10 September 2026			Gauhati
Santosh Sharma	Chhattisgarh	10 September 2026	1 July 2030	3 years, 295 days	Chhattisgarh
Sushma Sawant	Chhattisgarh	10 September 2026	23 November 2031	5 years, 75 days	Chhattisgarh
Sudhir Kumar	Chhattisgarh	10 September 2026	14 July 2033	6 years, 308 days	Chhattisgarh
Nivedita Anil sharma	Delhi	21 September 2026	13 April 2028	1 year, 206 days	Delhi
Nisha Sahay Saxena	Delhi	21 September 2026	14 August 2030	3 years, 328 days	Delhi
Sanjay Sharma	Delhi	21 September 2026			Delhi
Bharat Parashar	Delhi	21 September 2026			Delhi
Aditi Choudhary	Delhi	21 September 2026			Delhi
Dinesh Bhatt	Delhi	21 September 2026			Delhi
Arun Bhardwaj	Delhi	21 September 2026			Delhi
Yash Paul Bourney	Jammu & Kashmir and Ladakh	22 September 2026	24 August 2029	2 years, 337 days	Jammu & Kashmir and Ladakh
Manoj Prasad	Jharkhand	23 September 2026	15 November 2035	9 years, 54 days	Jharkhand
Akhil Kumar	Jharkhand	23 September 2026	5 January 2034	7 years, 105 days	Jharkhand
Ram Sharma	Jharkhand	23 September 2026	6 July 2030	3 years, 287 days	Jharkhand
Usharani	Karnataka	25 September 2026			Karnataka
Kuruba Shanthappa Bharath Kumar	Karnataka	25 September 2026			Karnataka
Nerale Veerabhadraiah Bhavani	Karnataka	25 September 2026			Karnataka
Gurvinder Pal Singh	Delhi	7 October 2026			Delhi
Dharmalingam Lingeswaran	Madras	15 October 2026			Madras
Balathandayutham Karthikeyan	Madras	15 October 2026			Madras
Ajay Sharma	Bombay	18 November 2026			Bombay

== See also ==
- List of sitting judges of the Supreme Court of India
- List of current Indian chief justices
- List of female chief justices in India
- List of former chief justices of the high courts of India
