= R Sudhakar =

Former Chief Justice of Manipur High Court (2018-2021)

Hon'ble Chief Justice (Retd.) Ramalingam Sudhakar
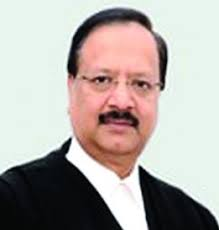

President of National Company Law Tribunal
- In office 1 November 2021 – 13 February 2026
- Appointed by: Ram Nath Kovind
- Preceded by: Mahesh Mittal Kumar
- Succeeded by: Anupinder Singh Grewal

5th Chief Justice of Manipur High Court
- In office 18 May 2018 – 13 February 2021
- Nominated by: Dipak Misra
- Appointed by: Ram Nath Kovind
- Preceded by: Abhilasha Kumari; N. K. Singh (acting)
- Succeeded by: P. V. Sanjay Kumar

Judge of Jammu and Kashmir High Court
- In office 18 April 2016 – 17 May 2018
- Nominated by: T. S. Thakur
- Appointed by: Pranab Mukherjee
- Acting Chief Justice
- In office 16 March 2018 – 11 May 2018
- Appointed by: Ramnath Kovind
- Preceded by: Badar Durrez Ahmed
- Succeeded by: Gita Mittal; Alok Aradhe (acting)
- In office 15 March 2017 – 31 March 2017
- Appointed by: Pranab Mukherjee
- Preceded by: N. Paul Vasanthakumar
- Succeeded by: Badar Durrez Ahmed

Judge of Madras High Court
- In office 10 December 2005 – 17 April 2016
- Nominated by: Yogesh Kumar Sabharwal
- Appointed by: A. P. J. Abdul Kalam

Personal details
- Born: 14 February 1959 (age 67) Vellore, Tamilnadu
- Education: Loyola College, Chennai Madras Law College; Madras University

Ramalingam Sudhakar (born 14 February 1959) is a retired Indian judge who served as 5th Chief Justice of Manipur High Court from 2018 to 2021. He is also former Acting Chief Justice of Jammu and Kashmir High Court and judge of Jammu and Kashmir High Court and Madras High Court. He served as president of National Company Law Tribunal from 2021 to 2026.

== Life and education ==
He was born on 14 February 1959 and hails from Panapakkam, Vellore District in Tamil Nadu.

Sudhakar had his early schooling done in Don Bosco Matriculation School, Egmore, Chennai. He graduated from St. Mary’s Higher Secondary School, Madurai, completing his school education. He graduated from Loyola College, Chennai with a college degree. He was conferred a Degree in Law from Madras Law College.

== Career ==
Sudhakar enrolled as an advocate and started practice as an associate of the senior advocate Habibullah Badsha, former Advocate General of Tamil Nadu and Public Prosecutor of Madras High Court.

Sudhakar practised in all branches of law and specialized in the field of Customs, Central Excise and Sales Tax Law. Besides Madras High Court, he also practiced, appeared in cases before the High Court of Andhra Pradesh, Karnataka High Court and Kerala High Court. He regularly appeared in matters before the Supreme Court of India as well.

== Judgeship ==
Sudhakar was elevated to the Bench as an Additional Judge of the High Court of Madras on 10 December 2005 and as a Permanent Judge on 20 April 2007. On 18 April 2016, he was appointed a judge of the Jammu and Kashmir High Court. He was the Acting Chief Justice of Jammu and Kashmir High Court, from 15 March 2017 to 31 March 2017, after the retirement of former Chief Justice N. Paul Vasanthakumar, until the appointment of the current Chief Justice, Badar Durrez Ahmed. He once again assumed the role of Acting Chief Justice after the retirement of Justice Badar Durrez Ahmed, on 16 March 2018. He was overlooked and V. Ramasubramanian was chosen over him as a Supreme Court judge.

He was elevated as Chief Justice of Manipur High Court on 18 May 2018.

He retired on 13 February 2021.

He was appointed President of National Company Law Tribunal on 1 November 2021 and served until 13 February 2026.

== Family legacy ==
His father, S. T. Ramalingam served as a Judge of the Madras High Court. S. P. Sri Ram, his maternal grandfather, served as a District Judge and retired as Chairman of the Sales Tax Appellate Tribunal. He hails from a family actively involved in the Indian independence movement. His maternal great-grandfather S. P. Ayyaswamy Mudaliar, a well known Civil Engineer in the early twentieth century, was an active freedom fighter. During the years of 1939 and 1940 the family hosted several national leaders and freedom fighters at their house.
