= Abhilasha Kumari =

Former judicial member of Lokpal of India

Honourable Justice Abhilasha Kumari
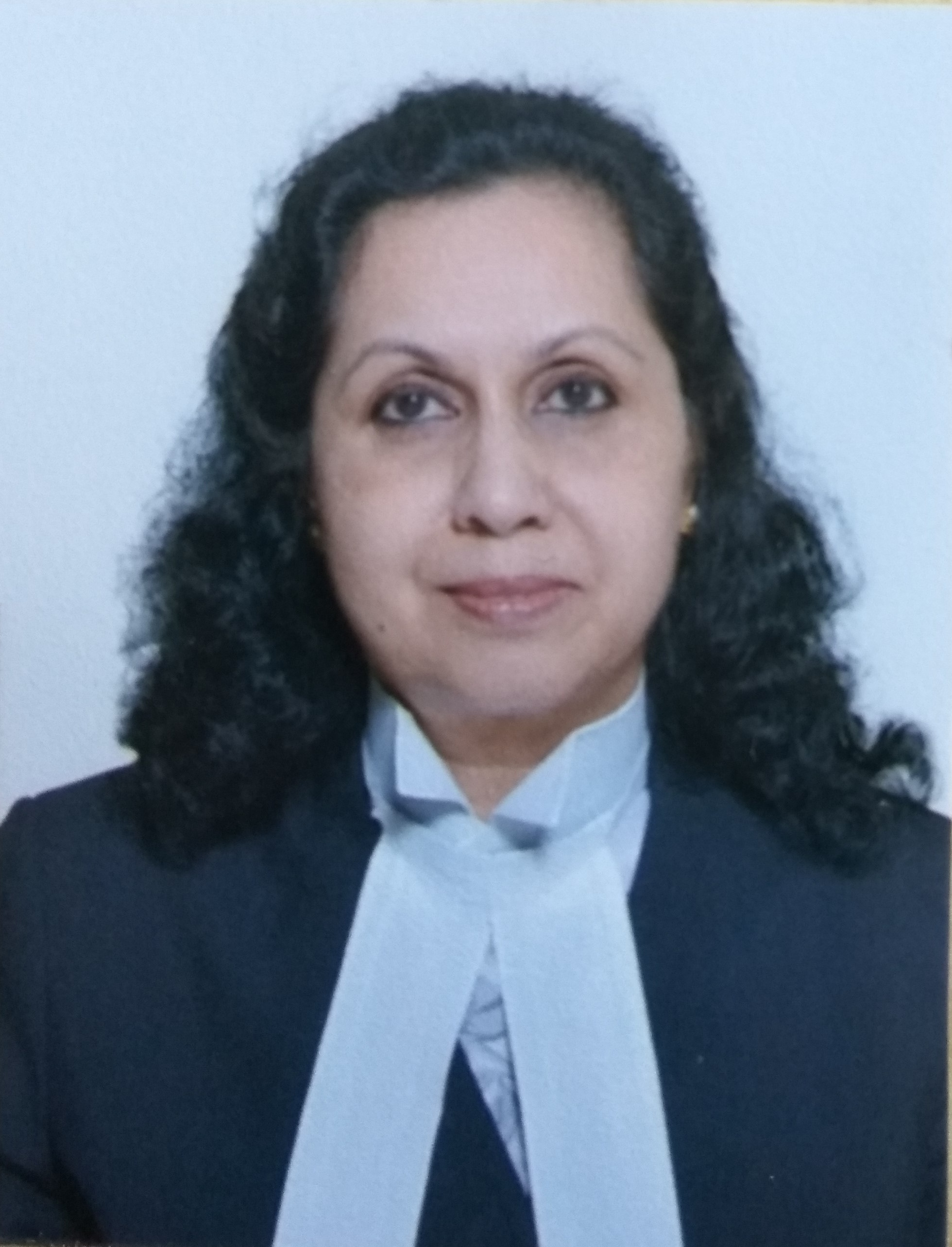

Judicial Member of Lokpal
- In office 27 March 2019 – 26 March 2024
- Appointed by: Ram Nath Kovind
- Chairman: Pinaki Chandra Ghose

Chairperson of Gujarat Human Rights Commission
- In office 17 May 2018 – 23 March 2019
- Appointed by: Om Prakash Kohli

4th Chief Justice of Manipur High Court
- In office 9 February 2018 – 22 February 2018
- Nominated by: Dipak Misra
- Appointed by: Ram Nath Kovind
- Preceded by: R. R. Prasad; N. K. Singh (acting)
- Succeeded by: R. Sudhakar; N. K. Singh (acting)

Judge of Gujarat High Court
- In office 9 January 2006 – 8 February 2018
- Nominated by: Y. K. Sabharwal
- Appointed by: A.P.J. Abdul Kalam

Judge of Himachal Pradesh High Court
- In office 2 December 2005 – 8 January 2006
- Nominated by: Y. K. Sabharwal
- Appointed by: A.P.J. Abdul Kalam

Personal details
- Born: 23 February 1956 (age 70)
- Spouse: Prithvindrasinh Gohil (m. 1979)
- Parent: Virbhadra Singh (father)
- Education: Indraprastha College for Women, University of Delhi (B.A.); Faculty of Law, Himachal Pradesh University (LL.B)

Abhilasha Kumari (born 23 February 1956) served as Judicial Member of Lokpal of India from 23 March 2019 to 26 March 2024. She is a former judge who served on the High Court of Gujarat from 2006 to 2018, and as the first female Chief Justice on the Manipur High Court in 2018. She was the chairperson of the Human Rights Commission of the Gujarat state of India from 17 May 2018 to 23 March 2019.

== Early life ==
Abhilasha Kumari was born on 23 February 1956 to Virbhadra Singh, the former Chief Minister of Himachal Pradesh, and his first wife, Ratan Kumari. She is the eldest of four sisters and a brother. She completed her early education at the Loreto Convent, Tara Hall, Shimla, after which she completed a B.A. in English from the Indraprastha College, University of Delhi and a LL.B. from the Faculty of Law, Himachal Pradesh University.

== Career ==
Kumari started her career as an advocate on 26 March 1984 and practised in the Himachal Pradesh High Court and the Himachal Pradesh Administrative Tribunal. She was the Additional Central Government Standing Counsel from 1995 to 2002 and as the additional advocate general of Himachal Pradesh in March 2003 to December 2005.

She worked as the Legal Advisor-cum-Standing Counsel for Himachal Pradesh Krishi Vishvavidyalaya, Himachal Pradesh University, Himachal Pradesh Scheduled Castes and Scheduled Tribes Development Corporation and Himachal Pradesh State Electricity Board. She also served as the Standing Counsel for Municipal Council, Dalhousie; Standing Counsel for Simla Municipal Corporation; Himachal Pradesh Board of School Education and Himachal Pradesh Technical Education Board.

She served as judge on the Gujarat High Court from 9 January 2006 to 7 February 2018. She then became the first female Chief Justice of Manipur High Court for only thirteen days from 9 to 22 February 2018, when she retired. She has been a Chairperson of the Gujarat State Human Rights Commission of India since 17 May 2018.

She was appointed Judicial member of Lokpal of India on 23 March 2019 along with 3 other Judicial members and served until 26 March 2024.
