= Atul Sreedharan =

Indian judge (born 1966)

The Honourable Justice Atul Sreedharan

Judge of Allahabad High Court
- Incumbent
- Assumed office 11 November 2025
- Nominated by: B. R. Gavai
- Appointed by: Droupadi Murmu

Judge of Madhya Pradesh High Court
- In office 21 March 2025 – 10 November 2025
- Nominated by: Sanjiv Khanna
- Appointed by: Droupadi Murmu
- In office 7 April 2016 – 9 May 2023
- Nominated by: T. S. Thakur
- Appointed by: Pranab Mukherjee

Judge of Jammu and Kashmir and Ladakh High Court
- In office 10 May 2023 – 20 March 2025
- Nominated by: D. Y. Chandrachud
- Appointed by: Droupadi Murmu

Personal details
- Born: 24 May 1966 (age 60)

Atul Sreedharan (born 24 May 1966) is an Indian judge currently serving in Allahabad High Court since November 2025. He also served in the Madhya Pradesh High Court and Jammu and Kashmir and Ladakh High Court.

== Early life and career ==
Sreedharan was born on 24 May 1966. He was a member of the chamber of Senior Advocate Gopal Subramaniam in Delhi from 1992 to 1997. From 1997 to December 2000, he practised independently in Delhi. In 2001, he practised in the Indore bench of the Madhya Pradesh High Court. He also served on the panel of Madhya Pradesh Housing Board between 2002 and 2012.

He was appointed as an Additional Judge of the Madhya Pradesh High Court on 7 April 2016 and was confirmed as a Permanent Judge on 17 March 2018. Sreedharan was transferred as a judge of Jammu and Kashmir and Ladakh High Court in April 2023 on his request, due to his daughter practising law at the Madhya Pradesh High Court. He was repatriated to Madhya Pradesh High Court in March 2025. He was transferred as Judge of Allahabad High Court and took oath of office on 11 November 2025.

He was superseded by justice S. A. Dharmadhikari, junior to him, for elevation to the post of chief justice of high court when supreme court collegium recommended elevation dharmadhikari as chief justice of Madras High Court in February 2026.

== Transfer and controversy ==
Supreme Court Collegium in August 2025 recommended his transfer to Chhattisgarh High Court where he would have been at seniority number 3 and would form part of high court collegium but this recommendation was modified on the request of central government and he was subsequently transferred to Allahabad High Court where he would be at seniority rank 7 far below from being eligible to be part of collegium.

This acceptance of executive interference in judicial transfer was widely perceived as threat to judicial independence by several former jurists and senior lawyers. His frequent transfers (third in one year) is considered as form of punishment for his independence by activists as he was repatriated to Madhya Pradesh High Court from Jammu & Kashmir High Court just days before when he was to be appointed as Acting Chief Justice of Jammu & Kashmir High Court on the retirement of the then chief justice Tashi Rabstan in April 2025.

His transfer has raised concerns about the judicial independence and the fate of judges who dare to be independent in tense political atmosphere where politics could affect the career prospects of judges as happened in the case of Justice Sreedharan.

He was transferred to Madhya Pradesh High Court 26 days before he was set to become Chief Justice of Jammu and Kashmir High Court.

In September 2026, he quashed a highly publicized National Security Act (NSA) detention against a student, ordering the state to pay ₹5 Lakh in compensation directly out of the erring District Magistrate's salary, calling the arbitrary use of state machinery an "Orwellian dystopia".

In his transfer case, in a first, collegium publicly acknowledged that it revisited and changed its decision at the Government's request.

Highlighting relation between the High Court judges and judges of the district judiciary, he likened the relationship to that of a feudal lord and a serf.

Fifty years later we see in Justice Atul Sreedharan of the Allahabad high court a reflection of Justice H R Khanna
