= Vinod Kumar Gupta =

Indian judge (1947–2025)

Hon'ble Chief Justice (Retd.) Vinod Kumar Gupta
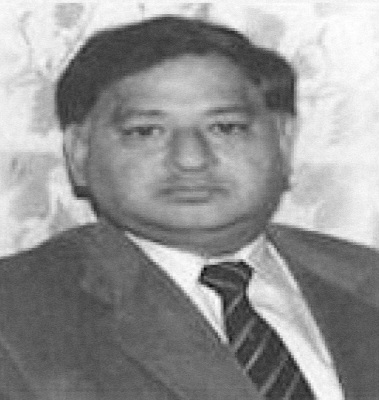

6th Chief Justice of Uttarakhand High Court
- In office 2 February 2008 – 9 September 2009
- Nominated by: K. G. Balakrishnan
- Appointed by: Pratibha Patil
- Preceded by: Rajiv Gupta
- Succeeded by: J. S. Khehar; Tarun Agarwala (acting); B. C. Kandapal (acting)

18th Chief Justice of Himachal Pradesh High Court
- In office 8 March 2003 – 1 February 2008
- Nominated by: V. N. Khare
- Appointed by: A. P. J. Abdul Kalam
- Preceded by: W. A. Shishak; Kamlesh Sharma (acting)
- Succeeded by: Jagadish Bhalla

1st Chief Justice of Jharkhand High Court
- In office 5 December 2000 – 4 March 2003; Acting CJ : 15 November 2000 - 4 December 2000
- Nominated by: A. S. Anand
- Appointed by: K. R. Narayanan
- Preceded by: Position established
- Succeeded by: P. K. Balasubramanyan

Judge of Patna High Court
- In office 9 November 2000 – 14 November 2000
- Nominated by: A. S. Anand
- Appointed by: K. R. Narayanan

Judge of Calcutta High Court
- In office 6 May 1996 – 8 November 2000
- Nominated by: A. M. Ahmadi
- Appointed by: S. D. Sharma

Judge of Jammu & Kashmir High Court
- In office 7 November 1990 – 5 May 1996
- Nominated by: Ranganath Misra
- Appointed by: R. Venkataraman

Advocate General of Jammu and Kashmir
- In office April 1990 – November 1990
- Appointed by: Jagmohan Malhotra
- Preceded by: Altaf Ahmad
- Succeeded by: Permod Kohli

Personal details
- Born: 10 September 1947
- Died: 15 February 2025 (aged 77) New Delhi
- Education: L. L. B.
- Alma mater: Govt. Gandhi Memorial Science College, Delhi University

Vinod Kumar Gupta (10 September 1947 – 15 February 2025) was an Indian judge and the first permanent Chief Justice of the Jharkhand High Court. He also served as Chief Justice of the high courts of Himachal Pradesh and Uttarakhand.

== Life and career ==
Gupta completed his early education in Uttar Pradesh and Govt. Gandhi Memorial Science College, Jammu and Kashmir. He passed LL.B. from Delhi University and in 1970 he started practice in Delhi High Court. In his lawyer's career Gupta served as Advocate General of Jammu and Kashmir, Senior Central Government Standing Counsel of Jammu and Kashmir High Court. He associated with the Bar council activities, and held the offices of Bar President and Secretary.

On 7 November 1990 he was appointed as judge of the Jammu and Kashmir High Court. He was transferred to Calcutta High Court on 6 May 1996. He was appointed as judge of Patna High Court on 9 November 2000 and was further transferred and appointed Acting Chief Justice of Jharkhand High Court on 15 November 2000. He took oath as the first permanent Chief Justice of this High Court on 5 December 2000. Thereafter Justice Gupta joined as the Chief Justice of Himachal Pradesh High Court in 2003. Before the retirement he also held the post of the Chief Justice of the Uttarakhand High Court from 2 February 2008 to 9 September 2009.

Justice Gupta died on 15 February 2025, at the age of 77.
