= Mohammad Yaqoob Mir =

Former Chief Justice of Meghalaya High Court

Honourable Chief Justice (Retd.) Md.Yaqoob Mir

6th Chief Justice of Meghalaya High Court
- In office 21 May 2018 – 27 May 2019
- Nominated by: Dipak Misra
- Appointed by: Ram Nath Kovind
- Preceded by: Tarun Agarwala; Sudip Ranjan Sen (acting)
- Succeeded by: Ajay Kumar Mittal

Judge of Jammu and Kashmir High Court
- In office 23 November 2007 – 20 May 2018
- Nominated by: K. G. Balakrishnan
- Appointed by: Pratibha Patil
- Acting Chief Justice
- In office 5 January 2015 – 2 February 2015
- Appointed by: Pranab Mukherjee
- Preceded by: M. M. Kumar
- Succeeded by: N. Paul Vasanthakumar

Personal details
- Born: 28 May 1957 (age 68) Rajpora, Pulwama, Kashmir
- Education: LL.B
- Alma mater: Kashmir University

Mohammad Yaqoob Mir (born 28 May 1957) is an Indian judge and former Chief Justice of Meghalaya High Court.

== Career ==
Mir was born in 1957 at Rajpora, Pulwama, Kashmir. He passed LL.B. from Kashmir University and practiced as an Advocate since 1981 to 1993. Mir qualified for Higher Judicial Services and was appointed District and Sessions Judge on 27 May 1993. He also served as Special Judge, Anti-Corruption in the State of Jammu and Kashmir. He became the Registrar General of the High Court of Jammu and Kashmir. Mir attended International Conference on Arbitration (ICCA). He was appointed additional judge of the Jammu and Kashmir High Court in November 2007 and confirmed on 1 October 2009 as permanent judge of the same High Court. Justice Mir took charge as the Acting Chief Justice of the Jammu and Kashmir High Court from 5 January 2015 to 2 February 2015. On 21 May 2018, he was appointed Chief Justice of Meghalaya High Court.
