= Amrita Sinha =

Judge of Calcutta High Court

Hon'ble Ms. Justice Amrita Sinha

Judge of the Calcutta High Court
- Incumbent
- Assumed office 24 Aprail 2020
- Nominated by: Dipak Misra
- Appointed by: Ram Nath Kovind

Personal details
- Born: 25 December 1969 (age 56)
- Education: (LLB) National Law School of India University,Bengaluru

Justice Amrita Sinha is a judge of the Calcutta High Court, currently serving as Additional Judge at the Principal Seat in Calcutta.
