= Imtiaz Hussain (disambiguation) =

Imtiaz Hussain may refer to:

- Imtiaz Hussain, Pakistani general
- Imtiaz Hossain, Bangladeshi cricketer
- Imtiaz (retail chain)
- Hakim Imtiyaz Hussain, Indian judge
- Imtiyaz Husain, Indian film writer
