= Ajay Bhanot =

Indian judge

The Honourable Justice Ajay Bhanot

Judge of Allahabad High Court
- Incumbent
- Assumed office 22 September 2017
- Nominated by: Dipak Misra
- Appointed by: Ram Nath Kovind

Personal details
- Born: 4 August 1970 (age 56)
- Education: University of Lucknow

Justice Ajay Bhanotis a judge of the Allahabad High Court in the state of Uttar Pradesh, India.

== Early Life and Education ==
Bhanot Born on August 4, 1969. He completed his law graduation from Lucknow University in 1994.
