= Abdul Moin =

Indian judge (born 1968)

The Honourable Justice Abdul Moin

Judge of Allahabad High Court
- Incumbent
- Assumed office 22 September 2017
- Nominated by: Dipak Misra
- Appointed by: Ram Nath Kovind

Personal details
- Born: 1 November 1968 (age 57)
- Education: University of Lucknow

Abdul Moin (born 1 November 1968) is a judge of the Allahabad High Court in the state of Uttar Pradesh, India.

== Early life and education ==
He graduated in law from Lucknow University in 1992, and enrolled as an advocate on May 26, 1993. At Lucknow High Court, he practiced in civil, service, constitutional, revenue, and other areas. He was appointed as an additional judge of Lucknow High Court on Sept 22, 2017, and took an oath as a permanent judge on September 6, 2019.

== See also ==
- Judges of Allahabad High Court
