= Barin Ghosh (judge) =

Indian judge (1952-2015)

Hon'ble Chief Justice (Retd.) Barin Ghosh

8th Chief Justice of Uttarakhand High Court
- In office 12 August 2010 – 4 June 2014
- Nominated by: S. H. Kapadia
- Appointed by: Pratibha Patil
- Preceded by: J. S. Khehar
- Succeeded by: K. M. Joseph; V. K. Bist (acting)

13th Chief Justice of Sikkim High Court
- In office 13 April 2010 – 5 August 2010
- Nominated by: K. G. Balakrishnan
- Appointed by: Pratibha Patil
- Preceded by: Aftab Hussain Saikia
- Succeeded by: P. D. Dinakaran

27th Chief Justice of Jammu & Kashmir High Court
- In office 3 January 2009 – 12 April 2010
- Nominated by: K. G. Balakrishnan
- Appointed by: Pratibha Patil
- Preceded by: Manmohan Sarin; N. A. Kakru (acting)
- Succeeded by: Aftab Hussain Saikia

Judge of Patna High Court
- In office 7 January 2005 – 2 January 2009
- Nominated by: R. C. Lahoti
- Appointed by: A. P. J. Abdul Kalam

Judge of Calcutta High Court
- In office 14 July 1995 – 6 January 2005
- Nominated by: A. M. Ahmadi
- Appointed by: S. D. Sharma

Personal details
- Born: 5 June 1952
- Died: 7 October 2015 (aged 63) Kolkata
- Education: B.Com and LL. B.

Barin Ghosh (5 June 1952 – 7 October 2015) was an Indian judge and former Chief Justice of three High Courts of India i.e. Jammu & Kashmir High Court, Sikkim High Court and Uttarakhand High Court.

== Career ==
Ghosh was born in 1952. After passing B.Com., LL.B. he was enrolled as an Advocate on 19 December 1978 and practiced in the Calcutta High Court. He worked on Civil, Company and Constitutional matters. On 14 July 1995 he was appointed a Permanent Judge of the Calcutta High Court. Justice Ghosh was transferred to Patna High Court on 7 January 2005. He became the Chief Justice of Jammu and Kashmir High Court on 31 January 2009. Justice Ghosh was appointed the Chief Justice of the Sikkim High Court on 13 April 2010. He was transferred to the Uttarakhand High Court on 6 August 2010 and served there as Chief Justice. Ghosh died in Kolkata on 7 October 2015.
