= N. Kotiswar Singh =

Judge of the Supreme Court of India

The Honourable Justice Nongmeikapam Kotiswar Singh
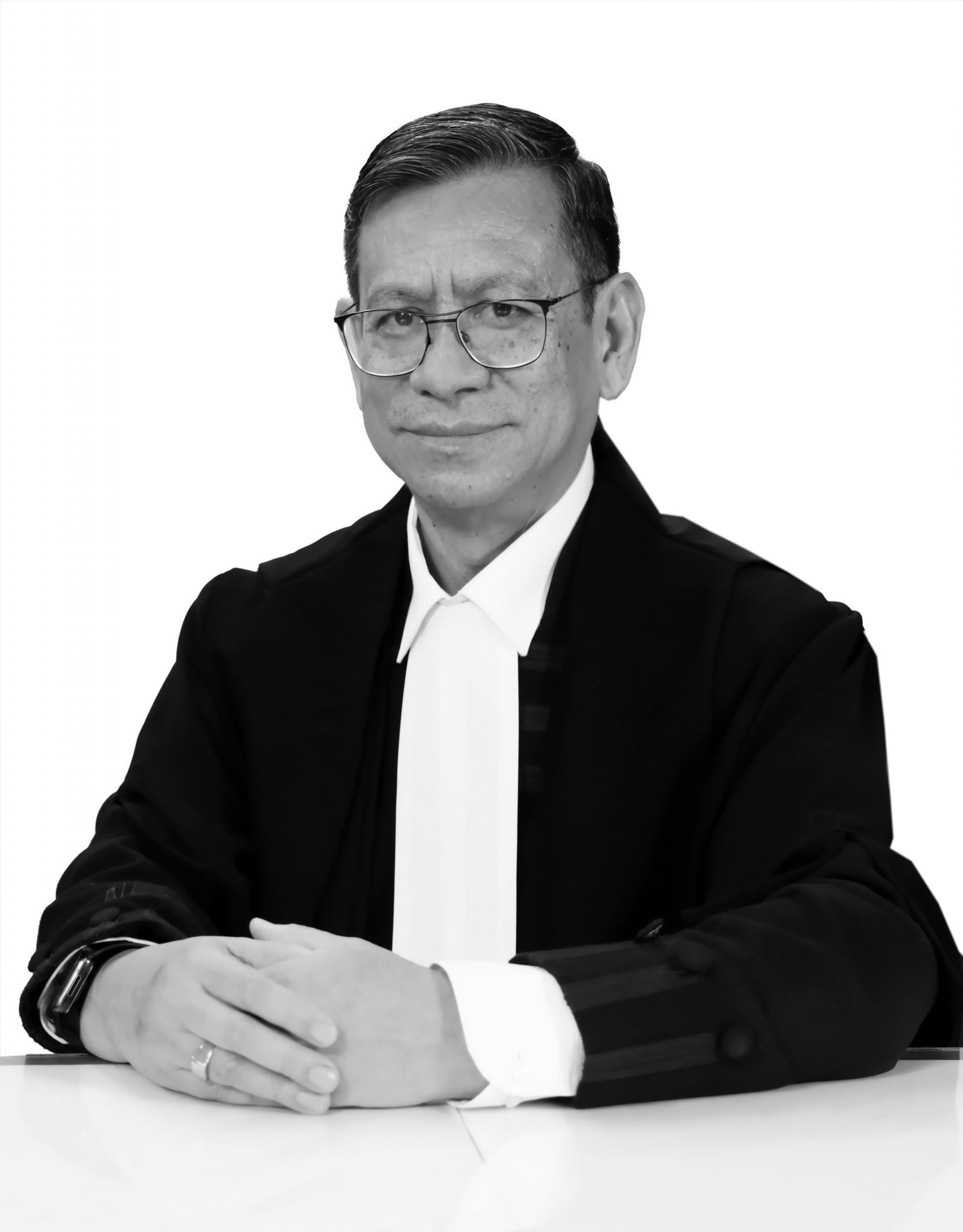
- Official portrait

Judge of Supreme Court of India
- Incumbent
- Assumed office 18 July 2024
- Nominated by: D. Y. Chandrachud
- Appointed by: Droupadi Murmu

36th Chief Justice of Jammu & Kashmir and Ladakh High Court
- In office 15 February 2023 – 17 July 2024
- Nominated by: D. Y. Chandrachud
- Appointed by: Droupadi Murmu
- Preceded by: A. M. Magrey; Tashi Rabstan (acting)
- Succeeded by: Tashi Rabstan

Judge of Gauhati High Court
- In office 11 October 2018 – 14 February 2023
- Nominated by: Ranjan Gogoi
- Appointed by: Ram Nath Kovind
- Acting Chief Justice
- In office 12 January 2023 – 14 February 2023
- Appointed by: Droupadi Murmu
- Preceded by: R. M. Chhaya
- Succeeded by: Sandeep Mehta
- In office 9 May 2022 – 22 June 2022
- Appointed by: Ramnath Kovind
- Preceded by: Sudhanshu Dhulia
- Succeeded by: R. M. Chhaya
- In office 21 September 2020 – 9 January 2021
- Appointed by: Ramnath Kovind
- Preceded by: Ajai Lamba
- Succeeded by: Sudhanshu Dhulia

Judge of Manipur High Court
- In office 23 March 2013 – 10 October 2018
- Nominated by: Altamas Kabir
- Appointed by: Pranab Mukherjee
- Acting Chief Justice
- In office 24 February 2018 – 17 May 2018
- Appointed by: Ramnath Kovind
- Preceded by: Abhilasha Kumari
- Succeeded by: R. Sudhakar
- In office 1 July 2017 – 8 February 2018
- Appointed by: Pranab Mukherjee
- Preceded by: R. R. Prasad
- Succeeded by: Abhilasha Kumari

Judge of Gauhati High Court
- In office 17 October 2011 – 22 March 2013
- Nominated by: S. H. Kapadia
- Appointed by: Pratibha Patil

Advocate General of Manipur
- In office 3 November 2007 – 16 October 2011
- Appointed by: Shivinder Singh Sidhu
- Chief Minister: Okram Ibobi Singh
- Preceded by: H. N. K. Singh
- Succeeded by: Th. Ibohal Singh

Personal details
- Born: 1 March 1963 (age 63) Imphal, Manipur
- Parent: N. Ibotombi Singh
- Education: Kirori Mal College; Faculty of Law, University of Delhi

Nongmeikapam Kotiswar Singh (born 1 March 1963) is a judge of Supreme Court of India. Previously, he has served as the Chief Justice of Jammu & Kashmir and Ladakh High Court. He is a former judge of Gauhati High Court and Manipur High Court. He has also served as the Acting Chief Justice of Gauhati High Court on three occasions and twice as Acting Chief Justice of Manipur High Court.

== Early life and career ==
Singh was born in 1963 in Imphal, Manipur. His father N. Ibotombi Singh was a former Judge of the Gauhati High Court and first Advocate General of the State of Manipur. Singh completed his schooling from Ramakrishna Mission Vidyapith, Purulia and graduated from Kirori Mal College in 1983. He passed LL.B. from the Delhi University in 1986. He practised in the Supreme Court, the Gauhati High Court and in the Central Administrative Tribunal.

On 3 November 2007 he was appointed Advocate General of Manipur. He was elevated as an Additional Judge of Gauhati High Court on 17 October 2011 and made permanent judge on 7 November 2012. He was appointed as Judge of Manipur High Court upon its creation on 23 March 2013 and chosen Manipur as his parent high court. He was appointed as Acting Chief Justice of Manipur High Court from 1 July 2017 to 8 February 2018 and again from 23 February 2018 to 17 May 2018. He was transferred as Judge of Gauhati High Court on 11 October 2018. He was appointed as Acting Chief Justice of Gauhati High Court from 21 September 2020 to 9 January 2021, from 9 May 2022 to 22 June 2022 and again from 12 January 2022 to 14 February 2022. He was appointed as Chief Justice of Jammu & Kashmir and Ladakh High Court on 15 February 2023.
