= Bahauddin Farooqi =

12th Chief Justice of Jammu & Kashmir High Court

Hon'ble Chief Justice Mufti Bahauddin Farooqi

12th Chief Justice of Jammu & Kashmir High Court
- In office 7 March 1983 – 23 August 1983
- Nominated by: Y. V. Chandrachud
- Appointed by: Zail Singh
- Preceded by: Mufti Jalal-ud-din
- Succeeded by: V. Khalid

Judge of Jammu & Kashmir High Court
- In office 27 August 1971 – 6 March 1983; Acting CJ : 23 February 1980–6 March 1983
- Nominated by: Sarv Mittra Sikri
- Appointed by: V. V. Giri

Personal details
- Born: 4 April 1924
- Died: 5 July 2014 (aged 90) Srinagar
- Education: Aligarh Muslim University (M.A. and LL.B)

Mufti Bahauddin Farooqi (4 April 1924 – 5 July 2014) was a Kashmiri lawyer, jurist and political figure who served as the 12th Chief Justice of the High Court of Jammu and Kashmir.

== Education and career ==
Born on 4 April 1924, Farooqi pursued higher education at Aligarh Muslim University (AMU), Aligarh. He obtained a master's degree in Arts and studied Law. He was also a topper in Mathematics. After completing his education, he began practising law at the District Court in Anantnag. He was enrolled as a pleader on 15 November 1946.

Farooqi joined the judicial service as a Munsiff on 12 October 1950 and later served as law secretary to the government during the regime of Ghulam Muhammad Sadiq. On 27 August 1971, he was elevated as an Additional Judge of the Jammu and Kashmir High Court and became a permanent judge on 6 March 1972. During his tenure, he authored a number of landmark judgments and his judgment regarding anti-defection was the first to be passed by any high court of the country. The judgment became the basis for anti-defection law ratified by the Indian Parliament.

He also served as Acting Chief Justice from 23 February 1980. In 1983, he became the Chief Justice of the Jammu and Kashmir High Court and served from 7 March 1983, to 23 August 1983. Farooqi resigned in 1983 as Jammu and Kashmir HC CJ, when he was transferred to Sikkim High Court, on the ground that the Government of India had no jurisdiction to transfer a Jammu and Kashmir HC judge to any part of the country as the state had a special status under Article 370 of the Indian constitution.

He also served as Chairman of the People Basic Rights Commission, an independent organization dedicated to investigating human rights violations committed by Indian Armed Forces in Kashmir, and seeking prosecution. Farooqi wrote to expose the Indian Government's tyrannical abuses of power against Kashmirs:

"That, nearly forty-two years back, India annexed the Jammu and Kashmir State by manipulation, fraud and force against the declared wishes of the people of the State. The people of the State scented mischief and continued the freedom struggle with added determination... That soon after the Indian Army landed in Kashmir, it mounted a powerful offensive on freedom fighters and imposed a reign of terror in the State. The Indian Government worked on the plan to weaken and dismember Pakistan and to maintain hegemony on Kashmir through sheer might." - ["My Frozen Turbulence in Kashmir," 7th Edition, by Jagmohan, page 127-128].

He died on 5 July 2014, at his residence at Srinagar at the age of 87.

== Media coverage ==
On 15 June 1990, Barbara Crossette, a former New York Times correspondent and current member of the Council on Foreign Relations, reported on the work of Justice Farooqi in the years following the deployment of "thousands of Indian troops and paramilitary forces" in Kashmir:

"In Srinagar, Mufti Bahauddin Farooqi, a former chief justice of the Jammu and Kashmir High Court, and his son, [Mufti] Showkat Ahmed Farooqi, a lawyer, have begun documenting allegations of human and civil rights violations against Kashmiris.

Talking about their work in an interview at Justice Farooqi's home, they say they focus on both the state administration and on the array of federal forces deployed here: the Indian Army, the paramilitary Central Reserve Police Force, the Border Security Force, the Indo-Tibetan Border Patrol, National Security Guards and various intelligence agencies.

Troops in Srinagar alone have commandeered at least 15 hotels as well as guest houses and private homes.

Justice Farooqi said the armed forces were sent to Kashmir in contravention of Jammu and Kashmir's special status in the Indian Constitution".
