= Tarun Agarwala =

5th Chief Justice of Meghalaya High Court

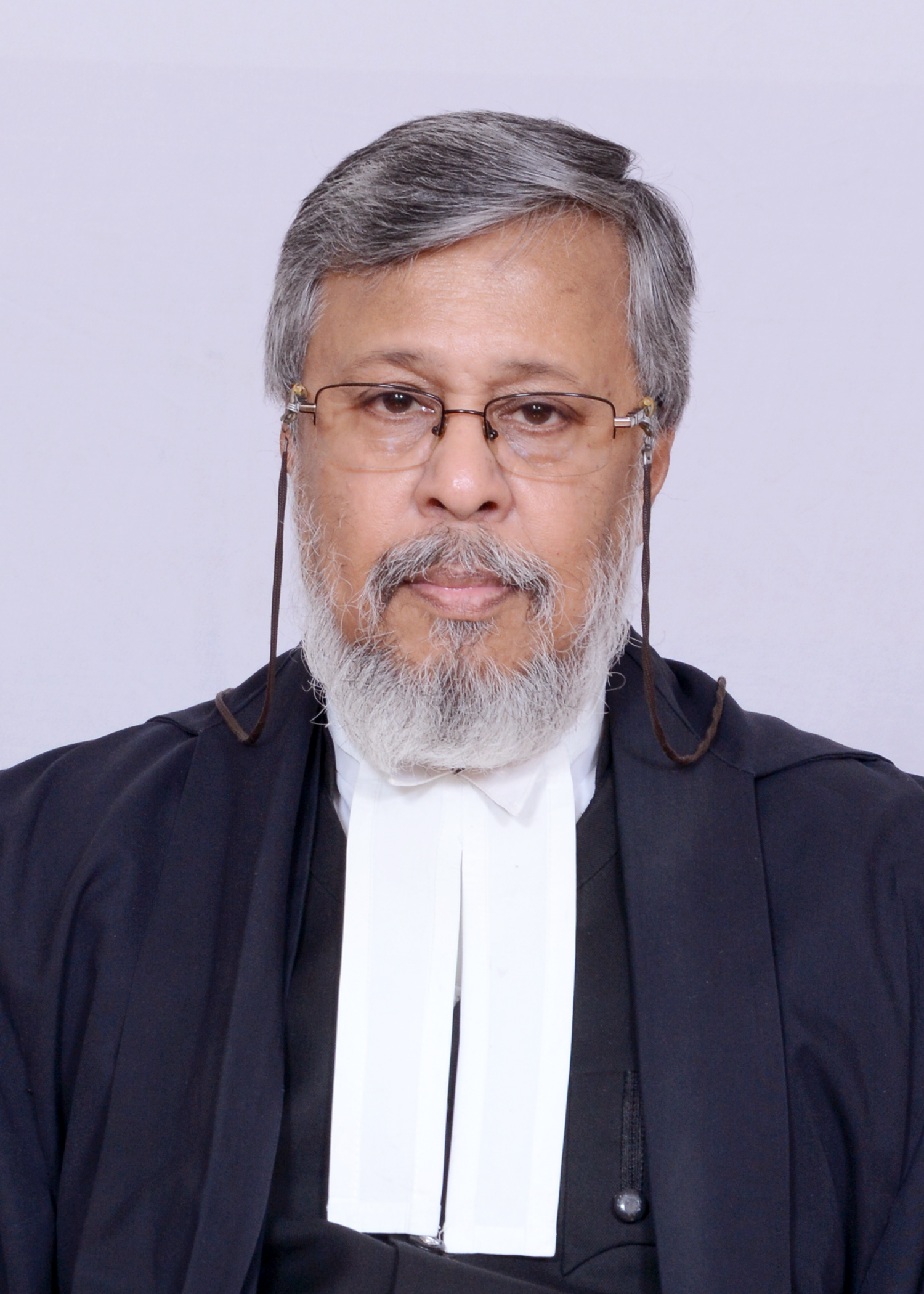

Presiding officer of Securities Appellate Tribunal
- In office 31 December 2018 – 30 December 2023
- Appointed by: Ramnath Kovind
- Preceded by: J. P. Devadhar
- Succeeded by: P. S. Dinesh Kumar

5th Chief Justice of Meghalaya High Court
- In office 12 February 2018 – 2 March 2018
- Nominated by: Dipak Misra
- Appointed by: Ramnath Kovind
- Preceded by: Dinesh Maheshwari
- Succeeded by: M. Y. Mir; Sudip Ranjan Sen (acting)

Judge of Allahabad High Court
- In office 17 October 2012 – 11 February 2018
- Nominated by: S. H. Kapadia
- Appointed by: Pranab Mukherjee
- In office 7 January 2004 – 24 September 2009
- Nominated by: V. N. Khare
- Appointed by: A. P. J. Abdul Kalam

Judge of Uttarakhand High Court
- In office 25 September 2009 – 16 October 2012
- Nominated by: K. G. Balakrishnan
- Appointed by: Pratibha Patil
- Acting Chief Justice
- In office 25 September 2009 – 28 November 2009
- Appointed by: Pratibha Patil
- Preceded by: V. K. Gupta; B. C. Kandapal (acting)
- Succeeded by: J. S. Khehar

Personal details
- Born: 3 March 1956 Allahabad, Uttar Pradesh
- Died: 30 March 2025 (aged 69)
- Parent: Satish Chandra
- Education: Allahabad University

Tarun Agarwala (3 March 1956 – 30 March 2025) was an Indian judge who was Chief Justice of Meghalaya High Court.

== Family ==
Agarwala was born on 3 March 1956 at Allahabad to his father Justice Satish Chandra, former chief justice of Allahabad and Calcutta High Courts. His grandfather Chandra Bhan Agarwala was also a judge of Allahabad High Court. Agarwala received his law degree from the University of Allahabad.

== Career ==
In 1981, he started practice on Civil, Constitutional and Taxation matters in Allahabad High Court. He became a Permanent Judge of the Allahabad High Court on 18 August 2005. He was transferred to Uttarakhand High Court in 2009 and served there as acting Chief Justice. He was elevated to the post of Chief Justice of Meghalaya High Court on 12 February 2018.

== Post retirement ==
After retirement Agarwala was appointed by the Government of India as the presiding officer of Securities Appellate Tribunal, Mumbai. Agarwala died, on 30 March 2025, at the age of 69, after suffering a heart attack following an accident that left him with severe head injuries.
