= Gita Mittal =

33rd Chief Justice of Jammu and Kashmir High Court

Hon'ble Chief Justice (Retd.) Gita Mittal
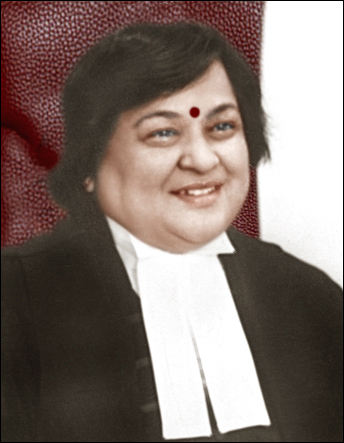

33rd Chief Justice of Jammu & Kashmir and Ladakh High Court
- In office 11 August 2018 – 8 December 2020
- Nominated by: Dipak Misra
- Appointed by: Ram Nath Kovind
- Preceded by: Alok Aradhe (acting)
- Succeeded by: Rajesh Bindal (acting)

Judge of Delhi High Court
- In office 16 July 2004 – 10 August 2018; Acting Chief Justice: 14 April 2017 – 10 August 2018
- Nominated by: Ramesh Chandra Lahoti
- Appointed by: A P J Abdul Kalam

Personal details
- Born: 9 December 1958 (age 67)
- Awards: Alumna Award; Nari Shakti Puruskar; Arline Pacht global vision Award, 2021

Justice Gita Mittal (born 9 December 1958) is a retired Indian judge. She is a former Chief Justice of the Jammu and Kashmir High Court and the first woman to serve in that capacity. She was also the Acting Chief Justice of Delhi High Court.

== Early life and education ==
Mittal was educated at Lady Irwin School in Delhi, graduating in 1975 with a focus on science. As a school student she was a member of the Girl Guides in India, and represented the organisation internationally at several events. She went on to obtain a Bachelor of Arts in Economics with Honours from the Lady Shriram College for Women, Delhi, in 1978, and also participated actively in athletics, acting as Sports President of the Lady Shri Ram College (1977–1978). Mittal studied law at the Campus Law Center in Delhi, graduating with an LL.B in 1981.

== Early career ==
Mittal practiced law in Delhi from 1981 to 2004, prior to her appointment as an Additional Judge in the Delhi High Court. She also acted as a counsel for the Delhi Development Authority, appearing for them in a case concerning demolitions of illegal structures.

== Judicial career ==
=== High Court of Delhi ===
Mittal was appointed an additional judge to the Delhi High Court on 16 July 2004, and was confirmed as a permanent judge on 20 February 2006. During her tenure as a High Court judge, she heard both civil and criminal matters.

During her tenure as a High Court Judge, Mittal served on a number of administrative and judicial committees at the Court. She was the Chair of the Delhi High Court's Mediation and Conciliation Center, and served on committees that dealt with complaints concerning sexual harassment, working conditions, performance assessment of judges in subordinate courts, and judicial training. Mittal also served on a committee concerning the implementation of legal guidelines that governed child witnesses in cases concerning sexual offences. As part of this, she led an initiative to establish special courtrooms for vulnerable witnesses in the Delhi High Court, with the first such courtroom being established in 2012.

On 14 April 2017, Mittal was appointed the Acting Chief Justice of the Delhi High Court.

==== Criticism in Times of India report ====
On 17 May 2016, The Times of India published an article reporting that a litigant had written to the Chief Justice of India and other judges of the Supreme Court, complaining that Justice Mittal's disposal of cases was slow and constrained by her involvement in administrative work, as a result of which she allegedly did not sit in court for sufficient time to hear matters, and that this had personally affected the litigant. The Times of India reported that they had verified the numbers presented by the litigant and confirmed them. Justice Mittal's office responded, indicating that the litigant had no pending cases in her court. The report was widely criticised by members of the Bar. The Delhi High Court Bar Association condemned it as inaccurate and thirty-four senior advocates wrote a letter to the Times of India calling on the newspaper to issue an apology to Justice Mittal for inaccuracies in their report, and attesting to her work at the Delhi High Court in disposing of disputes. On 31 May 2016, it was reported that the Delhi High Court had accepted an unconditional apology from Times of India for the report.

==== Jurisprudence at the Delhi High Court ====
Mittal wrote a number of significant judgments as a judge at the Delhi High Court, many of which concern the conditions of service and recruitment in military and para-military forces in India. In 2011, along with Justice R. Midha she passed a significant ruling concerning the rights of transgender individuals, holding that a woman with a congenital hormonal anomaly had been unfairly discriminated against when she was prohibited from joining the Sashastra Seema Bal (a border patrol organisation) as a female constable. In 2013, along with Justice Deepa Sharma, she held that colour-blindness could not be grounds for discrimination in the context of promotion in the Central Reserve Police Force. In 2018, she held that advertisements prohibiting women from applying for recruitment to the Indian Territorial Army violated the Territorial Army Act, 1948, which allows men and women to apply.

She has also served on the benches of several significant cases concerning political figures. In 2013, she held that Congress leader N.D. Tiwari could not be compelled to provide a blood sample against his will, in a paternity suit filed against him, although an adverse inference could be drawn from his refusal to provide the sample. Her order was later reversed by a different High Court bench, which compelled him to provide a sample. However, in 2016, along with Justice IS Mehta, she laid down principles that courts should follow in hearing cases concerning pleas for court-ordered paternity tests. In 2014, along with Justice J.R. Midha, she dismissed an appeal filed in the Nitish Katara murder case, upholding the trial court's conviction of Vikas Yadav, the son of Uttar Pradesh politician D.P. Yadav. In 2017, along with Justice C. Hari Shankar, she dismissed an appeal filed by retired Calcutta High Court judge C.S. Karnan, in which he had challenged the constitutionality of the Indian Contempt of Courts Act.

Mittal has also contributed to jurisprudence that focuses on constitutional rights. In 2013 she ruled that the Delhi High Court could not prohibit entry to persons who didn't have identity cards, noting that access to justice would be impeded by such a rule. In August 2018, she and Justice C. Hari Shankar found that the provisions of the Bombay Prevention of Begging Act, 1959 were largely unconstitutional, and struck it down.

=== High Court of Jammu and Kashmir and Ladakh ===
On 3 August 2018, Mittal was appointed Chief Justice of the High Court of Jammu and Kashmir. She is the first female Chief Justice of that court. She retired on 8 December 2020.

==== Appointment of additional judges ====
In 2019, Mittal wrote to the Supreme Court of India calling for the appointment of additional judges to handle the caseload at the Jammu and Kashmir High Court, noting that the Court was functioning at half its judicial capacity with only ten judges serving instead of the allocated seventeen. Justice Mittal forwarded seven names for the consideration of the Supreme Court collegium, which appoints judges to the High Courts in India. In April 2020, three Permanent Judges were appointed to the Court, bringing the total number of serving judges to thirteen.

==== Creation of CAT Bench in Jammu and Kashmir ====
In May 2020, Mittal wrote to the Government of India in her capacity as Chief Justice of the Jammu and Kashmir High Court, calling for the establishment of a bench of the Central Administrative Tribunal in Jammu and Kashmir, to hear cases concerning the service conditions of officers in the Indian Administrative Service. In her letter she noted that the passing of the Jammu and Kashmir Reorganisation Act 2019 had resulted in the need to transfer a number of pending service matters from the High Court to such tribunals. The publication of her letter met with opposition from the Chairman of the Central Administrative Tribunal, Justice L. Narasimha Reddy, who disputed the need for a separate bench in Jammu and Kashmir at that time. In April 2020, the Central Government issued a notification extending the jurisdiction of the Chandigarh bench of the Central Administrative Tribunal to Jammu and Kashmir; however, following criticisms that this would cause difficulties in access, the Government modified its order to create a separate Central Administrative Tribunal bench in Jammu and Kashmir and Ladakh.

==== Jurisprudence at the High Court of Jammu and Kashmir ====
On 25 October 2019, Mittal authored a significant judgment in Suhail Rashid Bhat v State of Jammu and Kashmir, striking down the Jammu & Kashmir Prevention of Beggary Act, 1960, a law drawing from colonial legal principles to penalise poverty and public movement. Along with Justice Rajesh Bindal, she held that the criminalisation of beggary violated constitutional principles and constituted a “disproportionate infringement of the right to meaningful life, dignity, privacy and liberty guaranteed under Article 21”.

=== Tribunals and regulatory bodies ===
Mittal has served as a member of the Advisory Board constituted under the Conservation of Foreign Exchange & Prevention of Smuggling Act, 1974 (COFEPOSA).

In February 2008, she was appointed the sole judge in a tribunal constituted under the Unlawful Activities (Prevention) Act, 1967 to investigate a ban on the activities of the Students Islamic Movement of India (SIMI). As judge, Mittal found that the government did not have grounds to enforce an extension of a previous ban against SIMI, as it had failed to present new evidence to support its argument for the extension. Her decision was stayed soon after by the Supreme Court, allowing the ban on SIMI to continue.

== Other activities and awards ==
Mittal has served on the governing boards of several educational institutions. She has been a member of the Governing Council of the National Law University, Delhi since 2008, and Governing Council of the Indian Law Institute, New Delhi since 2013. She was a member of the Delhi University Court from 1999 to 2004, and was nominated to the governing body of Ram Lal Anand College in Delhi from 1997 to 1999.

Justice Mittal also serves on the editorial advisory board of the National Law University Delhi's Journal of Legal Studies.

In 2008, the Vice President of India, Mohammad Hamid Ansari, awarded Mittal the 'Distinguished Alumna Award' from Lady Shriram College, recognising her contributions to jurisprudence. In 2019, she received the Justice P.N. Bhagwati Award for her contributions towards improving access to justice and for her work in designing and introducing special courts for vulnerable victims in the Delhi High Court.

=== Criticism concerning Nari Shakti Puraskar ===
In 2017, Mittal was one of the recipients of the Nari Shakti Puraskar, a civilian honour presented by the Ministry of Women and Child Development of the Government of India to individuals and organisations contributing to female empowerment. Her acceptance of a government award while serving as a judge led to public criticism and concerns about conflicts of interest and the independence of the judiciary, particularly as it was the first instance of a sitting judge accepting an award from the government. Several advocates and retired judges noted that prior to this, only retired judges had accepted government awards, and argued that her acceptance of a government award ought to disqualify her from hearing cases in which the government is a litigant.
