= Arun Palli =

Judge of Supreme Court of India

Hon'ble Justice Arun Palli
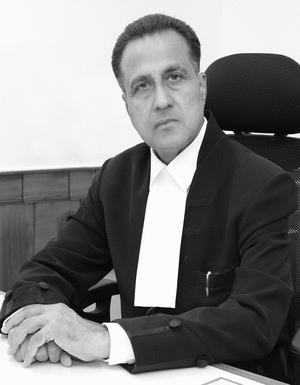

Judge of Supreme Court of India
- Incumbent
- Assumed office 2 June 2026
- Nominated by: Surya Kant
- Appointed by: Droupadi Murmu

38th Chief Justice of Jammu & Kashmir and Ladakh High Court
- In office 16 April 2025 – 1 June 2026
- Nominated by: Sanjiv Khanna
- Appointed by: Droupadi Murmu
- Preceded by: Tashi Rabstan; Sanjeev Kumar (acting)
- Succeeded by: P. S. Bhati; Sanjeev Kumar (acting)

Judge of Punjab & Haryana High Court
- In office 28 December 2013 – 15 April 2025
- Nominated by: P. Sathasivam
- Appointed by: Pranab Mukherjee

Personal details
- Born: 18 September 1964 (age 61) Patiala, Punjab, India
- Education: B.Com and L.L.B
- Alma mater: Panjab University

Arun Palli (born 18 September 1964) is an Indian jurist and currently serving as a judge of Supreme Court of India after since 2 June 2026. He served as the 38th Chief Justice of the Jammu and Kashmir and Ladakh High Court. He is a former judge of Punjab and Haryana High Court.

== Early life ==
Palli was born on 18 September 1964 in Patiala. He belongs to legal family as his great-grandfather Lachchman Dass Palli and grandfather Lajpat Rai Palli were lawyers of Patiala District Bar. His father Prem Kishan Palli was a Senior Advocate and also served as a judge of Himachal Pradesh High Court from where he retired in 1998. He graduated in Commerce and completed his Bachelor of Laws from Panjab University at Chandigarh in 1988.

== Career ==
He commenced his legal practice at the Punjab and Haryana High Court. He gained expertise across diverse areas of law, including civil, criminal, constitutional, revenue, industrial, and labour law. He was appointed Additional Advocate General for Punjab on September 1, 2004, a position he held until March 2007. He was designated as a Senior Advocate on 26 April 2007.

He was elevated as judge of the Punjab and Haryana High Court on 28 December 2013 and was confirmed as permanent judge on 19 December 2014. He has also been serving as Executive Chairman of Haryana State Legal Service Authority since 31 May 2023. He was also nominated as a Member of the Governing Body of the National Legal Services Authority (NALSA) on 31 October 2023 for a period of two years.

On 4 April 2025, Supreme Court Collegium led by CJI Sanjiv Khanna recommended his name for the post of Chief justice of Jammu and Kashmir and Ladakh High Court and on 16 April 2025, he was sworn in as the 38th CJ of Jammu Kashmir High Court.

He has been recommended by the Supreme Court Collegium for elevation as Judge of the Supreme Court of India, along with three other sitting Chief Justices of High Courts, Chief Justice of the Punjab and Haryana High Court Justice Sheel Nagu, Chief Justice of the Bombay High Court Justice Shree Chandrashekhar, Chief Justice of the Madhya Pradesh High Court Justice Sanjeev Sachdeva and a Senior Advocate of Supree Court V. Mohana.

On 1 June 2026, the Central Government has notified the elevation of these 5 persons as judges of the Supreme Court and he took oath as judge of the Supreme Court of India on 2 June 2026.
