= S. A. Dharmadhikari =

47th Chief Justice of Madras High Court

Hon'ble Chief Justice Sushrut Arvind Dharmadhikari

47th Chief Justice of Madras High Court
- Incumbent
- Assumed office 6 March 2026
- Nominated by: Surya Kant
- Appointed by: Droupadi Murmu
- Preceded by: M. M. Shrivastava

Judge of Kerala High Court
- In office 23 April 2025 – 5 March 2026
- Nominated by: Sanjiv Khanna
- Appointed by: Droupadi Murmu

Judge of Madhya Pradesh High Court
- In office 7 April 2016 – 22 April 2025
- Nominated by: T. S. Thakur
- Appointed by: Pranab Mukherjee

Personal details
- Born: 8 July 1966 (age 60) Raipur, Chhattisgarh
- Parent(s): Arvind H. Dharmadhikari, Shubha Dharmadhikari
- Education: B. Com and LL.B
- Alma mater: Nagpur University

Sushrut Arvind Dharmadhikari (born 8 July 1966) is an Indian judge currently serving as the 47th Chief Justice of Madras High Court since March 2026. He also served as a Judge of the Kerala High Court and the Madhya Pradesh High Court.

== Early life and career ==
Justice Dharmadhikari was born on 8 July 1966 at Raipur in Chhattisgarh. He completed his Graduation in commerce and law from Nagpur University. In 1992 he enrolled as an advocate in Madhya Pradesh High Court. He had been linked to one of the most important legal matters in India's history as he served as counsel for Welfare commissioner for Bhopal Gas Tragedy victims. He served as standing counsel for Union of India from 2000 to 2015.

He was appointed as an Additional Judge of the Madhya Pradesh High Court on 7 April 2016 and was made permanent on 17 March 2018. In April 2025 he was transferred to Kerala High Court and took oath as such on 23 April 2025. In Kerala High Court, Justice Dharmadhikari was a part of the two judge division bench which was hearing plea against the release of The Kerala Story 2 Goes Beyond.

In February 2026, Supreme court collegium recommended his elevation as chief justice of Madras High Court by superseding justice Atul Sreedharan, who was senior to Dharmadhikari and he was appointed as such and took oath on 6 March 2026.
