= Ladakh Bench of High Court of Jammu & Kashmir and Ladakh =

Bench of the Jammu & Kashmir and Ladakh High Court in Ladakh

Ladakh Bench of the Jammu & Kashmir and Ladakh High Court
- Ladakh Bench Inauguration at Leh in presence of Chief Justice of India Justice Surya Kant and lieutenant governors of Ladakh Vinai Kumar Saxena and others
- Established: 27 August 2026; 2 months ago
- Jurisdiction: Ladakh
- Location: Leh, Ladakh, India
- Authorised by: Constitution of India
- Appeals to: Supreme Court of India
- Website: jkhighcourt.nic.in

The Ladakh Bench is a bench of the High Court of Jammu & Kashmir and Ladakh, established to enable sittings of the High Court in the union territory of Ladakh, India.

== Background ==
Ladakh became a separate Union territory on 31 October 2019 following the enactment of the Jammu and Kashmir Reorganisation Act, 2019. It shares the High Court of Jammu and Kashmir and Ladakh with the Union territory of Jammu and Kashmir. The High Court has its principal seat at Srinagar, with a seat at Jammu.

Before the establishment of a sitting bench in Ladakh, litigants from the Union territory generally had to travel outside Ladakh to access proceedings before the High Court. The region's difficult terrain and long distances created practical difficulties in accessing higher judicial remedies.

== History ==
=== Approval and establishment ===
The Union Cabinet, chaired by Prime Minister Narendra Modi, approved the proposal to enable the sitting of a bench of the High Court of Jammu and Kashmir and Ladakh in Ladakh on 20 August 2026. Union Home Minister Amit Shah said that the decision would significantly improve access to justice for people living in the remote areas of Ladakh.

The decision was taken amid discussions between the Union government and representatives of Ladakh concerning constitutional safeguards and other political demands. The establishment of the bench was presented as a measure to bring higher judicial services closer to residents of the Union territory.

=== Presidential promulgation ===
On 27 August 2026, President Droupadi Murmu promulgated the Union Territory of Ladakh (Sitting of Bench of the High Court of Jammu and Kashmir and Ladakh in Ladakh) Regulation, 2026. The Regulation was issued under Article 240 of the Constitution of India, read with section 58(2) of the Jammu and Kashmir Reorganisation Act, 2019. It was published in the Gazette of India Extraordinary on the same day.

The Regulation extends to the whole of the Union territory of Ladakh. It provides that Judges and Division Courts of the High Court may also sit at a place within Ladakh appointed by the Chief Justice, with the approval of the Lieutenant Governor of Ladakh.

The notification, issued on 5 September 2026, brought the Union Territory of Ladakh (Sitting of Bench of the High Court of Jammu and Kashmir, and Ladakh in Ladakh) Regulation, 2026 (No. 10 of 2026) into force with effect from that date.

=== Inauguration ===
On 18 October 2026, the Chief Justice of India, Justice Surya Kant, inaugurated the High Court Bench at Leh and launched digital initiatives, including an e-filing portal, a document management system and an online recruitment portal. The initiatives aim to establish a fully IT-enabled, paperless court and improve access to justice, particularly for residents of remote areas.

== Significance ==
The establishment of the bench is intended to reduce the time, travel and expense involved for litigants from Ladakh seeking access to the High Court. The Administration of the Union Territory of Ladakh described the measure as fulfilling a long-standing demand for improved access to higher judicial remedies within the Union territory.

The Lieutenant Governor of Ladakh, Vinai Kumar Saxena, welcomed the President's promulgation of the Regulation and said that the measure would make access to higher judicial remedies easier for residents of the Union territory.

== See also ==
- High Court of Jammu & Kashmir and Ladakh
- Judiciary of India
- Ladakh
- Jammu and Kashmir Reorganisation Act, 2019
- High courts of India
