= Lala Kanwar Sain =

1st Chie Justice of Jammu & Kashmir High Court

1st Chief Justice of Jammu and Kashmir High Court
- In office 27 April 1928 – 16 February 1931
- Appointed by: Hari Singh
- Preceded by: Office established
- Succeeded by: Birjor Dalal

Personal details
- Profession: Judge

Lala Kanwar Sain was an Indian Judge and the first Chief Justice of the High Court of Jammu and Kashmir.

== Career ==
The High Court of Jammu and Kashmir was established in 1928. Lala Kanwar Sain was appointed to the office in 1928 following the establishment of the High Court by Maharaja Hari Singh, the ruler of the princely state of Jammu and Kashmir. Kanwar Sain served as Chief Justice from 27 April 1928 to 16 February 1931. He was succeeded by Birjor Dalal.
