= Barjor Jamshedjee Dalal =

2nd Chief Justice of Jammu & Kashmir High Court

Prime Minister of Jammu and Kashmir
- In office 1936
- Monarch: Maharaja Hari Singh
- Preceded by: Elliot James Dowell Colvin
- Succeeded by: N. Gopalaswami Ayyangar

2nd Chief Justice of Jammu & Kashmir High Court
- In office 16 February 1931 – 23 November 1936
- Appointed by: Maharaja Hari Singh
- Preceded by: Kanwar Sain
- Succeeded by: Abdul Qayoom

Judge of Allahabad High Court
- In office 1925 – 15 February 1931
- Appointed by: George V

Personal details
- Profession: Judge

Barjor Jamshedji Dalal was an Indian jurist who served as the Chief Justice of the Jammu and Kashmir High Court and held the office of Prime Minister of Jammu and Kashmir in 1936.

== Career ==
Dalal, in his judicial career, served as a judge of Allahabad High Court from 1925 to 1931 and Chief Justice of the Jammu and Kashmir High Court. In addition to his judicial roles, he also briefly served as the Prime Minister of Jammu and Kashmir in 1936.

== Commission of Inquiry ==
Following the 13 July Incident, on 14th July 1931, the Maharaja's government appointed a Commission of Inquiry. This commission was chaired by Dalal, with two judges of the High Court, B.R. Sawhney and Abdul Qaiyum, as official members. Two non-official members, one Muslim and the other Hindu, were also part of the commission.
