= Government of Kashmir =

The Government of Kashmir may refer to:

- Government of Azad Kashmir
- Government of Jammu and Kashmir

== See also ==
- Government of Gilgit-Baltistan
- Administration of Ladakh
