= S. P. Ayyaswamy Mudaliar =

S. P. Ayyaswamy Mudaliar was a freedom fighter from the Indian state of Tamil Nadu. His house Gandhi Peak in Royapettah, Chennai hosted many INC meetings. Even today it is preserved by his family members. Netaji Subashchandra Bose stayed in his house on two occasions. Ayyaswami Mudaliar was a civil engineer by profession. The Chief Justice of Manipur High Court R Sudhakar is his great-grandson.
