= Bodh Raj Sawhney =

20th-century Indian judge

Judge of First High Court of Jammu and Kashmir
- In office 1928–1936 Serving with Khan Bahadur Aga Syed Hussain Thakur
- Succeeded by: Pandit Kishen Lal Kichlu

Bodh Raj Sawhney was a judge of the first High Court of Jammu and Kashmir upon its establishment in March 1928 in British India. He was appointed as a puisne judge, along with Khan Bahadur Aga Syed Hussain.
