= Syed Murtaza Fazl Ali =

Indian judge (1920–1985)

Hon'ble Justice Syed Murtaza Fazl Ali

Judge of Supreme Court of India
- In office 2 April 1975 – 20 August 1985
- Nominated by: A. N. Ray
- Appointed by: Fakhruddin Ali Ahmed

8th Chief Justice of Jammu & Kashmir High Court
- In office 3 December 1967 – 1 April 1975
- Nominated by: K. N. Wanchoo
- Appointed by: Zakir Husain
- Preceded by: J. N. Wazir
- Succeeded by: Raja Jaswant Singh

Judge of Jammu & Kashmir High Court
- In office 9 April 1958 – 2 December 1967
- Nominated by: Sudhi Ranjan Das
- Appointed by: Rajendra Prasad

Personal details
- Born: 20 December 1920
- Died: 20 August 1985 (aged 64)
- Spouse: Mrs. Bahar Murtaza Ali
- Parent: Fazal Ali (father)
- Education: B.A (Hons.) and LL.B
- Alma mater: Aligarh Muslim University, Patna University

Syed Murtaza Fazl Ali (20 December 1920 – 20 August 1985) was a judge of the Supreme Court of India and a former Chief Justice of the Jammu and Kashmir High Court.

== Early life ==
He was born in an aristocratic Shia Muslim family to Khan Bahadur Sir Sayyid Fazal Ali, the Governor of Assam and Odisha. He received his primary education in St. Joseph Convent, Patna (Bihar) and passed Matriculation in 1936 and B.A.(Hons.) in English in 1940. He attended the I.C.S. Coaching Classes of the Aligarh University from 1942 to 1943. He passed B.L. (Bachelor of Laws) from Patna University in First Division.

== Career ==
He was enrolled as an Advocate on 8 November 1944 and practised on Civil, Criminal, Original and Constitutional sides of the High Court as also in the Subordinate Courts. He was also on the panel of State Lawyers. He was appointed Judge of the High Court of Jammu and Kashmir on 9 April 1958 and Chief Justice of the said High Court in December 1967. He was Chairman of the Unlawful Activities (Prevention) Tribunal in the year 1971, Vice-chairman of the Amar Singh Club, Srinagar, a Member of the Nehru Award Jury from February 1972 to February 1975. He was appointed Judge of the Supreme Court of India on 2 April 1975. He died on 20 August 1985 while a sitting judge of the Supreme Court and lies buried near Dargah Shah-i-Mardan in the Jorbagh Karbala complex, Delhi. He is one of the very few judges, who died in office of Supreme Court of India.
