= Jagdish Singh Khehar =

Indian jurist (born 1952)

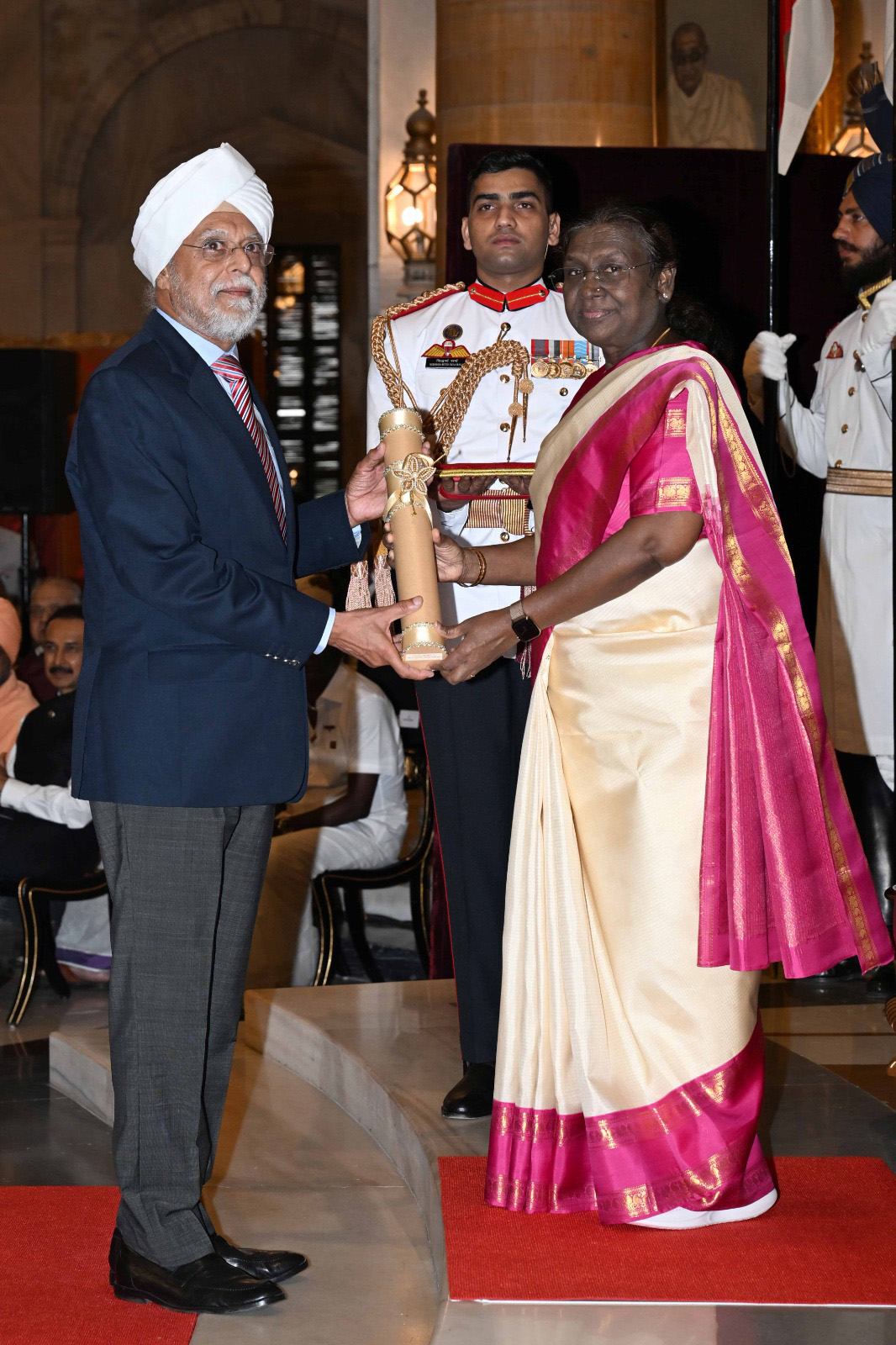
- President of India, Droupadi Murmu presenting the Padma Vibhushan to Khehar (c. 2025)

44th Chief Justice of India
- In office 4 January 2017 – 27 August 2017
- Appointed by: Pranab Mukherjee
- Preceded by: T. S. Thakur
- Succeeded by: Dipak Misra

Judge of Supreme Court of India
- In office 13 September 2011 – 3 January 2017
- Nominated by: S. H. Kapadia
- Appointed by: Pratibha Patil

25th Chief Justice of Karnataka High Court
- In office 8 August 2010 – 12 September 2011
- Nominated by: S. H. Kapadia
- Appointed by: Pratibha Patil
- Preceded by: P. D. Dinakaran
- Succeeded by: Vikramajit Sen

7th Chief Justice of Uttarakhand High Court
- In office 29 November 2009 – 7 August 2010
- Nominated by: K. G. Balakrishnan
- Appointed by: Pratibha Patil
- Preceded by: V. K. Gupta; B. C. Kandapal (acting); Tarun Agarwala (acting)
- Succeeded by: Barin Ghosh

Judge of Punjab & Haryana High Court
- In office 8 February 1999 – 28 November 2009
- Nominated by: A. S. Anand
- Appointed by: K. R. Narayanan
- Acting Chief Justice
- In office 17 November 2009 – 28 November 2009
- Appointed by: Pratibha Patil
- Preceded by: T. S. Thakur
- Succeeded by: Mukul Mudgal; M. S. Gill (acting)
- In office 2 August 2008 – 10 August 2008
- Appointed by: Pratibha Patil
- Preceded by: Vijender Jain
- Succeeded by: T. S. Thakur

Personal details
- Born: 28 August 1952 (age 74) Nairobi, British Kenya, now Nairobi, Kenya
- Education: Panjab University, Chandigarh
- Occupation: Judge
- Awards: Padma Vibhushan (2025)
- Religion: Sikhism

Jagdish Singh Khehar (born 28 August 1952) is an Indian jurist, who served as the 44th Chief Justice of India from 4 January 2017 to 27 August 2017. He was the first Sikh Chief Justice of India. He has been a judge in Supreme Court of India from 13 September 2011 to 27 August 2017 upon superannuation. He served for a brief period but gave many landmark judgements such as the Triple Talaq and the Right to Privacy verdicts. He was succeeded by Justice Dipak Misra. As Chief Justice of India, he also administered oath of office to 14th President of India Ram Nath Kovind.

== Career ==
He was appointed to the Chandigarh Bench of Punjab and Haryana High Court, on 8 February 1999. He was appointed as Acting Chief Justice of the Punjab and Haryana High Court from 2 August 2008 and again from 17 November 2009.

He was named as Chief Justice of the High Court of Uttarakhand on 29 November 2009 and later served as Chief Justice of High Court of Karnataka, where he assumed his office on 8 August 2010.

He was appointed as Judge of the Supreme Court of India and assumed office as Judge of Supreme Court on 13 September 2011 and later appointed and served as Chief Justice of India from 4 January 2017 to 27 August 2017.

== Notable judgements ==
Khehar led the five-judge Constitution Bench in Supreme Court Advocates on Record Association v. Union of India [2016(5) SCC 1]. By enabling the collegium system to continue, Khehar quashed the NJAC Act and also declared 99th Amendment to the Constitution unconstitutional. The majority concluded this judgment:

While adjudicating upon the merits of the submissions advanced at the hands of the learned counsel for the rival parties, I have arrived at the conclusion, that clauses (a) and (b) of Article 124A(1) do not provide an adequate representation, to the judicial component in the NJAC, clauses (a) and (b) of Article 124A(1) are insufficient to preserve the primacy of the judiciary, in the matter of selection and appointment of Judges, to the higher judiciary (as also transfer of Chief Justices and Judges, from one High Court to another). The same are accordingly, violative of the principle of "independence of the judiciary.

Khehar further explained:

...that clause (c) of Article 124 A (1) is ultra-vires the provisions of the Constitution, because of the inclusion of the Union Minister in charge of Law and Justice as an ex officio Member of the NJAC. Clause (c) of Article 124A (1), in my view, impinges upon the principles of "independence of the judiciary", as well as, "separation of powers". It has also been concluded by me, that clause (d) of Article 124A (1) which provides for the inclusion of two "eminent persons" as Members of the NJAC is ultra vires the provisions of the Constitution, for a variety of reasons. The same has also been held as violative of the "basic structure" of the Constitution.

Khehar headed a historic five judge Constitution bench in Nabam Rebia & Bamand Felix v. Bamang Felix Deputy Speaker & Others, [2016(8) SCC 1] that reinstated the Congress-led Arunachal Pradesh Government and held all the actions of the Governor violative of the Constitution. Alluding S. R. Bommai v. Union of India [(1994)3 SCC 1] Khehar avowed that it had "all the powers to put the clock back".

The Supreme Court bench headed by Khehar imposed an exemplary cost of Rs. 25 lakh on NGO Suraz India Trust for filing 64 frivolous cases in various high courts and also in the apex court and wasting the judicial time. (Decided on 1 May 2017).

Khehar in State of Punjab vs. Jagjit Singh (Decided on 26 October 2016) gave a significant verdict holding that the principal of 'equal pay for equal work' has to be made applicable to those engaged as daily wagers, casual and contractual employees who perform the same duties as the regulars.

Khehar was also a part of the bench which sent Sahara Chief Subrata Roy to jail while hearing the matter relating to the refund of money invested by people in his two companies.

Heading a three-judge bench of Punjab and Haryana High Court Khehar decided a case involving definition of a Sikh. He held that religion must be perceived as it is, and not as another would like it to be.

=== Right to Privacy verdict ===
Right to Privacy verdict officially known as Justice K. S. Puttaswamy (Retd.) and Anr. vs Union Of India And Ors is a landmark decision of the Supreme Court of India, in which a nine-judge bench including Khehar held that the right to privacy is protected as a fundamental right under Articles 14, 19 and 21 of the Constitution of India.

=== 2G spectrum case ===
As an aftermath of Supreme Court's landmark decision in the 2G spectrum case, the government of India filed a presidential reference before the Supreme Court. Khehar gave a separate concurring opinion in which he warned that the government should not be under erroneous impression that it is not necessary to allocate natural resources through auction.

No part of the natural resource can be dissipated as a matter of largess, charity, donation or endowment, for private exploitation. Each bit of natural resource expended must bring back a reciprocal consideration.

— Justice J. S. Khehar, Supreme Court of India,

=== Triple talaq case ===
Khehar was one of the judges on multi-faith bench that heard the controversial Triple Talaq case in 2017. Though Khehar upheld the practice of validity of Triple Talaq (Talaq-e-Biddat), it was barred by the bench by 3:2 majority and asked the Central government to bring legislation in six months to govern marriage and divorce in the Muslim community. The court said till the government formulates a law regarding triple talaq, there would be an injunction on husbands pronouncing triple talaq on their wives.

=== Endosulfan judgment ===
On 10 January 2017, Justice Khehar [heading a bench of 3 judges] ordered Kerala State Government to compensate about 5000 victims of endosulfan poisoning. A total of Rs 500 crores was to be disbursed among them, within a period of three months. A petition in this respect had been filed by the Democratic Youth Federation of India.

== Allegations ==
In 2017, the Committee on Judicial Accountability published the suicide note written by former Arunachal Pradesh Chief Minister, Kalikho Pul. In the note, Pul claimed that Khehar had demanded ₹49 crore (Para 15.22, Page 39) and ₹31 crore (Para 15.27, Page 41) in bribes from Pul for delivering a favourable verdict. The Committee on Judicial Accountability has demanded a probe in the matter.

== Honours ==
In 2025, he was awarded the Padma Vibhushan by the Government of India for his contributions in the field of Public Affairs.

Legal offices
Preceded by T. S. Thakur	Chief Justice of India; 4 January 2017–27 August 2017	Succeeded by Dipak Misra
