= Pushpendra Singh Bhati =

39th Chief Justice of Jammu & Kashmir High Court

The Honourable Chief Justice Pushpendra Singh Bhati
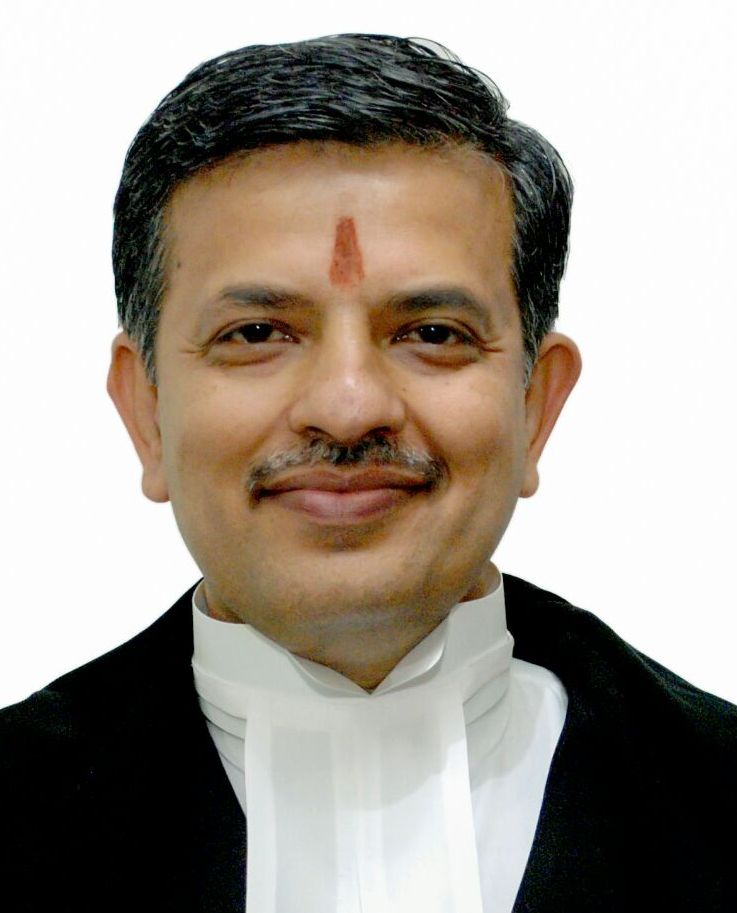

39th Chief Justice of Jammu & Kashmir and Ladakh High Court
- Incumbent
- Assumed office 9 September 2026
- Nominated by: Surya Kant
- Appointed by: Droupadi Murmu
- Preceded by: Arun Palli; Sanjeev Kumar (acting)

Judge of Rajasthan High Court
- In office 16 November 2016 – 8 September 2026
- Nominated by: T. S. Thakur
- Appointed by: Pranab Mukherjee

Personal details
- Born: 21 September 1970 (age 55)
- Spouse: Justice Nupur Bhati
- Relations: Aishwarya Bhati (sister)
- Education: B.A., LL.B, LL.M and Ph.D

Pushpendra Singh Bhati (born 21 September 1970) is an Indian jurist, who is currently serving as the Chief Justice of High Court of Jammu & Kashmir and Ladakh since 9 September 2026. He is former judge of the Rajasthan High Court.

== Family background ==
Bhati was born on 21 September 1970 and comes from a family rooted in military discipline and legal service. His father is Group Captain Karan Singh Bhati, a retired veteran of the Indian Air Force who later transitioned into the legal field to practice as an advocate. This blend of disciplined upbringing and legal exposure shaped the careers of his children, leading to a generation of top-tier legal professionals. Legal excellence runs deep in his immediate household, as his wife, Dr. Nupur Bhati, is also a sitting Judge of the Rajasthan High Court since 16 January 2023. Their concurrent service made judicial history by establishing them as a rare husband-wife duo serving on the bench of the exact same High Court at the same time.

The family's legal prominence extends heavily through his siblings as well. Bhati is part of three siblings, which includes his younger sister, Aishwarya Bhati. She is a trailblazing litigator who made history as one of the youngest female lawyers to be designated a Senior Advocate by the Supreme Court of India, and she currently serves the nation as an Additional Solicitor General of India. The extended family remains tightly woven into public and legal service, as his brother-in-law, Jaideep Singh, is a practicing advocate, and the family shares deep roots with other respected military veterans, including Brigadier Sawai Singh.

== Education and career ==
Bhati completed his educational journey by earning a B.A., LL.B., an LL.M. in Mercantile Law, and a Ph.D. with a specialized focus on public employment and the role of the Supreme Court of India. He officially enrolled as an advocate in the year 1992. For nearly 25 years, he maintained a highly successful practice at the Rajasthan High Court, handling diverse fields such as writ jurisdiction, criminal matters, public interest litigations, and revenue law. His expertise led to notable appointments, including serving as the Additional Advocate General for Rajasthan and acting as the Standing Counsel for the Indian Railways for 16 years.

Recognising his deep legal acumen, he was elevated to the bench as an Additional Judge of the Rajasthan High Court on 16 November 2016 and was later made a permanent judge on 16 March 2018.

In the present development, the Supreme Court Collegium, in its high-level meeting held on 31 August 2026, officially recommended transferring and elevating Justice Bhati. He has been proposed to serve as the next permanent Chief Justice of the High Court of Jammu & Kashmir and Ladakh, where he will succeed Acting Chief Justice Sanjeev Kumar. His elevation has been cleared by government on 5 September 2026. Lieutenant Governor of Ladakh, Vinai Kumar Saxena administered of oath of office to Bhati on 9 September 2026.

This notable elevation means the Collegium effectively selected a judge junior to Justice Sanjeev Prakash Sharma for a crucial Chief Justice role. This tactical choice generated massive ripples across the legal community, particularly because Justice Sharma is merely 23 days away from his retirement.
