= Habibullah Badsha =

Indian lawyer (1933–2017)

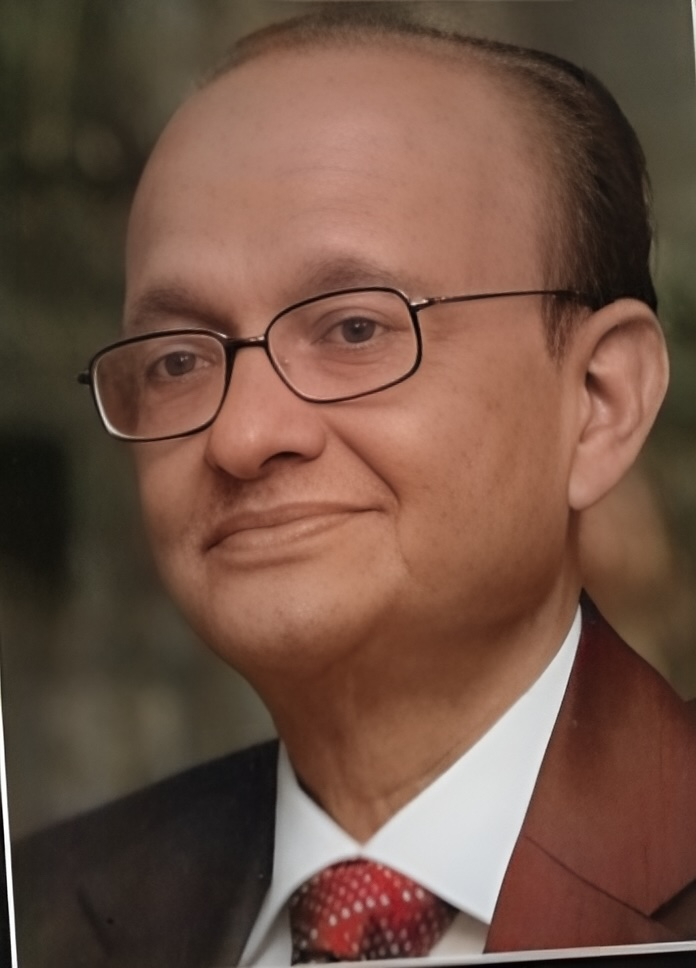
- Born: 1933
- Died: 2017 (aged 83–84)
- Education: Church Park, Chennai; Christ’s Church School in Chennai; Presidency College; Madras University

Habibullah Badsha (1933–2017) was an Indian lawyer and public servant known for his contributions to the legal system of Tamil Nadu, India.

== Early life and education ==
Born on March 8, 1933, Badsha did his schooling from Church Park and Christ’s Church School in Chennai. Following his graduation and post-graduation degrees in Islamic studies from Presidency College, he obtained his law degree from Madras University.

== Career ==
In 1957, Habibullah Badsha began his legal career by enrolling as an advocate. He initially worked as a junior under Senior Advocate Govind Swaminadhan, a former Crown Prosecutor and Advocate General of Tamil Nadu (1969–1976). Over the course of his distinguished career, Badsha held several key positions, including standing counsel for the Central Government in 1967 and state Public Prosecutor for the Madras High Court in 1974. In 1986, he declined an appointment as a judge of the Supreme Court, choosing instead to continue his practice as an advocate. The following year, Chief Minister M.G. Ramachandran appointed him as Special Public Prosecutor to handle a high-profile case involving the burning of copies of the Constitution by 10 DMK MLAs during the party's anti-Hindi agitation.

In 1991, Badsha was appointed Advocate General of Tamil Nadu. However, when DMK president M. Karunanidhi offered him the same role in 1996, he declined due to health concerns. Throughout his career, he was celebrated as a role model, known for championing secularism and minority rights. He also actively participated in philanthropic endeavors, contributing to organizations such as the Muslim Educational Association of Southern India (MEASI) and the Anjuman-E-Himayath-E-Islam. He was a Founding Director and on the Board of Directors of Apollo Hospitals India. He was also Founder and Managing Director of Maschmeijer Aromatics Pvt Ltd.

Many of his juniors went on to achieve distinguished positions, including Justice N. Kirubakaran, Justice Akbar Ali and Justice R. Sudhakar of the Madras High Court.

== Personal life ==
Badsha was born into a business family of Madras India. The Badsha family — members of the Urdu Muslim mercantile elite — were one of the leaders in extending business relationships to places like Arabia, Egypt and Japan.

Badsha was married to Shyamala, his college classmate and the daughter of Rajagopal Naidu. He is survived by his three children: Abdul Jabbar Suhail, Dr. Humeira Badsha, and Maimoona Badsha.

== Death ==
Badsha died on November 17, 2017, at the age of 84 due to age-related complications.
