= Adarsh Sein Anand =

29th Chief Justice of India

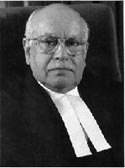

4th Chairperson National Human Rights Commission
- In office 17 February 2003 – 31 October 2006
- Appointed by: A. P. J. Abdul Kalam
- Preceded by: J S Verma
- Succeeded by: S. Rajendra Babu

29th Chief Justice of India
- In office 10 October 1998 – 1 November 2001
- Appointed by: K. R. Narayanan
- Preceded by: Madan Mohan Punchhi
- Succeeded by: Sam Piroj Bharucha

Judge of Supreme Court of India
- In office 18 November 1991 – 9 October 1998
- Nominated by: Ranganath Misra
- Appointed by: Ramaswamy Venkataraman

24th Chief Justice of Madras High Court
- In office 1 November 1989 – 17 November 1991
- Nominated by: Engalaguppe Seetharamiah Venkataramiah
- Appointed by: Ramaswamy Venkataraman
- Preceded by: Shanmughasundaram Mohan
- Succeeded by: Kanta Kumari Bhatnagar

14th Chief Justice of Jammu and Kashmir High Court
- In office 11 May 1985 – 31 October 1989
- Nominated by: Yeshwant Vishnu Chandrachud
- Appointed by: Zail Singh
- Preceded by: Vazhakkul Angarayil Khalid
- Succeeded by: S. S. Kang

Judge of Jammu and Kashmir High Court
- In office 26 May 1975 – 10 May 1985
- Nominated by: Ajit Nath Ray
- Appointed by: Fakhruddin Ali Ahmed

Personal details
- Born: 1 November 1936 Jammu and Kashmir, British India
- Died: 1 December 2017 (aged 81) Sector-14, Noida, Uttar Pradesh
- Education: L.L.B. LL.D.
- Alma mater: University of Lucknow; University of London
- Awards: Padma Vibhushan (in 2008)

Adarsh Sein Anand (1 November 1936 – 1 December 2017) was the 29th Chief Justice of India, serving from 10 October 1998 to 31 October 2001.

== Early life and education ==
He was born in the state of Jammu & Kashmir on 1, November, 1936, and received his early education from Model Academy at Jammu. Anand completed his studies from GGM Science College (erstwhile Prince of Wales College), Jammu in 1958. He pursued L.L.B with First Class and Diploma in Labour Laws from the University of Lucknow in 1960 and was awarded Degree of Doctor of Philosophy in Laws (Constitutional Law of the Commonwealth) from the University of London in 1963. He passed the Bar Exam at the Inner Temple, London in 1964. Thereafter, he practiced in Criminal Law, Constitutional Law and Election Law at the Punjab and Haryana High Court in Chandigarh.

Enrolled as an Advocate at the Bar Council on 9 November 1964. Having practised in Criminal Law, Constitutional Law, Election Law at the Punjab and Haryana High Court. At the age of 38 years and six months, he was appointed Additional Judge, Jammu and Kashmir High Court from 26 May 1975 and confirmed as a permanent Judge of the same Court in February, 1976. He became the Chief Justice, Jammu and Kashmir High Court on 11 May 1985 and transferred to the Madras High Court on 1 November 1989. He was appointed a Judge of the Supreme Court of India, on 18 November 1991.

Over the course of his Supreme Court tenure, Anand authored 196 judgments and sat on 911 benches.

On 17 February 2003, he took over as the Chairperson of the National Human Rights Commission and was succeeded by Justice Rajendra Babu on 2 April 2007.

In February 2010, he was appointed chairman of a five-member committee set up to examine the safety aspects of the Mullaperiyar Dam in Kerala. The panel submitted the report on 25 April 2012.

== Honours ==
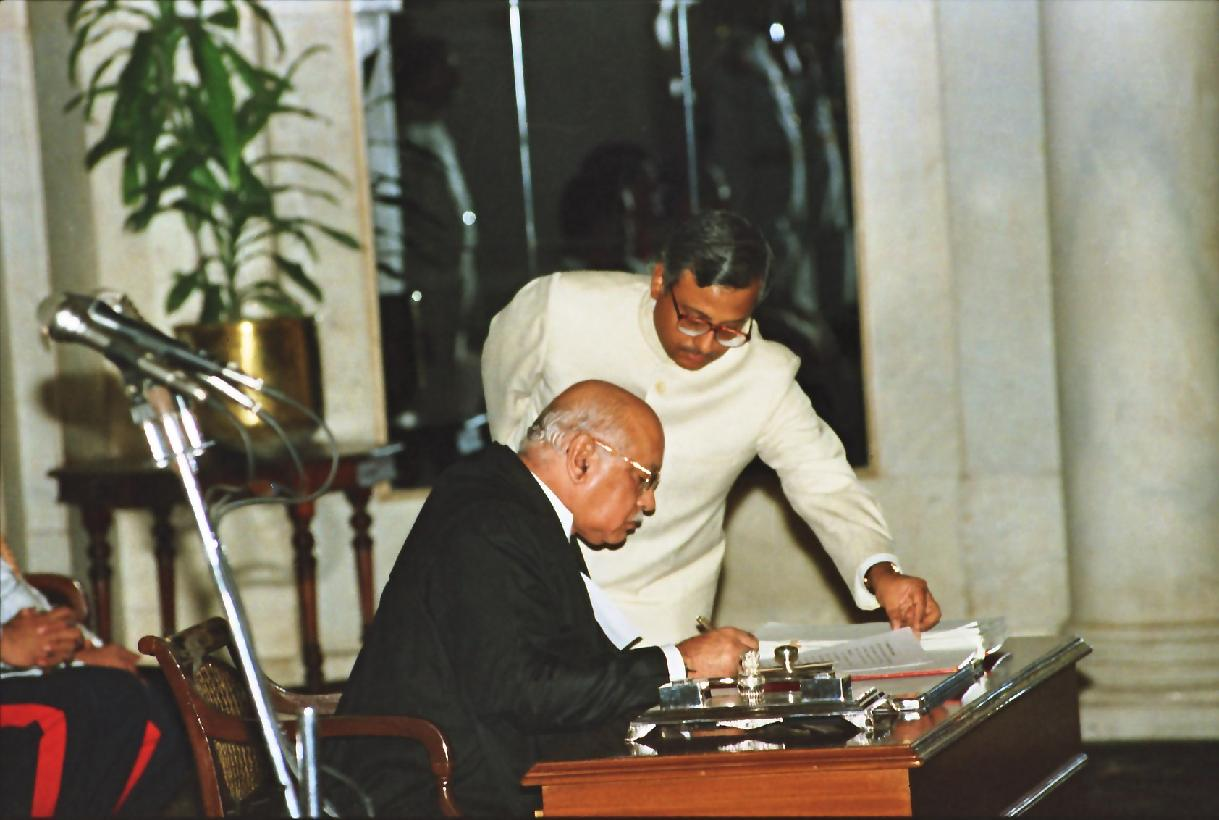
The Chief Justice of India, Adarsh Sein Anand signing the oath register after assuming office

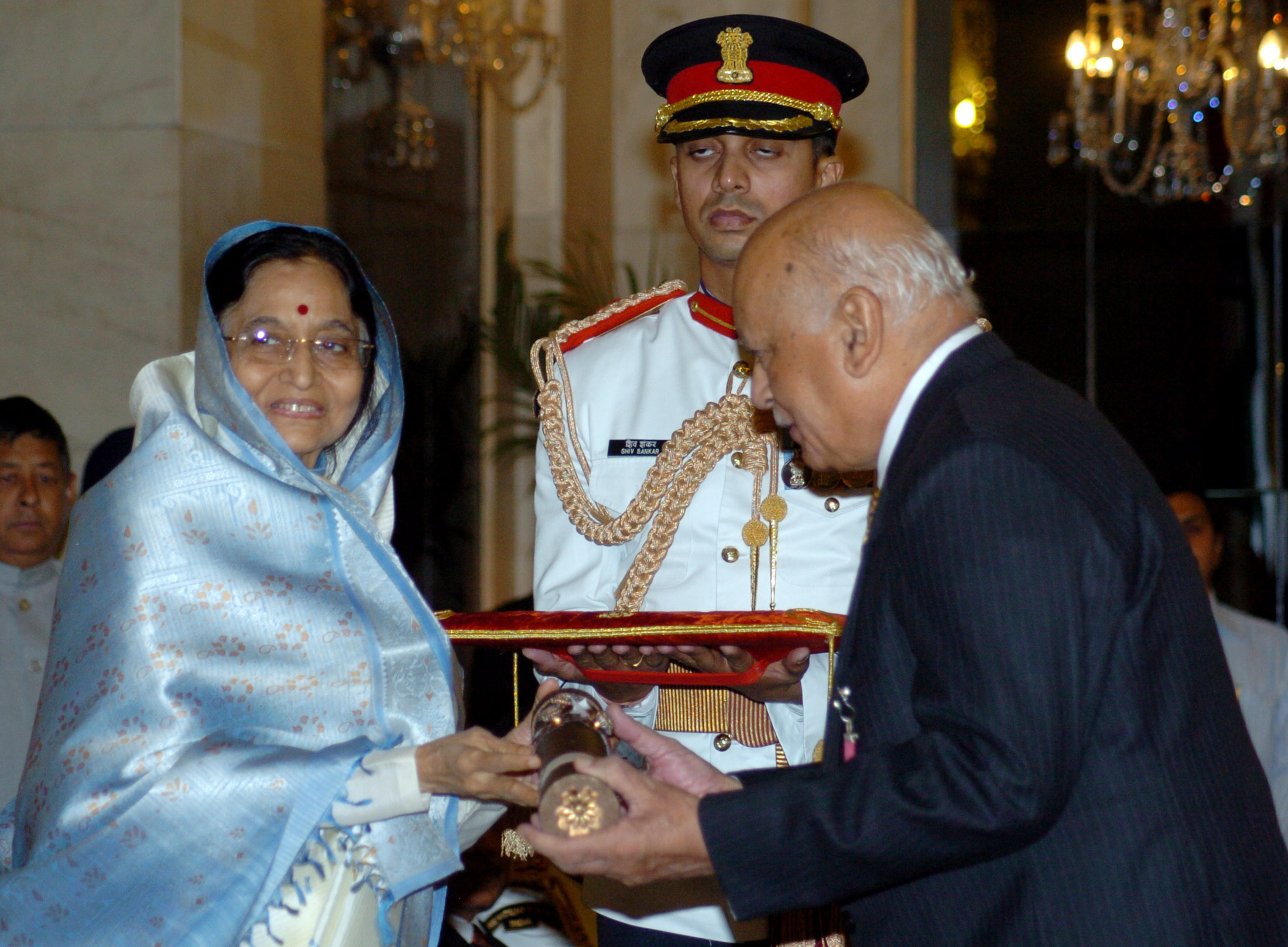
The President, Smt. Pratibha Devisingh Patil presenting the Padma Vibhushan to Justice (Dr.) Adarsh Sein Anand at Civil Investiture-II Ceremony, at Rashtrapati Bhavan, in New Delhi on 10 May 2008

Anand was unanimously elected President of the International Institute of Human Rights Society in 1996. In 1997, he became the first Indian to be awarded the Fellowship of University College London, his alma mater. Anand was nominated as the Executive Chairman of the National Legal Services Authority, a statutory body, with effect from July 1997 in recognition of his contribution to legal aid for the poor. He was also unanimously elected Honorary Bencher of the Inner Temple this year. He is the author of the book, The Constitution of Jammu and Kashmir – Its Development and Comments. On 26 January 2008, Anand was honoured with the Padma Vibhushan, the second highest civilian award in India.

Awarded the Degree of LL.D. (Honoris Causa) at the Special Convocation held by University of Lucknow on 14 March 1996.

Awarded Fellowship of the University College, London, on 19 May 1997.

Elected as Hony. Bencher of the Hon'ble Society of Inner Temple, London, in 1998.

Awarded Degree of D.Litt. (Honoris Causa) at the 9th Convocation held at Jammu University on 20 March 1999.

Awarded Honorary Fellowship for Life by the Society for Advanced Legal Studies, London, in October 2000.

Awarded Degree of LL.D. (Honoris Causa) by Punjab University, Chandigarh, on 28 December 2001.

Recipient of 'Shiromani Award – 2002' for Outstanding Achievements in the Field of Judiciary and Commitment to National Progress and Human Welfare on 30 August 2003.

Awarded Degree of LL.D. (Honoris Causa) by Banaras Hindu University on 29 November 2003, for Achievements and Contribution to the Development of Law and Protection of Human Rights.

Recipient of Plaque of Honour from the University of Lucknow for outstanding contribution to the Country and Society on 25 November 2004.

Awarded 'Dogra Ratan Award instituted by Council for Promotion of Dogri Language, Culture & History, Jammu on 27 October' 2006 at Jammu.

Awarded National Law Day award by the President of India for "Outstanding contribution to fair and efficient administration of justice" on 24 November 2007.

== Landmark judgements ==
At least three landmark judgments given by Anand as the Judge of the Supreme Court have revealed his commitment to human rights and justice.

1. In the Nilabeti Behera case (1993), which he heard jointly with J.S. Verma, (later CJI) his separate judgment on the right of compensation in the cases of custodial deaths is hailed as a significant contribution to the protection of human rights. Anand held that public bodies and officials are expected to perform public duties properly and refrain from unlawful actions that are likely to violate individual rights under Article 21 of the Constitution.
2. In the D.K. Basu case (1996), he laid down important safeguards against custodial torture. These safeguards are considered valuable in protecting the rights of prisoners.
3. Anand's commitment to judicial discipline is also highlighted in his judgment in the V.C. Mishra case. The Supreme Court first sentenced the Chairman of the Bar Council of India, V.C. Mishra, for contempt of court and suspended him from practising. Later, a Bench headed by Anand ruled that the Supreme Court did not have the power to debar any advocate from practising even if it held him guilty of contempt.

== Corruption allegations ==
Anand had a controversial tenure as Chief Justice of India. Activists have made four serious charges of corruption and abuse of office against Anand. No probe, however, was conducted on any of the allegations.

Preceded by Madan Mohan Punchhi	Chief Justice of India; 10 October 1998– 1 November 2001	Succeeded by Sam Piroj Bharucha
