= Tashi Rabstan =

Judge of Jammu & Kashmir and Ladakh High Court

Hon’ble Chief Justice Tashi Rabstan

Chief Justice of Jammu & Kashmir and Ladakh High Court
- In office 27 September 2024 – 9 April 2025
- Nominated by: Dhananjaya Y. Chandrachud
- Appointed by: Droupadi Murmu
- Preceded by: N. Kotiswar Singh
- Succeeded by: Arun Palli; Sanjeev Kumar (Acting)

Acting Chief Justice of Jammu & Kashmir and Ladakh High Court
- In office 18 July 2024 – 26 September 2024
- Appointed by: Droupadi Murmu
- In office 8 December 2022 – 14 February 2023
- Appointed by: Droupadi Murmu

Judge of Jammu & Kashmir and Ladakh High Court
- In office 8 March 2013 – 26 September 2024
- Nominated by: Altamas Kabir
- Appointed by: Pranab Mukherjee

Personal details
- Born: 10 April 1963 (age 63) Skurbuchan
- Education: University of Jammu

Tashi Rabstan (born 10 April 1963) is a retired Indian judge and a senior advocate practising at the Supreme Court of India. He was the Chief Justice of Jammu & Kashmir and Ladakh High Court. He has also served as Acting Chief Justice of Jammu & Kashmir and Ladakh High Court.

== Career ==
He was born on 10 April 1963 at village Skurbuchan, Leh Ladakh. He did his graduation and LL.B from University of Jammu. On 6 March 1990, he was enrolled in Bar Council of Jammu and Kashmir and started practising in Jammu & Kashmir and Ladakh High Court and in various other High Courts. He has served as Standing Counsel for Ladakh Autonomous Hill Development Council, Leh from 1997 to 2005. He was appointed as Central government counsel for Jammu & Kashmir and Ladakh High Court in September 1998. He has also served as panel counsel for Union Public Service Commission from April 2008 to 31 December 2011. He was appointed as an Additional Judge of Jammu & Kashmir and Ladakh High Court on 8 March 2013 and made permanent on 16 May 2014. He has served as Acting Chief Justice of Jammu & Kashmir and Ladakh High Court from 8 December 2022 to 14 February 2023.

He retired on 9 April 2025 upon reaching mandatory retirement age of 62 years for High Court judges.
