= Badar Durrez Ahmed =

Indian Judge

Hon'ble Chief Justice (Retd.) Badar Durrez Ahmed
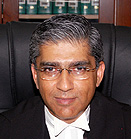
- Official portrait

Chief Justice of Jammu and Kashmir High Court
- In office 1 April 2017 – 15 March 2018
- Nominated by: J. S. Khehar
- Appointed by: Ram Nath Kovind

Judge of Delhi High Court
- In office 20 December 2002 – 30 March 2017
- Nominated by: Gopal Ballav Pattanaik
- Appointed by: A. P. J. Abdul Kalam

Personal details
- Born: 16 March 1956 (age 70) Shillong

Badar Durrez Ahmed (born 16 March 1956) is a retired Indian judge, a former Chief Justice of Jammu and Kashmir High Court and judge of Delhi High Court. He also served as Acting Chief Justice of Delhi High Court twice.

== Life ==
Ahmed was born in 1956 in Shillong, Meghalaya, the son of Dr. Fakhruddin Ali Ahmed who was President of India (24 August 1974 – 11 February 1977) by his wife, Abida Begum, a lady from Haldoi. He is related to the royal family of Loharu and to the famous Urdu poet Mirza Ghalib.

Ahmed is married to Saba Begum (born on 2 February 1959), younger daughter of Nawab Sayyid Zulfikar Ali Khan Bahadur, Nawab of Rampur, by his wife Begum Noor Bano. The couple has one daughter and one son.

== Career ==
Born on 16 March 1956 in Shillong (Meghalaya), he studied in St Edmund’s College, Shillong, (1962-1966) and St Columba’s High School, New Delhi (1966-1971). He graduated from St. Stephen’s College, Delhi in 1975 with a BA (Hons) Economics. He completed the Tripos in Economics from Trinity College, Cambridge in 1977 and was a Lecturer in Economics St Stephen's College from 1977 to 1979. He enrolled as an advocate in 1980 and served in the chambers of Siddhartha Shankar Ray from 1980 to 1983. He practised independently between 1983 and 1986, and became a partner in the law firm "Lawyers Associated" in 1986, remaining in that position until 2002.

In 2002, Badar Durrez Ahmed was appointed a judge of the Delhi High Court. He served in that position for fifteen years, before being appointed Chief Justice of the High Court of Jammu and Kashmir. He served as Chief Justice from 1 April 2017 to 16 March 2018 and retired after the latter date.

During his eleven-month tenure as Chief Justice of the state of Jammu and Kashmir, he delivered a landmark judgment wherein he acquitted the accused Subhash Chander Sharma, who was sentenced to death under section 302 RPC and 498A RPC by the Sessions Judge, Jammu. Subhash Chander Sharma was pleading his own case in the High Court. The judgment was dictated in open court on the same day.
