= Permod Kohli =

Indian Judge

Permod Kohli (born 1 March 1951) is a retired Indian judge and former Chief Justice of Sikkim High Court.

== Career ==
Kohli was born at Rajouri in 1951. He graduated from Govt. Gandhi Memorial Science College and passed Law from University of Jammu in 1972. He was appointed Additional Advocate General, later Advocate General of Jammu. On 7 January 2003 Kohli was appointed additional Judge of the Jammu and Kashmir High Court. Thereafter he was transferred to the Jharkhand High Court in 2006. He also became the judge of Punjab and Haryana High Court on 10 May 2007. On 12 December 2011, Justice Kohli was elevated to the post of the Chief Justice of Sikkim High Court. After the retirement he was appointed the Chairman of Central Administrative Tribunal (CAT).
