= Himachal Pradesh Board of School Education =

State education board of the Government of Himachal Pradesh in India

- हिमाचल प्रदेश विद्यालय शिक्षा बोर्ड
- Abbreviation: HPBOSE
- Formation: 1969
- Founder: Government of Himachal Pradesh
- Type: State education board
- Legal status: Active
- Purpose: Regulation and development of school education in Himachal Pradesh
- Headquarters: Dharamshala, Himachal Pradesh, India
- Services: Conducting examinations for secondary and senior secondary education
- Official language: Hindi, English
- Parent organization: Government of Himachal Pradesh
- Affiliations: State Government Education Department
- Website: hpbose.co.in

Himachal Pradesh Board of School Education is the Himachal Pradesh state government-administered autonomous examining authority for the secondary and senior secondary examinations headquartered in Dharmashala, India, with the responsibility of prescribing courses of instruction and textbooks . It was set up in 1969 and has its headquarters in Dharmshala. Kultar Chand Rana from Kangra was the first chairman. At present, more than 8000 schools are affiliated with the Board. The Board establishes 1650 examination centres for over 500,000 examinees each year. Sh. Ankush Sharma(HAS) is the current Secretary of the HPBOSE appointed by the Government of Himachal Pradesh. Dr. Rajesh Sharma is the current chairman of the board. The current and newly elected president of the Board Employees Association is Sh. Sunil Sharma, who belongs to Shimla district of the state.

== History ==
The Himachal Pradesh Board of School Education, Dharamshala, came into existence in 1969 under the Himachal Pradesh Act No. 14 of 1968, with its headquarters at Shimla, later shifted to Dharamshala in January 1983. The Board started with a staff of 34 officials, which has subsequently increased to 438. The Education Board prescribes syllabi, courses of instruction, and textbooks for school education in Himachal Pradesh, besides conducting examinations based on the courses listed. At present, the Board conducts examinations for the following classes and courses: 8th (Private Capacity), 10th, 10+1, 10+2, J.B.T and T.T.C. As many as 5 Lakh candidates appear in the Board's annual examination. Presently, more than 8000 schools are affiliated with the Board. The Board has set up 1650 Examination centres throughout the state. The board also publishes textbooks for classes 1 to 12. Apart from a liaison office in Shimla, the board has also established 19 book depots/information centres across the state to cater to students' needs

HP board take state level examination for 10th and 12th standard in March.
