= Hakim Imtiyaz Hussain =

Former judge of the High Court of Jammu and Kashmir

Judge of Jammu and Kashmir High Court
- In office 1996–2011

Personal details
- Born: 16 July 1949 (age 76) Jammu and Kashmir
- Education: B.Sc, LL.B
- Occupation: Judge, author

Hakim Imtiyaz Hussain (born 16 July 1949) is a former judge of the Jammu and Kashmir High Court and a former member of the State Accountability Commission. He also served as Chairman, Fee Fixation Committee for private schools in the State of Jammu and Kashmir.

== List of books written by Justice Hakim Imtiyaz Hussain ==
- Muslim Law and Customs
- Agrarian Reforms Act with Comments & Case Law
- Kashmir mein Zari Islahat (Urdu) (trans. "Agricultural Reforms in Kahmir")
- Service Law in Jammu and Kashmir
- Financial Rules and Regulations
- Pay Rules Made Easy
- Land Laws in Jammu and Kashmir
- Supreme Court and High Court Judges Conditions of Service
- The Shias of Jammu and Kashmir (English)
- Tareekh e Shaiyan Jammu wa Kashmir (Urdu)
- Azadari Hazrat Imam Hussain (Urdu)
