= Nisar Ahmad Kakru =

Nisar Ahmad Kakru (born 26 October 1949 Baramulla, Kashmir, India) is a retired Chief Justice of the High Court of Andhra Pradesh, India, serving from 19 February 2010 to 26 October 2011.

== Career ==
Kakru was enrolled as a pleader in August 1975, as a vakil in February 1979 and as an advocate in April 1982.

== Practice ==
Initially from August 1975, he practised at Baramulla district and sessions courts and other courts. He was appointed public prosecutor in the district and sessions court of Baramulla in 1978 and resigned in 1981 due to the order issued by Government of Jammu and Kashmir, debarring the public prosecutors of the state from their private practice, and continued his private practice at Baramulla until 1984. Later, he started practice at Jammu and Kashmir High Court in 1984 in civil, criminal, constitutional, service, labour, revenue and company matters.

In February 1988 he was appointed a chief government advocate and additional advocate general at Jammu and Kashmir High Court by the Government of Jammu and Kashmir and resigned in 1990, as the state government ceased to be in power due to imposition of the governor’s rule in the state. He continued his private practice until 1996, when he was again appointed an advocate general until he was promoted to the bench of the High Court of Jammu and Kashmir in November 1997.

During his practice as an advocate general, occasionally Nisar Ahmad was appointed Acting Chief Justice of Jammu and Kashmir from (April 2007 – June 2007), (November 2007 – January 2008) and (October 2008 – January 2009). On 16 February 2010, he was appointed Chief Justice of the High Court of Andhra Pradesh following a Supreme Court recommendation, which was approved by the President of India.

On 19 February 2010, governor of Andhra Pradesh, E. S. L. Narasimhan administered oath of office to Kakru at Raj Bhavan in the presence of Chief Minister K Rosaiah and Assembly Speaker N Kiran Kumar Reddy.

He retired upon attaining superannuation as the Chief Justice of the Andhra Pradesh High Court, Hyderabad on 26 October 2011.

== Judgments ==
During his stint as the Acting Chief Justice of Jammu and Kashmir High Court, reorganisation of services of High Court staff took place. As executive chairman of the Jammu and Kashmir Legal Services Authority, Justice Nisar Ahmed played a key role in conducting about 1800 Lok Adalats in which about 70,000 cases have been settled.

Nisar Ahmed's landmark judgments during his tenure as a judge of the Jammu and Kashmir High Court included the judgment holding of migrants from Doda and Poonch districts who have to be treated on par with migrants of Kashmir province.

== See also ==
High Court of Andhra Pradesh
Jammu and Kashmir High Court
