= High Court of Jammu & Kashmir and Ladakh =

Court of Indian-administered territories

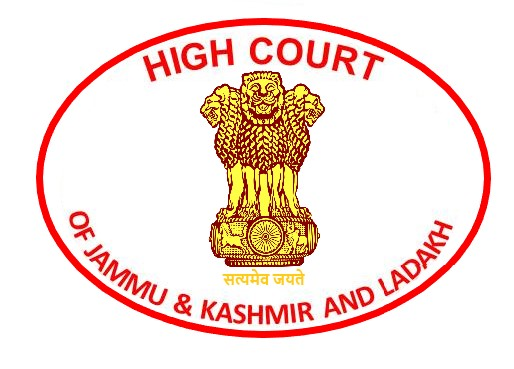
- Logo of High Court of Jammu & Kashmir and Ladakh
- Established: 26 March 1928; 98 years ago
- Jurisdiction: Jammu and Kashmir and Ladakh
- Location: Principal Seat: Srinagar Wing (Summer) and Jammu Wing (Winter); Permanent Bench: Ladakh
- Composition method: Presidential with confirmation of Chief Justice of India and governor of respective state
- Authorised by: Constitution of India
- Appeals to: Supreme Court of India
- Judge term length: Mandatory retirement at the age of 62
- Number of positions: 25 (19 Permanent Judges and 6 Additional Judges)
- Website: jkhighcourt.nic.in

Chief Justice
- Currently: Pushpendra Singh Bhati
- Since: 9 September 2026

The High Court of Jammu & Kashmir and Ladakh is the common high court for union territories of Jammu and Kashmir and Ladakh. It was established as the High Court of Jammu and Kashmir on 26 March 1928 by the Maharaja of Jammu and Kashmir.

== History ==
The High Court of Jammu and Kashmir was established by Order No. 1, issued by Maharaja Hari Singh on 26 March 1928. The Maharaja appointed Lala Kanwar Sain as the first chief justice, and Lala Bodh Raj Sawhney and Khan Sahib Aga Syed Hussain as puisne judges. The High Court sat at both the winter capital of Jammu, and the summer capital of Srinagar. The Maharaja conferred letters patent on the High Court on 10 September 1943.

Puisne judge Khan Sahib Aga Syed Hussain was the first Muslim judge of the High Court. He retired as Home and Judicial Minister of Jammu and Kashmir during the Maharaja's rule.

In August 2018, the High Court got its first and second woman judges with Justice Sindhu Sharma, who was appointed a judge, and Justice Gita Mittal, who was appointed the chief justice.

In August 2019, a Reorganisation Bill was passed by both houses of the Indian Parliament. This bill reorganised the state of Jammu and Kashmir into two union territories—Jammu and Kashmir and Ladakh—as of 31 October 2019. After this reorganisation, the High Court of Jammu and Kashmir continued serving as the High Court of Jammu and Kashmir and Ladakh for both union territories.

== Seat and benches ==
The seat of the court shifts between the summer capital Srinagar and winter capital Jammu.

=== Ladakh Bench ===
In August 2026, the Union Cabinet approved the establishment of a bench of the High Court in Ladakh, intended to improve access to justice in the Union territory.

== Chief justice and judges ==
The high court has a sanctioned judge strength of 17, out of whom 13 are permanent judges, and 4 are additional judges. Justice Sanjeev Kumar is currently serving as the Acting Chief Justice of the high court since 2 June, 2026.

== List of chief justices ==
List of former chief justices
#	Portrait	Chief Justice	Term
1		Lala Kanwar Sain	27 April 1928–16 February 1931
2		Birjor Dalal	16 February 1931–24 November 1936
3		Abdul Qayoom	24 November 1936–20 July 1940
4		Rachpal Singh	13 August 1940–6 March 1942
5		Ganga Nath	24 June 1942–23 October 1945
6		Sarat Kumar Ghosh	29 March 1946–29 March 1948
7		Janki Nath Wazir	30 March 1948–2 December 1967
8		Syed Murtaza Fazl Ali	3 December 1967–1 April 1975
9		Raja Jaswant Singh	2 April 1975–23 January 1976
10		Muhammed Rafeeudin Ahmed Ansari	23 January 1976–8 November 1977
11		Mian Jalal-ud-Din	15 February 1978–22 February 1980
12		Mufti Baha-ud-Din	7 March 1983–23 August 1983
13		Vazhakkulangarayil Khalid	24 August 1983–24 June 1984
14	A. S. Anand	Adarsh Sein Anand	11 May 1985–23 October 1989
15		Sukhdev Singh Kang	24 October 1989–14 May 1993
16		Satish Chandra Mathur	10 October 1993–17 March 1994
17		Saiyed Saghir Ahmad	18 March 1994–22 September 1994
18		Muniyallapa Ramakrishna	10 October 1994–15 June 1997
19		Bhawani Singh	16 June 1997–21 February 2000
20		Bhagwati Prasad Saraf	21 February 2000–22 August 2001
21		Hotoi Khetoho Sema	12 September 2001–8 April 2002
22		Babulal Chandulal Patel	16 May 2002–4 March 2003
23		Sachchidanand Jha	4 February 2004–11 October 2005
24		Bashir Ahmed Khan	25 January 2007–31 March 2007
25		Kalavamkodath Sivasankara Panicker Radhakrishnan	7 January 2008–28 August 2008
26		Manmohan Sarin	4 September 2008–19 October 2008
27		Barin Ghosh	3 January 2009–13 April 2010
28		Aftab Hussain Saikia	13 April 2010–6 April 2011
29		Fakir Mohamed Ibrahim Kalifulla	24 February 2011–2 April 2012
Acting		Virender Singh	2 April 2012–7 June 2012
30		Mahesh Mittal Kumar	8 June 2012 – 4 January 2015
31		N. Paul Vasanthakumar	2 February 2015 – 14 March 2017
Acting		Ramalingam Sudhakar	15 March 2017 – 31 March 2017
32		Badar Durrez Ahmed	1 April 2017 – 15 March 2018
Acting		Ramalingam Sudhakar	16 March 2018 – 11 May 2018
Acting		Alok Aradhe	11 May 2018 – 11 August 2018
33		Gita Mittal	11 August 2018 – 8 December 2020
Acting		Rajesh Bindal	9 December 2020 – 3 January 2021
34		Pankaj Mithal	4 January 2021 – 12 October 2022
35		Ali Mohammad Magrey	13 October 2022 – 7 December 2022
Acting		Tashi Rabstan	8 December 2022 – 14 February 2023
36		Nongmeikapam Kotiswar Singh	15 February 2023 – 17 July 2024
Acting		Tashi Rabstan	18 July 2024 – 26 September 2024
37		Tashi Rabstan	27 September 2024 – 9 April 2025
Acting		Sanjeev Kumar	10 April 2025 – 15 April 2025
38		Arun Palli	16 April 2025 – 1 June 2026
Acting		Sanjeev Kumar	2 June 2026 – 8 September 2026
39		Pushpendra Singh Bhati	9 September 2026 – Incumbent

== Judges elevated as Chief Justices ==
This sections contains list of only those judges elevated as chief justices whose parent high court is Jammu & Kashmir. This includes those judges who, at the time of appointment as chief justice, may not be serving in Jammu & Kashmir High Court but this list does not include judges who at the time of appointment as chief justice were serving in Jammu & Kashmir High Court but does not have Jammu & Kashmir as their Parent High Court.

Colour Key

- Female Chief Justice
- Served as Chief Justice of India

Symbol Key

- ^{‡} Elevated to Supreme Court of India
- ^{RES} Resigned
- ^{†} Died in office

Name	Image	Appointed as CJ in HC of	Date of appointment		Date of retirement (Note: this includes date of resignation, death and elevation to supreme court)	Tenure		Ref..
Name	Image	Appointed as CJ in HC of	As Judge	As Chief Justice	Date of retirement	As Chief Justice	As Judge (Note: also includes tenure as Chief Justice)	Ref..
Janki Nath Wazir		Jammu & Kashmir	1937	30 March 1948	2 December 1967	19 years, 248 days		
Syed Murtaza Fazl Ali		Jammu & Kashmir	9 April 1958	3 December 1967	1 April 1975^{[‡]}	7 years, 120 days	16 years, 358 days	
Raja Jaswant Singh		Jammu & Kashmir	3 December 1967	2 April 1975	22 January 1976^{[‡]}	296 days	8 years, 51 days	
Mian Jalal-ud-Din		Jammu & Kashmir	10 July 1968	15 February 1978	22 February 1980	2 years, 8 days	11 years, 228 days	
Mufti Baha-ud-Din		Jammu & Kashmir	27 August 1971	7 March 1983	23 August 1983^{[RES]}	170 days	11 years, 362 days	
Adarsh Sein Anand		Jammu & Kashmir, transferred to Madras	26 May 1975	11 May 1985	17 November 1991^{[‡]}	6 years, 191 days	16 years, 176 days	
Ram Prakash Sethi		Karnataka	30 May 1986	29 June 1996	6 January 1999^{[‡]}	2 years, 192 days	12 years, 222 days	
Vinod Kumar Gupta		Jharkhand, transferred to Himachal Pradesh then to Uttarakhand	7 November 1990	5 December 2000	9 September 2009	8 years, 279 days	18 years, 307 days	
Bashir Ahmed Khan		Jammu & Kashmir	12 November 1990	25 January 2007	31 March 2007	66 days	16 years, 140 days	
Tirath Singh Thakur		Punjab & Haryana	16 February 1994	11 August 2008	16 November 2009^{[‡]}	1 year, 98 days	15 years, 274 days	
Bilal Nazki		Orissa	6 January 1995	14 November 2009	17 November 2009	4 days	14 years, 316 days	
Nisar Ahmad Kakru		Andhra Pradesh	26 November 1997	19 February 2010	25 October 2011	1 year, 249 days	13 years, 334 days	
Permod Kohli		Sikkim	7 January 2003	12 December 2011	28 February 2013	1 year, 79 days	10 years, 53 days	
Mansoor Ahmad Mir		Himachal Pradesh	31 January 2005	18 June 2014	24 April 2017	2 years, 311 days	12 years, 84 days	
Mohammad Yaqoob Mir		Meghalaya	23 November 2007	21 May 2018	27 May 2019	1 year, 7 days	11 years, 186 days	
Ali Mohammad Magrey		Jammu & Kashmir	8 March 2013	12 October 2022	7 December 2022	57 days	9 years, 275 days	
Dhiraj Singh Thakur		Andhra Pradesh	8 March 2013	28 July 2023	24 April 2026	2 years, 271 days	13 years, 48 days	
Tashi Rabstan		Jammu & Kashmir	8 March 2013	27 September 2024	9 April 2025	195 days	12 years, 33 days	

=== Judges appointed as Acting Chief Justice ===
Name	Appointed as ACJ in HC of	Date of appointment as Judge	Period as Acting Chief Justice	Date of retirement	Tenure as ACJ	Tenure as Judge	Remarks	Ref..
Mian Jalal-ud-Din	Jammu & Kashmir	10 July 1968	9 Nov 1977 – 14 Feb 1978	22 February 1980	98 days	11 years, 228 days	Became permanent	
Mufti Baha-ud-Din	Jammu & Kashmir	27 August 1971	23 Feb 1980 – 6 Mar 1983	23 August 1983^{[RES]}	3 years, 12 days	11 years, 362 days	Became permanent	
A. S. Anand	Jammu & Kashmir	26 May 1975	25 Jun 1984 – 10 May 1985	17 November 1991^{[‡]}	320 days	16 years, 176 days	Became permanent	
S. M. Rizvi	Jammu & Kashmir	30 May 1984	15 May 1993 – 9 Oct 1993	28 June 1995	148 days	11 years, 30 days	--	
S. M. Rizvi	Jammu & Kashmir	30 May 1984	23 Sep 1994 – 9 Oct 1994	28 June 1995	17 days	11 years, 30 days	--	
R. P. Sethi	Punjab & Haryana	30 May 1986	27 Mar 1996 – 27 Jun 1996	6 January 1999^{[‡]}	93 days	12 years, 222 days	Elevated as CJ of Karnataka	
V. K. Gupta	Jharkhand	7 November 1990	15 Nov 2000 – 4 Dec 2000	9 September 2009	20 days	18 years, 307 days	Became permanent	
Bashir Ahmed Khan	Delhi	12 November 1990	8 Aug 2005 – 11 Oct 2005	31 March 2007	65 days	16 years, 140 days	Transferred to Jammu & Kashmir	
Bashir Ahmed Khan	Jammu & Kashmir	12 November 1990	12 Oct 2005 – 24 Jan 2007	31 March 2007	1 year, 105 days	16 years, 140 days	Became permanent	
T. S. Thakur	Delhi	16 February 1994	9 Apr 2008 – 10 May 2008	16 November 2009^{[‡]}	32 days	15 years, 274 days	--	
Bilal Nazki	Andhra Pradesh	6 January 1995	4 Apr 2005 – 26 Nov 2005	17 November 2009	237 days	14 years, 316 days	--	
Bilal Nazki	Andhra Pradesh	6 January 1995	12 Nov 2007 – 6 Jan 2008	17 November 2009	56 days	14 years, 316 days	Transferred to Bombay	
Rattan Chand Gandhi	Rajasthan	6 January 1995	1 Feb 2009 – 5 Mar 2009	21 January 2010	33 days	15 years, 16 days	--	
Rattan Chand Gandhi	Rajasthan	6 January 1995	11 May 2009 – 9 Aug 2009	21 January 2010	91 days	15 years, 16 days	--	
N. A. Kakru	Jammu & Kashmir	26 November 1997	1 Apr 2007 – 5 Jun 2007	25 October 2011	66 days	13 years, 334 days	--	
N. A. Kakru	Jammu & Kashmir	26 November 1997	12 Nov 2007 – 6 Jan 2008	25 October 2011	56 days	13 years, 334 days	--	
N. A. Kakru	Jammu & Kashmir	26 November 1997	20 Oct 2008 – 2 Jan 2009	25 October 2011	75 days	13 years, 334 days	--	
M. A. Mir	Himachal Pradesh	31 January 2005	27 Nov 2013 – 17 Jun 2014	24 April 2017	203 days	12 years, 84 days	Became permanent	
M. Y. Mir	Jammu & Kashmir	23 November 2007	5 Jan 2015 – 2 Feb 2015	27 May 2019	29 days	11 years, 186 days	--	
Tashi Rabstan	Jammu & Kashmir	8 March 2013	8 Dec 2022 – 14 Feb 2023	9 April 2025	69 days	12 years, 33 days	--	
Tashi Rabstan	Jammu & Kashmir	8 March 2013	18 Jul 2024 – 26 Sep 2024	9 April 2025	71 days	12 years, 33 days	Became permanent	
Sanjeev Kumar	Jammu & Kashmir	6 June 2017	10 Apr 2025 – 15 Apr 2025	Incumbent	6 days	9 years, 138 days	--	
Sanjeev Kumar	Jammu & Kashmir	6 June 2017	2 Jun 2026 – 8 Sep 2026	Incumbent	99 days	9 years, 138 days	--	

== Judges elevated to Supreme Court ==
This section includes the list of only those judges whose parent high court was Jammu & Kashmir. This includes those judges who, at the time of elevation to Supreme Court of India, may not be serving in Jammu & Kashmir High Court but this list does not include judges who at the time of elevation were serving in Jammu & Kashmir High Court but does not have Jammu & Kashmir as their Parent High Court.

Colour Key

- Female Judge
- Served as Chief Justice of India

Key

- ^{RES} Resigned
- ^{†} Died in office

#	Name of the Judge	Image	Date of Appointment		Date of Retirement	Tenure			Immediately preceding office
#	Name of the Judge	Image	In Parent High Court	In Supreme Court	Date of Retirement	In High Court(s)	In Supreme Court	Total tenure (Note: Includes both tenure as High Court Judge as well as Supreme Court Judge)	Immediately preceding office
1	Syed Murtaza Fazl Ali		9 April 1958	2 April 1975	20 August 1985^{[†]}	16 years, 358 days	10 years, 141 days	27 years, 134 days	8th CJ of Jammu & Kashmir HC
2	Raja Jaswant Singh		3 December 1967	23 January 1976	24 January 1979	8 years, 51 days	3 years, 2 days	11 years, 53 days	9th CJ of Jammu & Kashmir HC
3	Adarsh Sein Anand		26 May 1975	18 November 1991	31 October 2001	16 years, 176 days	9 years, 348 days	26 years, 159 days	24th CJ of Madras HC
4	Ram Prakash Sethi		30 May 1986	8 January 1999	6 July 2002	12 years, 222 days	3 years, 180 days	16 years, 38 days	18th CJ of Karnataka HC
5	Tirath Singh Thakur		16 February 1994	17 November 2009	3 January 2017	15 years, 274 days	7 years, 47 days	22 years, 323 days	28th CJ of Punjab & Haryana HC

== Notable people ==
- Hakim Imtiyaz Hussain (born 1949), former Jammu and Kashmir High Court judge

== Jammu and Kashmir State Judicial Academy ==
In 2001, the High Court established its regular Judicial Academy via order No. 342, dated 26 July. Since then, Jammu and Kashmir State Judicial Academy functions regularly and holds training programmes. Jammu and Kashmir State Judicial Academy has its own infrastructure in Jammu (in the premises of the High Court) and in Srinagar (Mominabad).

The administrative machinery of High Court of Jammu and Kashmir and Ladakh moves to Srinagar, its summer capital, in April and Jammu, its winter capital, in November every year. In view of this tradition, Jammu and Kashmir State Judicial Academy also functions likewise from Jammu and Srinagar. It has infrastructures both in Jammu and Srinagar.
