= Himachal Pradesh State Electricity Board =

Indian electrical contractor

Himachal Pradesh State Electricity Board Limited
- Native name: विद्युत भवन
- Company type: Public Sector Company
- Industry: Electricity generation, transmission, distribution
- Founded: 1 September 1971
- Headquarters: Annadale Road, Kumar House, Shimla, Himachal Pradesh, India
- Area served: Himachal Pradesh
- Key people: Chairman - Shri Prabodh Saxena (IAS) Managing Director - Er. Sandeep Kumar
- Products: Electricity Distribution
- Website: https://www.hpseb.in

Himachal Pradesh State Electricity Board Limited (HPSEBL) is a (state government undertaking) electricity board operating within the state of Himachal Pradesh, India, that generates and supplies power through a network of transmission, sub- transmission, and distribution lines. Himachal Pradesh State Electricity Board which was constituted on 1 September 1971 in accordance with the provisions of Electricity Supply Act (1948) and has been reorganized as Himachal Pradesh State Electricity Board Limited from 2010 under company act 1956.

== Restructuring ==
The Himachal Pradesh State Electricity Board has been re-organized as Himachal Pradesh State Electricity Board Ltd. w.e.f. 14.06.2010 under Company Act.1956.

== Functions ==
HPSEBL is responsible for the supply of Uninterrupted & Quality power to all consumers in Himachal Pradesh. Power is being supplied through a network of Transmission, Sub-Transmission & Distribution lines laid in the state. Since its inception, Board has made long strides in executing the targets entrusted to it

== Himachal Pradesh Area Load Despatch Centre (HPALDC) ==
Himachal Pradesh Area Load Despatch Center has been established to ensure integrated operation of the power system of HPSEBL with the Northern Region Load Dispatch Center of India to Monitor system parameters and security, System studies, planning and contingency analysis, Analysis of tripping and facilitating remedial measures, Daily scheduling and operational planning, Facilitating bilateral exchanges, Computation of energy dispatch and drawal values using SEMs, Augmentation of telemetry, computing and communication facilities.

== Generation ==
PROJECTS UNDER OPERATION
Sr. No.	Name of Project	Name of Basin	Installed capacity(MW)
A.	STATE SECTOR:		
1	Andhra	Yamuna	16.95
2	Giri	Yamuna	60.00
3.	Gumma	Yamuna	3.00
4.	Rukti	Satluj	1.50
5.	Chaba	Satluj	1.75
6.	Rongtong	Satluj	2.00
7.	Nogli	Satluj	2.50
8.	Bhaba	Satluj	120.00
9.	Ganvi	Satluj	22.50
10.	Binwa	Beas	6.00
11.	Gaj	Beas	10.50
12.	Baner	Beas	12.00
13.	Uhl-II (Bassi)	Beas	60.00
14.	Larji	Beas	126.00
15.	Khauli	Beas	12.00
16.	Sal-II	Ravi	2.00
17.	Holi	Ravi	3.00
18	Bhuri Singh P/House	Ravi	0.45
19	Killar	Ravi	0.30
20	Thirot	Ravi	4.50
	Total		466.95

== Notable Achievements ==
- Himachal Pradesh achieved 100 percent Electrification in to all its census villages in the year 1988.
- Ensured 24 x 7 uninterrupted Power Supply.
- Himachal Pradesh has the honor of providing electricity at lowest tariff in the country.
- Himachal Pradesh achieved unique distinction of 100% metering, billing and collection.
- Achieved highest household/consumer coverage ratio in the country i.e. about 98% as per REC's survey & they have been adjudged one of the best Board's in the country.
- Installed and commissioned a power house at the highest altitude in the world (Rongtong Power House at an altitude of approx. 12,000 ft.).
- Installed and commissioned a totally underground power House which is unique in Asia (Bhaba Power House – 120 MW).
- Introduced Hassle-free online Utility Bill Payments Systems.
- Started 128-bit SSL encryption – secure e-commerce systems.
- Ensured safe and timely Energy bills payments using Credit/Debit cards or Net-banking
