= Ali Mohammad Magrey =

Former Chief Justice of Jammu & Kashmir and Ladakh High Court

Hon'ble Chief Justice (Retd.) Ali Mohammad Magrey

Chief Justice of Jammu & Kashmir and Ladakh High Court
- In office 13 October 2022 – 7 December 2022
- Nominated by: Uday Umesh Lalit
- Appointed by: Droupadi Murmu

Judge of Jammu & Kashmir and Ladakh High Court
- In office 8 March 2013 – 12 October 2022
- Nominated by: Altamas Kabir
- Appointed by: Pranab Mukherjee

Personal details
- Born: 8 December 1960 (age 65) Wattoo, Kashmir
- Education: University of Kashmir

Ali Mohammad Magrey (born 8 December 1958) is an Indian judge. He is former Chief Justice of the Jammu & Kashmir and Ladakh High Court. Previously, he has also served as Judge of the same court.

== Career ==
Magrey was born on 8 December 1960 in the village of Wattoo in Kulgam district, Kashmir. He graduated from the University of Kashmir with a LL.B (Hon's). In 1984, he enrolled as an Advocate and started his practice in District Courts. In February 2003, he was appointed as Additional Advocate General. In September 2009, he was appointed as Senior Additional Advocate General. On 8 March 2013, he was appointed as a Judge of Jammu & Kashmir and Ladakh High Court. He was elevated as Chief Justice of the Jammu & Kashmir and Ladakh High Court on 13 October 2022. He retired on 7 December 2022.
