= N. Paul Vasanthakumar =

Indian former judge

Narayanan Nadar Paul Vasanthakumar

32nd Chief Justice Jammu and Kashmir High Court
- In office 2 February 2015 – 14 March 2017
- Preceded by: M. M. Kumar
- Succeeded by: Badar Durrez Ahmed

Judge Madras High Court
- In office 20 April 2007 – 1 February 2015

Additional Judge Madras High Court
- In office 10 December 2005 – 19 April 2007

Personal details
- Born: 15 March 1955 (age 71) Palliyadi (Travancore-Cochin State), present-day Kanniyakumari district, Tamil Nadu, India

Narayanan Nadar Paul Vasanthakumar (born 15 March 1955) is from Palliyadi, Kanyakumari District of Tamil Nadu, India and was the Chief Justice of the Jammu and Kashmir High Court. He retired on 14 March 2017. He was appointed an additional judge of High Court of Madras in December 2005 and permanent judge on 20 April 2007. He took oath as the chief justice of the High Court of Jammu and Kashmir in February 2015.

== Career ==
He was enrolled as an Advocate in the year 1980 and was Junior to Late Mr. T. Martin. He was given an honorary post of member in Ecclesiastical Synod Courts, C.S.I. Specialist in Service Law, Labor Law and Education matters. He held the post of Senior Standing Counsel for Tamil Nadu Public Service Commission and also Standing Counsel for Central Government. In 2005, he was appointed Additional Judge of High Court of Madras and in 2007 Permanent Judge. During his term in the High Court of Madras, he delivered judgements on several important legal issues.

== Notable Judgments ==
Some important judgements pronounced by Justice Vasanthakumar include statutory prohibition for failing a student and retaining (him) in the same standard, refusing permission for granite quarrying in hilly areas, and making it compulsory for banks to provide loans to students for educational purposes.
