= Vazhakkulangarayil Khalid =

Indian judge (1922-2017)

Vazhakkulangarayil Khalid (1 July 1922 — 15 November 2017) was a former judge of the Supreme Court of India and acting Governor of the State of Jammu and Kashmir.

== Career ==
Khalid studied at Municipal High School of Kannur, Government Brennen College, Thalassery and Presidency College, Madras. He passed Law from the Law College, Madras. After the enrollment he started his lawyer career at Kannur Munsiff court initially then moved to the Madras High Court and Kerala High Court in 1948. He worked on Criminal, Civil and constitutional matters. On 7 March 1974, Khalid was appointed an additional judge of Kerala High Court. He was elevated in the post of the Chief Justice of Jammu and Kashmir High Court on 24 August 1983. In 1984 he served as an acting Governor of Jammu and Kashmir for 12 days. On 25 June 1984 he was appointed a judge of the Supreme Court of India and retired on 30 June 1987 from the post. Justice Khalid was known for his judgement in Shah Bano Begum case. He died aged 95 on 15 November 2017.
