= Dipak Misra =

45th Chief Justice of India

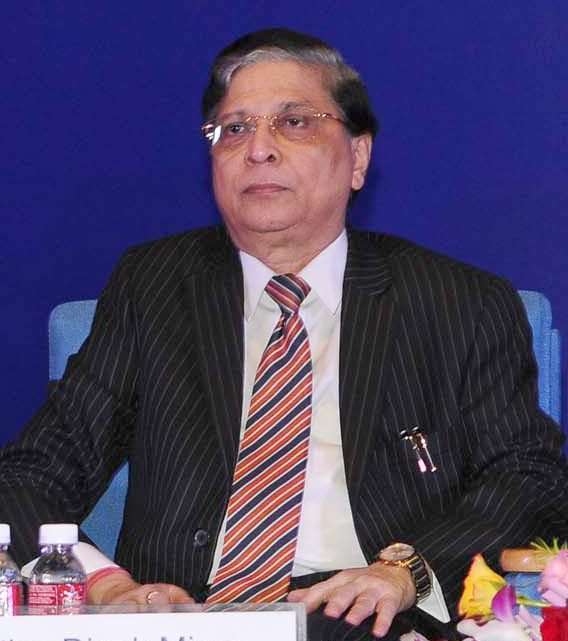
- Misra in 2017

45th Chief Justice of India
- In office 28 August 2017 – 2 October 2018
- Appointed by: Ram Nath Kovind
- Preceded by: Jagdish Singh Khehar
- Succeeded by: Ranjan Gogoi

Judge of the Supreme Court of India
- In office 10 October 2011 – 28 August 2017
- Nominated by: S. H. Kapadia
- Appointed by: Pratibha Patil

26th Chief Justice of the Delhi High Court
- In office 24 May 2010 – 9 October 2011
- Nominated by: K. G. Balakrishnan
- Appointed by: Pratibha Patil
- Preceded by: Ajit Prakash Shah
- Succeeded by: D. Murugesan

36th Chief Justice of the Patna High Court
- In office 1 December 2009 – 23 May 2010
- Nominated by: K. G. Balakrishnan
- Appointed by: Pratibha Patil
- Preceded by: Prafulla Kumar Mishra
- Succeeded by: Rekha Manharlal Doshit

Judge of the Madhya Pradesh High Court
- In office 3 March 1997 – 30 November 2009
- Nominated by: A. M. Ahmadi
- Appointed by: Shankar Dayal Sharma

Judge of the Orissa High Court
- In office 17 January 1996 – 2 March 1997
- Nominated by: A. M. Ahmadi
- Appointed by: Shankar Dayal Sharma

Personal details
- Born: 3 October 1953 (age 73)
- Relatives: Ranganath Misra (uncle)
- Education: Madhusudan Law College, Cuttack

Dipak Misra (born 3 October 1953) is an Indian jurist who served as the 45th Chief Justice of India from 28 August 2017 till 2 October 2018. He is also a former Chief Justice of the Patna High Court and Delhi High Court. He is the nephew of Justice Ranganath Misra, the 21st Chief Justice of India from 1990 to 1991.

== Career ==
Misra being sworn in as the Chief Justice of the Supreme Court of India

Misra enrolled at the Bar on 14 February 1977 and practised at the Orissa High Court and the Service Tribunal. He was first appointed an Additional Judge of the Orissa High Court in 1996. The following year, he was transferred to the Madhya Pradesh High Court, where he was made a Permanent Judge on 19 December 1997. In December 2009, he was appointed Chief Justice of the Patna High Court, serving until May 2010, when he was appointed Chief Justice of the Delhi High Court. He was elevated to the Supreme Court on 10 October 2011.

Misra had a tenure of thirteen months as chief justice at the Supreme Court after being appointed the 45th Chief Justice of India on 28 August 2017 until mandatory retirement at 65 years of age, on 2 October 2018 and was succeeded by Ranjan Gogoi. Justice Misra has been awarded the prestigious Kalinga Ratna Samman by Sarala Sahitya Sansad, Odisha on 6 September 2026

== Notable judgements ==
=== First Information Report ===
Misra's judgement in the Own Motion vs State case, requiring Delhi Police to upload First Information Reports (FIR) on their website within 24 hours of the FIRs being lodged. This enables the accused to file appropriate applications before the court for redressal of their grievances.

=== Reservation in promotion ===
In a case on Reservation in promotion, Justice Misra and Justice Dalveer Bhandari upheld the Allahabad High Court judgement that reservation in promotions can be provided only if there is sufficient data and evidence to justify the need. The bench rejected the Uttar Pradesh government's decision to provide reservation in promotion on the ground that it failed to furnish sufficient valid data.

=== Yakub Memon's appeal ===
In an unprecedented overnight hearing at 3:20 am IST on 30 July 2015, a 3 judge bench comprising Dipak Misra, Prafulla Chandra Pant and Amitava Roy rejected 1993 Mumbai serial blasts convict Yakub Memon's appeal to stop his execution which resulted in his hanging at the Nagpur Central Jail a few hours later.

Memon's lawyers made a last-minute effort to save him from the noose by rushing to the residence of Chief Justice H. L. Dattu to petition for an urgent hearing, after Memon's mercy pleas were rejected by Governor of Maharashtra C. Vidyasagar Rao and then by President Pranab Mukherjee. However, the Supreme Court dismissed the case and the three-judge bench refused to stay the execution, stating that Memon had been provided with sufficient opportunities before the court and the executive. The bench further stated, "if we have to stay the death warrant it would be a travesty of justice", adding that "we do not find any merit in the writ petition".

=== Nirbhaya rape case ===
A three judge bench led by Justice Misra has upheld the death sentence awarded to the four convicts of the Nirbhaya rape case on 5 May 2017. Justice Misra authored the landmark judgement confirming the death penalty of four convicts in the brutal 2012 Delhi gang rape and murder case which shook the nation and spurred the genesis of a stringent anti-rape law. In his verdict, Justice Misra termed the convicts as those who “found an object for enjoyment in her... for their gross, sadistic and beastly pleasures... for the devilish manner in which they played with her dignity and identity is humanly inconceivable”.

=== Cauvery river ===
It was a bench of the Supreme Court headed by Justice Misra that settled the 120 year old dispute over the Cauvery river, also called the Ganga of the South and considered to be the lifeline for Tamil Nadu and Karnataka. The judgement laid down important principles to the effect that rivers are a national resource and not the property of any State and the sharing of waters must be on equitable basis and further placed the requirement of drinking water at the highest pedestal.

=== Progress in Ayodhya case ===
The first progress in the Ayodhya dispute occurred during Justice Misra’s tenure when the Bench led by him restricted the dispute only to the title suit and rejected third party interventions. The Bench led by him rejected the plea to refer the ''Ismail Faruqui'' judgement to a Constitution Bench thereby upholding that a mosque was not integral to the Muslim way of worship, which has an important bearing on the dispute.

=== Section 377 IPC ===
In a historic unanimous ruling on Section 377 IPC, while presiding over a Constitution Bench, Chief Justice Misra partially struck down Section 377 of IPC citing it to be irrational, indefensible and manifestly arbitrary. Justice Misra observed quoting Goethe : “I am what I am, so take me as I am” and emphasised on the universal concepts of individuality, liberty and dignity of the individual, right to privacy, equality of rights and freedom of expression, and highlighted the constitutional principles of transformative constitutionalism and constitutional morality and the doctrines of progressive realisation and non-retrogression of rights.

=== Freedom of speech and expression ===
In Subramanian Swamy v. Union of India, a two judge bench of the Supreme Court of India, which included Misra and Justice Prafulla C Pant, has upheld that defamation is a criminal offence. Many have seen the verdict as a blow to freedom of speech and expression in India. Herein, the bench concluded that the Right to Reputation is included under Article 21 of the Indian Constitution. The court also referred to Dr. B. R. Ambedkar's speech to highlight the intention of the drafters to include reasonable restrictions on free speech and expression under Article 19(2), without defining words such as "defamation" and clearly left it for the wisdom of the courts to interpret and apply their meaning.

To determine the constitutionality of Section 499 of the Indian Penal Code and its exceptions, the bench examined each provision in detail and concluded that the section is not vague. The bench rejected the petitioner's argument about "public good", stating that such interpretation must be made on a case-by-case basis. Ultimately, the court found Section 499 of the Indian Penal Code and Section 199 of the CrPC constitutional, asserting that the judiciary is independent of political influence and responsible for preventing the misuse of the judicial process.

=== Right to marry by one's choice ===
While upholding the marriage of Kerala Muslim convert girl Hadiya with Shafin Jahan in the Hadiya court case, he observed that the right to marry a person of one's choice is integral to right to life and liberty and further, choosing a faith is the substratum of individuality and sans it, the right of choice becomes a shadow.

=== Honour killing ===
In Shakti Vahini v. Union of India, deprecating honour killing and honour crimes, Justice Misra wrote that honour killing guillotines individual liberty and freedom of choice and that assertion of choice is an insegregable facet of liberty and dignity. He further wrote: “any kind of torture or torment or ill-treatment in the name of honour that tantamount to atrophy of choice of an individual relating to love and marriage by an assembly, whatsoever nomenclature it assumes, is illegal and cannot be allowed a moment of existence”. He also observed, “class honour, howsoever perceived, cannot smother the choice of an individual which he or she is entitled to enjoy under our compassionate Constitution.”

=== Mob vigilantism and lynching ===
Justice Misra, in his judgement on mob vigilantism and lynching, condemned the horrendous acts of mobocracy and observed that it cannot be allowed to become the “new normal”. He stated that it has to be curbed with an iron hand and that no citizen can be allowed to take the law into his own hands or become law unto himself and further issued a slew of directions, including preventive, punitive and remedial measures, to deal with the crime.

=== Defamation and free speech ===
He had upheld the constitutionality of the criminal defamation as a reasonable restriction on free speech under Article 19 (2) of the Constitution stating that reputation cannot be allowed to be sullied on the anvil of free speech which is not absolute.

=== Conviction of High Court Judge ===
He was also part of the Bench of the Supreme Court's seven senior-most judges who convicted then Calcutta High Court judge C. S. Karnan of contempt of court and sentenced him to six months' imprisonment.

=== National Anthem at cinema halls ===
He was part of the bench that ordered playing of the National Anthem in the beginning of a film in theatres as mandatory, which requires the audience to stand up when it is played. Later, he modified the order to clarify with regard to disabled people and further relaxed it while stating that if a cinema chose to play the National Anthem, people would have to stand up as a mark of honour and respect.

=== Adultery ===
He was part of the bench that ruled out Section 497 of the Indian Penal Code dealing with adultery. On 27 September 2018, Misra read the judgement that adultery will no longer be a criminal offence, but can serve as a reason for other civil issues, such as divorce.

=== Gender equality ===
He is hailed as a 'warrior of gender equality' as he led various constitutional benches which passed historic judgements that upheld equal rights for women and the LGBT community, like the scrapping of Section 497 of the Indian Penal Code, legalising homosexuality by partially striking down Section 377 of the Indian Penal Code and allowing entry for women of menstruating age group into the Sabarimala temple in Kerala.

== Awards and Recognition ==
Former Chief Justice of India Shri Dipak Misra has been awarded the prestigious Kalinga Ratna Samman by Sarala Sahitya Sansad, Odisha on 6 September 2026 . He was also conferred SKOCH Challenger Award for Exemplary Service to Law & Liberty in May 2022 . Justice Misra is also recipient of honorary doctorate by North Orissa University and Amity University .

== Allegations ==
On 12 January 2018, four senior judges of the Supreme Court; Jasti Chelameswar, Ranjan Gogoi, Madan Lokur and Kurian Joseph addressed a press conference criticising Misra's style of administration and allocation of cases. However, people close to Misra refuted these allegations. Legal experts like Soli Sorabjee and Ujjwal Nikam said that this rebellion of the four judges against the Chief Justice of India is going to hurt the judiciary by eroding public faith in it.

On 20 April 2018, seven opposition parties submitted a petition seeking impeachment of Misra to the Vice-President Venkaiah Naidu, with signatures from seventy-one parliamentarians. On 23 April 2018, the petition was rejected by Venkaiah Naidu, primarily on the basis that the complaints were about the internal administration and not misbehaviour, and that impeachment would seriously interfere with the constitutionally protected independence of the judiciary.

=== Self-plagiarism ===
On 8 April 2025, The Court of Appeal of Singapore set aside an international arbitration award after finding that over 200 of its 451 paragraphs were copied from two similar Indian awards "without regard to material differences in arguments, contracts or context." All three awards were overseen by former Chief Justice of India Dipak Misra.

Legal offices
Preceded by Jagdish Singh Khehar	Chief Justice of India; 2017–2018	Succeeded by Ranjan Gogoi
