= K. Surendra Mohan =

Retired judge of Kerala High Court in India

Hon'ble Justice K. Surendra Mohan
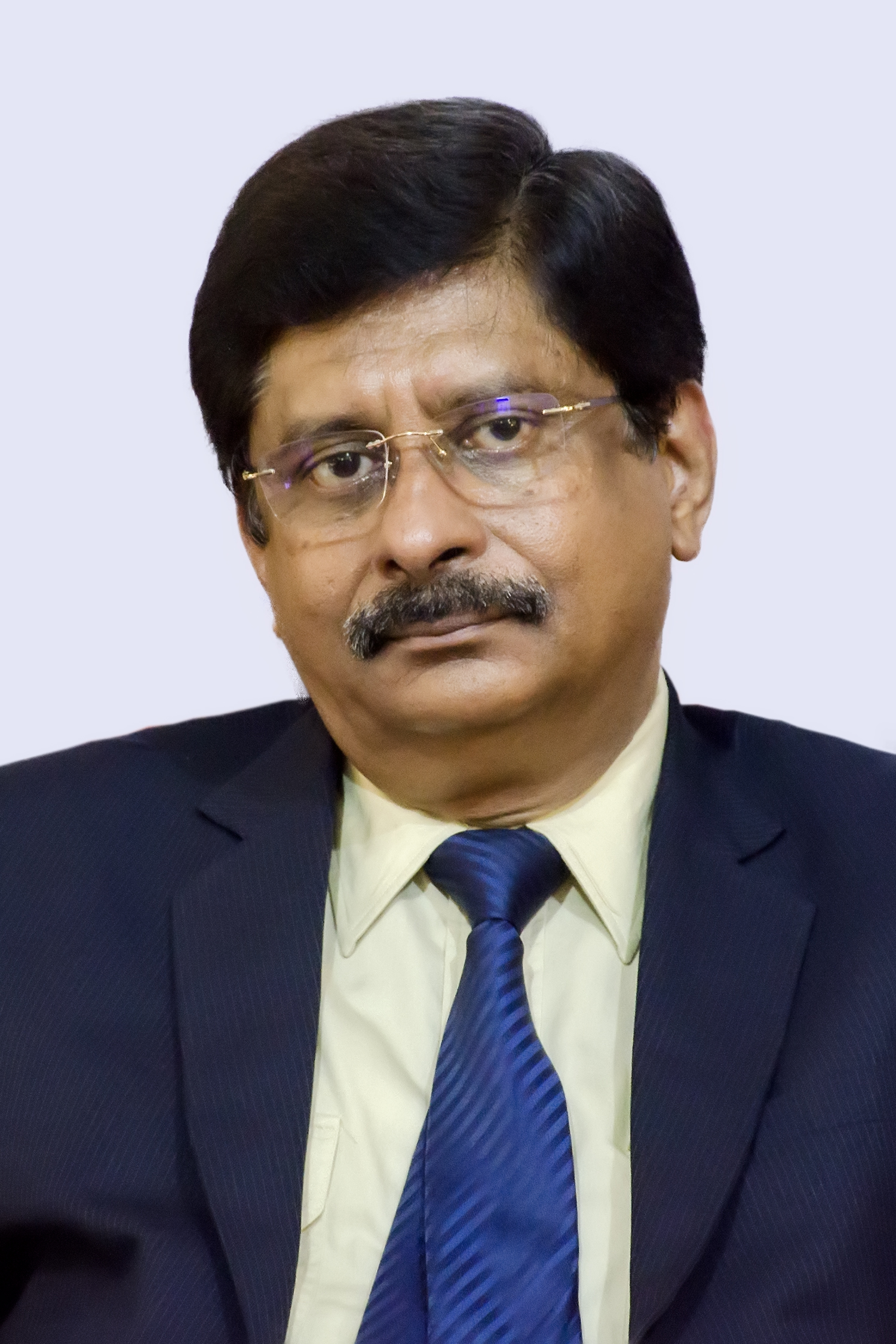

Judge of Kerala High Court
- In office 5 January 2009 – 1 March 2019

Personal details
- Born: 1 March 1957 (age 69) Kerala
- Citizenship: Indian
- Website: High Court of Kerala

Surendra Mohan Kuriakose is a former judge of the Kerala High Court, the highest court in the Indian state of Kerala and in the Union Territory of Lakshadweep. The High Court of Kerala is headquartered at Ernakulam, Kochi.

== Early life and education ==
Surendra Mohan was born on 01.03.1957. He obtained a law degree from University College of Law, Dharwad and post graduation from School of Legal Studies, Cochin University of Science & Technology.

== Career ==
Surendra Mohan was enrolled as Advocate on 12.10.1980 and started practice at Ernakulam. He elevated as Additional Judge of High Court of Kerala on 05.1.2009 became permanent from 15.12.2010 and retired from service on 01.03.2019.
