= Johnson John =

Indian judge (born 1965)

Additional Judge of the Kerala High Court
- In office 25 October 2023 – Present

Personal details
- Born: 29 April 1965 (age 61)
- Education: Cochin University of Science and Technology (LL.M.)
- Profession: Judge, Lawyer

Johnson John is an Indian judge serving a judge of the Kerala High Court since 25 October 2023.

Previously serving as an additional judge of Kerala High Court, he was appointed as a permanent judge of that high court from 1 September 2025.

== See also ==
- Kerala High Court
