= Kunjali Marakkar (disambiguation) =

Kunjali Marakkar is a historical figure of Kerala, India; an admiral during the Travancore–Dutch War.

It may also refer to:

- Kunjali Marakkar (film) ,1966 Indian Malayalam-language film about the admiral
- Kunjali Marakkar School of Marine Engineering, a Marine engineering college in Kochi, Kerala, India

== See also ==
- Marakkar, a Muslim community of India and Sri Lanka
- Marakkar: Lion of the Arabian Sea, 2020 Indian Malayalam-language film about the admiral
