= Reghunadhan Nair =

Indian polymer scientist

C. P. Reghunadhan Nair is an Indian polymer scientist who was the deputy director of the Vikram Sarabhai Space Centre (ISRO).

== Biography ==
Born at Aluva, Nair took his Masters in Applied Chemistry from Cochin University of Science and Technology in 1979 and Doctorate in Macromolecular Materials from Louis Pasteur University, Strasbourg, France in 1989. He worked at the Vikram Sarabhai Space Centre (ISRO) from 1980 in different capacities and retired as its Deputy Director in 2016. He was French Government Fellow for the period 1985-89 and CNRS visiting scientist in 1993 in France. From 2016 to 2020 he served as KSCSTE emeritus Scientist at Cochin University of Science and Technology, India. Currently he is Emeritus professor at this university.

Nair's research has been mainly in fundamental chemistry mostly related to polymer science. His areas of research include materials for space, polymer chemistry, free radical chemistry and propellants. Specially skilled in thermodynamics, he has specialized in mission-oriented research and was an authority in chemical-related matters in ISRO. He was associated with the major programs of ISRO such as SRE, Chandrayaan, Mangalyaan, GSLV etc.. He was also the focal point for nanotechnology for space applications in VSSC. He worked to popularize chemistry through lectures and articles in periodicals and newspapers. His recent revelation on the usage of calcium carbide for artificial ripening of mangoes attracted a lot of public interest. His theory on non-existence of liquid water on Mars is by and large accepted by the scientific community. A strong academician with over 240 research publications, two dozen book chapters, invited reviews, several patents,11 books etc., he supervised 17 PhDs. He is a globally recognized scientist as per ADL index and Stanford university. He served as president of the Society for Polymer Science, India and as executive council member of Indo-French Tech Association for a long while.

== Selected publications ==
=== Books ===
- K.S. Santhosh Kumar and C.P. Reghunadhan Nair, Polybenzoxazines, Chemistry and Applications, ISBN 9781847355003, Publisher: iSmithers, UK (2010)
- Bibin John and C.P. Reghunadhan Nair, Updates on Syntactic Foams Publisher: iSmithers, UK (2010)
- C.P. Reghunadhan Nair, RASATHANTHRAM, KANAVASANGAL,. [The unseen facets of chemistry], Chemistry Book in Malayalam for Students, publisher: DC Books, Kottayam, December, 2015
- C.P. Reghunadhan Nair, CHEMISTRY AND YOU, ISBN 9789384786953, publisher: Notion Press, Chennai, March, 2017
- C.P.Reghunadhan Nair, RASATHANTHRAM, NAMMUDE KAIKUMBILIL [The Chemistry in our palm], Popular Chemistry Book in Malayalam, ISBN 1947027476, Publisher: Notion Press, Chennai, April,2017
- C.P. Reghunadhan Nair, Astonishing Chemistry(Malayalam), Publisher: POWRAN PUBLICATIONS Aluva, DEC 2017
- D.Augustin, Satheesh Chandran, D Mathew and C.P. Reghunadhan Nair*, "High Performance Phthalonitrile Resins: Challenges and Engineering Applications, Publishers, Walter de Gruyter, Berlin ISBN 9783110640922, May 2019
- C.P.Reghunadhan Nair, Ethra Rasakaram Ee Rasathanthram” (“What an Interesting Chemistry” ) Book in Malayalam, Sahithy Publications, Trivandrum, India, August 2020.130 pages.
- C.P.Reghunadhan Nair, V.Unnikrishnan Answered Questions in Basic and Advanced Chemical Science, ISBN 978-620-2-68086-8, Lambert Academic Publishers, Latina ( July,2020)
