= School of Engineering, CUSAT =

Government Engineering College

Coordinates: 10.049°N 76.330°E

- Motto: तेजस्विनावधीतमस्तु (Sanskrit)
- Motto in English: May learning illuminate us both, the teacher and the taught
- Type: Government Engineering College
- Established: 1979
- Affiliations: UGC, AICTE, NBA, NAAC
- Principal: Dr. P. Abdulla
- Undergraduates: ~2000
- Location: Kochi, Kerala, India
- Campus: Urban
- Website: www.soe.cusat.ac.in

The School of Engineering is a college under Cochin University of Science and Technology, in Kochi (Cochin), Kerala, India. Established in 1979 for offering part-time M.Tech programmes. The school was the first in the country to introduce Information Technology as an engineering stream and is one among very few colleges in the country with a B. Tech course in Safety and Fire Engineering. The school is a Research Centre and major Consultancy Centre. A number of research projects of national importance have been sanctioned to the school by agencies like DRDO, ISRO, DST, AICTE, UGC, Coir Board, and the Coconut Development Board.

B.Tech programmes offered by the school have been accredited by the National Board of Accreditation under the Tier-I system. The board has been accorded permanent signatory status to the Washington Accord on 13 June 2014. As per the Washington Accord agreement, recognition of programmes by other signatories applies only to programmes accredited by the National Board of Accreditation that are offered by education providers accepted by the board as Tier-1 institutions.

== Overview ==
The school started offering part-time M.Tech. programmes in civil, mechanical, electrical and chemical engineering for practicing engineers in and around Cochin. It introduced B.Tech. programmes in civil engineering, mechanical engineering, electronics and communication engineering, computer science and engineering and information technology in 1995, which turned out to be a milestone in the growth of the school. B.Tech. in safety and fire engineering was added in 1996 and electrical and Electronics engineering in 2003. Having more than 2600 students, the School of Engineering is the largest academic department of the university.

Dr. P. Abdulla is the Principal of School of Engineering since March 2025.

== Admission ==
Admissions to SOE-CUSAT is based on an All India Entrance Examination known as Common Admission Test conducted by the university which includes papers for admission to undergraduate and postgraduate courses. The exam covers questions from mathematics, physics and chemistry and is announced by the university to enable candidates with a better understanding of the test pattern, types of questions that may be asked, marking scheme and more. The school has students from all over the country and abroad.

== Rankings ==
University and college rankings

Engineering – India
- NIRF (2024): 34

The National Institutional Ranking Framework ranked it 34 as University in 2024.

== Courses ==
The school functions through its seven divisions: Civil, Mechanical, Electrical, Electronics, Computer Science, Safety and Fire, and Information Technology.

Undergraduate courses B.Tech (intake in brackets)

- Civil engineering (90)
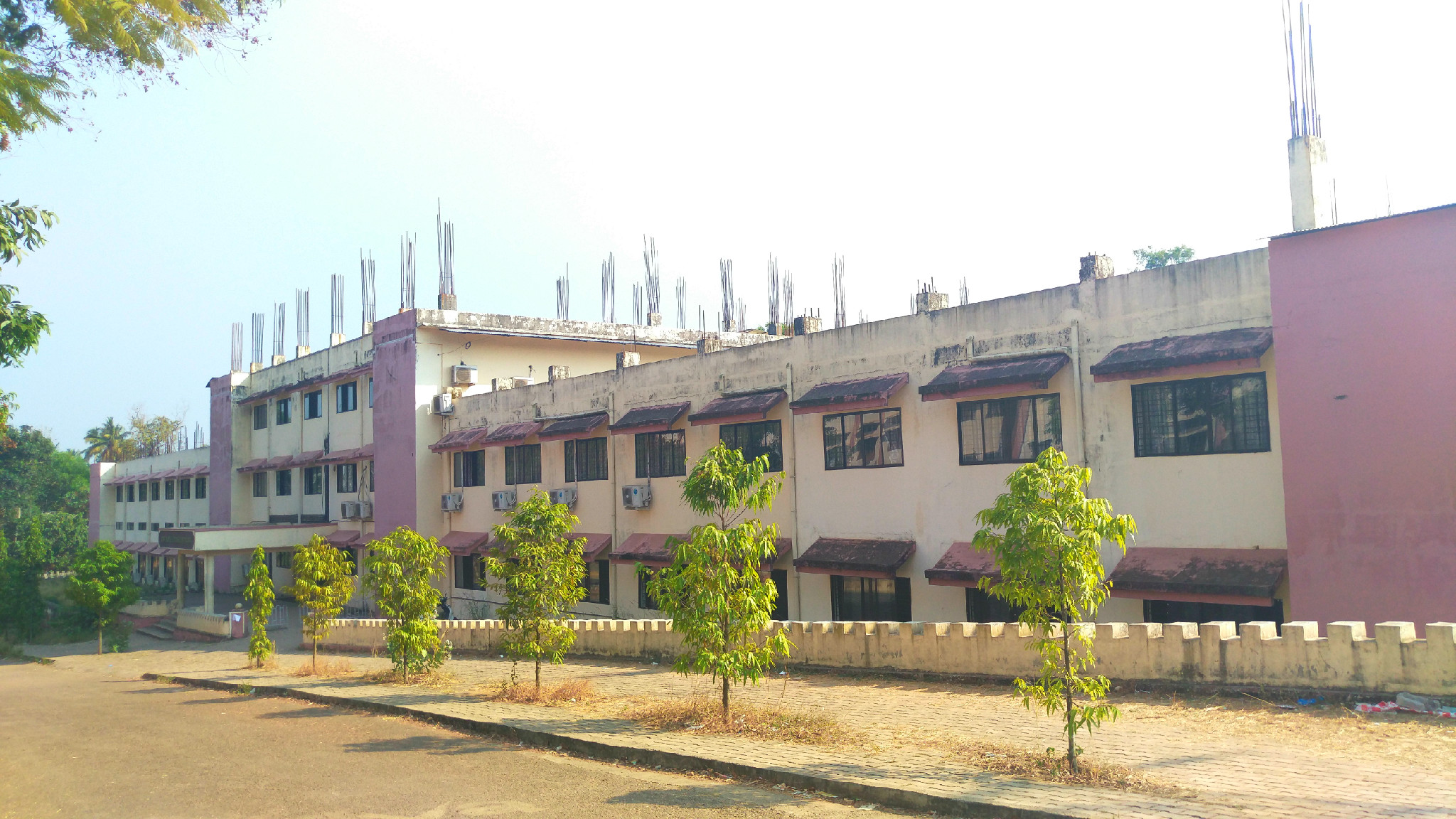
- Software Engineering block
  Computer Science and Engineering (143)
- Electrical and Electronics Engineering (60)
- Electronics and Communication engineering (90)
- Information technology (90)
- Mechanical engineering (90)
- Safety and Fire Engineering (60)
- Artificial Intelligence and Data Science(?)

Postgraduate course M.Tech. Full Time M Tech Courses

- Information Technology (Software Systems) (18)
- Computer Science and Engineering (Networking Systems) (18)
- Civil Engineering (Geo-technical Engineering) (18)
- Mechanical Engineering (Thermal Engineering) (18)
- Electronics & Communications Engineering (Wireless Technology) (18)
- Health, Safety and Environment Management (18)

Part Time M Tech Courses

- Civil Engineering (18)
- Mechanical Engineering (18)
- Chemical Engineering (18)
- Electrical Engineering (18)

Ph.D programmes All branches mentioned above.

== Student life ==
With all amenities provided within the campus itself, students seldom leave the campus. To ensure the effective implementation of the verdict given by Supreme Court of India, the school has set up anti-ragging committees at four levels.

=== Annual Festivals ===
Scienza Annual Science Fest

Scienza is a science festival which falls in the science month, February, and is organised with the purpose of igniting student interest in areas associated with technology.

The organisation of entire event has been funded and supported by ISSE, PTA and faculty members of School of Engineering.

=== Dhishna ===
Dhishna is the annual techno-management fest of the school. It includes competitions, paper presentations, exhibitions, quizzes, model displays and robotics events.

- Xplendor was the annual techfest of the School of Engineering. It was revamped and renamed Dhishna in 2011 and encompasses a wide spectrum of activities and is managed entirely by students. Xplendor was usually organized in February. The first Xplendor was conducted in 2010, with 34 events including guest lectures, workshops, and musical night, and attracted 30 colleges from all over India. The winners of the events shared prize money of INR 2 lakhs.

=== Vipanchika ===
Vipanchika is the arts and cultural festival of the school. It is a three-day festival which encompasses various arts and cultural activities, which mainly differentiated as on stage and off stage events. It is held in winter semester.

=== Sargam ===
Sargam is the arts and cultural festival of the Cochin University of Science and Technology. It is a five-day festival comprising various arts and cultural activities, ON STAGE and OFF the STAGE events.

=== Student organisations ===
- The Institute of Electrical and Electronics Engineering (IEEE)

It is the world's largest technical society. A student branch of the IEEE was established in the university in 1986 as the 4th Student Branch Chapter in IEEE Kerala section after CET, NSSCE Palakkad and TKMCE Kollam. Majority of the members are undergraduates from School of Engineering. The IEEE student members receive all the technical and professional benefits of IEEE membership at subsidized rates. The branch is supervised by a Branch Counsellor who is a faculty member of the university having an IEEE membership. The student branch organizes activities such as seminars and invited speeches by technical experts.

- Indian Green Building Council (IGBC) Student Chapter

The student chapter was inaugurated on 14 March 2018 by then Hon. Vice Chancellor Dr. J Latha in the presence of Chairman IGBC Kochi Chapter, Mr. B R Ajith. The student chapter has an active participant from students of all departments of SOE in all the activities such as seminars, speeches by technical experts, competitions etc.

== See also ==
- Indian Institute of Technology Palakkad
- National Institute of Technology Calicut
- National Institute of Technology, Tiruchirappalli
- National Institute of Technology Karnataka
- Kunjali Marakkar School of Marine Engineering
