= National Space Olympiad =

Indian science competition

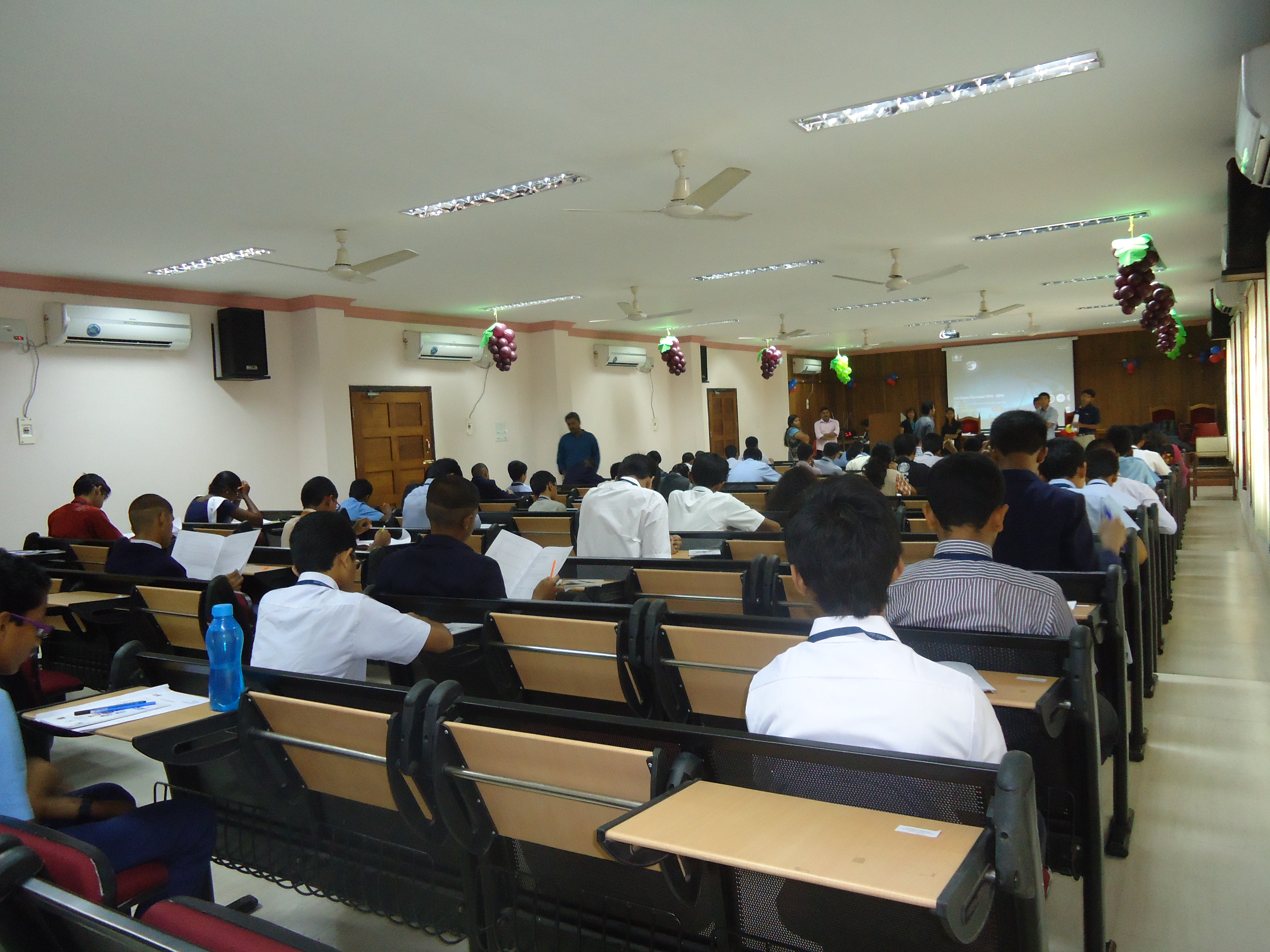
National Space Olympiad 2014 Exam

The National Space Olympiad (NSO) is a science competition conducted in India. The competition is conducted at the Department of Physics, Cochin University of science and Technology. Students from class eight to class ten can participate in the competition. The National Space Olympiad is conducted in remembrance of Indian astronaut Kalpana Chawla.

== Competition Pattern ==
There are 4 levels in NSO, an online examination conducted on the website, a written examination and two level of Quiz competition related to astrophysics, space science etc. The online examination and written examination consists of multiple choice questions. Students must pass the online examination to attend the event. The written examination and the quiz competition are conducted at CUSAT.

== How to Participate ==
Students from class 8 to class 10 of the schools all over India can participate NSO. Students of any recognized school across India can attend the program. Online registration will be opened and those who register have to attend an online test from which participants will be selected for Finals. Those selected ones can participate in NSO Final Event.

== Winners ==
In NSO 2013-2014 Govind S. Sankar of Bhavans Varuna Vidyalaya, Thrikkakkara has topped in the National Space Olympiad organized by The Inter-University Centre for Astronomy and Astrophysics Resource Centre (IUCAA Resource Centre), Department of Physics, Cochin University of Science and Technology and Eureka Next Intellectual Services Pvt Ltd . S. Harikrishnan (Government Higher Secondary School, Valayanchirangara) and K.E. Ajayakrishnan (Bhavans Vidyamandir, Iringalakkuda) shared second prizes. Johan Cheriyan (Indian School, Muscat) got third, S. Aswin (Government Higher Secondary School, Koyilandy) got fourth and Richard Sibi (St. Kuriakose Public School) got fifth positions.

== Prizes ==
In NSO 2013-2014 Prizes are sponsored by Centre for Health Intelligence Learning and Development (CHILD) is a non-governmental and not – for – profit organization.

== National Space Olympiad 2014 ==
In 2014 the event was conducted on 8 February 2014 by The Inter-University Centre for Astronomy and Astrophysics Resource Centre (IUCAA Resource Centre), Department of Physics, Cochin University of Science and Technology and Eureka Next Intellectual Services Pvt Ltd. The Session on space Science was done by Prof. P R Madhava Panicker A veteran with Mtech from IISC, had associated with ISRO from 1971 -2005, and now engaged as Professor at RSET, Kochi. A renowned science writer, an active member of KSSP from 1969 and a life member of INSARM "Indian National Society for Aerospace and Related Mechanisms" and ISOI "Instrument Society of India". The NSO Finals round quiz was mastered by Mr. Sreejith K R, he Completed his M. Tech in Instrumentation and Applied Physics from Indian Institute of Science (IISc), Bangalore. He has around 8 years of teaching and research experience. He has published papers in several peer-reviewed National and International journals. An expert in giving invited talks in different areas of engineering and applied physics as well as in conducting technical quizzes. Currently working as Asst. Prof. Electronics and Instrumentation dept., FISAT, Angamaly.

== National Space Olympiad 2015 ==
In 2015 the event is announced on 11 January 2015. The venue is at Dept of Physics, CUSAT. The event is organized by Department of Physics, Cochin University of Science and Technology and Edumithra Intellectual Services Pvt Ltd. A technical talk by Prof. P.S Nair, former deputy director of ISRO and a telescope making session by IUCCA Resource Centre, CUSAT are included in the event after the quiz. The Online Examination is on 30 November 2014.

== Gallery ==
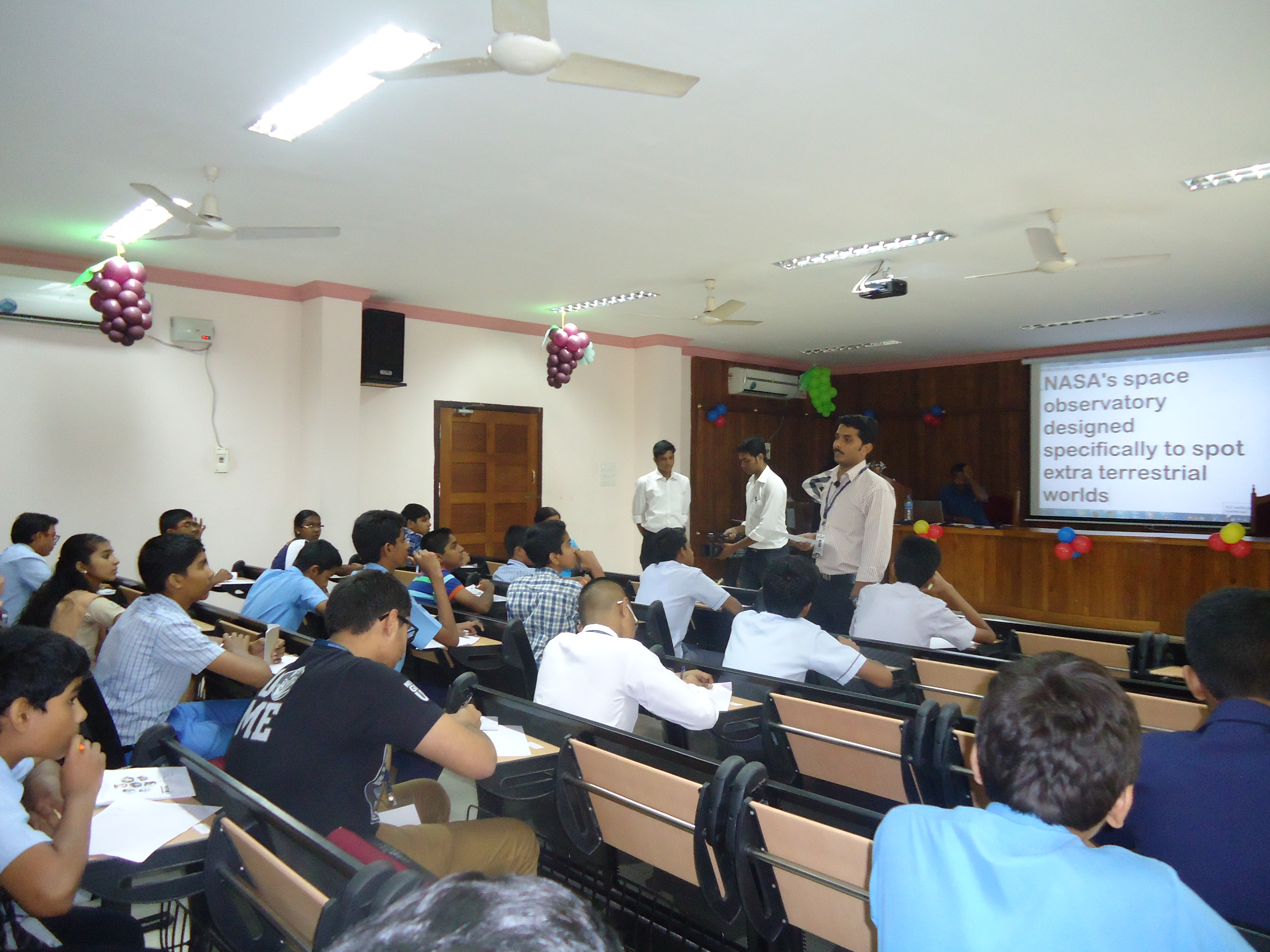
National Space Olympiad 2014 Quiz

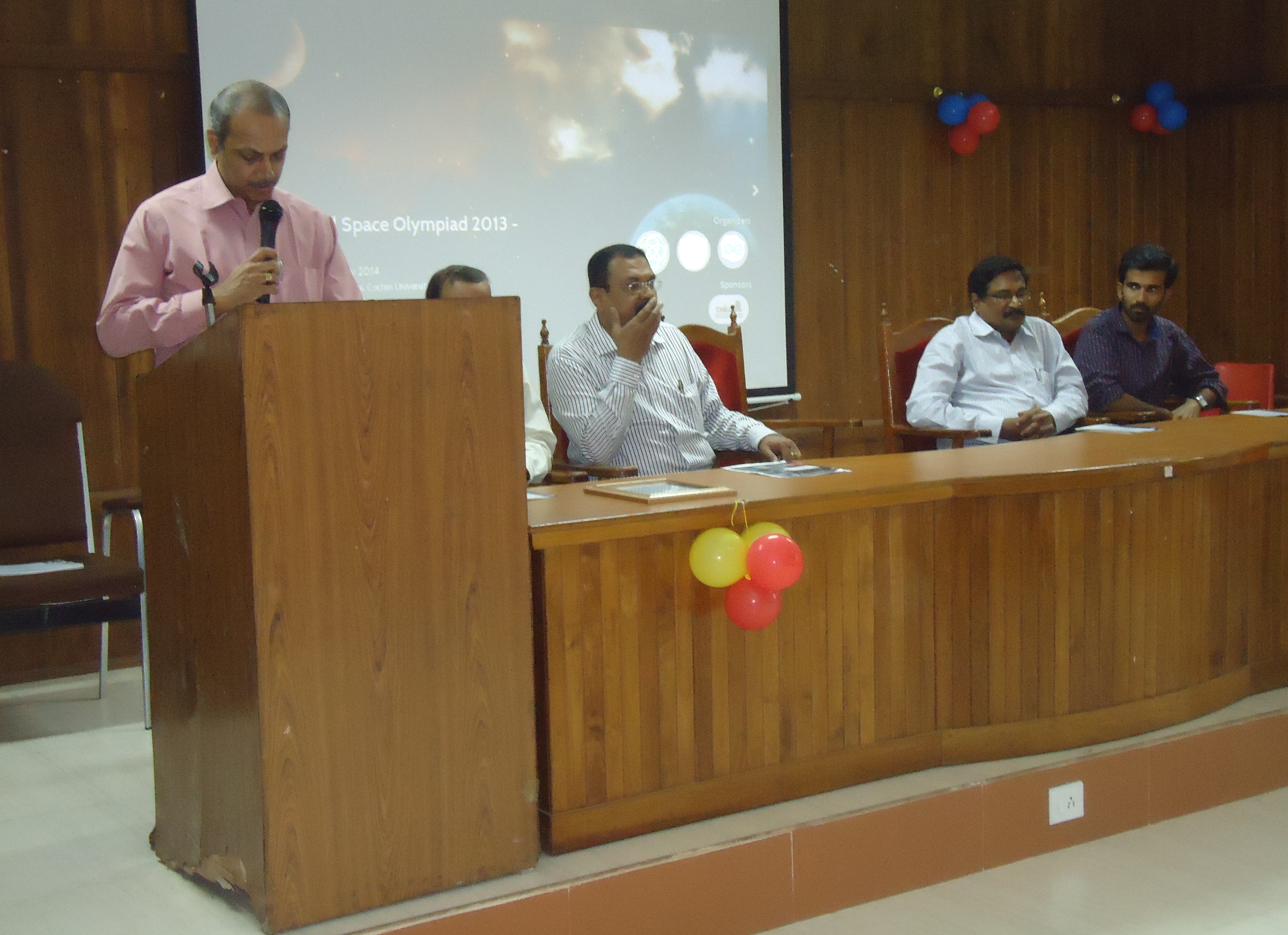
National Space Olympiad 2014 Closing ceremony

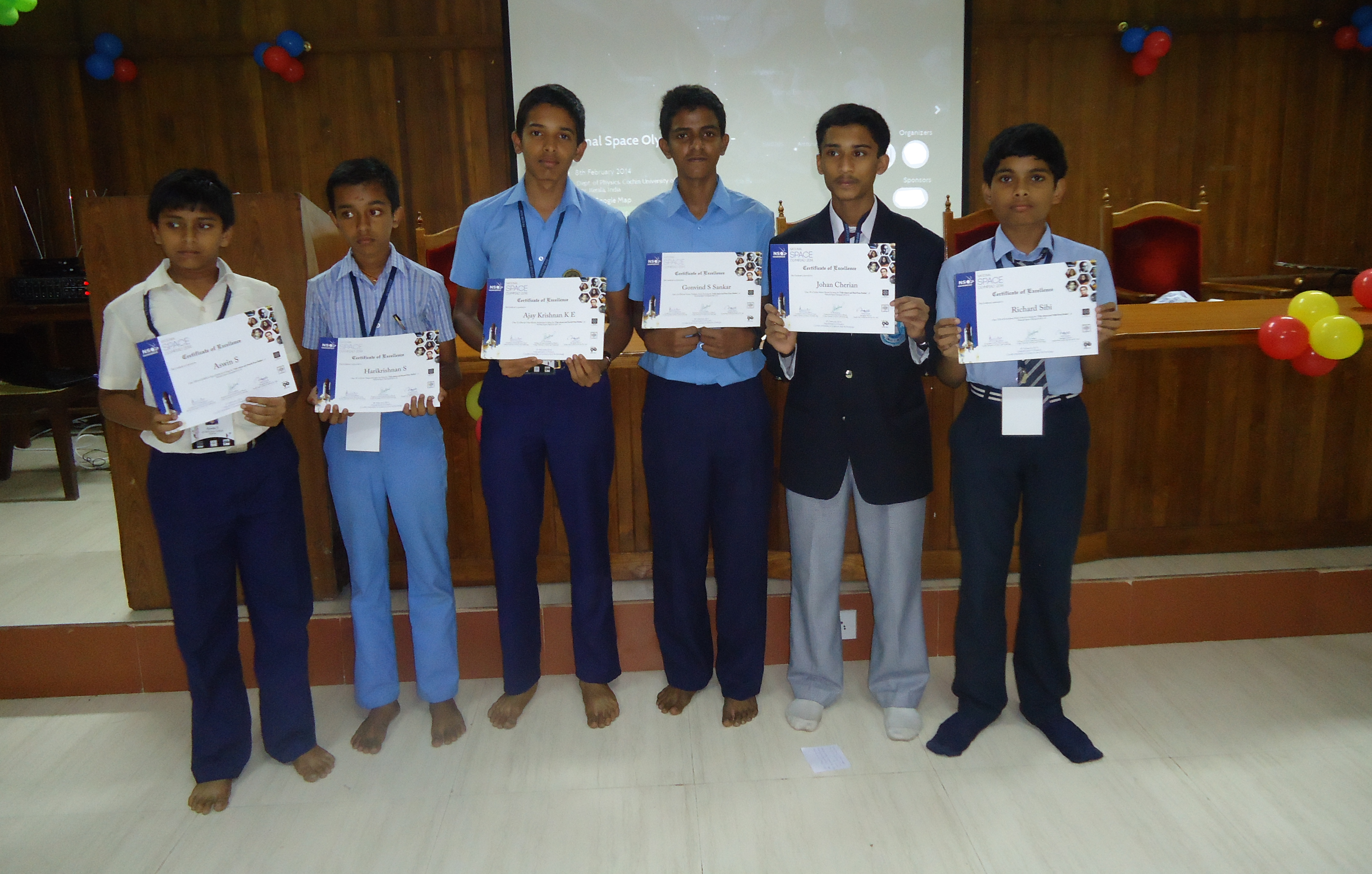
National Space Olympiad 2014 Winners

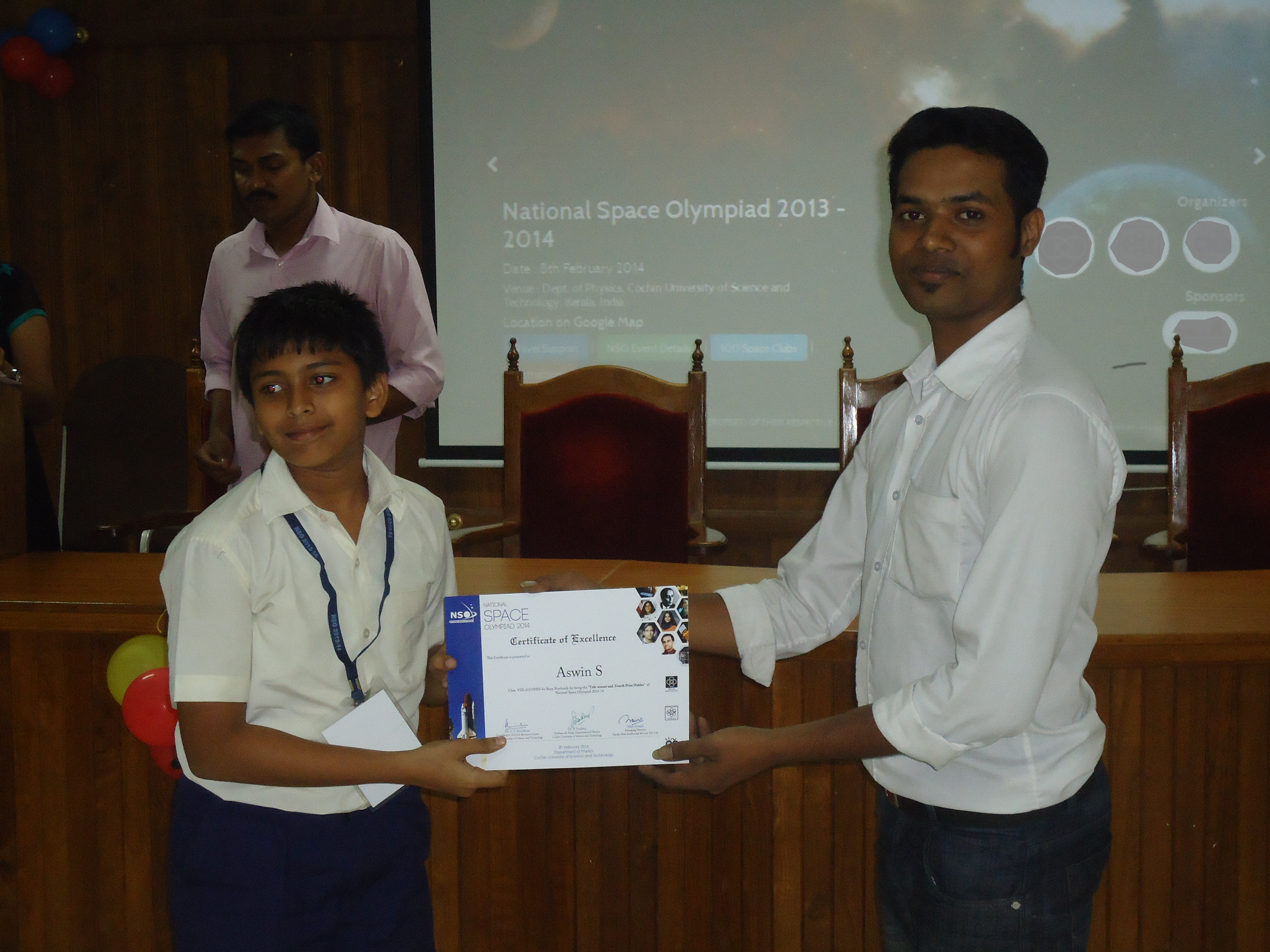
National Space Olympiad 2014 Prize

== See also ==
Cochin University of Science and Technology

International Space Olympiad
