= Appu Krishnan =

Music producer and songwriter based in Los Angeles, California, United States

Appu Krishnan (born December 22, 1981), known professionally as The Professor, is a music producer and songwriter based in Los Angeles, California. He started his professional career in the US as an instructor at the prestigious "Musicians Institute" in Hollywood teaching programming, mixing and synthesizers. Rapidly he moved on to working with Sony/RCA label as a producer and songwriter. He has worked with artists such as Christina Aguilera, Jordin Sparks and The Jacksons; and collaborated with producers such as Shea Taylor, Brandon Friesen and Emile Ghantous.

== Biography ==
Originally from Kerala, India, "The Professor" discovered his love for music at a very young age. He started playing Keyboards in his native Kochi for local school and college bands. In his teens Appu was part of Rajagiri High School, Sacred Heart College and Cochin University bands winning several inter university competitions and eventually becoming a session musician and programmer. In college he studied Physics and later graduated from the Cochin University of Science and Technology with a Bachelors in Mechanical Engineering.

Showing huge appreciation for synths and music technology, Appu moved to the United States and enrolled in the Audio Engineering program at Musicians Institute, followed by the Keyboard Technology program and eventually completing his studies with a Bachelor's in Keyboard performance.

== Career ==
The Professor has had a broad experience with different types of music starting with organic Independent rock all the way to Pop and EDM.

=== Early works ===
During 2009-2010 Appu worked as Engineer with the Italian composer Valente Bertelli and Aaron Embry on Valente's album Music for Rooftops. In 2011 he worked with the Colombian singer Laura Torres AKA "Laura y la Máquina de escribir" on her debut album Laberinto. The album consisted of Spanish and English songs with rock, indie influences combined with creative visuals and soundscapes. Appu produced and mixed the entire album. The single Laberinto won the John Lennon Songwriting Contest. In his student years at Musicians Institute, Appu also did set ups and sound design for the Brazilian keyboard player Renato Neto for his concerts with Prince.

=== Pop production and recent projects ===
In 2012 Appu worked alongside Tracklacers and songwriters Jamie Hartman and Phil Bentley on the Christina Aguilera Album "Lotus". He was in charge of writing and arranging synth strings and piano for that album's song "Army of Me". In 2013, Appu was a composer on "The Best Man Holiday - Original Soundtrack" album. for the Universal Pictures movie The Best Man Holiday In 2014 he co wrote and co produced Greek artist Eleni Foureira's single "Party Sleep Repeat" along with Vassy, Phil Bentley and Blackjack music. In 2014 he worked for the major music production software company East West creating "Intruder". Which is a demo that showcases the full potential of their newest piece of gear "PRO Drummer". In 2015, the Grammy nominated artist Lisa Harriton, Joshua Bartholomew and The Professor, joined forces to create Elle Rae's "Lovestruck".

K-Pop

In 2016 Appu co-wrote the K- pop song "It's Me (Pick Me)" (Hangul: 나야 나 (PICK ME); RR: Naya na (Pick Me) for the contestants of Produce 101 Season 2, which also served as the theme song of the show. It was released online as a digital single on March 9, 2017, by CJ E&M, along with a music video starring Lee Dae-hwi as chosen center. On the show's official soundtrack, a piano version of the song was released and was played in the season's final episode. It was confirmed that the main vocals for the track were done by only 19 selected trainees and the other trainees did background vocals. The song was re-released by Wanna One, the winning group of Produce 101 Season 2 on their album 1X1=1 (To Be One).

It was chosen as one of the most influential and memorable Kpop songs of the year by several industry professionals.[2][3] . The song peaked at #9 on Gaon Digital Chart and has sold 781,339[5] so far.

In 2017 the song "Another Day" co-written and co-produced by Appu was selected as the soundtrack for Criminal Minds (South Korean TV series). The song featured the artist Yoo Hoe Seung (유회승) of N.Flying.

=== Other works ===
Appu has collaborated with producer Brandon Friesen on various projects including Billy Ray Cyrus, Laura Bell Bundy and Friesen's Arbor TV artists. He has engineered for The Jacksons alongside producer Emile Ghantous. Other collaborations include RCA artist Treasure Davis, Canadian singer Aleesia Stamkos and American songwriter Melinda Ortner.

=== Academic work ===
Appu Krishnan gives yearly lectures at the Grammy Museum in Los Angeles on Synthesis and sampling. He teaches Music Production and Synthesis at Musicians Institute, Hollywood.
