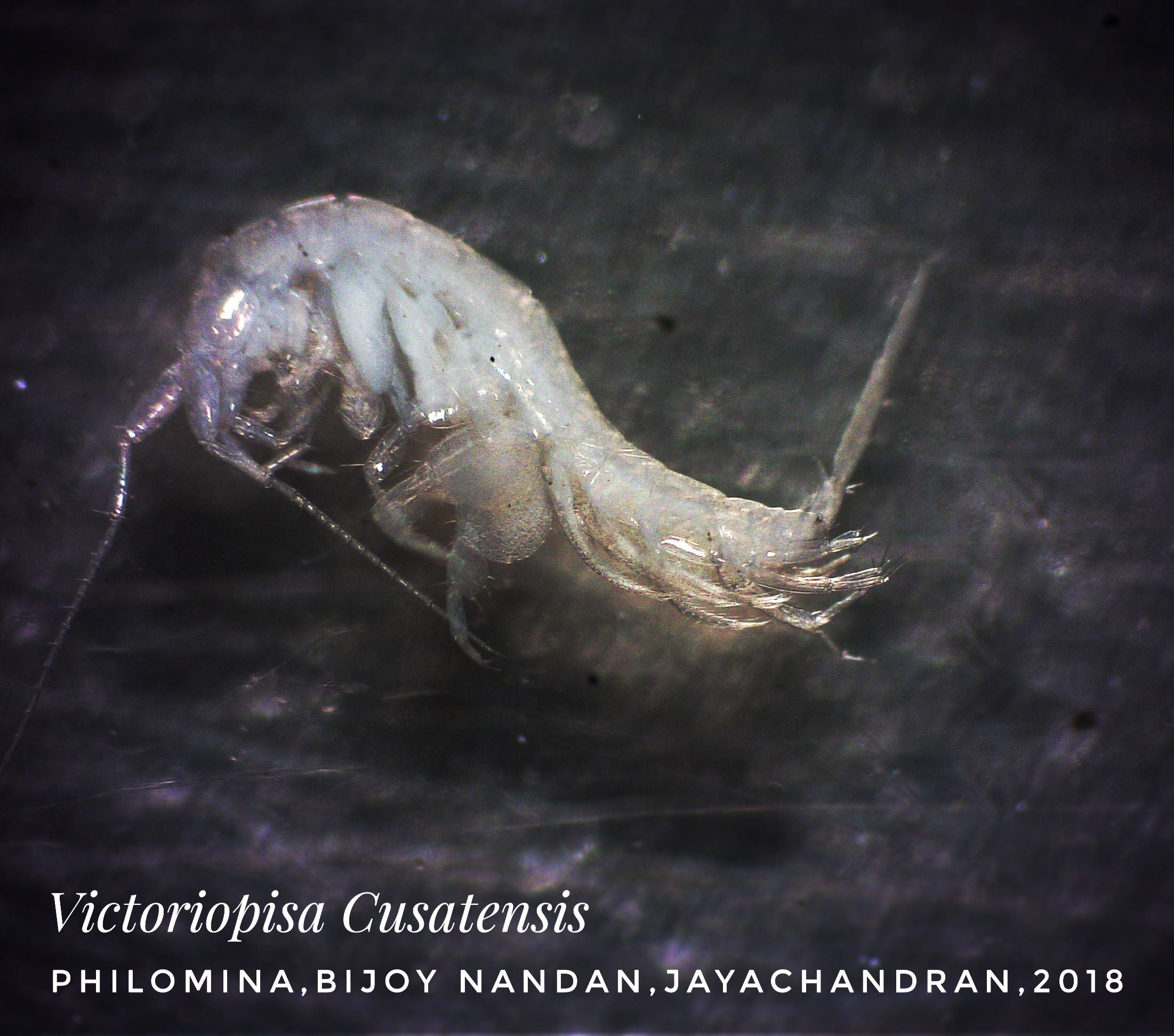

Scientific classification
- Domain: Eukaryota
- Kingdom: Animalia
- Phylum: Arthropoda
- Class: Malacostraca
- Order: Amphipoda
- Family: Eriopisidae
- Genus: Victoriopisa
- Species: V. cusatensis

Binomial name
- Victoriopisa cusatensis Joseph, Nandan & Jayachandran, 2018

= Victoriopisa cusatensis =

Species of crustacean

Victoriopisa cusatensis is a amphipod species in the family Eriopisidae. The species name ‘cusatensis’ refers to the Cochin University of Science and Technology (CUSAT). This species has been described by the team of researchers (Philomina Joseph, Sivasankaran Bijoy Nandan and Jayachandran P. R.) in 2018 from the Valanthakad mangrove area of Vembanad backwater.

== Distribution ==
This is the 14th of this genus to be discovered and lives in complex mangrove habitats in the area. The Kochi backwaters are already home to another similar species, Victoriopisa chilkensis, which is the dominant amphipod of this genus in these waters. These crustaceans are found in a wide range of habitats ranging from brackish to coastal areas including sea grass beds, sandy-muddy-tidal flats and rock pools.

== Taxonomic details ==
The male amphipoda was 8.4 mm long while the two females measured 7.6 mm and 6.7 mm. The new species is the third of genus Victoriopisa from Indian waters. Victoriopisa cusatensis differs from other species of Victoriopisa by presenting a characteristic projection at dorsolateral margin of peduncle article 2 of antenna 1 in male while smooth in female; broad triangular lateral cephalic lobe; posteroventral tooth in epimeral plates; presence of lateral and subapical spines in telson; and smooth palm of gnathopod without any excavations, according to the researchers.
