= International Space Olympiad =

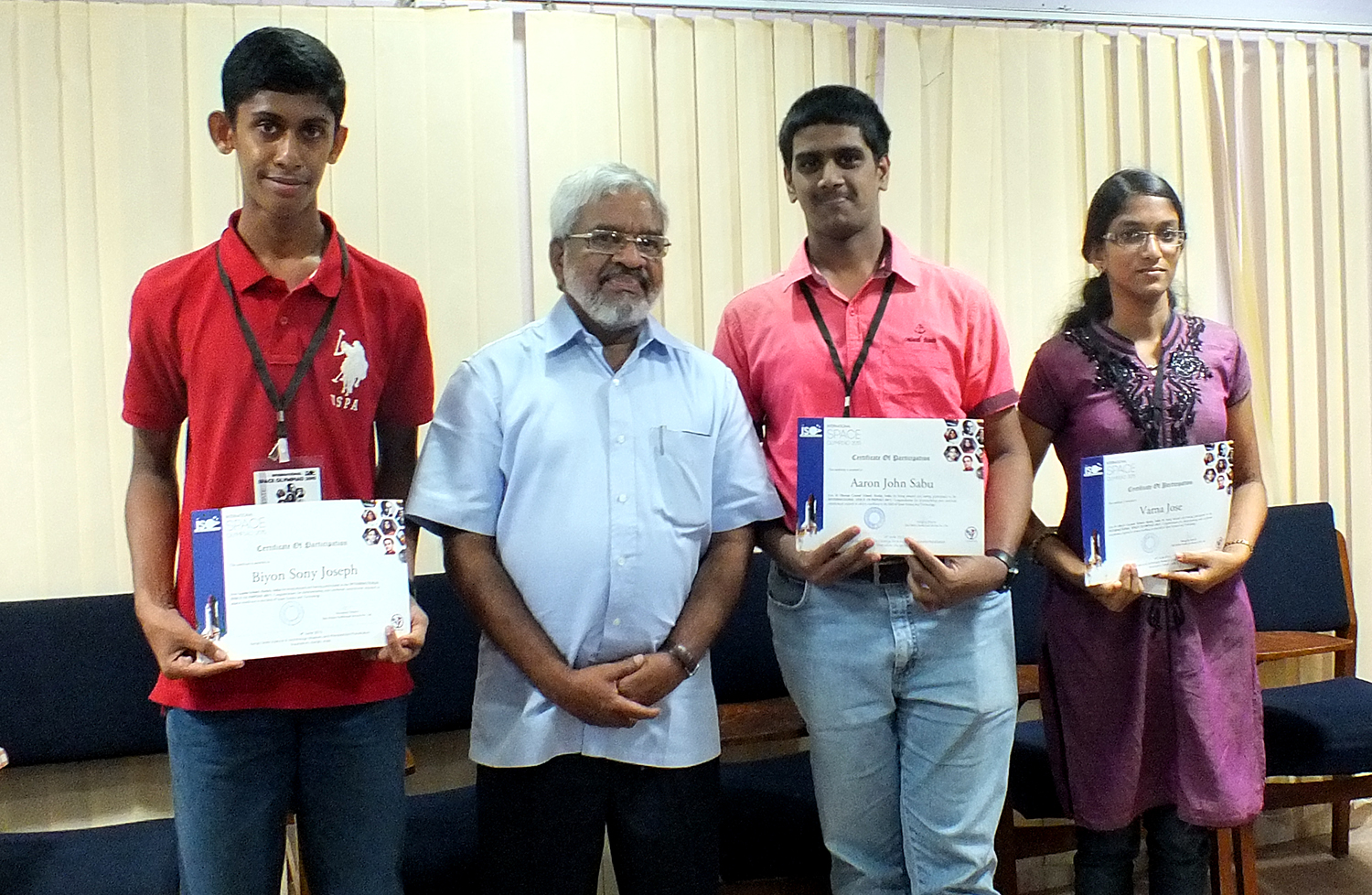
International Space Olympiad 2014-15 Winners with Padma Sree Dr. M Chandradathan.

International Space Olympiad (ISO) is an international level Quiz competition on space science and technology for students of Grades 5-12 and is organized by Edu Mithra Intellectual services Pvt. Ltd., every year with a mission to attract and encourage talents in the fields of space science and technology and enhance the aptitude of children in space science.

== Competition structure ==
The International Space Olympiad starts with the school level competitions is followed by and the Zonal, National and the International Levels. On every level students compete to qualify for the next level and based on merits of performance, students are shortlisted to participate in the next level. Each level consists of written and audio visual rounds of quiz and the champions are selected from the international level of ISO.

== Prizes ==
The winners of International Space Olympiad are awarded prizes including Newtonian reflector telescopes and Certificates.

== International Space Olympiad 2014-15 ==
The first ISO was conducted in 2015. The final international level was organized at Kerala State Science and Technology Museum and Priyadarshini Planetarium, Trivandrum, Kerala, India on 14 June 2015. Biyon Sony Joseph of Loyola School, Kerala, Varna Jose of St Mary’s Convent School, Kerala, Aaron John Sabu of St Thomas Central School, Kerala were awarded the first, second and third prizes respectively. The event constituted of the audio visual and written rounds of quiz in the morning session handled by Prof. Anand Narayan, Professor of Indian Institute of Space Science and Technology, Trivandrum, Kerala, India. The afternoon session was an interactive and seminar session by Padma Shri M. Chandradathan, the former Director of Vikram Sarabhai Space Center, Trivandrum, Kerala, India. He also awarded the prize to the winners and certificate of participation to all the participants.

== International Space Olympiad 2015-16 ==
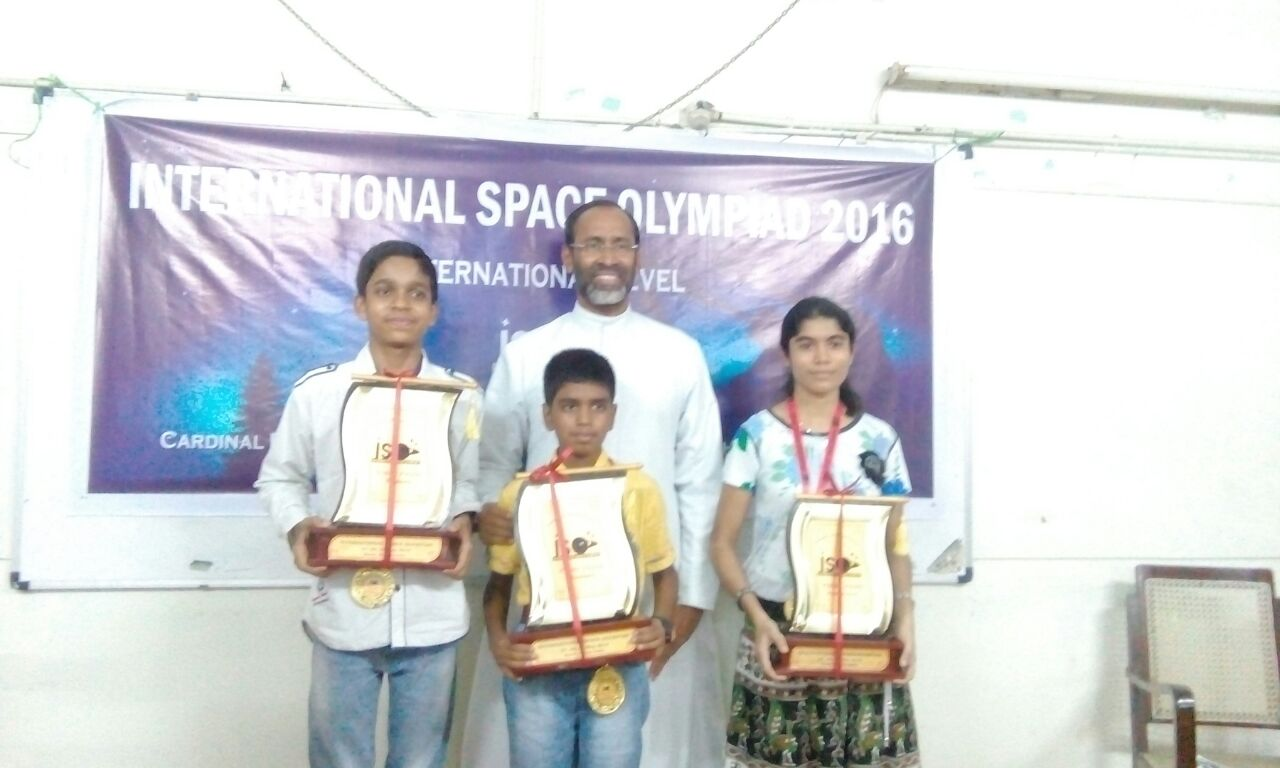
International Space Olymiad 2015-16 Winners (Sai S Kalyan, Arpit Kottur, Riya Titus) with Fr. Davis Chiramel.

The International Level Competitions of International Space Olympiad 2016 were held at Renewal Center Kochi. Selected students of classes 5-12 from various countries participated in the competition to win the title and the competition was designed to examine their knowledge in space science, history of space explorations and space technology. Sai S Kalyan from Chinmaya Vidyalaya, Arpit Kottur from Podar International School Pune and Riya Titus from Mar Gregarious Memorial Residential Public School won the title prizes in the competition which was held in three categories namely Juniors, Seniors and Super seniors. Eminent personalities from the field of space science handled the quizzes and the related workshop sessions. The event was scheduled as a three day camp and consisted of many innovative and informative sessions on space science and astrophysics.

In the valedictory function held Fr. Davis Chiramel, founder and director of Kidney Federation of India interacted with the children and gave away the prizes. The winners received Newtonian Reflector Telescopes as title prizes.
