= Kunjali Marakkar School of Marine Engineering =

Marine Engineering College in Kerala, India

- Kunjali Marakkar School of Marine Engineering
- Type: University Engineering College
- Established: 2003
- Affiliations: Cochin University of Science and Technology
- Director: V. V.Paul
- Students: 300
- Location: Kalamassery, Kerala, India
- Campus: CUSAT Main Campus
- Language: English
- Website: kmsme.cusat.ac.in

Kunjali Marakkar School of Marine Engineering (KMSME) located in Cochin, Kerala, India, is the first marine engineering college in the state of Kerala. Located in the Cochin University of Science and Technology (CUSAT) main campus, KMSME started its first batch of four-year B-Tech marine engineering programme in 2003 and opened its own campus in 2007. It is the only marine engineering training institute in the country, that is under the direct control of state owned Government University.

== History ==
The B-Tech Marine Engineering course was started in CUSAT in 2003 as a division of the School of Engineering. However, due to the uniqueness of the course, an exclusive campus was devised later. The foundation stone of the campus was laid on February 2, 2006, and it was inaugurated by the then Chief Minister V. S. Achuthanandan on October 28, 2007. Meanwhile, the university separated the course from the School of Engineering and called it Kunjali Marakkar School of Marine Engineering.

B-Tech Marine Engineering which is a compulsorily residential regimental course secured approval of both the AICTE and Director General of Shipping as it is a pre-sea course. B-Tech's enrolment increased from 40 to 80 in 2013. In 2017 Nila John from the institute became the first lady in Kerala to successfully complete the Marine Engineering course.

== Administration ==
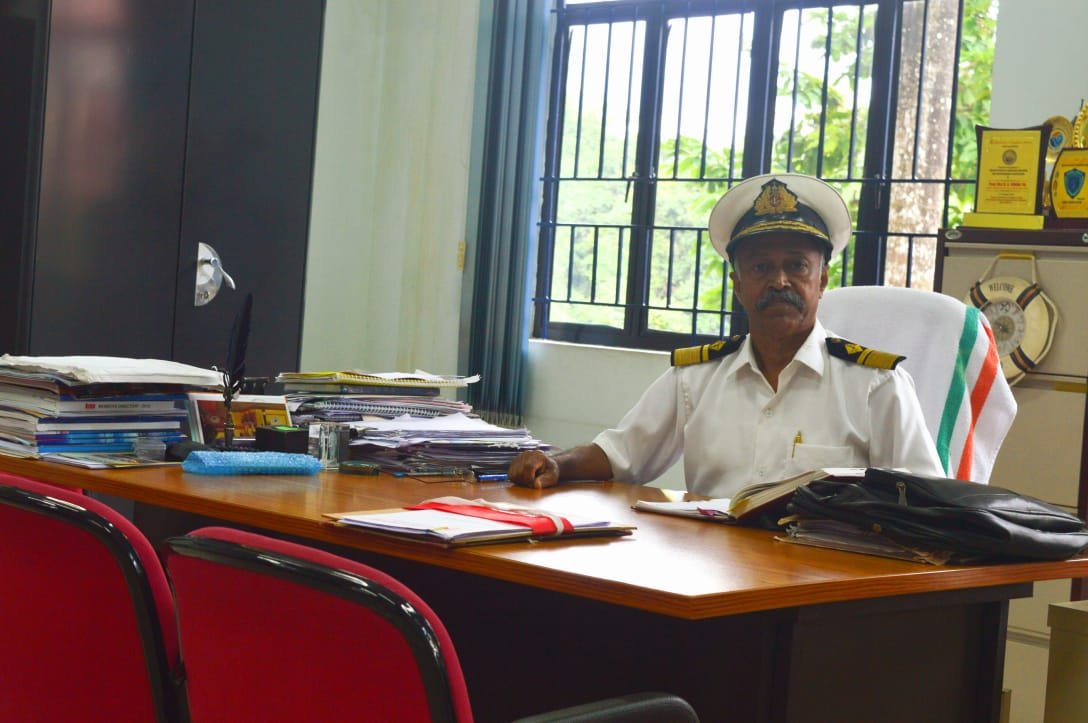
Dr KA Simon, the first and longest serving director in the history of the institute

The current director of the institute is R. Venugopal who took over the office from John Pyle in October 2022. Dr. K.A Simon is the first and longest serving director in the history of the institute. He joined KMSME in the year 2007 and was the director for 12 years until October 2019.

== Admissions ==
Admissions are available through a common admissions test administered by CUSAT. The college offers students courses in B-Tech and M-Tech Marine Engineering. M-Tech course was started in 2016.

== Sports ==
=== University Sports Captains ===
Students from the KMSME had been appointed as the Sports Captain of the CUSAT for several times. So far 6 people has been appointed as the sports captain within the last 12 years.

=== Volleyball ===
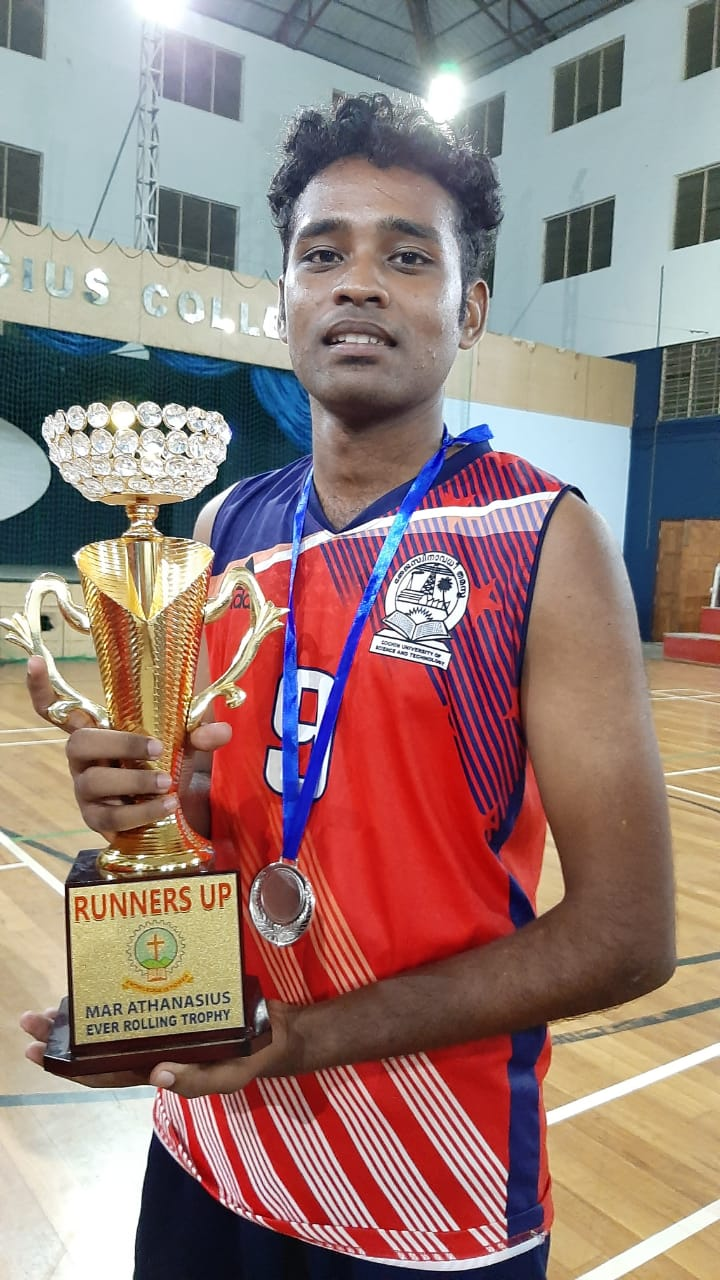
Nitheesh Sasankan, captain of the volleyball team of KMSME from 2018 to 2020

In 2018, the KMSME volleyball team created history by winning the university championship for the first time under the captaincy of Nitheesh Sasankan. On seeing his performance, he was trialed by Kochi Blue Spikers for their 2018 season squad. He was picked but were on put on the reserves list in case of any injury backup.

=== Football ===
In 2020 the football team of the college won their first ever university championship under the captaincy of Azeem Russel. The team was coached by Muthu Krishnan and Sarath S. The team was mentored by Vishal Kishor.

==== 2020 University Championship winning team ====
- Rifin Shaji
- Muhammed Rashid
- Anantu Kailas
- Sijith Kumar
- Ameen Nazar
- Azeem Russel
- Anand Ashok
- Abu Swalih
- Vishnu J Valsan
- Vishnu S (Allu)

== Techno Cultural Festivals ==
=== Propulzo ===
The Propulzo is the Kerala's only National level Maritime Techno-cultural festival organised by the students of KMSME. The first edition was organised in 2016. In the 2020 edition of the Propulzo, Sunburn Campus also took place for the second time in the history of CUSAT.

== See also ==
- Cochin University of Science and Technology
- Directorate General of Shipping
- Marine engineering
