= Cochin University of Science and Technology =

University in Cochin, Kerala, India

- Motto: tejasvi nāvadhītamastu (Sanskrit)
- Motto in English: May learning illumine us both
- Type: State University
- Established: 10 July 1971; 55 years ago
- Affiliations: UGC, NAAC, AICTE, AIU, ACU, NBA
- Chancellor: Governor of Kerala
- Vice-Chancellor: Dr. M. Junaid Bushiri (I/C)
- Pro-Chancellor: Roji M. John (Minister for Higher Education)
- Location: University Road, South Kalamassery, Kochi, Kerala, India; 10.0443°N 76.3282°E
- Campus: Urban, 180 acres (73 ha)
- Colours: Light green Gray
- Website: www.cusat.ac.in

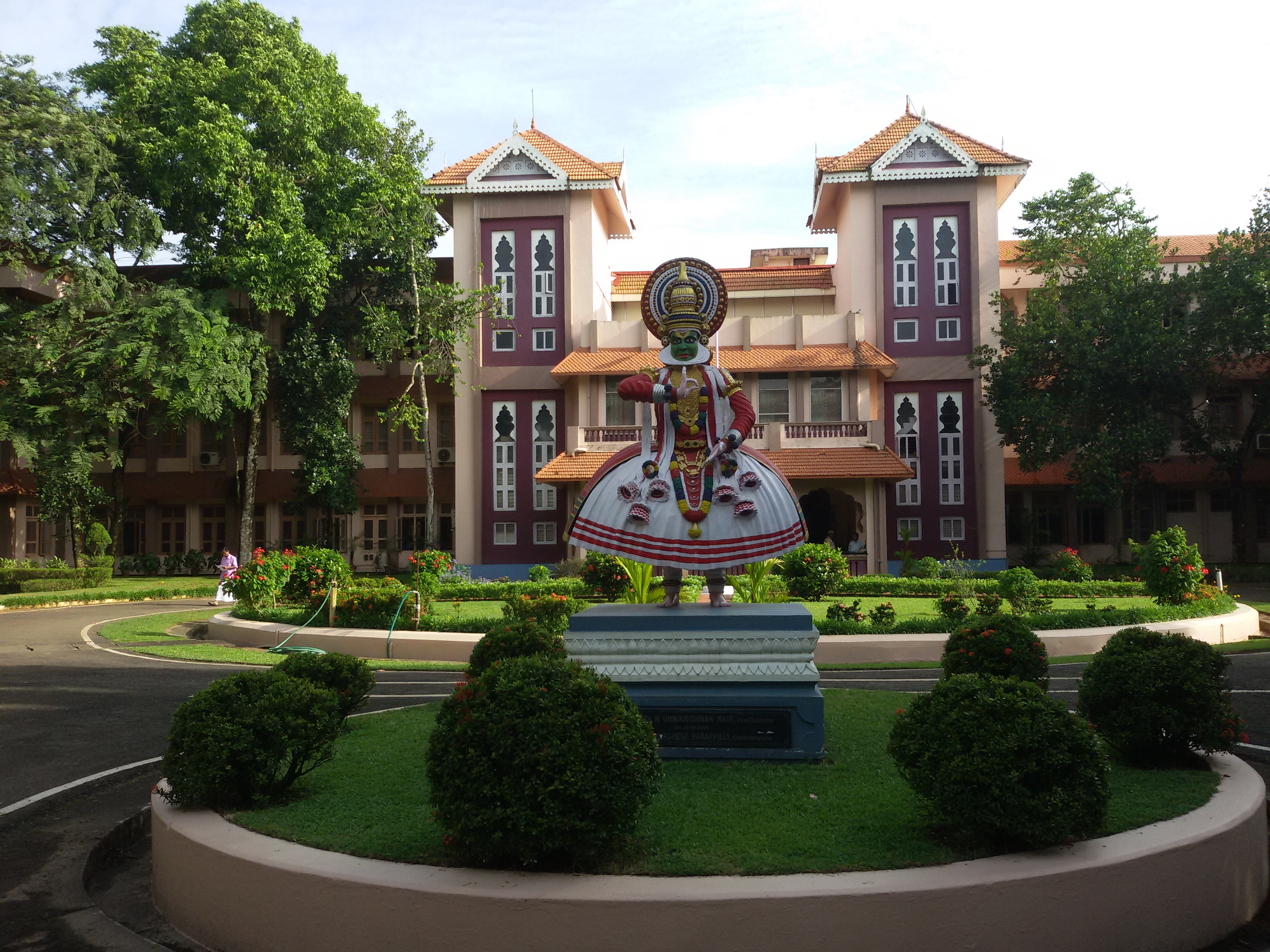
Administrative office

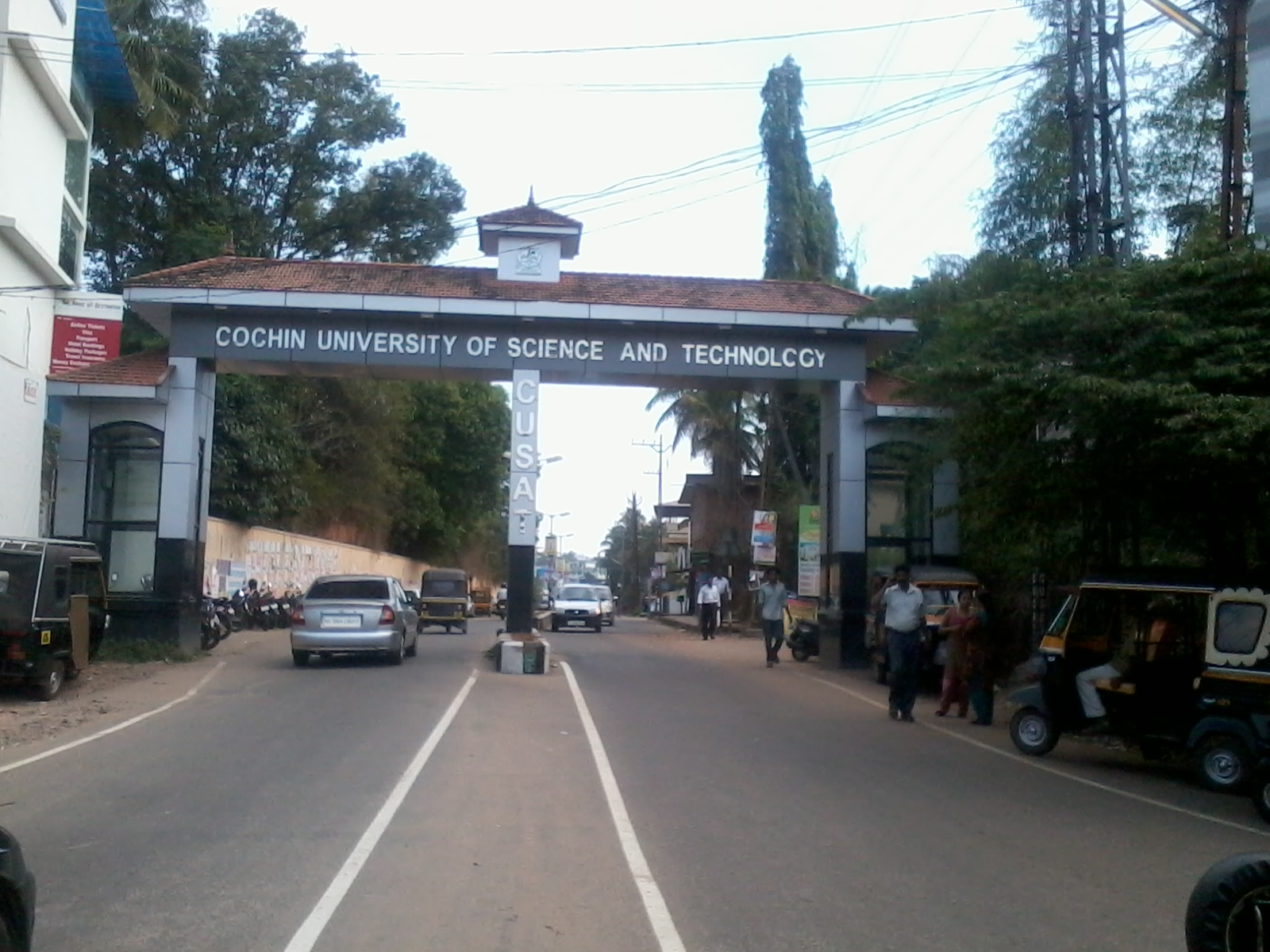
Main gate of Cochin campus (CUSAT)

Cochin University of Science and Technology (CUSAT) is a state government-owned autonomous university in Kochi, Kerala, India. It was founded in 1971 and has three campuses: two in Kochi (Kalamassery and Ernakulam) and one in Kuttanad, Alappuzha, some 66 km (41 mi) from Kochi.

The university was founded in 1971 as the University of Cochin through an act of the Kerala Legislature, which was the result of a campaign for postgraduate education in the state. It was renamed as Cochin University of Science and Technology (CUSAT) in February 1986. Its goals are to promote undergraduate and postgraduate studies and advanced research in applied science, technology, industry, commerce, management and social sciences.

Admissions to both undergraduate and postgraduate courses are based on the Common Admission Test (CAT). Departmental Admission Tests (DAT) are conducted for some postgraduate courses. As of 2019, the university has 29 Departments of study and research, offering graduate and post-graduate programmes across a wide spectrum of disciplines in Engineering, Science, Technology, Humanities, Law & Management. The university has academic links and exchange programmes with several institutions across the globe.

A new species of amphipod collected from the Cochin backwaters was named Victoriopisa cusatensis after the university in 2018.

The motto of the university is Tejasvinavadhithamastu, which is taken from the Vedas and conveys "May the wisdom accrued deify us both – the teacher and the taught - and percolate to the universe in its totality".

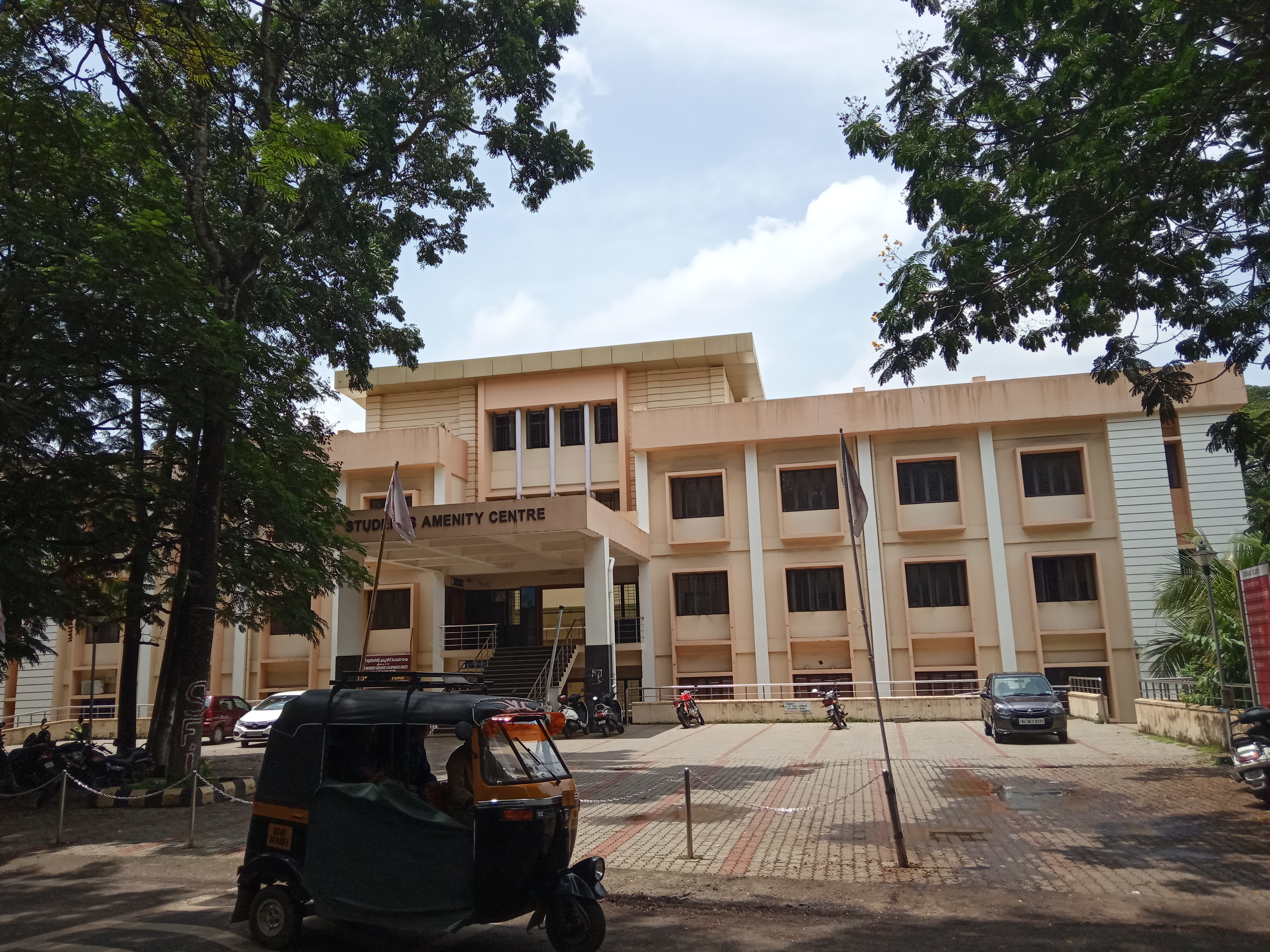
Student Amenity Center

== Campuses ==
The university has three campuses: two are in Kochi, and one is at Pulinkunnu, Kuttanad, Alappuzha about 65 km south of Kochi in the state of Kerala.

=== Main (Thrikkakara) Campus ===
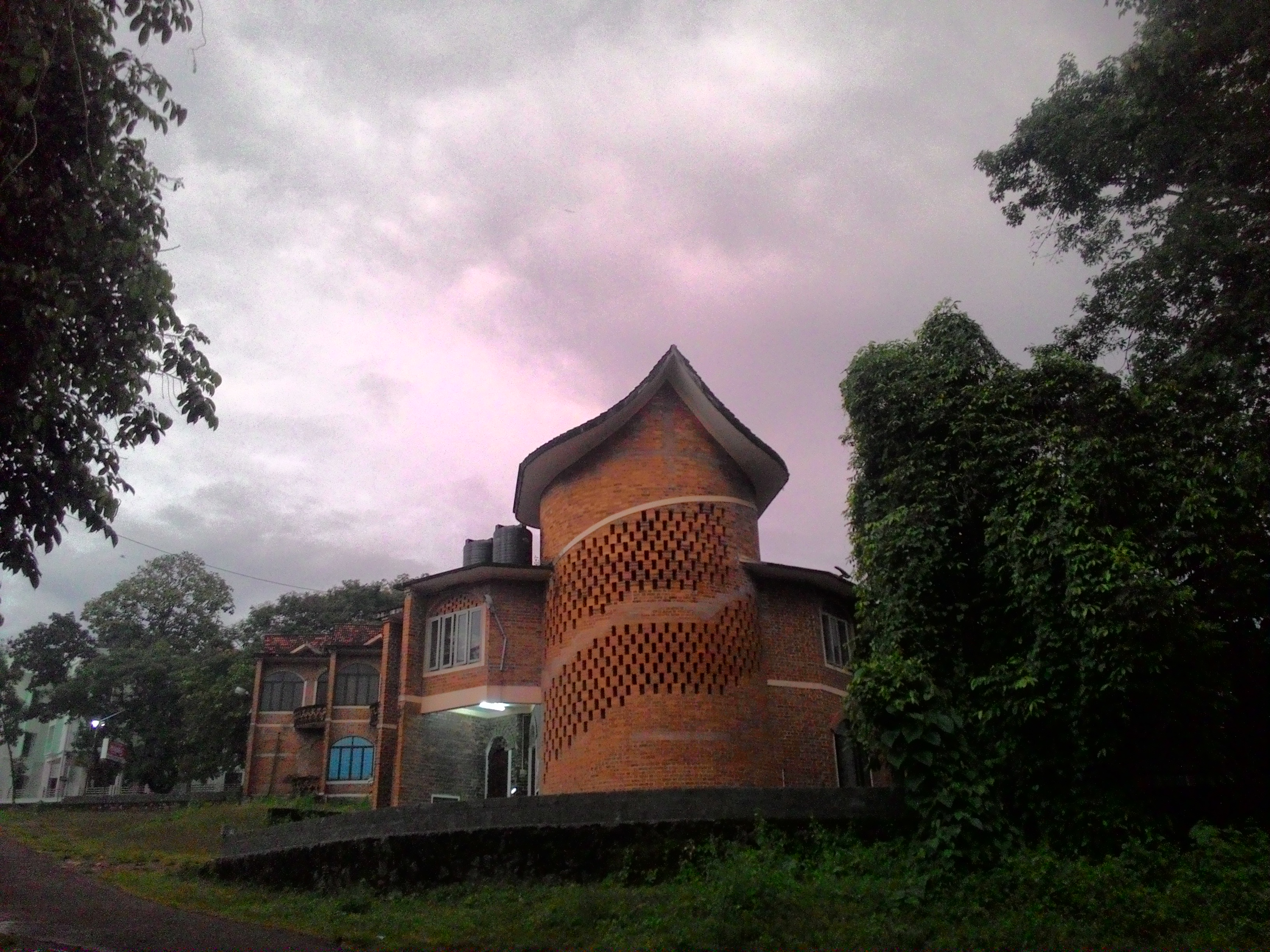
Guest House at Kalamassery

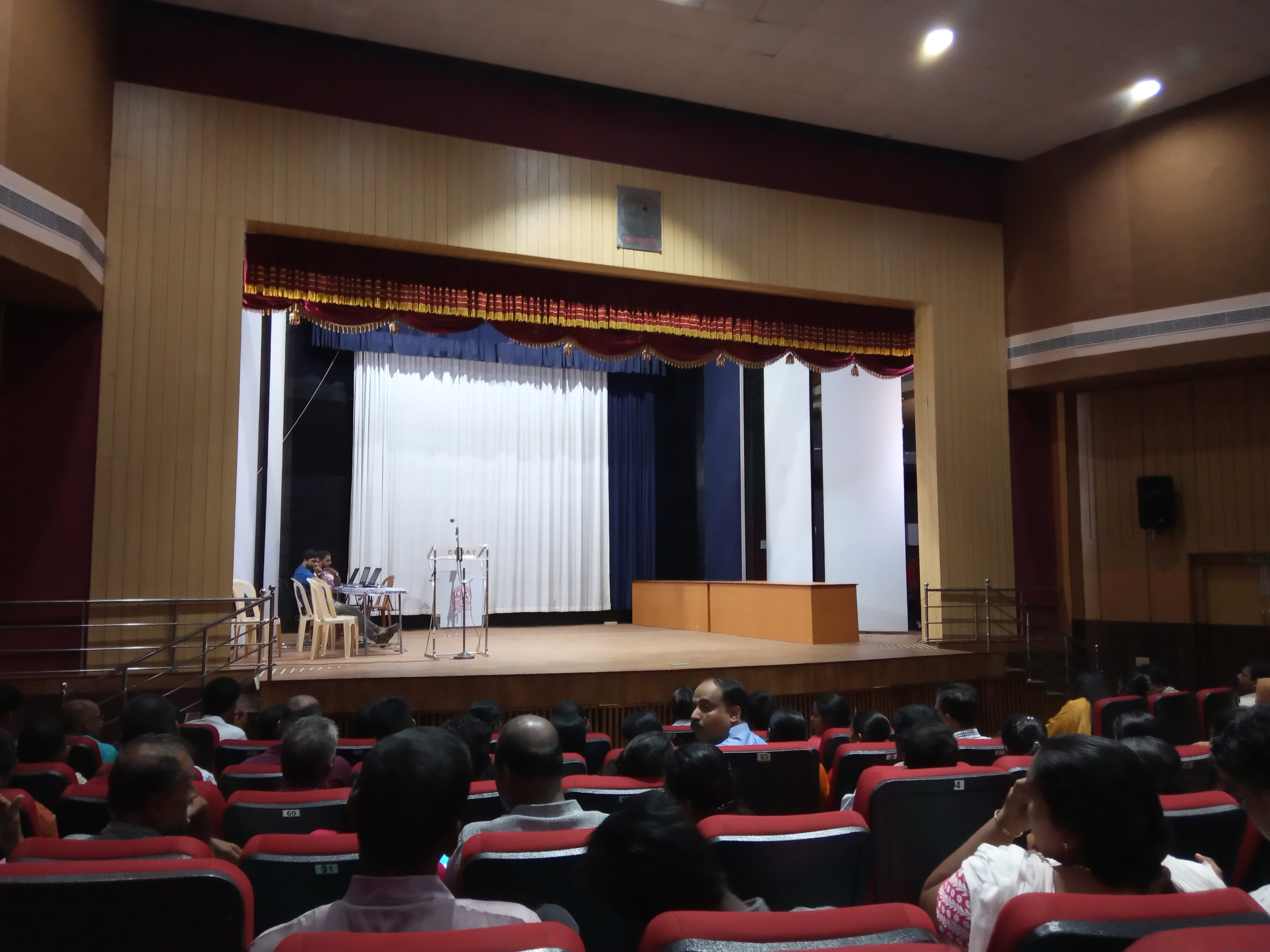
Seminar hall

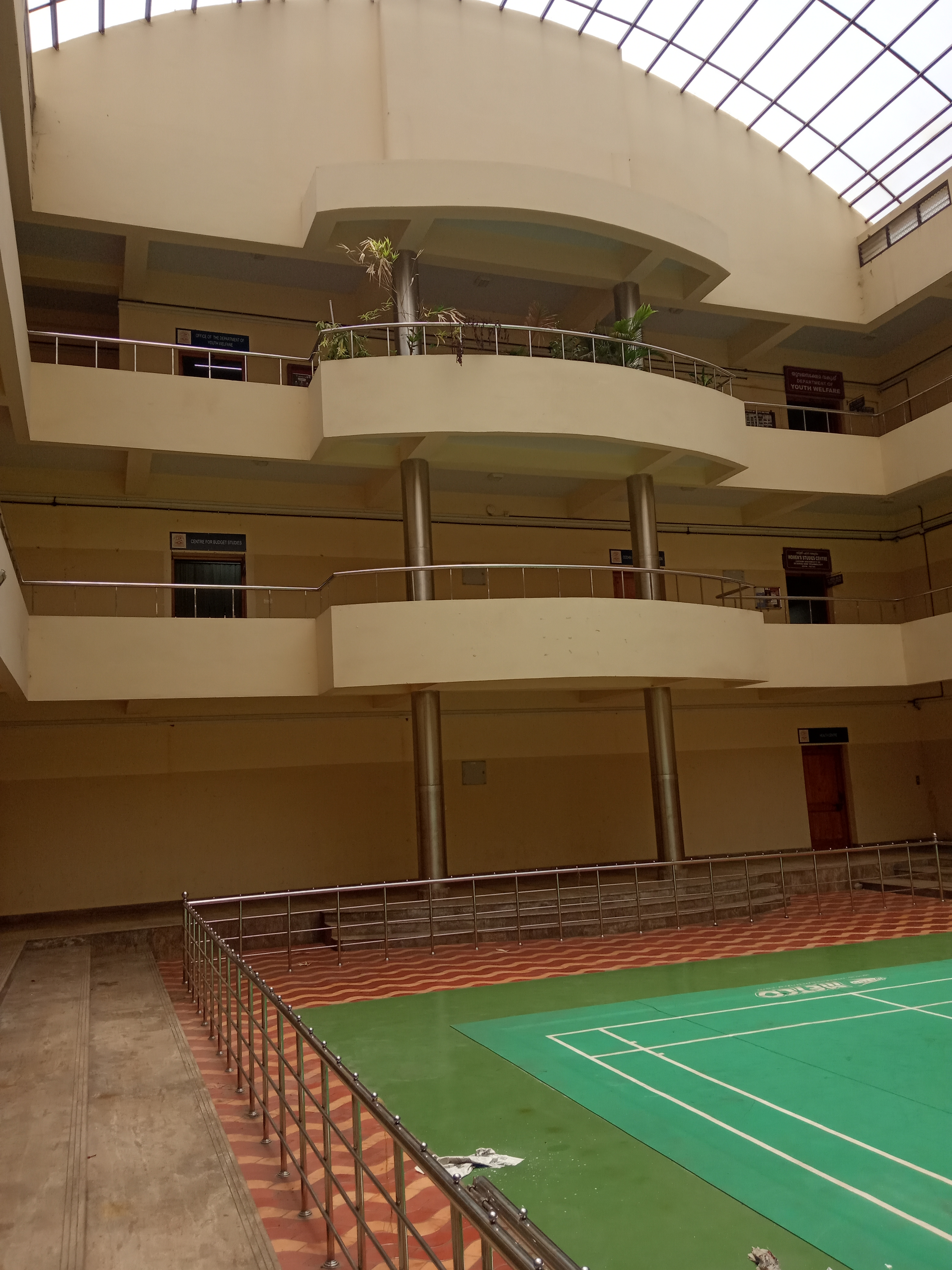
Students Amenities Centre Inside View.

The main campus is 1.5 km (0.93 mi) off the National Highway 47 in South Kalamassery. The 180-acre (0.73 km^{2}) campus includes the School of Engineering (SOE Campus), Kunjali Marakkar School of Marine Engineering, School of Management Studies, various Science departments, and the School of Legal Studies.

=== Lakeside Campus ===
The Lakeside campus, about 12 km (7.5 mi) from the main campus, is set on Fine Arts Avenue in Cochin city on the waterfront of the estuary. It includes the School of Marine Sciences, School of Industrial Fisheries, Department of Physical Oceanography, Department of Atmospheric Sciences, Department of Chemical Oceanography, Department of Marine Biology, Microbiology and Biochemistry, and the Department of Marine Geology and Geophysics. The School of Marine Sciences library is one of the largest marine science libraries in Asia. The school also has a research vessel for coastal water studies, and has academic interactions with other universities and research institutes within and outside India.

=== Pulincunnu Campus ===
The Pulincunnu campus in Kuttanad, Alappuzha District is 65 km from the Main campus. It is home to the Cochin University College of Engineering, Kuttanad (CUCEK).

== Faculties ==
CUSAT is structured into nine faculties:

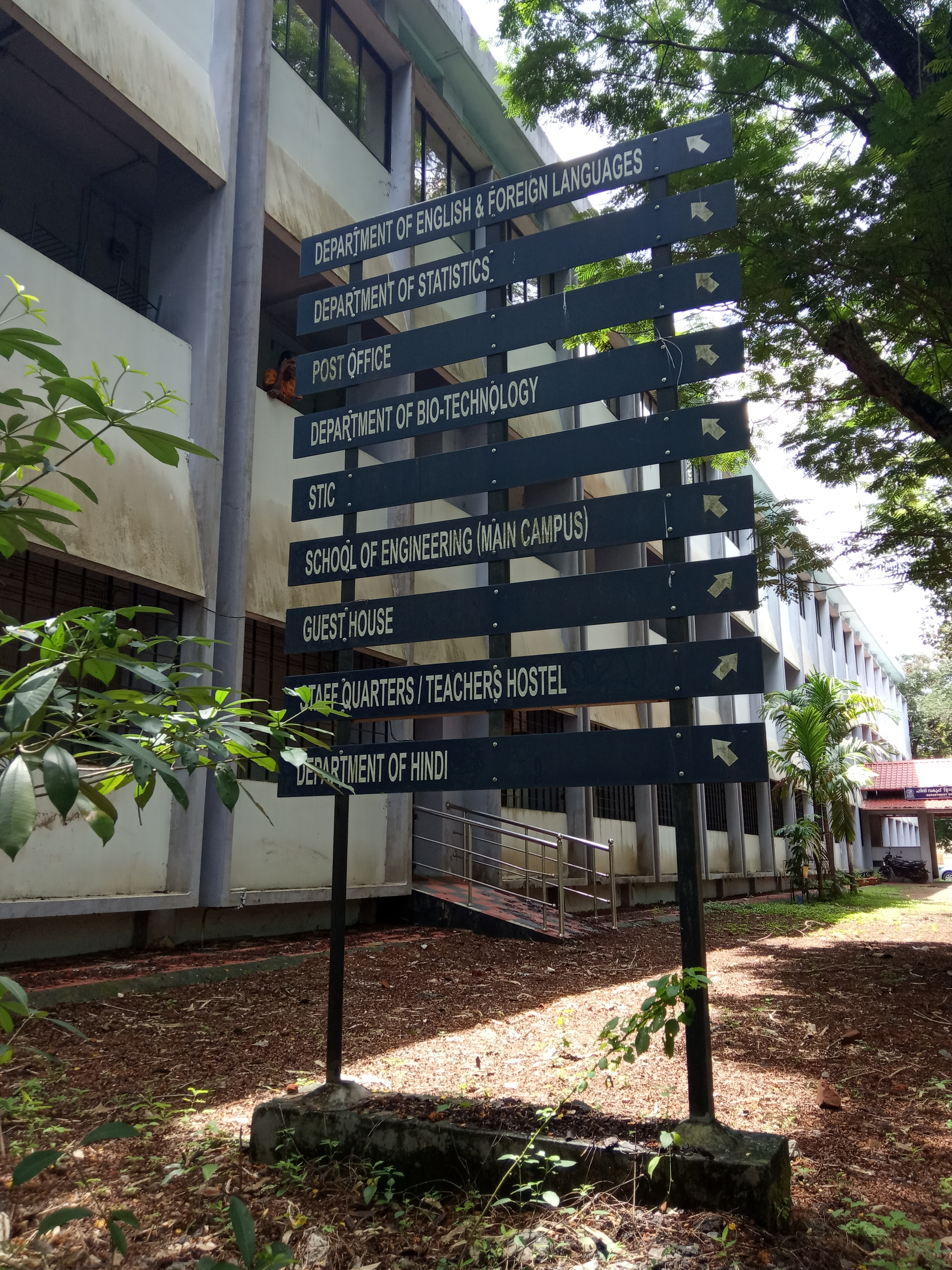
Signboard in the university showing different departments.

- Science
- Technology
- Engineering
- Environmental Studies
- Humanities
- Law
- Marine Sciences
- Medical Sciences and Technology
- Social Sciences

=== Faculty of Science ===
==== Department of Physics ====
The Department of Physics of the Cochin University of Science and Technology was founded as the Department of Physics of the Ernakulam Centre of the University of Kerala in 1963 by Prof. K. Venkateswarlu. It is now a centre of excellence, well known within India and abroad for its contributions to teaching and research in both experimental and theoretical physics. Areas of interest include nanoscience and technology, optoelectronic devices, quantum computing, semiconductor devices, solar cells, holographic materials, high density storage batteries, astrobiology and quantum optics. Research is sponsored by agencies including UGC, AICTE, IUCAA, DST, DRDO, CSIR, IUAC, DAE, and KSCSTE. The department has extensive instrumentation, which is made available to outside users at a nominal charge.

The department offers postgraduate programmes leading to the degrees of MSc (Physics), M.Phil. (Physics) and PhD.

The Department of Physics conducts a science awareness programme in physics and the National Space Olympiad in association with the IUCAA Resource Centre, CUSAT and Edumithra Intellectual Services.

=== Faculty of Technology ===
==== Department of Electronics ====
The Department of Electronics was established in 1975. Research areas include microwave electronics, microprocessors, underwater acoustics, ocean electronics, microwave propagation antennas, microwave image processing, pattern recognition, microprocessor applications in signal processing and display devices. Research is sponsored by external agencies including the DST, ISRO, AICTE, DOE, DRDO, MOD and the state government. The department has international collaborations with Delft University (Netherlands), PolarizOne Corporation (Malaysia), University of Kent (UK) and University of Surrey (UK).

The department offers postgraduate programmes leading to the degrees of MSc (Electronics) and MTech (Electronics) with specializations in Microwave & Radar Electronics and Digital Electronics, and PhD.

The department conducts two national symposia as biennial events: the National Symposium on Antennas & Propagation (APSYM), and the Symposium on Ocean Electronics (SYMPOL).

==== Department of Instrumentation ====
The Department of Instrumentation was established in the year 1995 as an outgrowth of the University Science Instrumentation Centre (USIC), which offers instrumentation services including design and fabrication, glass blowing, and carpentry to science and technology departments of the university and external organizations. As an academic department, it now has research programmes in the areas of Instrumentation and Applied Physics, sponsored by external funding agencies including DST, DAE, UGC, AICTE, KSCSTE and TWAS. It also offers consultancy for the design and fabrication of experimental systems for teaching, research, calibration and industrial applications. The department offers a four-year BTech (Bachelors) course in Instrumentation Technology, two-year MTech course in Instrumentation Technology and two-year MSc course in Instrumentation.

K N Madhusoodanan, professor of Department of Instrumentation was appointed vice-chancellor (VC) of CUSAT on 25 April 2019 by Governor P Sathasivam.

==== Department of Polymer Science and Rubber Technology ====
The Department of Polymer Science and Rubber Technology (P.S. & R.T.), established in 1971, is a pioneer in the areas of education and research in polymer science and engineering. Its BTech programme began in 1972, in collaboration with the Rubber Research Institute of India. It is funded by agencies including Nuffic (MHO, The Netherlands), Volkswagen Foundation (Germany), MHRD, AICTE, DRDO, DST, and UGC.

==== Department of Ship Technology ====
The Department of Ship Technology was founded in 1974 and is one of the pioneers in the field of Naval Architecture education in India. Its BTech programme in Naval Architecture and Ship Building began in 1975. The Naval Architecture programme is run in collaboration with the University of Rostock, Germany, and its graduates are in demand for positions in the shipbuilding industry, ship classification societies, R&D organisations, and the Indian Navy. The Ministry of Shipping (Government of India) approved the BTech course for the M.O.T. Certificate Examination, and the Indian Navy has recognised this department as a centre for the higher education of their officers.

The Society of Naval Architecture Students in the department publishes an annual Technical Magazine, SHIPSTECHNIC.

==== International School of Photonics ====
The International School of Photonics (ISP) was founded in 1995. Research activities include the design and fabrication of various laser systems and laser components, investigations of non-linear phenomena in different materials using photothermal, photoacoustic and related techniques, time- and space-resolved studies on laser-induced plasmas, design and characterization of fibre-optic sensors, fabrication and characterisation of polymer fibres, preparation and investigation of photonic materials and studies on photonics theory, sponsored by funding agencies including DST, AICTE and UGC. The University Grants Commission designated Cochin University of Science and Technology as a "University with Potential for Excellence in the Field of Lasers and Optoelectronics Sciences" in March 2002, and provided a grant of Rs. 5 crore that was used to establish a Centre of Excellence in Lasers and Optoelectronics Sciences (CELOS). The Centre later merged with the International School of Photonics.

The department offers postgraduate programmes leading to the degrees of MTech (Opto Electronics and Laser Technology) and PhD.

==== Department of Computer Applications ====
The Department of Computer Applications (DCA) was established in 1994. It offers a Masters in Computer Applications programme with the financial support of UGC and the Department of Electronics, Government of India. Research areas include information security, simulation and modelling, cryptography and coding theory, language computing, algorithms, pattern recognition, Web mining, applications of graph theory, image processing, data mining, networking and software engineering. The department also provide MSc Computer Science with Specialization in soft Computing from 2016. The aim is to prepare the students with both theoretical and practical foundation in soft computing. The curriculum includes exposure to the current technologies like Machine Learning, Natural Language Processing, AI, Big Data Analytics etc.

==== Department of Computer Science ====
The Department of Computer Science (DCS) focuses on academic programs in Information Systems, but also includes research on high-speed computing, human-computer interactions, information security, networked embedded systems, natural language processing, software engineering, and very-large-scale integration. It was instrumental in establishing the university computer centre and the CUSAT Intranet.

The department offers postgraduate programmes leading to the degrees of MTech (Computer & Information Science), MTech (Software Engineering) and MTech (Computer Science with Specialization in Data Science & Artificial Intelligence), MSc Computer Science (Artificial Intelligence & Data Science) and PhD (Computer Science / Computer Engineering or Information Science).

Research laboratories include:

1. Artificial Intelligence & Computer Vision Laboratory (AICV)

2. Bioinformatics Laboratory (BI)

3. Cyber Physical Systems Laboratory (CPS)

4. Natural Language Processing Laboratory (NLP)

5. Software Engineering Laboratory (SEL)

=== Faculty of Engineering ===
==== School of Engineering, Thrikkakara ====
The School of Engineering was established in 1979 to offer part-time MTech programmes in the major disciplines of engineering (Civil, Mechanical, Electrical and Chemical Engineering) for practising engineers in and around Cochin. In 1995 the School introduced BTech programmes in Civil engineering, Mechanical engineering, Electronics and Communication engineering, Computer Science & Engineering and Information technology. Safety and Fire Engineering was added in 1996 and Electrical & Electronics Engineering in 2003.

In 1981 the School added PhD programmes. As of 2019, the School had produced 53 PhDs and over 250 candidates were registered as research students. External funding for research activities is provided by agencies including DST, the Central Water Commission, ISRO, AICTE, Coir Board, and the Kerala State Coir Corporation.

The BTech programmes offered by the school are accredited by the National Board of Accreditation (NBA) under the Tier-I system. The National Board of Accreditation (NBA) is a permanent signatory to the Washington Accord that sets standards for engineering undergraduate degrees in a number of countries.

Undergraduate BTech courses (student intake in parentheses)

- Civil engineering (90)
- Computer Science and Engineering (143)
- Electrical and Electronics Engineering (60)
- Electronics and Communication engineering (90)
- Information technology (90)
- Mechanical engineering (90)
- Safety and Fire Engineering (60)

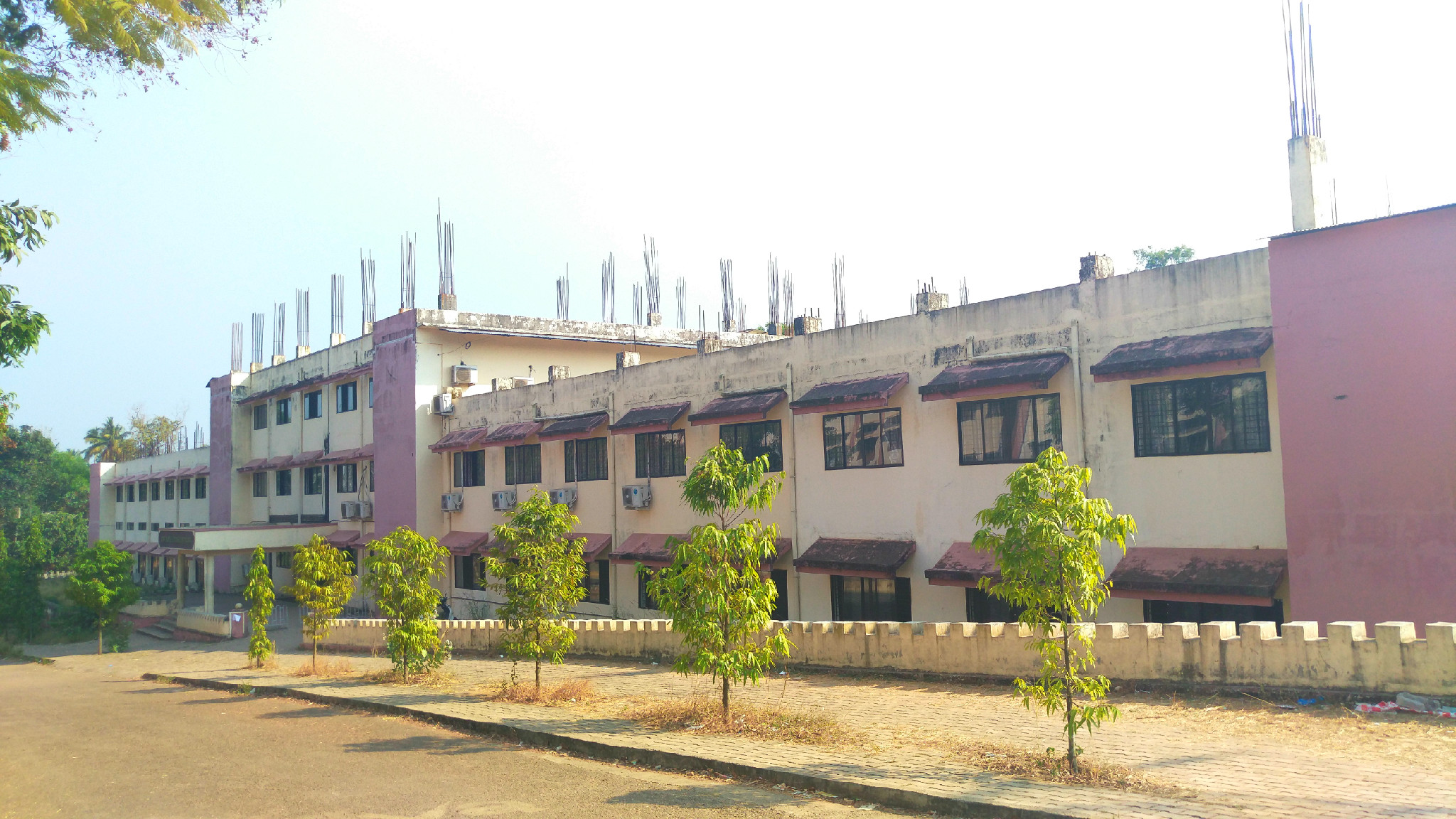
Software Engineering block

Postgraduate MTech courses

Full Time

- Information Technology (Software Systems) (18)
- Computer Science and Engineering (Networking Systems) (18)
- Civil Engineering (Geo-technical Engineering) (18)
- Mechanical Engineering (Thermal Engineering) (18)
- Electronics & Communications Engineering (Wireless Technology) (18)

Part Time

- Civil Engineering (18)
- Mechanical Engineering (18)
- Chemical Engineering (18)
- Electrical Engineering (18)

PhD programmes are available in all areas mentioned above.

==== Kunjali Marakkar School of Marine Engineering ====
The Kunjali Marakkar School of Marine Engineering offers a BTech programme in Marine Engineering. This is a full-time compulsory residential programme. Students wear Merchant navy Cadets' Uniform for classes. Physical training is compulsory for the cadets.

The intake for BTech Marine Engineering is 80 per year. In 2014, a full-time two-year MTech programme in Marine Engineering (80 students) was added. The School also provides short term courses in an Engine Room Simulator for students preparing for competitive examinations conducted by the Directorate General of Shipping.

==== Cochin University College of Engineering, Kuttanad ====
The Cochin University College of Engineering, Kuttanad was established in 1999 and is owned by the Cochin University of Science and Technology. It is situated in a 42-acre campus in Pulincunnoo, Kuttanad, about 75 km away from the main campus at Thrikkakara. It is the only campus of CUSAT that is outside the Ernakulam District. BTech programmes are offered in:

- Computer Science and Engineering
- Electrical and Electronics Engineering
- Electronics and Communication Engineering
- Information Technology
- Mechanical Engineering
- Civil Engineering
- Computer Applications

=== Faculty of Environmental Studies ===
==== School of Environmental Studies ====
The School of Environmental Studies, a Centre for higher learning dedicated to environmental protection and sustainable development, was established in 1983. The School is funded by grants from the Department of Science and Technology and the University Grants Commission.

The National Centre for Aquatic Animal Health (NCAAH), attached to the School of Environmental Studies conducts a two-year MTech programme sponsored by the Department of Biotechnology, Government of India under its network programme in human resource development in biotechnology.

The MSc in Environmental Technology is offered with specializations in two disciplines:

Stream I: Environmental engineering

Stream 2: Environmental biotechnology.

Doctoral programmes are offered in the areas of: environmental biology, environmental chemistry, environmental photocatalysis & sonophotocatalysis, environmental microbiology, Environmental Management, environmental toxicology, environmental biotechnology, environmental engineering and remote sensing.

The School conducts UGC sponsored refresher Courses for university and college teachers, and offers consultancy services in climate resilience, environmental surveys, pollution monitoring, water quality management, water treatment, disease diagnosis and management of aquaculture systems, and environmental impact assessment. The School participated in the environmental impact assessment for the Metro Rail Project of Kochi city.

=== Faculty of Humanities ===
==== Department of Hindi ====
The Department of Hindi, established in 1963, is one of the oldest departments of the university. It was originally part of Kerala University but moved to the University of Cochin in 1971. It is the only department in South India with Department Research Support (DRS) and Department Special Assistance (DSA) programmes in Hindi supported by UGC.

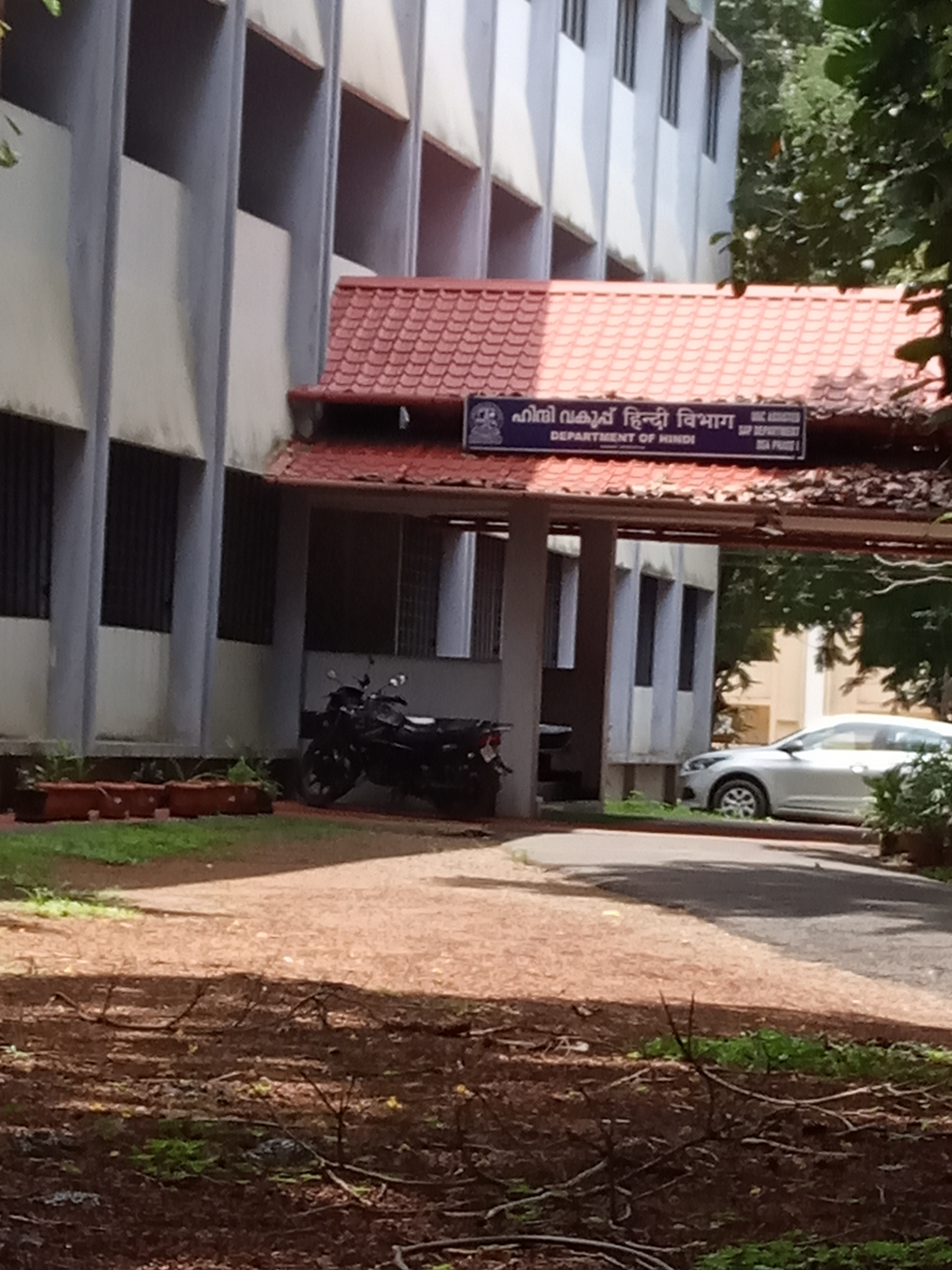
Hindi Department

The department's research includes areas such as ancient and modern poetry, fiction, drama and theatre studies, criticism, grammar, linguistics, comparative studies of languages and literature, folk literature, translation, and computer aided language teaching.

Programmes of study and research:

- M.A. Hindi Language and Literature
- M.Phil. P.G. Diploma in Translational and Functional Hindi
- PhD
- Short Term Course in Computer-based Training and Teaching in Hindi

==== Department of English and Foreign Languages ====
The Department of English and Foreign Languages was initially established as the Department of Foreign Languages in 1976. The department's main focus is the teaching of languages including English, French, German, Italian, Japanese and Russian. In 2012 the department was named the Department of English and Foreign Languages, to signal the special importance of English language teaching.

=== Faculty of Law ===
==== School of Legal Studies ====
The School of Legal Studies was initially established as the Postgraduate Department of Law of Kerala University in 1962. The first Chair of the department was the late Dr. A.T. Markose, an internationally reputed jurist who was the founding Director of the Indian Law Institute and Deputy Judge at the International Administrative Tribunal.

The school maintains an Intellectual Property Rights repository consisting of rare books and journals, with help from the Ministry of Human Resource Development (MHRD). The World Intellectual Property Organization (WIPO), a component agency of the United Nations, has donated its major publications to this repository. The MHRD has sanctioned a chair for Intellectual Property studies.

A Human Rights Chair in the name of late Justice V.R. Krishna Iyer has been established at the school to encourage interdisciplinary research into human rights.

The school offers a 3-year LL.B. programme, a 5-year B.B.A, LL.B. (Hons) programme, and a B.Com. LL.B (Hons.) programme.

=== Inter University Centre for Intellectual Property Rights Studies ===
The Centre for IPR Studies established in the School of Legal Studies of the Cochin University of Science & Technology in 2003 is converted into an Inter University Centre in 2009 to encourage multidisciplinary teaching and research in the area of intellectual property rights. This is an autonomous Centre at CUSAT established by the Government of Kerala envisaged to be a research hub and resource centre facilitating interaction between researchers from different universities in Kerala and outside. This is one of the Inter University Centers conceived and implemented by the Department of Education, Government of Kerala.

Centre for IPR Studies was originally established with Dr. K.N. Chandrasekharan Pillai, Dean, Faculty of Law as the Director and Dr. N.S. Gopalakrishnan as the Coordinator. The centre is also supported by the Ministry of Human Resources Development, Government of India, which has already established a Chair on Intellectual Property Rights in CUSAT in 2003.

The centre is offering multi-disciplinary PhD Programme with scholarships in IPR related areas to encourage researchers from different disciplines like law, economics, political science, history, science and technology etc. to undertake policy research. There are several research scholars working in different areas. The availability of primary research materials in the depository makes it possible for the researchers to bring out mimeographs on vital topics in the area of Intellectual Property Rights. The centre, in association with the School of Legal Studies, also offers courses on Intellectual Property Rights for the LL.M programme of the School.

The IUCIPRS is administered by a Governing Council with the Hon'ble Minister for Education and Culture, Government of Kerala as chairman. There is an executive committee with the Vice-Chancellor of CUSAT as chairman and a Faculty Committee to manage the administrative and academic activities of the centre. Dr. M. Bhasi is the Director of the centre.

=== Courses Offered ===
1. LLM (IPR) PhD Integrated (5 Year)

2. LLM (IP) PhD Integrated (5 Year)

3. LLM (IPR, 1 Year)

4. BBA LLB (5 Year) 5. B.Com LLB (5 year)

=== DDU KAUSHAL Kendra ===
UGC has introduced DDU KAUSHAL KENDRAS (DDUKK) for promoting vocational education in continuation to its initiatives for introducing community colleges and B.Voc Programmes realizing the importance and the necessity for developing skills among students, and creating work ready manpower on large scale.

DDUKK CUSAT aims at providing quality vocational education through DDUKK by combining class room centered formal education and training with experience sharing of Industry practitioners and internships in business houses. The focus is towards integrated knowledge acquisition and upgrading human skill towards creating a new league of employable youth. Teaching and training methodology of courses offered under DDUKK are designed accordingly.

DDUKK was originally established with Dr. Zakkariaya K.A (Professor, School of Management Studies, CUSAT) as the founder director in the year 2015.

Courses offered: 1. M.Voc in Technology and Management Consultancy 2. M.Voc in Mobile Phone Application Development 3. B.Voc in Business Process and Data Analytics

=== Faculty of Marine Sciences ===
==== School of Industrial Fisheries ====
The Department of Industrial Fisheries was established in 1976 and upgraded to a school in 1995 to recognize its academic and scientific achievements. It has five divisions:

- Aquaculture and Capture Fisheries
- Fishing Technology
- Fish Processing Technology
- Fisheries Economics
- Fisheries Management.

==== Department of Atmospheric Sciences ====
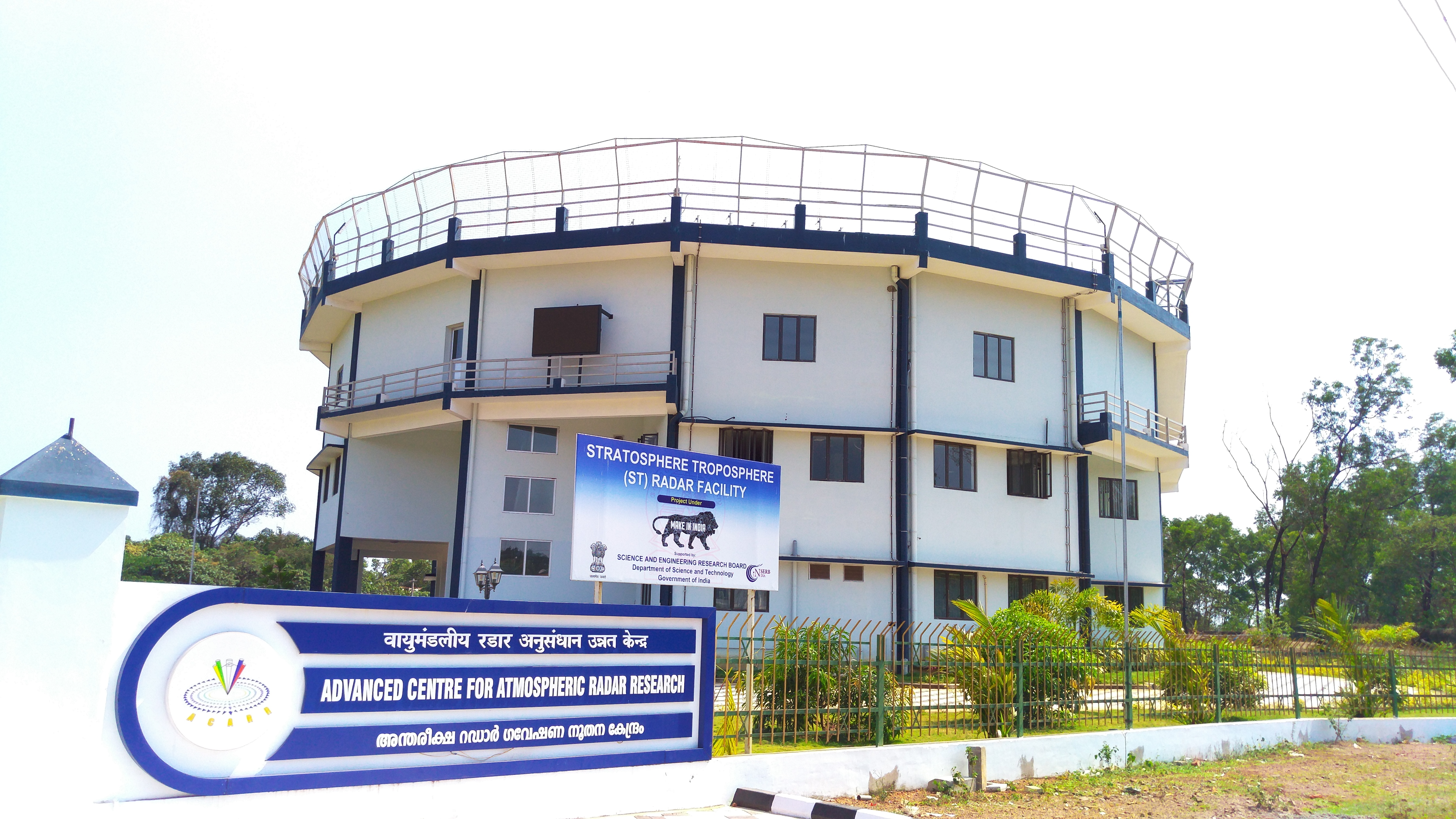
Advanced Center for Atmospheric Radar Research at CUSAT

The Department of Atmospheric Sciences is a centre of excellence in teaching and research in the field of Meteorology/Atmospheric Sciences. It is located in the Lakeside Campus of the Cochin University of Science and Technology.

The department was identified by the Council for Scientific and Industrial Research (CSIR) as one of the Centres of Excellence for the Government of India's New Millennium Indian Technology Leadership Initiative (NMITLI) on mesoscale modelling for monsoon-related predictions, along with other premier centres such as the Indian Institute of Technology, Delhi; the Indian Institute of Tropical Meteorology, Pune; the Indian Institute of Science, Bangalore; the Tata Institute of Fundamental Research, Mumbai; C- MMACS, Bangalore and the National Aerospace Laboratories, Bangalore.

The department offers post-graduate coursework leading to the degrees of MSc (Meteorology) and MTech (Atmospheric Science).

==== Department of Chemical Oceanography ====
The Department of Chemical Oceanography focuses on teaching and research on the chemistry of aquatic systems. This is a core discipline for research across the various disciplines of marine sciences.

==== Department of Marine Biology, Microbiology and Biochemistry ====
The Department of Marine Biology, Microbiology and Biochemistry is one of the foremost academic centres in marine biology in the country. It was founded in 1938 and immediately established a research programme. Over 100 PhD students have graduated from the department.

The department offers post-graduate coursework leading to the degrees of MSc (Marine Biology) and M. Phil.(Life Sciences).

Researchers from the department named a new species after the university, Victoriopisa cusatensis.

==== Department of Marine Geology and Geophysics ====
The Department of Marine Geology and Geophysics was one of the first departments in the country to recognize the importance of geology and geophysics in environmental and developmental issues. The postgraduate programme in Marine Geology began in 1976.

The department offers post-graduate coursework leading to the degree of MSc (Marine Geophysics).

==== Department of Physical Oceanography ====
The Department of Physical Oceanography was an outgrowth of the Department of Marine Biology and Oceanography of the University of Kerala. A postgraduate programme in Oceanography began in 1965, which later moved to the Physical Oceanography and Meteorology Division (POMD) of University of Cochin. In 1996, the Department of Physical oceanography was founded.

The department offers post-graduate coursework leading to the degrees of MSc (Oceanography) and MTech (Ocean Technology).

=== Faculty of Medical Sciences and Technology ===
==== Department of Biotechnology ====
The Department of Biotechnology, established in the year 1991, focuses on research in Microbiology, Virology, Microbial Ecology, Neurobiology, Cell and Molecular Biology, Medical Biochemistry, Genetic Engineering, Plant Biotechnology, Bio-electrochemical systems and Microbial Genetics.

The department offers post-graduate coursework leading to the degree of M.Sc. Microbiology (started in 2018), M.Sc. (Biotechnology), Integrated MSc in Biological Sciences (Started in 2021) and PhD in Biotechnology. Prof. (Dr.) Parvathi A. is currently serving as the Head of the Department.

=== Faculty of Social Sciences ===
==== Department of Applied Economics ====
The Department of Applied Economics focuses on the economics of technology, econometrics and operations research. The city of Kochi has an industrial belt and a coastal area that supports fishing. Industry and fishing have contributed considerably to environmental pollution in the area. Therefore, the department takes a particular interest in the technology problems of industry and the fisheries sector, and the economics of the environment.

The department offers postgraduate coursework leading to the degree of M.A. (Applied Economics) as well as M.Phil. and PhD programmes.

==== School of Management Studies ====
The School of Management Studies (SMS) is one of the oldest academic units of the university and was one of the first five management schools to be established in the country. It was founded in October 1964 as a part of Kerala University, under the leadership of Professor Emeritus M. V. Pylee and located in the premises of the Fertilizers and Chemicals Travancore Ltd. It became part of the University of Cochin in 1971, which later became Cochin University of Science and Technology. The school pursues four areas of academic activity: teaching, training, research, and consultancy.

SMS offers postgraduate coursework leading to the following degrees: MBA, M.Phil. (Commerce) and PhD

== Rankings ==
University rankings

General – international
- Times (World) (2024): 1201-1500
- Times (Asia) (2024): 301-350

General – India
- NIRF (Overall) (2024): 51
- NIRF (Universities) (2024): 34

CUSAT was ranked in the 1201-1500 band by the Times Higher Education World University Rankings in 2024 and in the 301-350 band in Asia. The NIRF ranked it 34th among universities and 51st overall in India in 2024.

== Centres ==
=== Centre for Science in Society ===
The Centre for Science in Society (C-SIS) was established in 1991 with partial financial assistance from Cochin Refineries Limited. The Centre aims to make science and technology more accessible to children. The government of Kerala has approved C-SIS as a training centre for high school science teachers under the "Sastraposini" Programme.

The Science and Technology Park of C-SIS includes a Space Pavilion donated by the Indian Space Research Organization (ISRO) that includes models of their space rockets and of the lunar probe Chandrayaan, and videos of rocket launches from Sriharikota. Students can see demonstrations of trajectory monitoring and error correction in the process of satellite launching. The park also includes an electronics exhibit from the U.S based (IEEE) Institute of Electrical and Electronics Engineers, 'E –Scientia'.

=== Sophisticated Test and Instrumentation Centre ===
The Sophisticated Test and Instrumentation Centre (STIC) is a joint venture of the Kerala State Council for Science, Technology and Environment (KSCSTE) and Cochin University of Science and Technology (CUSAT). Its goals are to provide advanced instrument facilities for analysis testing, measurement, and calibration to users from industries, academic institutions, and R&D establishments; develop novel instruments in areas relevant to industries in the State; and offer training in the operation of these instruments for industry and academic institutions.

=== National Centre for Aquatic Animal Health ===
The National Centre for Aquatic Animal Health (NCAAH) was formerly the Centre for Fish Disease Diagnosis and Management. It is situated in the Lakeside Campus of the university. The centre was established in 2000 to support aquatic farmers in protecting the health of growing stocks. It includes research laboratories in bacteriology, virology, animal tissue culture, immunology, genomics, proteomics, fermentation, and bioassays. The centre offers an MTech programme in Marine Biotechnology sponsored by the Department of Biotechnology of the Government of India.

=== Centre for the Study of Social Exclusion & Inclusive Policy ===
The Centre for the Study of Social Exclusion & Inclusive Policy (CSSEIP) was founded in 2009. It performs research into social exclusion, focusing on digital exclusion, housing and basic amenities exclusion, socio-cultural and structural determinants of exclusion, spatial exclusion, and demographic dimensions of exclusion.

=== Women's Studies Centre ===
The Women's Studies Centre (WSC) was started in 2010 with financial assistance from the University Grants Commission with a view to build up Women's capacity for empowerment. Since then the centre has been striving hard to achieve the goals. The centre has conducted numerous seminars and outreach programmes.

=== Inter University Centre for IPR Studies ===
Inter University Centre for IPR Studies (IUCIPRS) is an autonomous institution established by the Department of Higher Education of the Government of Kerala, within the Cochin University of Science and Technology. It was founded in 2003 to encourage multidisciplinary teaching and research in the area of intellectual property rights.

IUCIPRS's governing council consists of 12 members with the Minister for Education and Culture, Government of Kerala as chair and the Vice-Chancellor of CUSAT as vice-chair.

=== International Centre for Economic Policy and Analysis ===
The International Centre for Economic Policy and Analysis (ICEPA) emerged from international collaborations led by the Department of Applied Economics in the 1990s and 2000s. ICEPA was established in 2004 to focus on the analysis of economic issues and develop guidelines for policy decisions. The Centre collaborates with national and international NGO's as well as with industries and governments.

The centre has performed studies relating to the World Bank, the European Union, the Royal Netherlands Embassy, the Development Research Institute of The Netherlands, the Tilburg University, the Ministries of Agriculture and of Plantation (Government of India), and the Kerala Shipping and Inland Navigation Corporation Ltd.

== Tech Fest Incident in 2023 ==
The CUSAT stampede was a fatal incident that occurred on 25 November 2023, at the CUSAT in Kochi, Kerala. Four students died and 64 others were injured when a crowd of people tried to enter an open-air auditorium where a concert by singer Nikhita Gandhi was about to begin, as part of the university's annual tech festival 'Dhishna'. The concert was organized in collaboration with Realme, a smartphone brand. The stampede was triggered by a sudden rain and a lack of proper crowd management, as only those with passes and 'Dhishna' T-shirts were allowed inside the auditorium, which had a single entrance/exit gate.

== See also ==
- List of colleges affiliated with Cochin University of Science and Technology

== Notable alumni ==
- Ameer Shahul, Author and environmentalist
- Sunil Thomas, Honorable Judge, High court of Kerala
- Mary Joseph, Honorable Judge, High court of Kerala
- Tom Jose, Chief Secretary, Government of Kerala
- Appu Krishnan, musician
- Roshan Mathew, actor
- B. Ravi Pillai, industrialist, business tycoon
- Shanker Ramakrishnan, director
- Roopesh, Maoist Leader
- Sabu Thomas, Vice chancellor, MG University, Kottayam
- Roxy Mathew Koll, Climate Scientist
- Madhu Vasudevan, professor, lyricist
- Binoy Viswam, Politician, ex-member of Parliament, Former Forest & Wildlife Minister.
- Sebastian Paul, Politician
- Ashiq Usman, film producer, actor
